= Robert Brewster (Roundhead) =

English landowner of Parliamentarian sympathies

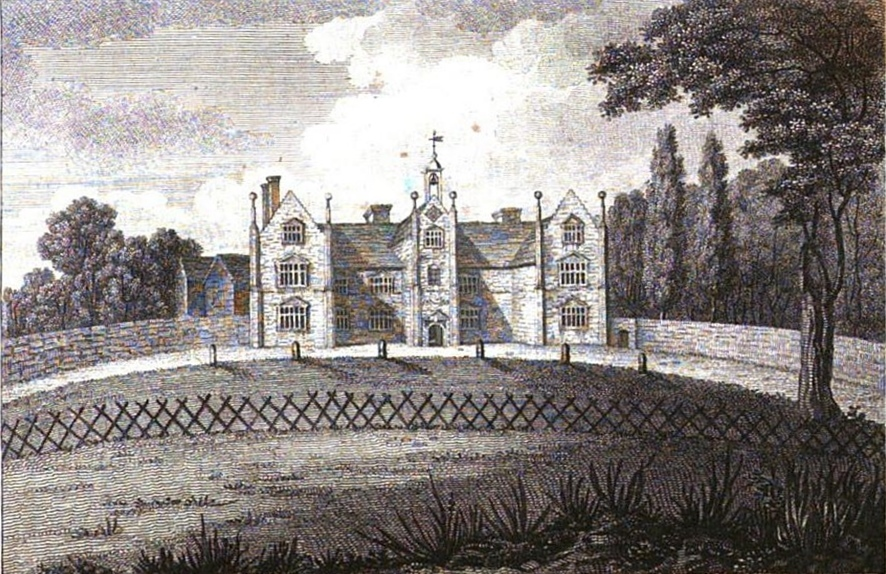
The Brewster residence at Wrentham Hall, built c. 1550, torn down in 1810

Robert Brewster (1599–1663) was an English landowner of Parliamentarian sympathies who sat in the House of Commons at various times between 1645 and 1659.

== The Brewsters at Wrentham ==
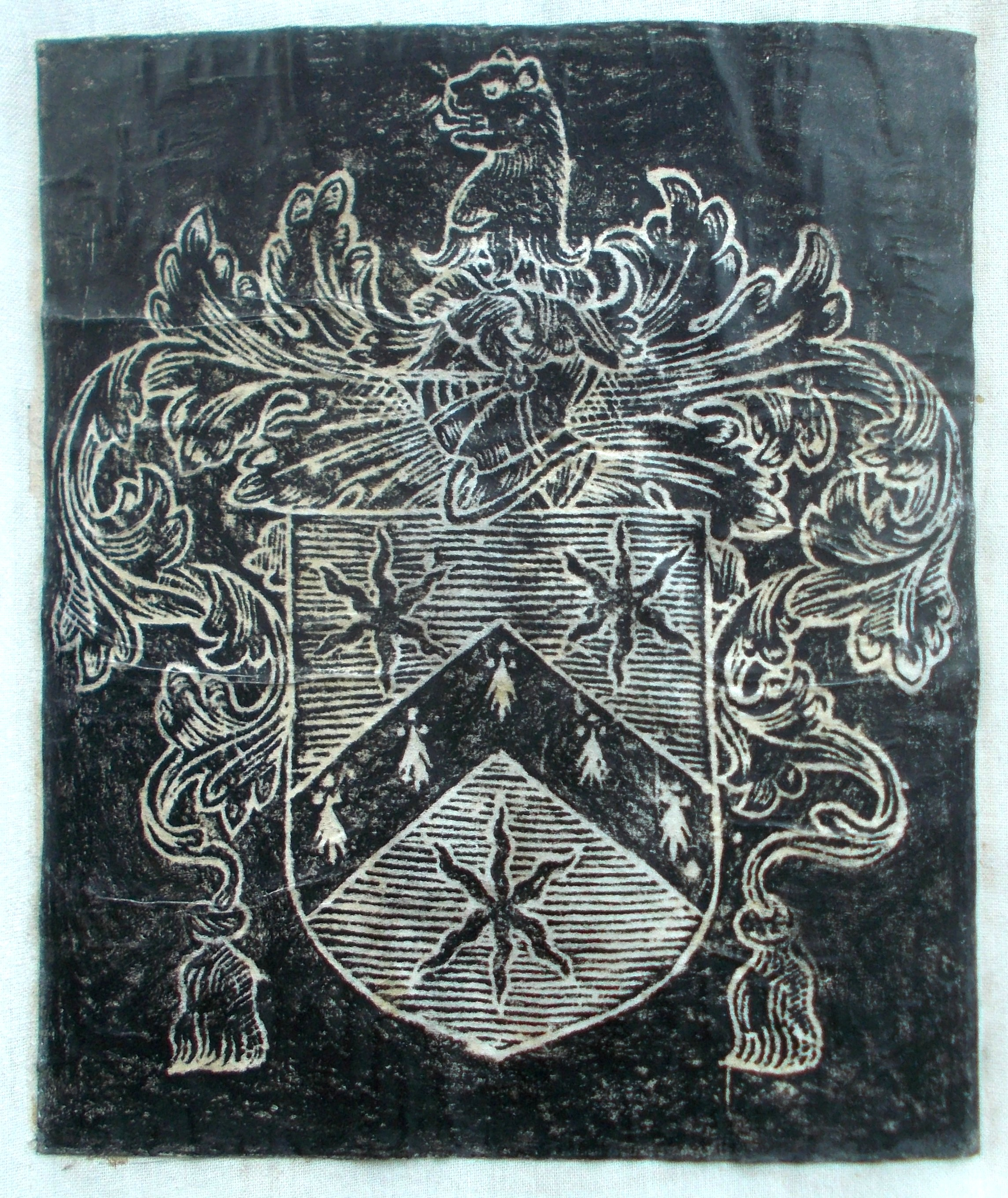
The Brewster arms on the monument of Humphrey Brewster (1593), Wrentham.

The Tudor brick mansion of Wrentham Hall (now lost) is said to have been built around 1550 by Humphrey Brewster, Esq. (c. 1527–1593), the elder son of Robert Brewster and his wife, daughter of Sir Christopher Edmonds of Cressing Temple, Essex. If so, he did not then hold the manor in chief. The lordship of Wrentham Southall, or Perpounds, belonged to Thomas Fiennes, 9th Baron Dacre (executed in 1541) and passed from his widow Lady Mary (Neville) to her son Gregory Fiennes, 10th Baron Dacre, who had licence to alienate the manor to trustees in 1571. So it became vested in his cousin Henry Norris, 1st Baron Norreys, who in 1576 had licence to alienate it to Humphrey Brewster.

Humphrey Brewster appears as lord of the manor of Wrentham Southall in a Chancery action brought by Thomas Butts in the time of Queen Elizabeth. The lordship of Wrentham Northall, or Poinings, belonged to Sir Thomas Radcliffe, 3rd Earl of Sussex, until 1567, when he sold it to Arthur Choute, who sold it to Humphrey Brewster in 1577. Humphrey was granted arms Sable a chevron (ermine) between three estoiles argent with crest A beaver's head erased sable by Harvey, Clarencieux in 1561. He married Alice, daughter of William Forster of Copdock (near Ipswich), and died in 1593, as shown by his brass memorial in Wrentham church. They had two sons, of whom the elder, Francis (1566-1644), succeeded to Wrentham Hall.

Francis Brewster married Elizabeth, daughter of Robert Snelling, Esq., of Ipswich; he was a magistrate, and became Deputy Lieutenant for the county. Robert Brewster, their son, matriculated from Pembroke College, Cambridge at Easter, 1617. He married Amy (daughter of Sir Thomas Corbet of Sprowston Hall, Norfolk), with whom he had 2 sons, Francis (died 1671) and Robert (died 1681). Amy Corbet was one of the sisters of Sir John Corbet, 1st Bart. and of the regicide Miles Corbet.

== Church, Parliament and Commonwealth ==
In March 1643 Robert Brewster was at once appointed to the Suffolk Committee for the enforcement of the Ordinance for sequestration of the estates of notorious delinquents, and in June Robert and Francis Brewster were named to an additional Suffolk committee for the raising of money to support the Parliamentary army. In August Robert was appointed one of the representatives for Suffolk to the committee (called "Deputy Lieutenants") for the Associated Counties (Norfolk, Suffolk, Essex, Hertford, Huntingdon and Cambridge, and the City of Norwich) for the arrangement of their defence against rebellious or papistical armies, including that of the Earl of Newcastle. He was thereafter concerned with the raising of levies to support the Parliamentary forces, and in June 1646 was named as a deputy to adjudge scandalous offences deserving exclusion from the Sacrament by the Elderships of congregations.

In 1645 Robert Brewster was elected Member of Parliament for Dunwich as a recruiter to the Long Parliament. Dunwich customarily had two Members, and at first he sat with Anthony Bedingfield. In 1644, pursuant to the Act for the appointment of local committees to investigate scandalous ministers, a Suffolk committee consisting of Alexander Bence, Squire Bence, William Blois, Francis Brewster, Robert Brewster, Sir Edward Duke, William Heveningham, Sir William Playters, Edward Read, William Rivet and Sir John Rous (1586-1662) had been appointed. As a result, William Fenn, parson of Theberton, was summoned to appear at the King's Head in Beccles to be inquired into: Sir Robert Brooke (of Cockfield Hall), Robert Brewster Esquire and Francis Brewster, gent., were among the signatories to the warrant, styling themselves "Deputy Lieutenants" and "Committee of Parliament". Numerous charges, mostly of a political nature, were brought against Fenn who was accordingly ejected, and died in 1651.

Following the August 1648 ordinance for congregational organization of parochial worship, Robert's brother Francis Brewster (1600-1657), of Pyes Hall, Wrentham, was one of the twelve who joined in the formation of a Congregational church fellowship at Wrentham in February 1649. He, presumably, was the Francis Brewster recommended to the Lord Protector on 29 May 1653 by the Churches of Suffolk to be advanced to places of public trust for management of the affairs of the Commonwealth. In 1653 Robert Brewster (as magistrate) certified the swearing-in of Parish Registrars for Frostenden and Theberton. Both Robert and Francis were appointed to the Suffolk committee of August 1654 for the ejection of scandalous ministers. In 1654, arising from their petition, Robert and Francis certified, in returns to the Lord Protector, details of the Ministers and the communities supporting them at Walberswick and Dunwich, and at Cookley and Walpole, Sibton, Beccles and Sancroft.

Having survived Pride's Purge, Robert sat alone for Dunwich in the Rump Parliament until 1653. Dunwich was not represented at all in the Barebones Parliament of 1653, but Robert's son Francis Brewster sat for the County in that assembly. In 1654 Robert was elected as sole representative for Dunwich in the First Protectorate Parliament, but in 1656 the seat was occupied by Francis, while Robert himself sat for Suffolk: he supported the move to offer the Crown to Oliver Cromwell. In the Third Protectorate Parliament of 1659 he sat for Dunwich again, with the second seat restored and occupied by John Barrington. Robert's brother Humphrey Brewster (1602-1669), of Hedenham, Norfolk, and later of Beccles, became Lieutenant-Colonel in the Parliamentary Army, raised and commanded a troop of horse, and was Governor of Landguard Fort in 1659–1660.

== Hindolveston ==
Robert Brewster acquired the manor of Hindolveston in Norfolk, which had belonged to the Dean and Chapter of the Cathedral Church of Norwich. Since the time of Henry VIII, under a long lease, the stewards had permitted the usual manorial fines to be levied at the fixed rate of sixpence per acre. Brewster began to levy fines at arbitrary rates, which the copyholders refused to pay. In 1650-1653 (represented by Mr Bedingfield) he brought Chancery litigation against them under their champion Sir Edward Astley (died 1653) of Hindolveston (represented by Mr Calthorpe): his claim was dismissed. He resumed this against the copyholders in 1655–1658, naming them all in his suit, and accusing them of forming a confederacy to detain the old manorial court rolls, and of having altered the landscape by ploughing to such an extent that the enclosures could not be assessed properly. For their part the copyholders asked the court to uphold the customary usage as of common law, which in November 1658 it did, throwing Brewster's case out of court entirely.

== Death and succession ==
At his death in 1663, Robert Brewster was buried in St Nicholas' Church, Wrentham, where he has a memorial. He was succeeded by his son Francis Brewster (MP), who died in 1671, and was himself succeeded as master of Wrentham Hall by his brother Robert (died 1681).

The Brewster arms are blazoned as sable a chevron ermine between three estoiles argent, and are quartered with Edwards: the crest, a leopard's head erased, azure (elsewhere, a beaver's, or a bear's head), and motto: Verité soyet ma Garde.

Parliament of England
Preceded by Henry Coke; Anthony Bedingfield	Member of Parliament for Dunwich; 1645–1653; With: Anthony Bedingfield 1645–1648	Succeeded by Not represented in Barebones Parliament
Preceded by Not represented in Barebones Parliament	Member of Parliament for Dunwich; 1654	Succeeded by Francis Brewster
Preceded by Sir William Spring; Sir Thomas Barnardiston; Sir Thomas Bedingfield; William Bloys; John Gurdon; William Gibbes; John Brandling; Alexander Bence; John Sicklemore; Thomas Bacon	Member of Parliament for Suffolk; 1656; With: Sir Thomas Barnardiston; Henry Felton; Henry North; Edmund Harvey; Edward Le Neve; John Sicklemore; William Blois; William Gibbes; Daniel Wall	Succeeded by Henry Felton; Sir Thomas Barnardiston
Preceded by Francis Brewster	Member of Parliament for Dunwich; 1659–1660; With: John Barrington 1659	Succeeded by Sir John Rous; Henry Bedingfield
