= Bury Conference (1645) =

The Bury Conference was held on 30 January, 1645 in Bury St Edmunds, Suffolk by committeemen of the Eastern Association to discuss their concerns about the proposed New Model Army. The Eastern Association had provided a major portion of the Parliamentarian Army which had proved victorious at the Battle of Marston Moor in July 1644. However the new proposals for a professional national standing army distinct from the functions of civilian administration was at odds with use of trained bands with which the Eastern Association had played such a major role in meeting the military challenges of the Royalist Army.

== Participants ==
The conference was a meeting of 35 Deputy Lieutenants and Committeemen from the Associated Counties of Norffolk, Suffolk, Essex, Hartford, Cambridge, Huntington, and Lincolnshire.

=== Norfolk ===
Seven were from Norfolk:

- Sir John Palgrave, 1st Baronet
- Edward Ashby
- Thomas Sotherton
- Robert Jermy
- John Spelman
- Tobias Frere
- John Greenwood of Norwich

=== Suffolk ===
Twelve were from Suffolk:

- Maurice Barrow, High Sheriff
- Sir William Spring
- Sir John Wentworth
- Henry North the elder
- Francis Bacon
- Thomas Tirrell
- Thomas Bacon
- Gibson Lucas
- Thomas Chaplin
- Thomas Gipps
- Brampton Gurdon Junior
- Nathaniel Bacon

=== Essex ===
Four were from Essex:

- Henry Mildmay
- Raymond
- Eldred
- Sorrell

=== Hertfordshire ===
Two were from Hertfordshire

- Alban Coxe
- Daughs

=== Cambridgeshire ===
Three were from Cambridgeshire

- Edward Clench
- Thomson
- Parker

=== Huntingdonshire ===
One was from Huntingdonshire

- William Drewry

=== Lincolnshire ===
Three were from Lincolnshire

- Sir William Brownlow
- Sir Thomas Trollop
- Montagu Cholmeley
