= John Gurdon (died 1679) =

English politician (1595–1679)

John Gurdon (3 July 1595 – 9 September 1679) was an English politician who sat in the House of Commons variously between 1640 and 1660. He supported the parliamentary cause in the English Civil War and was not returned to Parliament after the English Restoration.

== Political life ==
Gurdon was the son of a country gentleman, Brampton Gurdon, with estates at Letton, Norfolk, and Assington, Suffolk. He was elected to the Short Parliament and then the Long Parliament in 1640 for Ipswich.

During the Civil War, he supported the Parliamentarians. Later, when internal dissension broke out among them, he supported the Army party. He remained in the House of Commons after Pride's Purge, but when named one of the Commissioners for the trial of Charles I of England, he refused to attend. Even so, he was chosen as a member of the council of State in 1650, 1651 and 1652.

After the expulsion of the Long Parliament, Gurdon sat for Suffolk in the First Protectorate Parliament (1654) and for Sudbury in the Convention Parliament of 1660. He was not re-elected after the Restoration.

== Private life ==
Gurdon married Anne Parker, daughter of Sir Calthorpe Parker of Erwarton. His children included Philip Gurdon (c. 1630–1690), who was also an MP for Sudbury, and the Reverend Nathaniel Gurdon D. D. (died 1696), Rector of Chelmsford, who survived his brother to inherit Assington on his death.

There is a memorial to John Gurdon in the parish church of Assington, St Edmund's.

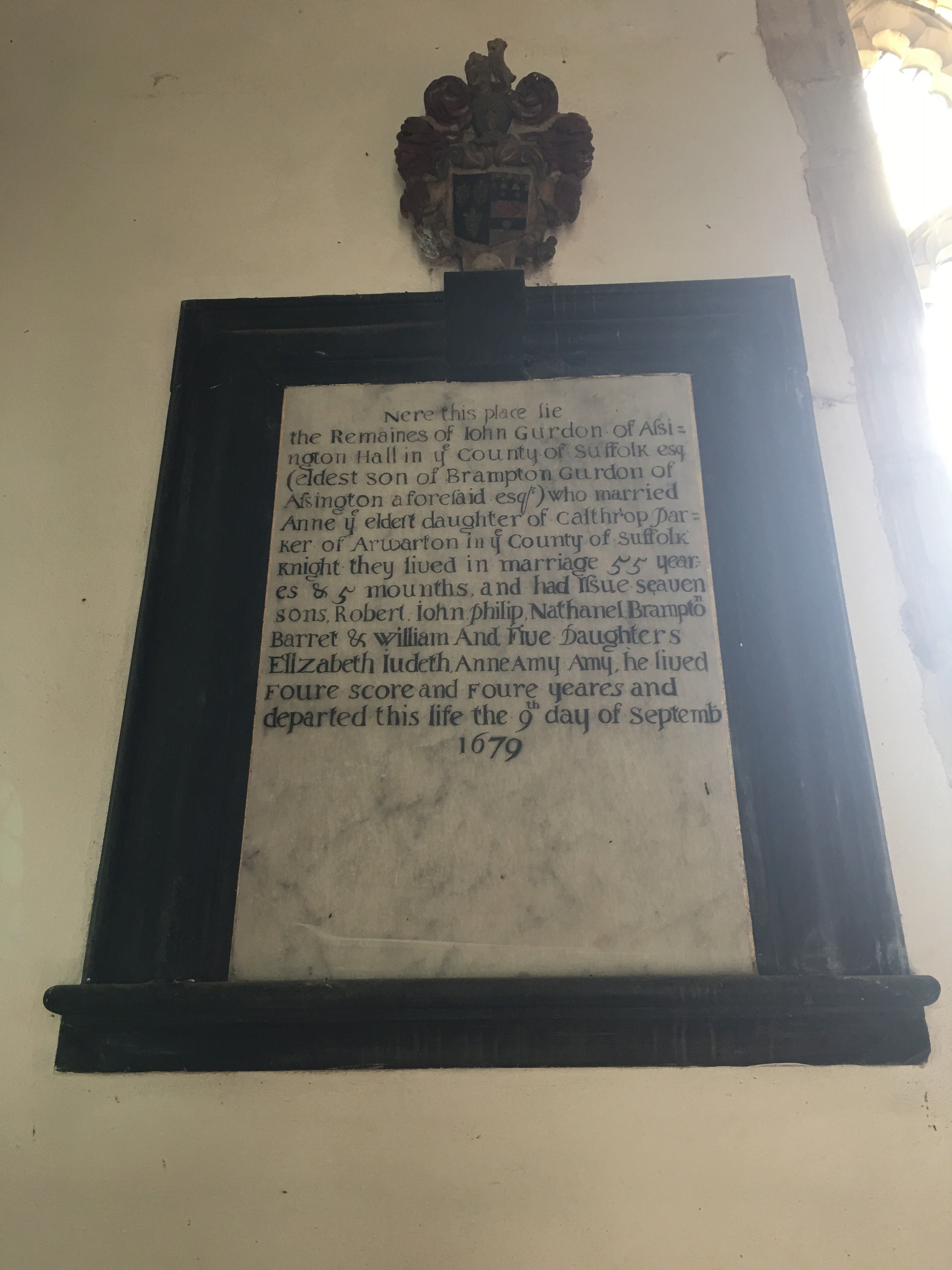
Memorial to John Gurdon in the church of St Edmund in Assington, Suffolk

Parliament of England
Vacant Parliament suspended since 1629	Member of Parliament for Ipswich; 1640–1653; With: William Cage 1640–1645; Francis Bacon 1645–1653	Not represented in Barebones Parliament
Preceded by Jacob Caley; Francis Brewster; Robert Dunken; John Clark; Edward Plumstead	Member of Parliament for Suffolk; 1654; With: Sir William Spring; Sir Thomas Barnardiston; Sir Thomas Bedingfield; William Blois; William Gibbes; John Brandling; Alexander Bence; John Sicklemore; Thomas Bacon	Succeeded by Sir William Spring; Sir Thomas Barnardiston; Sir Henry Felton; Henry North; Edmund Harvey; Edward Le Neve; John Sicklemore; William Bloys; William Gibbes; Robert Brewster; Daniel Wall
Vacant Not represented in restored Rump	Member of Parliament for Sudbury; 1660; With: Joseph Brand	Succeeded by Thomas Waldegrave; Isaac Appleton
