= John Clarke (Roundhead) =

English politician

John Clarke (fl. 1648 – November 1681), also known as John Clark, John Clerk, and John Clerke, was an English politician and Justice of the Peace who sat in the House of Commons from 1653 through 1660, and was a colonel in the Parliamentary army between 1651 and 1659.

== Biography ==
=== Family ===
Clarke was from Kensington, the son of John Clarke of Bocking, Essex. Clarke married Margaret Bourne of Bury St Edmunds, Suffolk, and had a son Samuel who was created baronet in 1698, and a daughter.

=== Local career ===
Clarke was an alderman of Bury St Edmunds by 1648 and remained until 1662.
In 1648 he was collector of assessments and commissioner for militia for Suffolk.
He was commissioner for assessment for Bury St Edmunds from 1648 to 1652 and for Suffolk from 1649 to 1652.
He was a Justice of the Peace for Suffolk from 1650 to March 1660 and was a commissioner of the High Court of Justice in 1650.
He was commissioner for scandalous ministers for Bury St Edmunds in 1654.
From 1655 to 1656 he was commissioner for security.
He was commissioner for assessment for Suffolk and Bury St Edmunds in 1657.
In 1659, he was commissioner for militia for Suffolk.
He was commissioner for assessment for Suffolk in January 1660 and commissioner for militia for Bury St Edmunds in March 1660.
He was High Sheriff of Suffolk from 1670 to 1671.

=== Parliamentary career ===
In 1653, Clarke was nominated as Member of Parliament for Suffolk in the Barebones Parliament.
In 1653 he was nominated as one of the representatives for Ireland in the Barebones Parliament.
He was elected MP for Bury St Edmunds for the First Protectorate Parliament in 1654.
In August 1654, he was returned to the First Protectorate Parliament as one of the two members for the three Irish counties of Donegal, Londonderry, and Tyrone and sat till January 1655. He was at that time Governor of Derry.
In 1656 he was re-elected MP for Bury St Edmunds in the Second Protectorate Parliament.
In 1656 he was elected MP for Pembrokeshire and Cardiganshire in the Second Protectorate Parliament, and chose to sit for Cardiganshire until 10 December 1657.
He was summoned to Cromwell's Other House (i.e. upper house), but did not take his seat.
In 1659, he was elected MP for Bury St Edmunds in the Third Protectorate Parliament.
In 1659, he was elected MP for Melcombe Regis and for Dartmouth in a double return and chose to sit for Melcombe Regis until April 1659.
In April 1660 he was re-elected MP for Bury St Edmunds for the Convention Parliament when he was involved in a double return. He was allowed to take his seat and then unseated.

In 1647, Clarke took up the accusation against the Eleven Members of the Peace Party in Parliament.
He was sent as Lieutenant Colonel Clerke with Admiral Blake to reduce the Scilly Isles in May 1651.
He was on the Fleet Committee in December 1653 and became a Commissioner for Irish affairs in January 1654. In February 1654, he was a Commissioner of the Admiralty and was appointed a commissioner for the army on 24 June 1654.
After the death of Oliver Cromwell he signed the order for proclaiming Richard Cromwell Protector and was on the Committee of Safety in 1659.

=== Abasement ===
Clarke was granted a Foot regiment on 16 June 1659 by the Committee of Safety, but was cashiered with Lambert and the other generals by the Council of State. He was mentioned as appointed to the command of Dunkirk in August 1659, but did not go there. He was ordered by the Council of State to depart from London on 13 January 1660, and ordered on 2 February 1660 "not to stay in town".

Clarke was a prisoner in the Gatehouse on 17 December 1660, when he petitioned the King for his release, stating that he "was imprisoned on suspicion of treason, of which he knew nothing, nor had he in the least misdemeaned himself."

=== Death ===
Clarke died in November 1681 and was buried in St Mary's churchyard, Bury St Edmunds.

== Notes ==
Parliament of England
Preceded by Not represented in Rump Parliament	Member of Parliament for Suffolk; 1653; With: Jacob Caley; Francis Brewster; Robert Dunkon; Edward Plumstead	Succeeded by Sir William Spring; Sir Thomas Barnardiston; Sir Thomas Bedingfield; William Bloys; John Gurdon; William Gibbes; John Brandling; Alexander Bence; John Sicklemore; Thomas Bacon
Preceded by Not represented in Barebones Parliament	Member of Parliament for Bury St Edmunds; 1654–1659; With: Samuel Moody 1654–1659; Thomas Chaplin 1659	Succeeded by Sir Thomas Barnardiston
