= William Gibbes (MP for Suffolk) =

English merchant and politician

William Gibbes (died May 1689) was an English merchant and politician who sat in the House of Commons between 1654 and 1656.

Gibbes was a London merchant and a member of the Worshipful Company of Goldsmiths. He was elected alderman of the City of London for Farringdon Without ward on 26 August 1642. He was Prime Warden of the Goldsmiths Company from 1643 to 1644 and Sheriff of London from 1644 to 1655.

In 1654, Gibbes was elected member of parliament for Suffolk in the Short Parliament. He was re-elected MP for Suffolk in 1656.

Gibbes lived at Stoke-by-Nayland. In 1677 he was High Sheriff of Suffolk.

Parliament of England
Preceded by Jacob Caley; Francis Brewster; Robert Dunken; John Clark; Edward Plumstead	Member of Parliament for Suffolk; 1654–1656; With: Sir Thomas Barnardiston 1654–1656; John Sicklemore 1654–1656; William Blois 1654–1656; Sir William Spring 1654; Sir Thomas Bedingfield 1654; John Gurdon 1654; John Brandling 1654; Alexander Bence 1654; Thomas Bacon 1654; Sir Henry Felton 1656; Henry North 1656; Edmund Harvey 1656; Edward Le Neve 1656; Robert Brewster 1656; Daniel Wall 1656	Succeeded by Sir Henry Felton; Sir Thomas Barnardiston
