= Joseph Brand =

Joseph Brand may refer to:

- Joseph Brand (biologist), American biologist
- Joseph Brand (MP) (1605–1674), English merchant, landowner and politician
