= Bukton =

Bukton is a surname. Notable people with the surname include:

- Robert Bukton, MP for Suffolk (UK Parliament constituency)
- Pierre Bukton (1350–1414), British politician and soldier
