= Samuel Barnardiston =

Samuel Barnardiston may refer to:

- Sir Samuel Barnardiston, 1st Baronet (1620–1707), English Whig MP for Suffolk, Deputy Governor of East India Company
- Sir Samuel Barnardiston, 2nd Baronet (1659–1709), MP for Ipswich
- Sir Samuel Barnardiston, 5th Baronet (1681–1736) of the Barnardiston baronets
