= Nathaniel Barnardiston =

English landowner and politician (1588–1653)

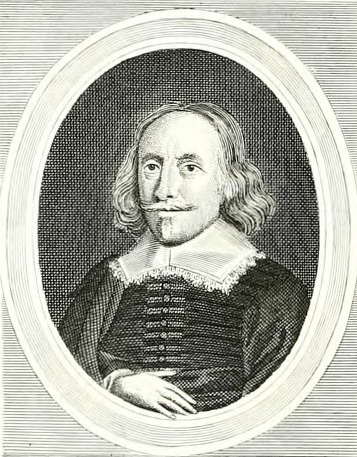
- Born: 1588; Kedington
- Died: 25 July 1653 (aged 64–65); Hackney
- Occupation: Politician
- Spouse(s): Jane Soame
- Children: 10, including Sir Thomas Barnardiston, 1st Baronet and Sir Samuel Barnardiston, 1st Baronet
- Position held: Member of the 1625 Parliament, Member of the 1626 Parliament, Member of the 1628-29 Parliament, Member of the April 1640 Parliament, Member of the 1640-42 Parliament

Sir Nathaniel Barnardiston (1588 – 25 July 1653) of Kedington, alias Ketton, Suffolk, was an English (East Anglian) landowner, magistrate and senior representative of a long-established knightly family, one of the wealthiest in Suffolk, who sat in the House of Commons for Sudbury twice and for the Shire three times between 1625 and 1648. Of Parliamentarian sympathies, he was known for his Christian piety both personally and in managing his household and the parishes under his patronage.

John Burke remarked that he was "esteemed the greatest ornament of his family", and cited Samuel Fairclough, who called him "one of the most eminent patriots of his time, and the twenty-third knight of his family". J.P. Ferris observed, "As a strong parliamentarian and a Presbyterian elder he was the dominant figure in Civil War Suffolk".

== Barnardiston family of Ketton ==
Arms of Barnardiston: Azure, a fess dancettée ermine between six crosses-crosslet argent

The Barnardiston family took its name from the village of Barnardiston in the south-west corner of Suffolk, nearby to Kedington, and claimed a very remote establishment there, possibly from the time of the Norman Conquest. Kedington was formerly held by the de Novo Mercato or Newmarch family, with whom the Barnardistons intermarried during the 13th and 14th centuries. By 1327 the manor of Great Coates, North Lincolnshire, was held by John de Barnardiston, and also remained an important seat of the family.

In 1553, during the reign of Edward VI, Thomas Barnardiston the grandfather of Nathaniel became a ward of the King's tutor Sir John Cheke, who sent him to study with John Calvin in Geneva. "If the Grandfather failed to live according to that education in some part of his life, yet his Grandson endeavoured to live it for him." When Cheke died in 1557 the wardship was purchased by his widow Lady Cheke, and lawsuits ensued between her second husband (Henry Mac Williams) and Thomas Barnardiston over fishing rights at Kedington, which had formerly belonged to the College of Stoke-by-Clare, and were granted to John Cheke by King Edward VI.

== Early life ==
Nathaniel was the eldest surviving son of Sir Thomas Barnardiston of Witham, Essex (son of the Thomas above), and his wife Mary Knightley, daughter of Sir Richard Knightley of Fawsley, Northamptonshire by his first marriage to Mary Fermor. He had younger brothers Arthur and Thomas, and a sister Elizabeth, who reached adulthood. Nathaniel's mother died in March 1594/95, whereupon his father remarried to Katherine Barnardiston (daughter of Thomas Banks of London, Serjeant-at-Law), who had formerly been the wife of Bartholomew Soame. Nathaniel underwent a profound religious awakening while he was at school. His admission to the Inner Temple is recorded in 1606, though he was there in November 1605 as he recalled seeing a group of men walking in the Temple garden, whispering together and looking and acting concerned, whom he afterwards recognized to have been the Gunpowder Plot conspirators.

His father died in 1610 during his own father's lifetime, and was buried at Ketton, where he has a fine knightly effigy on an elaborate tomb. This monument was requisitioned, and a sum of £100 allocated for the purpose, in the will of Dame Katherine of 1633. He left his term of years in the capital messuage at Witham to his widow, and his possession of the parsonage there to her and to his sons while its term endured. Nathaniel therefore did not succeed to the older family estates until the death of his grandfather, Sir Thomas Barnardiston of Clare, Suffolk, in 1619. His stepmother, his father's sole executrix, remarried, and lived until March 1632/33. A baronetcy which was to have been awarded to the elder Sir Thomas in 1611 was for some reason withheld. Nathaniel, who was attentive to him, persuaded him to allow him to present ministers to the livings in their gift, since he would be their patron in future and could appoint men of puritan or presbyterian leanings.

On 16 May 1613 at St Pancras, Soper Lane (City of London) he married Jane, daughter of Sir Stephen Soame (c. 1540-1619) of Little Thurlow, Suffolk (a very wealthy overseas cloth merchant who had been Lord Mayor of London in 1598). Their eldest child was born before 1617. In that year, 1617, he received a commission for sewers (for Suffolk and Essex). He was knighted in December 1618.

Kedington Hall

It is likely that Sir Nathaniel Barnardiston was responsible for rebuilding or remodelling Kedington Hall. The Jacobean residence, which was demolished in the late 18th century, was the subject of a drawing made as a copy of an older illustration, or possibly from memory, during the early 19th century. The drawing was contained in a manuscript history of the Barnardiston family drawn up by Mark Noble (1754-1827) and illustrated by Mrs Mills, wife of the Revd. Thomas Mills, rector of Stutton, Suffolk in 1821-1830. As the only known representation of the Hall, it shows a symmetrical frontage of two storeys, consisting of five bays with a central entrance doorway, and a projecting gabled wing at either end with canted windows (making seven bays in all). The two gables have a shaped, domed form, and two clusters of tall chimneys are visible possibly rising from structures at the rear. A pair of single-storey ranges, detached from the main building, framed the Hall's forecourt, and these had shaped gables matching those of the outer wings of the Hall. These structures, probably only a single room in width, appear to be integral with the design of the Hall and were entered by doorways facing into the courtyard.

== 1620s ==
He received a commission for the peace for Suffolk in 1622 which he held more or less continuously for the rest of his life. By 1623 he was also Deputy lieutenant for the county, and for the year of 1623-24 was Sheriff of Suffolk. In the latter role he so maintained his religious duties as to take his Sheriff's-men to a weekday Lecture each week. He was returned for Sudbury in the parliaments of 1625 and 1626. In 1625 he was appointed one of the commissioners for collection of a general loan enforced without parliamentary consent, but refused to take the required oath or to lend £20, objecting on grounds of conscience. Summoned before the privy council to explain himself in 1627, and for refusing to contribute to Ship money, coat or conduct money, or to lend £20, he was imprisoned for some time in the Gatehouse Prison in London and in a castle in Lincolnshire. Orders for his release, together with his cousin Richard Knightley, John Hampden and others, were given in March 1627/28. He was then returned to parliament in 1628 to represent Suffolk.

Sir Nathaniel took great care to inculcate religious principles into the education and conduct of his children and household, with particular attention paid also to the instruction and character of his domestic servants. During the 1620s he developed a devout respect for Samuel Fairclough (1594-1677), the minister who became pastor to his parish and household. Fairclough, who studied at Queens' College, Cambridge, after graduating in 1615 became resident at Clare, where he continued his studies with the inspirational Richard Blackerby, and where Barnardiston often heard him and admired his teaching. Abraham Gibson, of St John's College, soon after ordination in 1611 had become curate at Witham, and in 1618 was (in the name of Sir Thomas Barnardiston) presented Rector of Kedington, Sir Nathaniel's largest and most proximate benefice.

Fairclough, meanwhile, lectured for the town of King's Lynn, but fell foul of local interests there, and, returning to Clare, married Richard Blackerby's eldest daughter. Sir Nathaniel was determined to recruit him, and in 1623 Fairclough accepted the small rectorate of Barnardiston parish, his patron promising him Kedington when it should become vacant. Sir Nathaniel had a family pew specially built at Barnardiston church so that they could all go to hear Fairclough as well as Gibson. Fairclough was, however, summoned before a High Commission for irregularities of teaching, from which he was not discharged for two years. Dr Gibson, who overmore became a royal chaplain and preacher in the Temple Church, died in 1629: Fairclough was rewarded for his not having reminded his patron of his promise, and succeeded as Rector of Kedington until 1662. As at Barnardiston, his institution at Kedington in 1629 took place without his having to take the oath of canonical obedience, or to subscribe to Whitgift's Three Articles.

== 1630s ==
In 1629 King Charles I began to rule without parliament for eleven years. John Winthrop, aboard the Arbella at Yarmouth, wrote to his son at Groton in April 1630, referring to Sir Nathaniel's wish to put money into their joint stock (the Massachusetts Bay Company). "Remember my love and respect to him, and if he will put in £50, take it as part of the £200 which I have put in already, except you have money enough to supply more," he wrote.

To this period belong the descriptions of his domestic life and devout parental care. There was said to be a blessed conjunction in him: he had "an admirable faculty and easinesse to be intreated, with a great yeildingness of spirit, even to Inferiours, when any good might be done thereby, yet also a strong, resolute unmoveablenesse and stedfastness of mind in opposing all evil in whomsoever." Following his imprisonment, he returned to the magistracy. His family was "a true nursery for the qualifying and accomplishing" of excellence among the Servants: "such, whose Obedience, joyned to their Governours care, produced so rare an effect, that they truly made his House a spiritual church and Temple, wherein were daily offered up the spiritual Sacrifices of Reading the Word; of Prayer, morning and evening, of singing of Psalms constantly after every meal, before any Servant did rise from the Table: also the chiefest of them did usually, after every Sermon they heard, call the rest into the Buttery (a place of most disorder in other Houses), and there repeat the Sermon unto the rest, before they were called to the repetition of it in their Masters presence."

During the 1630s Barnardiston's children were in their youth. He is said to have spoken to his children in tears about the godly example of his father (who had died untimely young), saying what a debt he felt towards him. He paid special attention to their spiritual education, "in the most exact and strict way of pure and paternal religion", stirring them up to a strict watchfulness over themselves and a closer walking with God. After giving them his gracious instruction, he would take them together into his closet to pray. He would never correct them while in his displeasure, but would wait for his temper to cool before reproving them, so that they only knew of his anger by his silence. On their returning from travels, he told them he was far happier to find the grace of regeneration in them, than to hear that they had enlarged their estates: and he urged all his children, if they should have differences, to submit themselves to the arbitration of their siblings and to accept each others' judgement in such matters.

Through his work together with Fairclough, Kedington became a pattern or example to the neighbouring towns. "The Magistracy and Ministry joined both together and concurred in all things for the promoting of true Piety and Godlinesse... Great was the Love, and intimate was the affection which passed between the Patron of the Living, and this minister, so that they did mutually ingage to visit each other twice (at least) each week, and did seldom meet without praying together before they did part." He encouraged the parishioners of Kedington to instruct their children and servants by catechism. He prepared carefully before taking the Sacrament at Holy Communion, and led the Kedington congregation in proposing that every communicant should first publicly declare their faith and their acceptance of the baptism vows, in order to deter the common practise of openly wicked persons receiving the Lord's Supper. He was accustomed to pray privately three times a day, and he annually commemorated the day of Queen Elizabeth I's accession to the Crown of England, "to the glorious rescuing of the Reformed Religion from the bloody designs of the inhumane Papists. He also did every year observe and celebrate the Fifth of November, with all becoming expressions of Joy, from the wonderful deliverance from the Gun-Powder Treason..."

In 1633 Nathaniel's stepmother, Dame Katherine Barnardiston of Witham, who had remarried, died and in her will established three scholarships particularly favouring her Barnardiston kinred at St Catharine's College, Cambridge. Nathaniel's eldest son, Thomas (born before 1620) matriculated as a fellow-commoner from St Catharine's College at Michaelmas 1633, and on 1 May 1635 he was admitted to Gray's Inn together with his cousin Nathaniel Parker, son of Dame Jane's sister Marcy Soame and Sir Calthrop Parker of Erwarton, Suffolk. In her will Dame Katherine had also given £200 to Stephen Marshall, the puritan vicar of Finchingfield in Essex, for him to bestow as he thought fitting. Marshall was a graduate of Emmanuel College, Cambridge, and had been resident in Clare before becoming curate at Wethersfield, Essex in March 1620, and going to Finchingfield in 1625: the Anglican vicar general of London considered that Marshall governed "the consciences of all the rich puritans in these parts and in many places far remote." He was considered a dangerous man, involved with John Stoughton, Samuel Hartlib and others in the distribution of puritan funds: this bequest was probably intended to support godly ministers either in England or in New England.

== 1640s ==
In April 1640 Sir Nathaniel was re-elected as Knight of the Shire for Suffolk, for the Short Parliament, and again in November 1640 for the Long Parliament. Long circumstantial accounts of the election at Ipswich in autumn 1640 were published within an essay by Thomas Carlyle. His eldest son, Thomas Barnardiston, who was knighted by Charles I in 1641, nonetheless shared his father's parliamentary sympathies. His third son, Samuel Barnardiston, was (according to the historian Rapin, or his editor) in a crowd of crop-haired apprentices protesting in Westminster in December 1641 against the Bishops and against Colonel Thomas Lunsford's repressive methods, when the Queen, looking out from her window, remarked of Samuel, "See what a handsome young Roundhead is there", from which the use of this name for the Parliamentarians arose. Yet Sir Nathaniel himself, both in his portrait and his funeral monument, is shown with flowing hair.

Receiving a commission for the subsidy in Suffolk in 1641, in the following year he was again a Deputy Lieutenant for the county. He subscribed £700, and loaned a further £500, to the Parliament towards the costs of bringing the Irish rebels under control. It was agreed that this should be repaid at 8% out of the first payments of the Parliamentary subsidy of 1642, but remained partly unpaid in 1645. Barnardiston took the Covenant in 1643, became Party assessor for Suffolk, and joined the Eastern Counties Association. Although he did not participate actively in the war, he maintained close communication with leading Parliamentarians. His position in the Committee, which brought him dealings with his staunch friend Sir William Spring, and in which his son Sir Thomas Barnardiston (who became a Parliamentary soldier) participated, reflected his status as a leading figure among the gentry and magistracy.

The Commons gave approval for the payment of the balance of his loan to them in May 1645. In that year his son Sir Thomas was returned as Member of Parliament for Bury St Edmunds, which he continued to represent until 1653. Sir Nathaniel, who received commissions relating to the Liberty of St Edmund in 1644 and to the Liberty of St Etheldreda in 1645, also had oyer and terminer and gaol delivery in Essex in the latter year, and was a commissioner for sewers in Middlesex. He was, with Henry North of Mildenhall, an elder of the Clare classis of the Presbyterian organization. He also held commissions in 1646 for Exclusions from the Sacrament and in 1648 for Scandalous offences. He is not recorded as sitting in parliament after Pride's Purge in 1648, but in 1649 held a commission for drainage of the Fens.

== Last years ==
Sir Nathaniel's health began to fail soon after the execution of the King. Sensing the approach of death, on 10 September 1651 he prepared his will, which opens with a formal short prayer: "Bountifull good God, whoe alone orderest and disposeth all things, Soe guide mee and direct mee in the setling of that Estate which of thy great goodnesse thou hast blessed mee with, as may be for thy glory, and comfort of those that shall enioy itt through Christ Jesus Amen." He wished that his body, which had been a Temple of the Holy Spirit, should be wrapped in lead, if possible together with that of his father, and giving "forty pounds for the making of a vault in Ketton for the interring of mee and mine." Among his legacies he refers to investments in the East India Company, and to his seven hundred pounds adventured in lands in Ireland. He asks that Samuel Fairclough should watch over his children's spiritual development, and gives £30 "to be paid by tenn pounds a yeare for the bringing upp of children in living in the Colledge of New England," apparently a reference to Harvard College. He concludes, "And now blessed bee my God who hath given mee a hart and time to finish this worke, I conclude with oulde Simeons song, Now lett thy servant depart in peace, for mine eyes have seene thy Salvation, Amen, Come Lord Jesus come quickly."

After writing his will it was observed that "he seemed to have little to do, than to be gone to the better world", though he lived for two years after. He was at Hackney when a swelling appeared on his neck which was the harbinger of death. He summoned Samuel Fairclough from Suffolk to walk and confer with him on the worth and immortality of the soul, and of how it should subsist and act, when separated from the body; and of the joys of the other world, and of the vanity and emptiness of everything in this. At their parting he said to Fairclough,

"Sir, I now much wonder that any man who fully believes these things to be realities, and not meer notions (being in my condition) should be unwilling to dye; for my owne parte, I will not be so flattered with any carnal content[ment], as to be desirous to live longer in this World, where there is little hope left that the Lord hath any more work or service for me to do, except it be to suffer for keeping a good Conscience, in witnessing against the Apostacys and impieties of the Times; and now it is a great favour of God to be sent for speedily."

He then moved to London to be near his physicians, and at this time he read continually in Richard Baxter's lengthy work of theological contemplation, The Saints' Everlasting Rest. Increasingly he was unable to attend formal services. On the day before his death his children and his brother gathered around his bed, and he gave them his last advice, bidding them to avoid wordliness and vainglory; to continue in love and unity together, amending each others' ways charitably; advising them not to fall away from truth and godliness because the Times were opposed to them; and commending to them the reading of the scriptures in conjunction with regular prayer. At his sons' requests he spoke to them lovingly of matters to be amended in their characters. As death approached he became filled with joy, and when his second son (Nathaniel) bade him be cheerful, he replied, "Son, I thank the Lord, I am so chearful in my heart, that I could laugh whilst my sides ake." Looking forward to meeting his Saviour, he acknowledged the sense of inward joy. Then, after saying "I have peace within", and lying awhile as if asleep, he opened his eyes again, raised his hands towards heaven, and (in the words of his biographer) "fell asleep in the Lord".

== Memorials and remnants ==
Sir Nathaniel Barnardiston died on 25 July, having lived fully 65 years, and his body was carried from London to Suffolk for burial. About 200 people met the progress at twenty miles from his home, and his funeral at Kedington on 26 August 1653 was attended, it is said, by thousands. The elder Samuel Fairclough delivered the funeral sermon for Sir Nathaniel, his patron, and from this portrait of his character was derived the Life of him which was included in Samuel Clarke's Lives of Eminent Persons. A volume of elegies and acrostic poems, entitled Suffolk's Tears, was also printed in honour of Sir Nathaniel in 1653. The full title of Suffolk's Tears refers to his "large and extraordinary bounty towards the advancing of Religion and Learning, both at home, and in Forreign Plantations among the Heathen."

Additional biographical information is found in the Life of the elder Fairclough, also printed by Clarke. There are four Barnardiston vaults under Kedington church, all approached through a single subterraneous vestibule. When opened in 1915, the well-preserved lead coffins of Sir Nathaniel and Lady Jane Barnardiston were found in the southern or south-eastern chambers. His bore the inscription, "Sir Nathaniel Barnardiston, Knight, died 25th July, 1653", and hers read "The most pious and prudent the Lady Jane, wife to the religious Knight, Sir Nathaniel Barnardiston, who died ye 17th August, 1669, in ye 78 yeare of her age."

Monument

In the church of St Peter and St Paul, Kedington there is a fine wall monument to Sir Nathaniel and Dame Jane Barnardiston, set between two windows of the north aisle. Framed at either side by upright hanging festoons of sculpted fruit and flowers, the central panels show (below), supported on a pair of dark consoles, a black-framed white marble panel carrying the memorial inscription, as if forming the inscribed frontage of a tomb-chest.

Above this is a recessed upper frame containing half-length figures in the round of Sir Nathaniel and Dame Jane, as in life, shown frontally but in an informal pose, he resting on his elbow with his head cupped in his hand, leaning towards the outer side of the frame, and she similarly on the sinister side. At the centre, his left hand rests over her right hand, which rests upon a skull. Above them, beneath a horizontal entablature, three cherubim look out from suspended white swags of sculpted cloth applied to the dark backing-stone.

Free-standing above the upper moulding are a pair of sculpted urns, and some small skulls, set either side of an oval escutcheon in a foliate surround showing the impalement of Barnardiston (dexter: Azure, a fess indented ermine, between six cross-crosslets argent) with Soame (sinister: Gules, a chevron between three mallets or). Beneath the lower table, forming the tailpiece of the monument, is a series of 8 polychrome shield-shaped escutcheons bearing impalements for Barnardiston: with a single skull beneath.

== Family ==
Sir Nathaniel married Jane Soame, daughter of Sir Stephen Soame of Little Thurlow, Suffolk, and died at the age of 65. Dame Jane lived until 1669, when she left, among other things, her two silver tobacco boxes and her silver tobacco-tongs to her daughters Rolt and Bloyse. Their children were:

- Anne Barnardiston (before 1617 - 1691), who married Sir John Rolt, of Milton Ernest, Bedfordshire. Their son Thomas Rolt was elected Fellow of the Royal Society in 1664.
- Sir Thomas Barnardiston (died 1669), MP and baronet, married Anne, daughter of Sir William Armine, 1st Baronet of Osgodby, Lincolnshire.
- Nathaniel Barnardiston of Hackney, London, married Elizabeth, daughter of Nathaniel Bacon of Friston, Suffolk. He died in 1680.
- Sir Samuel Barnardiston (1620-1707), MP and baronet, married (1) Thomasin (died 1654), daughter of Joseph Brand of Edwardstone, Suffolk, and (2) Mary, daughter of Sir Abraham Reynardson, the Lord Mayor of London deposed in 1649.
- unnamed daughter, died in infancy.
- Stephen Barnardiston, died in infancy.
- John Barnardiston
- Pelethiah Barnardiston of Hackney, buried at Ketton 1679: married Martha, daughter of Richard Turnor of Totteridge, Hertfordshire. Martha remarried to William Bird of Hackney, and died in 1707.
- William Barnardiston of London, merchant, died at Aleppo.
- Jane Barnardiston (as recorded in the Blois MSS) married first John Brooke (died 1653), son of Sir Robert Brooke (1572-1646) of Cockfield Hall, Yoxford, and secondly to Sir William Blois (the younger), who had previously been married to John Brooke's sister Martha Brooke (who died in childbirth in 1657 leaving Sir William with his heir (Sir) Charles Blois). Jane, therefore, having already been the daughter-in-law of the dowager of Cockfield, the religious writer Elizabeth Brooke (who lived on there until 1683), became stepmother to the future (1693) Blois heir to Cockfield Hall. She is called "my daughter Brooke" in her father's will of 1653 and "my daughter Bloyse" in her mother's, of 1669.

All ten of these children are shown by name in the engraved illustration of Sir Nathaniel's arms which forms the frontispiece to the fourth book of Sylvanus Morgan's Sphere of Gentry, entitled Insignia Dignissimi Dom: D: Nathanaelis Barnardiston, Equitis Aurati.

Parliament of England
Preceded by Sir Robert Naunton; Sir Robert Crane, 1st Baronet	Member of Parliament for Suffolk; 1625–1629; With: Sir William Spring	Parliament suspended until 1640
Vacant Parliament suspended since 1629	Member of Parliament for Suffolk; 1640–1648; With: Sir Philip Parker	Not represented in the Rump Parliament
