= Thomas Chaplin =

Thomas Chaplin may refer to:

- Thomas Chaplin (MP for Bury St Edmunds) (1591–1672), English draper and politician
- Thomas Chaplin (MP for Stamford) (1794–1863), British politician and Army officer
- Tom Chaplin (born 1979), English singer-songwriter, musician and composer
