= Roger Drury =

Roger Drury may refer to:

- Roger Drury (died 1420), MP for Suffolk
- Roger Drury (died 1599), MP for Great Yarmouth
- Roger Wolcott Drury (born 1914), winner of the 1979 Mark Twain Readers Award
