= North baronets =

Baronetcy in the Baronetage of the United Kingdom

There have been three baronetcies created for persons with the surname North, one in the Baronetage of England and two in the Baronetage of the United Kingdom. Two creations are extinct while one is extant. The last creation passed into the North family through marriage.

The North Baronetcy, of Mildenhall in the County of Suffolk, was created in the Baronetage of England on 14 June 1660 for Henry North. He represented Suffolk in the House of Commons. The second Baronet also sat as member of parliament for this constituency. On his death in 1695 the title became extinct.

The Hicking, later North Baronetcy, of Southwell in the County of Nottingham, was created in the Baronetage of the United Kingdom on 1 March 1920 for William Hicking, Chairman of the Nottingham and Notts Banking Company. He had already been granted a baronetcy in 1917 with normal remainder to the heirs male of his body. The 1920 creation was created with remainder to the sons of his daughters, and the heirs male of their bodies. On Hicking's death in 1947, the creation of 1917 became extinct while he was succeeded in the 1920 creation according to the special remainder by his grandson Jonathan North, the second holder of the title. He was the son of Muriel, younger daughter of the first Baronet, and her husband the Hon. John Montagu William North, second son of Frederick North, 8th Earl of Guilford. Consequently, he was also in remainder to the earldom of Guilford and its subsidiary title the barony of Guilford. He was succeeded by his son in 2018.

== North baronets, of Mildenhall (1660) ==
- Sir Henry North, 1st Baronet (c. 1609–1671)
- Sir Henry North, 2nd Baronet (died 1695)

Coat of arms of North of Mildenhall
Escutcheon Argent, semée of lozenges vert, a bordure gules.

== Hicking baronets, of Southwell (1917) ==
- Sir William Norton Hicking, 1st Baronet (1865–1947)

Coat of arms of Hicking of Southwell
Crest A dexter arm embowed in armour argent, garnished sable, the gauntlet holding the blade of a sword proper between two lozenges as in the arms. Escutcheon Argent, semée of lozenges vert, a bordure gules. Motto All things are overcome by diligence

== Hicking, later North baronets, of Southwell (1920) ==
- Sir William Norton Hicking, 1st Baronet (1865–1947)
- Sir William Jonathan Frederick North, 2nd Baronet (1931–2018)
- Sir Jeremy William Francis North, 3rd Baronet (born 1960)

The heir apparent is the present holder's son Jocelyn Montagu Dudley North (born 1989).

== See also ==
- Earl of Guilford
