= Sir William Spring, 1st Baronet =

17th-century English Parliamentarian politician

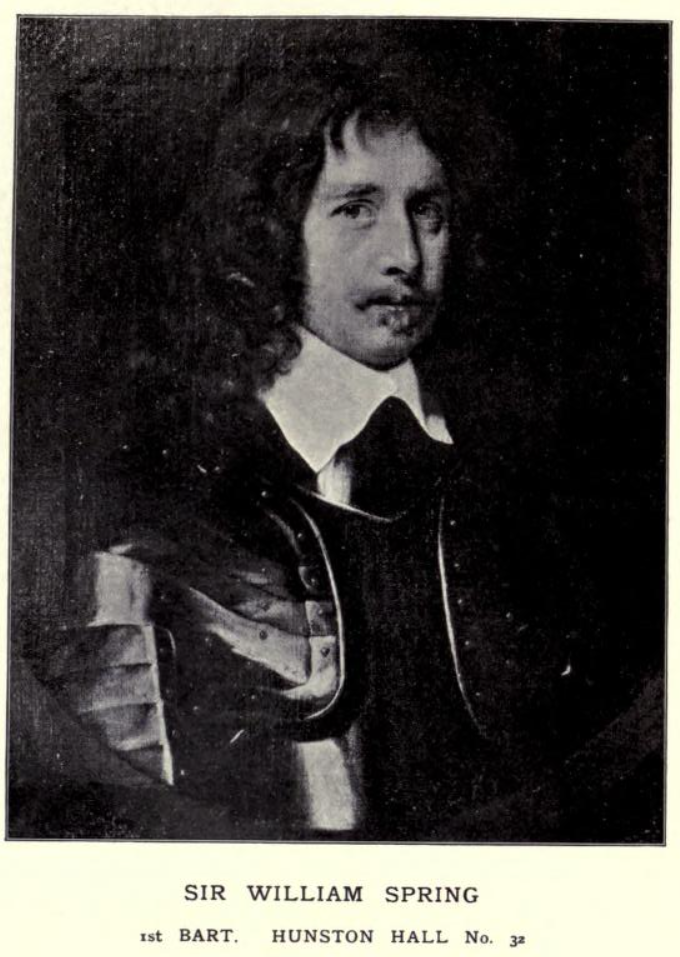
- Sir William Spring, from a portrait by Cornelius Johnson
- Born: 13 March 1613; Pakenham, Suffolk
- Died: 17 December 1654 (aged 41); Pakenham, Suffolk
- Buried: St Mary's Church, Pakenham, Suffolk
- Father: Sir William Spring
- Mother: Elizabeth Smith
- Occupation: Politician and landowner

Sir William Spring, 1st Baronet (13 March 1613 – 17 December 1654) was an English landowner and politician. During the English Civil War, he was one of the leading Parliamentarian officials in East Anglia. He was the Member of Parliament for Bury St Edmunds before being removed during Pride's Purge in 1648, but was returned to the House of Commons as the MP for Suffolk shortly before his death in 1654.

== Early life ==
Spring was born into the Spring family in Pakenham, Suffolk in 1613, a descendant of the clothier Thomas Spring of Lavenham. Spring was the son of Sir William Spring (died March 1638) and his wife Elizabeth Smith. He was brought up in a fervently Puritan household and his father was a close associate of Richard Sibbes. Like his father, he was educated at Emmanuel College, Cambridge, but left without a degree. The only surviving son, he inherited extensive estates in Suffolk from his father, including Pakenham Hall and Cockfield Hall.

In October 1640 Spring stood for election in Bury St Edmunds, but was defeated in the face of the superior influence of his relations, the Jermyns. In 1641 he served as High Sheriff of Suffolk, during which time he was knighted by Charles I. Towards the end of his year in office, the king also granted Spring a hereditary title, creating him a baronet, of Pakenham in the Baronetage of England, on 11 August 1641. This was despite Spring's sympathies for the parliamentary opposition to Charles I being known at court, and may have been a ploy by the king to win Spring's support. Nonetheless Spring remained committed to Parliament and in January 1642 he and Maurice Barrow were ordered by Parliament to search Hengrave Hall, the house of his cousin, Lady Penelope Darcy, where it was thought arms for a Catholic insurrection were being stored. At some point in the early 1640s he purchased Newe House from Sir Robert Bright. In April 1642 he was made a justice of the peace for Suffolk and he was a deputy lieutenant of the county by September that year.

== Roundhead official ==
During the English Civil War, Spring was among Parliament's most active supporters in East Anglia. Following the outbreak of hostilities in October 1642, he was appointed to all the local commissions in Suffolk organised to prosecute the war against Charles I. Spring travelled the eastern counties of England, helping to recruit soldiers to the Parliamentarian army and maintain Parliament's control of East Anglia. In late 1642, he and Samuel Moody raised over £7,500 from among Suffolk residents as a contribution to the Roundhead war chest. In January 1643 he was among those who met in Bury St Edmunds to decide the organisation of the new Eastern Association.

He was in regular correspondence with Oliver Cromwell, who notably wrote to Spring regarding the Good Old Cause. In the summer of 1643, Spring refused to recognise a troop of Ironsides raised by Captain Raphe Margery, as Spring deemed Margery, who was not from a gentry family, to be too low-born to lead men into battle. Cromwell intervened, telling Spring that he did not care which social class his soldiers came from, as long as they believed in Parliament's cause. In September 1643, Cromwell wrote to Spring, saying: "I had rather have a plain russet-coated captain that knows what he fights for, and loves what he knows, than that which you call a gentleman and is nothing else".

In February 1644, he was appointed a joint-treasurer and receiver-general of the Eastern Association by the Earl of Manchester. Following the Bury Conference in January 1645, Spring was sent by the Eastern Association to lobby the Committee of Both Kingdoms regarding the introduction of the New Model Army.

A devout Presbyterian by the 1640s, throughout 1644 Spring served on the Suffolk Committees for Scandalous Ministers, charged with purging the Suffolk clergy of those thought to be politically or theologically suspect. In November 1644 he wrote to the Committee of Both Kingdoms to express his concern at what he perceived to be the growing number of radical antinomians and anabaptists in East Anglia. Spring was among the Suffolk leaders in May 1645 who instructed local constables to enforce use of the Directory for Public Worship in the county. He was a staunch friend of Sir Nathaniel Barnardiston of Kedington, a notable advocate of the Puritan cause, upon whose death he wrote an acrostic elegy.

== Member of Parliament ==
In October 1645, Spring was elected to the Long Parliament as Member of Parliament for Bury St Edmunds in a recruiter election. On 25 February 1646 he took the Solemn League and Covenant. His voting record in the Commons was strongly influenced by his Presbyterian beliefs and in November 1646 he was appointed to a committee to oversee the selling of the estates of bishops. On 5 September 1646 Spring was among the delegation sent by parliament to the City of London to raise £200,000 needed to pay off the Scots Army in England.

By the spring of 1647, Spring's ill-health had reduced his attendance at Westminster. In June 1648, he was despatched by parliament to shore up Roundhead support in East Anglia during royalist resistance at the Siege of Colchester. Spring was among the MPs secluded from the Commons by Pride's Purge in December 1648. While his name remained on the commission of the peace, he played no further part in the work of the local commissions after the purge.

In July 1654, Spring was one of 18 men who stood for election to the ten seats allocated to Suffolk by the Instrument of Government. In the election he came second and was again returned to Westminster as an MP. The First Protectorate Parliament assembled in September 1654 but Spring is not recorded as having played any part in its proceedings, likely as a result of his declining health. He died at Pakenham on 17 December 1654 and was buried two days later, leaving large debts to his wife and young family. The debts were dealt with by the sale of some lands at Cockfield. Spring was succeeded in his title and estates by his eldest son, William Spring, who also served as an MP for Suffolk.

== Family ==
On 3 November 1636, Spring married Elizabeth L'Estrange, the daughter of Lady Alice and Sir Hamon L'Estrange, with whom he had six children:

- Sir William Spring, 2nd Baronet (1642–1684), married first Mary, daughter of Dudley North, 4th Baron North (no issue) and married second Sarah, daughter of Sir Robert Cordell, 1st Baronet of Melford Hall, Suffolk, with whom he had three children.
- Thomas Spring, died unmarried in 1677, Fellow of Gonville and Caius College, Cambridge
- John Spring, became a politician in Watertown MA
- Elizabeth Spring, died unmarried
- Catherine Spring, married (1st) Capt. Laurence, (2nd) John Palgrave
- Dorothy Spring (1648–1714/15), married Sir Christopher Calthorpe in 1664

== Ancestry ==
Ancestors of Sir William Spring, 1st Baronet

32. Sir Thomas Spring
16. Sir John Spring
33. Anna King
8. Sir William Spring of Lavenham
34. Sir William Waldegrave
17. Dorothy Waldengrave
4. John Spring
36. Robert Kitson of Warton
18. Sir Thomas Kytson
9. Anne Kytson
19. Margaret Donnington, Countess of Bath
2. Sir William Spring of Ridenhall
10. Sir John Trelawny
5. Mary Trelawny
1. Sir William Spring, 1st Baronet
6. Sir William Smith
3. Elizabeth Smith
7. Elizabeth Smith

Parliament of England
Preceded by Thomas Jermyn; Henry Jermyn	Member of Parliament for Bury St Edmunds; 1646–1648; With: Sir Thomas Barnardiston, Bt	Succeeded by Samuel Moody; John Clarke
Preceded by Jacob Caley; Francis Brewster; Robert Dunkon; John Clarke; Edward Plumstead	Member of Parliament for Suffolk; 1654; With: Sir Thomas Barnardiston, Bt; Sir Thomas Bedingfield; William Bloys; John Gurdon; William Gibbes; John Brandling; Alexander Bence; John Sicklemore; Thomas Bacon	Succeeded by Sir Thomas Barnardiston, Bt; Henry Felton; Henry Northt; Edmund Harvey; Edward Le Neve; John Sicklemore; William Bloys; William Gibbes; Robert Brewster; Daniel Wall
Political offices
Preceded by Sir Simonds d'Ewes	High Sheriff of Suffolk; 1641	Succeeded by Sir William Castleton
Baronetage of England
New creation	Baronet (of Pakenham); 1641–1654	Succeeded by Sir William Spring
