= Elmham =

Elmham may refer to:

== Places ==
- The See of Elmham, the ecclesiastical jurisdiction of the Bishop of Elmham
- North Elmham
- South Elmham

== Surname ==
- Thomas Elmham
- William Elmham
