= John Wright (Ipswich MP) =

John Wright (9 April 1615 – 29 November 1683) was an M.P. for Ipswich, between 9 November 1670 and 16 March 1685. He served with William Blois, Gilbert Lindfield and Sir John Barker, respectively.

He was originally from East London.

Parliament of England
Preceded by John Sicklemore and William Blois	Member of Parliament for Ipswich; 1670–1685; With: William Blois, Gilbert Lindfield and Sir John Barker	Succeeded by Sir Nicholas Bacon and Sir John Barker
