= Barnardiston baronets =

Extinct baronetcy in the Baronetage of England

There have been two baronetcies created for members of the Barnardiston family, both in the Baronetage of England. Both creations are extinct.

Escutcheon of the Barnardiston baronets

The Barnardiston Baronetcy, of Ketton in the County of Suffolk, was created in the Baronetage of England on 7 April 1663 for Thomas Barnardiston, Member of Parliament for Bury St Edmunds and Suffolk and the son of Sir Nathaniel Barnardiston. The second Baronet was member of parliament for Grimsby and Sudbury. The title became extinct on the death of the sixth Baronet in 1745.

The Barnardiston Baronetcy, of Brightwell in the County of Suffolk, was created in the Baronetage of England on 11 May 1663 for Samuel Barnardiston, Member of Parliament for Suffolk, with remainder, firstly, in default of male issue of his own to his brother Nathaniel Barnardiston and the heirs male of his body, and secondly, to his brother Peletiah Barnardiston and the heirs male of his body. He was the younger brother of the first Baronet of Ketton. Barnardiston died childless and was succeeded according to the special remainder by his nephew, Samuel, the second Baronet, the son of Nathaniel Barnardiston. He sat as member of parliament for Ipswich. He died childless and was succeeded by his younger brother, Peletiah, the third Baronet. The title became extinct on the death of the fourth Baronet in 1712.

== Barnardiston baronets, of Ketton (1663) ==
- Sir Thomas Barnardiston, 1st Baronet (c. 1618–1669)
- Sir Thomas Barnardiston, 2nd Baronet (c. 1646–1698)
- Sir Thomas Barnardiston, 3rd Baronet (1674–1700)
- Sir Robert Bardnardiston, 4th Baronet (c. 1676–1728)
- Sir Samuel Barnardiston, 5th Baronet (1681–1736)
- Sir John Barnardiston, 6th Baronet (died 1745)

== Barnardiston baronets, of Brightwell (1663) ==
- Sir Samuel Barnardiston, 1st Baronet (1620–1707)
- Sir Samuel Barnardiston, 2nd Baronet (1660–1710)
- Sir Peletiah Barnardiston, 3rd Baronet (1663–1712)
- Sir Nathaniel Barnardiston, 4th Baronet (1672–1712)

== See also ==
- Barnardiston family (medieval aristocracy)
