= Sir Thomas Barnardiston, 1st Baronet =

English baronet, landowner, soldier and MP

Sir Thomas Barnardiston, 1st Baronet (died 14 October 1669) was an English baronet, landowner, soldier and MP who sat in the House of Commons at various times between 1640 and 1659. He fought on the Parliamentary side in the English Civil War.

== Biography ==
Barnardiston was the son of Sir Nathaniel Barnardiston of Kedington ("Ketton"), Suffolk and his wife Jane, daughter of Sir Stephen Soame, Lord Mayor of London. His brother was Sir Samuel Barnardiston, 1st Bart. of Brightwell, Suffolk. He matriculated from St Catharine's College, Cambridge in Autumn 1633 and was admitted at Gray's Inn on 1 May 1635.

Barnardiston was knighted in 1641 but fought on the side of parliament in the Civil War. In 1645, he was elected Member of Parliament for Bury St. Edmunds in the Long Parliament and survived Pride's Purge. He commanded a foot regiment of the Suffolk Trained Bands at the Siege of Colchester in 1648. In 1654 he was elected one of the MPs for Suffolk for the First Protectorate Parliament and in 1656 in the Second Protectorate Parliament. He was re-elected in 1659 for the Third Protectorate Parliament and reattended as a member for Bury St Edmunds in the Restored Rump Parliament in 1659.

Barnardiston married Anne Airmine, daughter of Sir William Airmine, 1st Baronet of Osgodby in South Kesteven, Lincolnshire. He supported the Restoration of the Monarchy, and was created 1st Baronet of Ketton by King Charles II on 7 April 1663. He died in 1669 and was buried at Kedington. He was succeeded by his son Sir Thomas (1646–1698). His daughter Anne became the second wife of the traveller Sir Philip Skippon (1641-1691) of Wrentham and Edwardstone in Suffolk.

Parliament of England
Preceded by Sir Thomas Jermyn; Henry Jermyn	Member of Parliament for Bury St. Edmunds; 1645–1653; With: Sir William Spring 1645–1648	Succeeded by Not represented in the Barebones Parliament
Preceded by Jacob Caley; Francis Brewster; Robert Dunkon; John Clark; Edward Plumstead	Member of Parliament for Suffolk; 1654–1659; With: Sir William Spring 1654; Sir Thomas Bedingfield 1654; William Blois 1654–1656; John Gurdon 1654; William Gibbes 1654–1656; John Brandling 1654; Alexander Bence 1654; John Sicklemore 1654–1656; Thomas Bacon 1654; Henry Felton 1656–1659; Henry North 1656; Edmund Harvey 1656; Edward Le Neve 1656; Robert Brewster 1656; Daniel Wall 1656	Succeeded by Not represented in restored Rump
Baronetage of England
New creation	Baronet (of Ketton); 1663–1669	Succeeded by Thomas Barnardiston
