= Gilbert Debenham (died 1481) =

Gilbert Debenham (c. 1405 - 10 May 1481) was a Member of Parliament for Suffolk. He was connected to the Duke of Norfolk. He was described in 1444 as 'that able and unscrupulous villain.' In 1427, he was Sheriff of Norfolk and Suffolk. He was the Member of Parliament for Suffolk in 1427, 1432, 1437, 1442, 1449 and 1453-4 and for Ipswich 1450–1.
