= Thomas Bacon (politician) =

17th-century English politician

Thomas Bacon (c. 1620 – 1697) was an English lawyer and politician who sat in the House of Commons of England in 1654-1655 and 1660-1661.

== Biography ==
Bacon was the son of Nathaniel Bacon of Friston, Suffolk, and his wife Anne Le Gros, daughter of Sir Thomas Le Gros of Crostwick, Norfolk. He was a student of Corpus Christi College, Cambridge in 1637. He entered Gray's Inn in May 1640 and was called to the bar in 1651. In 1654 he was elected Member of Parliament (MP) for Suffolk in the First Protectorate Parliament. He was elected MP for Aldeburgh, Suffolk in 1660 for the Convention Parliament.

By his first wife Elizabeth, daughter of Sir Robert Brooke of Cockfield Hall, Yoxford, and his wife Elizabeth, he was the father of Nathaniel Bacon (1647-1676), the Virginian colonist leader of Bacon's Rebellion. They also had a daughter. Elizabeth dying in 1649, he married the second time to Martha, daughter of Sir John Reade of Wrangle, Lincolnshire (and widow of Edward Empson of Boston, Lincolnshire), by whom he had another daughter.

Making his will in 1695, he had by then removed to Wandsworth, but still held Alderton Hall Farm in Suffolk, with the mill and mill-house, and the advowson of the church of Alderton. These he gave to his granddaughter Mary Bacon, with payments to his grandchildren Nathaniel, Thomas, Mary and Martha Andrew out of the corn tithes of Snape and Friston. Thomas received his library of books, and Mary (Bacon) "my Mother Pearl cabinet, and that therein, which being her Grandmothers is likest to be most valued by her". (This most likely refers to Thomas Bacon's wife Elizabeth Brooke.) Thomas Andrew and Mary Bacon (who married Hugh Chamberlain) were his executors at his probate in 1699.

| Preceded by Jacob Caley; Francis Brewster; Robert Dunkon; John Clark; Edward Plumstead | MP for Suffolk; 1654–1655; With: Sir William Spring; Sir Thomas Barnardiston; Sir Thomas Bedingfield; William Bloys; John Gurdon; William Gibbes; John Brandling; Alexander Bence; John Sicklemore | Succeeded by Sir Thomas Barnardiston; Henry Felton; Henry North; Edmund Harvey; Edward Le Neve; John Sicklemore; William Bloys; William Gibbes; Robert Brewster; Daniel Wall |
| Preceded by Laurence Oxburgh; John Bence | MP for Aldeburgh; 1660–1661; With: Sir Robert Brooke | Succeeded by Sir Robert Brooke; Sir John Holland |
