= Anthony Bedingfield =

English merchant and politician

Anthony Bedingfield (died 1651) was an English merchant and politician who sat in the House of Commons from 1640 to 1648.

Bedingfield was the son of Thomas Bedingfield of Ditchingham Hall, Norfolk and his wife Dorothy Southwell. He became a member of the Worshipful Company of Mercers in the City of London.

In April 1640, Bedingfield was elected Member of Parliament for Dunwich in the Short Parliament. He was re-elected in November 1640 for Dunwich in the Long Parliament

On 16 July 1650 Bedingfield became an alderman for the City of London for Langbourn Ward. He became Master of the Mercers' Company in 1651. He died in 1651 and was buried at Holme Hale on 27 October 1651.

Parliament of England
Vacant Parliament suspended since 1629	Member of Parliament for Dunwich; 1640–1648; With: Henry Coke 1640–1645; Robert Brewster 1645–1648	Succeeded by Robert Brewster
