= John Barrington (MP for Dunwich) =

English politician

John Barrington (born ca. 1624, date of death unknown) was an English politician who sat in the House of Commons in 1659.

Barrington was the son of Henry Barrington, described as suffragan bishop of Colchester. He was admitted at Pembroke College, Cambridge on 28 February 1639 aged 15 and was awarded BA in 1643. He was later described as of Westminster. In 1659, he was elected Member of Parliament for Dunwich in the Third Protectorate Parliament.

Parliament of England
Preceded by Francis Brewster	Member of Parliament for Dunwich; 1659; With: Robert Brewster	Succeeded by Robert Brewster
