= John Braham (MP) =

English landowner and MP

John Braham (also Brame) (died 1420) was an English landowner who served as a Member of Parliament (MP) for Suffolk in 1417. Although little is known of his early life or background, he is known to have spent most of his career in royal service abroad, often as part of the Hundred Years War, fighting in Brittany, Portugal, Spain and Ireland as well as France. However, his service did not bring him the riches that it brought to others, and he is known to have spent much of his life impoverished; often in court over unpaid debts, it is possible that he lived beyond his means much of the time. He had been knighted by 1381 and had married the widow of another Suffolk gentleman by 1393. He died in 1420.

== Background ==
Little is known of Braham's birth or upbringing, although he was probably born before 1377. His family were historic lords of the manor of the Suffolk village of Brantham. His father and namesake was a retainer of the Earls of Oxford, and this knight's fee supplied Braham with a small income. He is known to have married Joan née Spyce, widow of Thomas Visdelou, another member of the Suffolk gentry, based in Shotley by May 1393.

In adulthood, he appears to have been in a weak position financially for most of his career. In December 1392 he borrowed the large sum of £300 (equivalent to £300,000 in 2025) from 1392 from the influential Suffolk merchant, Clement Spice. Spice also purchased land in Brantham of Braham's behalf, and later acted as Braham's mainpernor for the wardship of the heir of It may be that Braham reciprocated by recommending Spice to Michael de la Pole, Earl of Suffolk at the time the King's favourite and most powerful man at court.

== Military career ==
Much of Braham's career was spent in royal service abroad during the Hundred Years War, and he saw action seven different theatres of war. His first commission appears to have been as a man at arms, based in Portsmouth under the Sheriff of Buckinghamshire, in defence of the south coast against an expected French invasion. The following year he served under Robert Knolles in France in 1369, probably in Brittany. (Note: During the early 14th century Brittany was a province of France, but while the dukes of Brittany were vassals of the French kings they governed the duchy as independent rulers.) Between 1372 and 1378 he saw naval service on three occasions, on the last under the command of de la Pole. He was certainly serving in Brittany in 1379 and 1380 when he drew out letters of protection, and the following year he travelled to Portugal under the Earl of Cambridge, by which time he had been knighted, possibly in 1377 by de la Pole. He returned to Portugal in 1385, and the following year he joined John of Gaunt's expedition to Spain.

== Later career ==
De la Pole was impeached in 1386, and the King, believing the gentry of East Anglia had betrayed the Earl with their lack of support, was reluctant to recruit among them; Braham was one of the few to be retained by the King in 1392 with an annuity of £20 (equivalent to £19,000 in 2025). Royal service continued to involve foreign service. In 1396, in preparation of his expedition to Ireland, and as was common for the period, he left his estates in the hands of feoffees. During this campaign Braham was a commander of Leinster under the captaincy of Stephen le Scrope, and his Irish service may have outlasted the King's reign; Richard was deposed by Henry Bolingbroke in 1399. However, he does not appear to have profited financially from his military career as others did, although he made connections with several influential courtiers such as Sir John Stanley, to whom he acted as a surety in 1393.

Following Richard's deposition, the new King, Henry IV, confirmed Braham's life annuity, although he did not call upon him for service until 1403, when he was despatched to South Wales to crush opposition to the new regime. although he received another substantial grant in 1408 of the manor of Docking, his annuity appears to have been cancelled by 1410. It was not renewed by Henry's successor and namesake, Henry V when he succeeded to the throne in 1412, and nor was Braham retained by the new King In 1417, Braham was elected Member of Parliament for Suffolk, which sat for one month between November and December that year; the King did not attend, being absent in France.

=== Death and reputation ===
Braham died, sine prole, in 1420, shortly after enfeoffing several trustees to hold his property. These included Robert Tey of Marks Tey, formerly of King Richard's Royal household, and they were responsible for ensuring that his widow kept hold of his estates for the term of her life. She died in 1431 leaving two daughters from a previous marriage. A recent biographer, Linda Woodger of the History of Parliament Trust, has described Braham overall as "never [a] particularly outstanding figure" in Suffolk society, and unlike many contemporaries of his class, he was never appointed to a royal commission, which, in view of his substantial royal annuity, Woodger calls "remarkable".

== Estates and wealth ==
Braham seems to have remained in financial difficulties for much of the rest of his life. In 1417, the year of his parliamentary election, his landed income was only £17 (equivalent to £0 in 2025) per annum. Braham's father had died a relatively wealthy man in 1375, but although Braham's sisters received 300 marks each in his will, (Note: A medieval English mark was a unit of currency equivalent to two-thirds of a pound.) but he inherited only his father's horse and armour. Braham received the manors of Brantham, Bergholt and Wenham, all in Suffolk. Woodger argues that it is unlikely that Braham became rich through soldiery; "or, if he did, he spent it too freely". As a result of his financial straits he was regularly summonsed over non-payment of debts, particularly to London drapers; again, Wodger writes that "it is clear that he was living beyond his means".
