= Katherine Barnardiston =

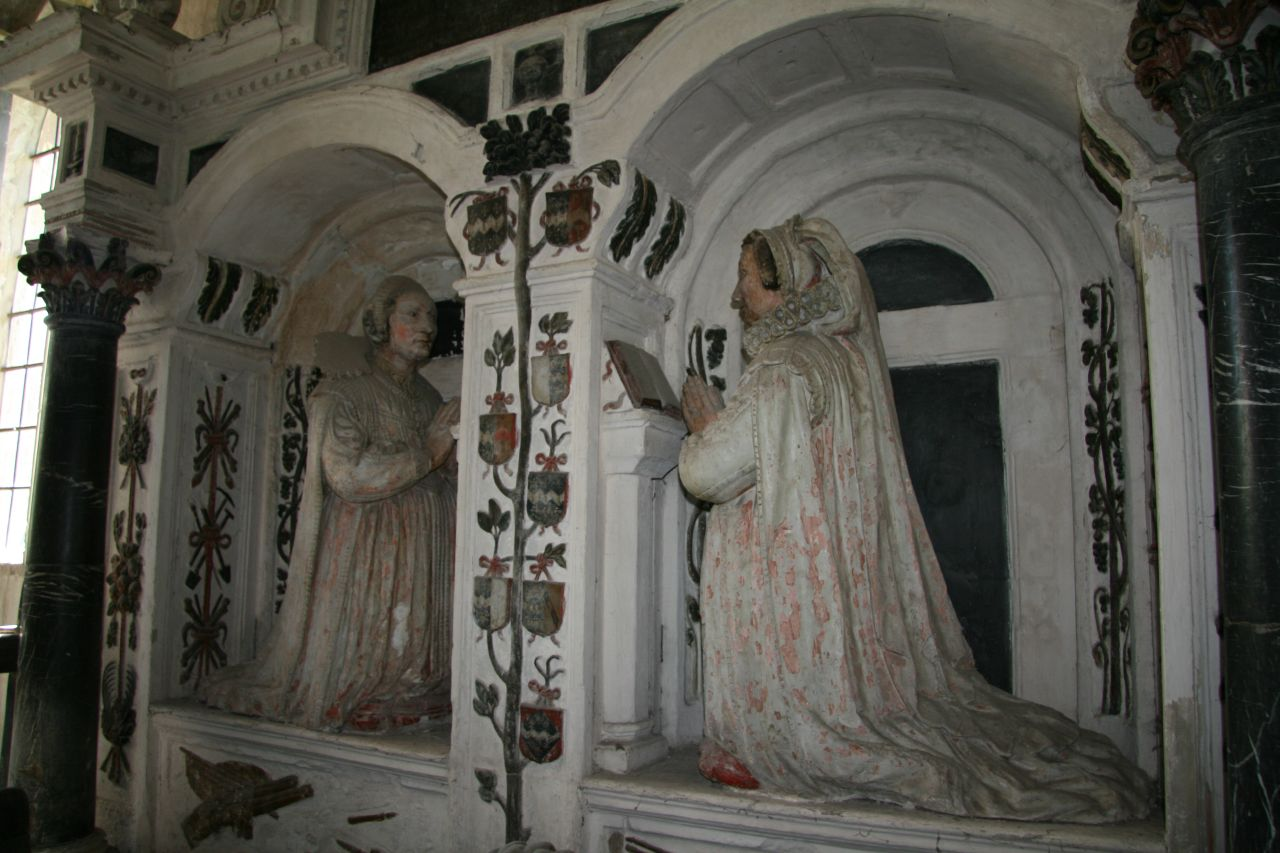
- in St Peter and St Paul's church Kedington
- Born: St Michael-le-Querne parish, London
- Died: 1633
- Known for: philanthropy

Katherine Barnardiston (died 1633) was an English patron of puritanism.

== Life ==
She was born in the centre of London in the parish of St Michael-le-Querne. She first married Bartholomew Soame and they lived in the parish of St Mary Colechurch. Soame died in 1596.

She then married Thomas the eldest child of Sir Thomas Barnardiston of Witham, Essex in 1599. She was his second wife and he had children from his first marriage including Nathaniel Barnardiston. In 1603 she became Lady Barnardiston when her husband was knighted and she kept this name and her place of residence when her husband died in 1610.

Two years after becoming a widow she married William Towse who was a lawyer.

When she died in 1633 she left a detailed will. Her husband had died the year before. One of the substantial donations was to St Catharine's College, Cambridge. She left the college £400 to fund three scholars who could not otherwise afford to study.

Her tomb is in the Church of St Peter and St Paul, in Kedington, which is surprising as she had requested to be buried in her home parish and is not clear if this happened.
