= John Heigham (MP) =

English politician

John Heigham (MP) (died 1626) was a leading Suffolk gentleman and Member of Parliament. He was Sheriff of Suffolk in 1577. He was MP for Sudbury in 1563 and for Ipswich in 1584, 1586 and 1604.

== Family ==
His father was Clement Higham, a lawyer and also a politician who was Speaker of the House of Commons in 1554, His mother was Anne Waldegrave daughter of George Waldegrave of Smallbridge. She was also the widow of Henry Bures of Acton. He married Anne Wright the daughter of Edmund Wright, with whom they had a son Clement Heigham (died 1634)
