= Robert Wingfield (politician, died 1596) =

Member of the Parliament of England

Robert Wingfield was a sixteenth century English landowner and puritan activist who served as member of parliament (MP) for Suffolk. He was the first son of Anthony Wingfield, who had also been MP for the constituency. He married first Cicely, daughter of Thomas Wentworth, 1st Baron Wentworth, and was father of Anthony Wingfield (1554–1605), MP for Orford; and secondly Bridget, daughter of Sir John Spring of Cockfield and Hitcham, Suffolk, and widow of Thomas Fleetwood of The Vache, Buckinghamshire, Master of the Mint.
