= Sir Robert Broke, 1st Baronet =

English Tory politician

Sir Robert Broke, 1st Baronet (23 November 1622 – 25 February 1694) was an English Tory politician.

== Biography ==
Broke was the eldest son of Sir Richard Broke of Nacton and Mary, daughter of Sir John Pakington. Broke was a descendant of Sir Richard Broke, Chief Baron of the Exchequer during the reign of Henry VIII. In 1637 he attended St Catharine's College, Cambridge, before travelling abroad between 1639 and 1642.

He is not recorded as playing any part in the English Civil War, but following the Stuart Restoration in 1660, Broke was appointed one of Suffolk's militia commissioners and a justice of the peace for the county. He stood for election in Ipswich in 1660, but was unsuccessful. On 21 May 1661, he was created a baronet, of Nacton in the Baronetage of England. He was active in local affairs in Suffolk, and in 1681 he presented a loyal address to Charles II from the people of Ipswich. The King, having had long experience of his "fidelity and zeal in his service", commissioned Broke to report on infractions of the charters and of the Corporation Act 1661 in Ipswich.

In February 1685, Broke presented a loyal address to James II following his accession. He was elected as a Member of Parliament for Suffolk in 1685 as a Tory. A moderately active Member, he was appointed to the committee of elections and privileges and that to consider the bill to prevent the export of wool. In April 1688, James II's agents in Suffolk reported that Broke was loyal to the king, but he was removed from municipal office in July and did not stand at the following general election; he took no further part in public life.

Parliament of England
Preceded by Sir William Spring, Bt; Sir Samuel Barnardiston, Bt	Member of Parliament for Suffolk; 1685–1687; With: Sir Henry North, Bt	Succeeded by Sir John Cordell, Bt; Sir John Rous, Bt
Baronetage of England
New creation	Baronet (of Nacton); 1661–1694	Extinct
