= William Bardwell (MP) =

English politician (c. 1361–1434)

Sir William Bardwell or Berdewell, (c. 1361–1434), of Bardwell, Suffolk and West Harling and Gasthorpe, Norfolk, was an English Member of Parliament (MP).

He was a Member of the Parliament of England for Suffolk in 1391, September 1397 and 1406.
