= Anthony Wingfield =

Member of the Parliament of England

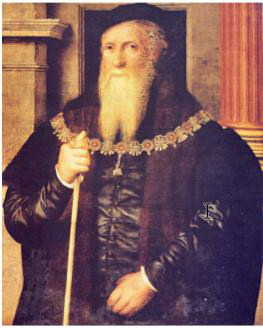
Portrait of Sir Anthony Wingfield, painting by William Scrots c. 1550

Sir Anthony Wingfield (born before 1488, died 15 August 1552) KG, MP, of Letheringham, Suffolk, was an English soldier, politician, courtier and member of parliament. He was the Lord Lieutenant of Suffolk from 1551 to 1552, and Vice-Chamberlain of the Household in the reign of Edward VI.

He married Elizabeth de Vere, daughter of Sir George de Vere and Margaret Stafford, sister of John de Vere, 14th Earl of Oxford. They both attended the Field of the Cloth of Gold in 1520.

In 1540 he arrested Thomas Cromwell and was Commissioner for dissolution of the monasteries in Suffolk.

== Wingfield of Letheringham ==
The Bovile family held the lordship of the manor of Letheringham, near Wickham Market in Suffolk, for many generations. Late in the 12th century they granted the tithes of Letheringham to the Prior and convent of St Peter and St Paul, Ipswich, who founded a cell of canons regular at Letheringham. The manor belonged in c.1307 to Sir Thomas Bovile (who died in that year). It descended to his nephew Sir William (died 1320), and in 1348 was passed in trust for William's great-granddaughter Margaret Bovile.

The manor passed to the Wingfield family when Margaret married Sir Thomas Wingfield (died 1378), and then, from father to son, to Sir John Wingfield (died 1389), to Sir Robert (died 1409), and to Sir Robert Wingfield the younger (died 1454), who married Elizabeth, daughter of Sir Robert Gowsell and Elizabeth Fitzalan, Duchess of Norfolk. (They were the parents of Elizabeth Wingfield, who married Sir William Brandon of Wangford (died 1491), and who became the grandmother of Charles Brandon, 1st Duke of Suffolk.) Sir Robert and Dame Elizabeth Wingfield's son, Sir John Wingfield (died 1481), married Elizabeth FitzLewis (a daughter of Sir Lewis John by Anne Montagu), and these were the grandparents of Anthony Wingfield.

Anthony Wingfield was born before 1488, the first of three sons of Sir John Wingfield (died 1509) of Letheringham and Anne, daughter of John Tuchet, 6th Lord Audley. There were also three daughters. Sir John was High Sheriff of Norfolk and Suffolk in 1483. He fought against Richard III at Bosworth Field in 1485, and following the accession of Henry VII he was appointed Steward of the lands of the Honour of Richmond in Norfolk. He served again as sheriff in 1487.

== Biographical details ==
=== Military career ===
By 1509, when Sir John died, Anthony had been appointed Esquire of the body, and he attended the funeral of Henry VII. Wingfield first saw active service in the first war of Henry VIII's reign, fighting at the siege of Tournai in 1513. He was knighted in 1513 for his part in the capture of Tournai. He was appointed High Sheriff of Norfolk and Suffolk for 1515–16. He attended the Field of the Cloth of Gold in 1520, and served in the 1523 French campaign of Charles Brandon, the Duke of Suffolk; and lastly in the 1544 capture of Boulogne.

=== Parliamentary career ===
Wingfield served as the Member for Parliament for Suffolk (1529, 1536, 1539, and probably 1542). Whilst serving in Boulogne, he was returned as MP for Horsham in 1545; and finally served again for Suffolk in 1547.

=== Political and court career ===
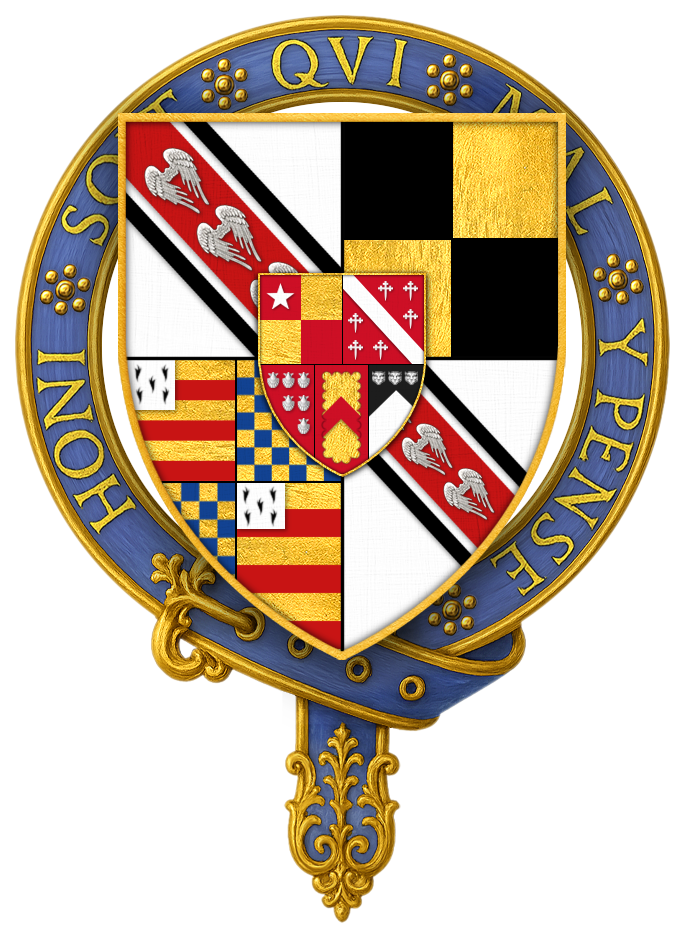
Arms of Sir Anthony Wingfield, KG

By 1539 Wingfield was a member of the Privy Council and administrator in Henry VIII's royal household. Wingfield was made a Knight of the Garter on St George's Day 1541 (12th stall, Sovereign's side). When the King died in 1547, Wingfield served as an assistant executor; was bequeathed £200; and led the guard at the funeral procession. Wingfield remained a member of the council during the protectorate of Somerset. However, after the fall of the Protectorate in October 1549, it was Wingfield whom the Council sent to Windsor to arrest Somerset, and to bring him to the Tower.

He was appointed to the post of Chamberlain of the Exchequer in 1550, holding it until his death two years later.

On 28 August 1551, Sir Anthony, along with the then Lord Chancellor Richard Rich and Sir William Petre went to Copt Hall in Essex to order Princess Mary Tudor and her household to stop hearing the Catholic Mass. Wingfield was sent to replace Mary's Comptroller Robert Rochester, who was removed by Edward's Council for refusing to order Mary to cease hearing Mass.

=== Death, burial and testament ===
Wingfield died on 15 August 1552 in Bethnal Green, at Sir John Gates's house, and his funerals took place on 21 August at Stepney. His body was borne in a grand heraldic procession, with singing clerks, and with his armour and insignia displayed, over Mile End, where the vicar of Shoreditch preached at the communion, and a feast was afterwards held. His will, naming his wife and his son Robert his executors, was proved in April 1553 by Robert alone: his widow Dame Elizabeth specifically renounced her executorship. Dame Elizabeth made her own will on 28 July 1557 and it was proved on 13 November 1559.

== Marriage and issue ==
Wingfield married, by 1520, Elizabeth de Vere, daughter of Sir George de Vere and sister of John de Vere, 14th Earl of Oxford. She attended the Field of the Cloth of Gold as "Lady Wingfield" in 1520. They had eight sons and seven daughters:

- John Wingfield, who is said to have married Dorothy Fitzherbert, and died without issue.
- Francis Wingfield, who died without issue.
- Sir Robert Wingfield, who married first Cicely, daughter of Thomas Wentworth, 1st Baron Wentworth, and was father of Anthony Wingfield (1554–1605), MP for Orford; and secondly Bridget, daughter of Sir John Spring of Cockfield and Hitcham, Suffolk, and widow of Thomas Fleetwood of The Vache, Buckinghamshire, Master of the Mint.
- Charles Wingfield, esquire, who married Elizabeth Rich, the daughter of Robert Rich of South Weald, Essex.
- Richard Wingfield, esquire, of Crowfield and Wantisden, Suffolk, who married first Mary, daughter of John Hardwick, Esq. (d. 29 January 1528) and Elizabeth Leeke (and sister of Bess of Hardwick); and secondly Joan Clerke, widow of John Harbottle, esquire.
- George Wingfield, who died without issue.
- Anthony Wingfield (d.1593), esquire, who married first Katherine (died 1558), daughter of Sir Thomas Blennerhassett of Frenze, Norfolk, and widow of John Gosnold (d.1554) of Shrubland Park in Barham, Suffolk; secondly Jane (died 1562), daughter of Edmund Purpett of the manor of Waldingfield; and third Elizabeth, daughter of Ralph Leeche of Chatsworth, Derbyshire. Wingfield was Black Rod from 1591 until his death.
- Henry Wingfield, who is said to have married Dorothy Bacon, and to have been living in 1557.
- Elizabeth Wingfield, who died young.
- Elizabeth Wingfield (again), who married William Naunton (d. 7 June 1553), esquire, of Alderton, Suffolk, grandfather of Sir Robert Naunton.
- Mary Wingfield, who married first Arthur Rush of Chapmans in Sudbourne, Suffolk; secondly Anthony Roke; and third, Thomas Darcy.
- Margaret Wingfield, who died young.
- Jane Wingfield.
- Anne Wingfield, who died without issue.
- Margaret Wingfield (again), who married first Francis Soone of Wantisden, Suffolk, and secondly a husband surnamed Audley.

Wingfield was survived by five of his sons, Sir Robert, Charles, Anthony, Henry and Richard.

Political offices
Preceded by Sir William Kingston	Vice-Chamberlain of the Household; 1539–1550	Succeeded by Sir Thomas Darcy
