= Skinner's Case =

Skinner v East India Company
- A common flag of the Honourable East India Company until 1707, when union flag incorporated
- Court: House of Lords then the House of Commons, then the House of Lords
- Full case name: Thomas Skinner v East India Company (and House of Commons personal judgment against Skinner; and House of Lords personal judgment against chairman of the East India Company)
- Decided: 1668 (1669 as to related judgments)

Case history
- Prior action: None
- Subsequent action: None

Case opinions
- of King Charles II of Great Britain: judgments of both Houses to be erased, proceedings ended.

Skinner's Case became a constitutionally important dispute between the House of Lords and the House of Commons over the question of any original jurisdiction of the former house in civil suits (whether a possible court of first instance). Through royal intervention, it was determined and became custom that such jurisdiction was to be avoided.

== Facts ==
In 1668, a London-based merchant, Thomas Skinner, presented a petition to Charles II asserting that he could not obtain any redress against the East India Company, which, he asserted, had injured his property, his free trading base in the Indian Ocean set up before the latter had an official monopoly.

The case was referred to the House of Lords, and Skinner obtained a verdict for £5,000 damages (equivalent to £1,000,000 in 2025). The company complained to the House of Commons which declared that the proceedings in the other House were illegal. The Lords defended their action, and after two conferences between the Houses had produced no result the Commons ordered Skinner to be put in prison on a charge of breach of privilege; to this the Lords replied by fining and imprisoning Sir Samuel Barnardiston, the chairman of the company.

Then for about a year the dispute slumbered, but it was renewed in 1669, when Charles II advised the two Houses to stop all proceedings and to erase all mention of the case from their records. This was done and since this time the House of Lords has tacitly abandoned all claim to original jurisdiction (be a court of first instance) in civil suits.

== Authorities ==
- Lord Holles, The Grand Question concerning the Judicature of the House of Peers (1669)
- Thomas Pitt Taswell-Langmead, English Constitutional History (1905)
- Luke Owen Pike, Constitutional History of the House of Lords (1894)
- Henry Hallam, Constitutional History, vol. iii. (1885).

== See also ==
- Judicial Committee of the House of Lords
- Earl of Oxford's Case, in which the monarch intervened, helping to establish whether conflicting matters of equity or of those of the common law prevail in English Law.
