= Sir Henry North, 1st Baronet =

English politician

Sir Henry North, 1st Baronet (c 1609 – 29 August 1671) was an English politician who sat in the House of Commons variously between 1656 and 1671.

North was the son of Sir Roger North of Mildenhall and his wife, Elizabeth Gilbert, daughter of Sir John Gilbert of Great Finborow, Suffolk.

In 1656, North was elected Member of Parliament for Suffolk in the Second Protectorate Parliament.

In 1660, North was elected MP for Suffolk in the Convention Parliament. He was created baronet of Mildenhall on 14 June 1660. He was re-elected MP for Suffolk in 1661 for the Cavalier Parliament and sat until his death in 1671. In 1664 he was Colonel of a foot regiment of the Suffolk Militia.

North married Sarah Rayney, daughter of John Rayney of West Malling, Kent. He was succeeded by his son Henry. His daughter Peregrina married William Hanmer and was the mother of Sir Thomas Hanmer, 4th Baronet, Speaker of the House of Commons.

Parliament of England
Preceded by Sir William Spring; Thomas Barnardiston; Sir Thomas Bedingfield; William Blois John Gurdon; William Gibbes; John Brandling; Alexander Bence; John Sicklemore Thomas Bacon	Member of Parliament for Suffolk; 1656; With: Thomas Barnardiston; Sir Henry Felton; Edmund Harvey; Edward Le Neve; John Sicklemore; William Blois; William Gibbes; Robert Brewster; Daniel Wall	Succeeded by Samuel Barnardiston; Sir Henry Felton
Baronetage of England
New creation	Baronet (of Mildenhall); 1660–1671	Succeeded by Henry North
