= Sir Thomas Barnardiston, 2nd Baronet =

English politician

Sir Thomas Barnardiston, 2nd Baronet (c. 1646 – 7 October 1698) was an English nobleman and Whig politician.

== Life ==
Barnardiston was the son of Sir Thomas Barnardiston, 1st Baronet and Anne Airmine, daughter of Sir William Airmine, 1st Baronet. He was admitted to Gray's Inn on 19 June 1667. He succeeded to his father's title on 4 October 1669.

Between 1685 and 1690 Barnardiston served as the Member of Parliament for Great Grimsby in the House of Commons of England. From 1690 to 1698 he was the MP for Sudbury. In 1692 he was Colonel of the Yellow Regiment of Suffolk Militia.

He married Elizabeth King, the daughter of Sir Robert King of Boyle Abbey, Roscommon, in the Kingdom of Ireland and his second wife Sophia Zouch, daughter of Sir Edward Zouch and Dorothea Silking, the Danish chamberer to Queen Anne of Denmark. They had four sons, three of whom later inherited their father's baronetcy.

Parliament of England
Preceded by George Pelham; William Broxholme	Member of Parliament for Great Grimsby; 1685–1690; With: Sir Edward Ayscough	Succeeded by John Chaplin
Preceded by John Robinson; Philip Gurdon	Member of Parliament for Sudbury; 1690–1698; With: Samuel Kekewich	Succeeded by John Gurdon
Baronetage of England
Preceded by Sir Thomas Barnardiston	Baronet (of Ketton); 1669–1698	Succeeded by Sir Thomas Barnardiston
