= Thomas Chaplin (MP for Bury St Edmunds) =

English draper and politician (1591–1672)

Thomas Chaplin (1591–1672) was an English draper and politician who sat in the House of Commons in 1659 and 1660.

Chaplin was the son of William Chaplin of Semer, Suffolk by his first wife Agnes and was baptised on 21 October 1591. His father was bailiff of Semer manor. Chaplin set himself up as a linen-draper in Bury St. Edmunds. He was a Presbyterian and supported the parliamentary cause in the English Civil War. He was an alderman of Bury St. Edmunds by 1643 and remained until 1662.

In 1643 he was commissioner for execution of ordinances for Bury and commissioner for the Eastern association. He was commissioner for assessment for Bury from 1645 to 1652. In 1648 he was commissioner for militia for Suffolk. He was commissioner for assessment for Suffolk from 1649 to 1652. He was a J.P. for Suffolk from 1650 to March 1660 and was a member of the high court of justice in 1650. From 1655 to 1656 he was commissioner for security and in 1657 he was commissioner for assessment for Suffolk and Bury 1657.

In 1659, Chaplin was commissioner for militia for Suffolk and was elected Member of Parliament for Bury St Edmunds in the Third Protectorate Parliament. He was commissioner for assessment for Suffolk in January 1660 and commissioner for militia for Bury in March 1660. In April 1660 he was re-elected MP for Bury St Edmunds for the Convention Parliament when he was involved in a double return. He was allowed to take his seat and then unseated.

Chaplin died between 24 April 1672 when he made his will and 25 November 1672 when it was proved.

Chaplin married Elizabeth Ignis, daughter of Robert Ignis alias Hynes, a goldsmith of Bury St. Edmunds. He had two sons and two daughters.

Parliament of England
Preceded by John Clarke; Samuel Moody	Member of Parliament for Bury St Edmunds; 1659; With: John Clarke	Succeeded by Sir Thomas Barnardiston, 1st Baronet
