= William Argentine =

Sir William Argentine (c. 1350-1419), of Halesworth, Suffolk, and Great Wymondley, Hertfordshire, was an English Member of Parliament (MP).

He was a Member of the Parliament of England for Suffolk in 1393, 1395, and 1399.

He was connected to several other MPs. Argentine was the illegitimate son of John Argentine. His first wife was Isabel, a daughter of Sir William Kerdiston and they had two sons. His second wife was Joan, a daughter and coheiress of John Hadley. Joan was the widow of Sir William Pecche. Argentine's third wife was Margery, a daughter of Ralph Parles, MP for Northamptonshire, and the widow of John Hervey, MP for Bedfordshire.
