= John Strange (MP for Suffolk and Norfolk) =

English politician (c. 1347-1417)

Sir John Strange (c. 1347-1417), of Hunstanton, Norfolk, and Thorpe Morieux, Suffolk, was an English Member of Parliament (MP).

He was a Member of the Parliament of England for Suffolk in January 1404, October 1404 and 1406; and for Norfolk in February 1388, September 1388.
