= William Burgate =

Sir William Burgate (died 1409), of Burgate, Suffolk, was an English Member of Parliament (MP).

He was a Member of the Parliament of England for Suffolk February 1388, September 1388, November 1390 and 1395.
