= William Wingfield (14th century MP) =

English Member of Parliament (c. 1326 – 1398)

Sir William Wingfield (c. 1326 – 1398), of Cotton and Dennington, Suffolk, was an English Member of Parliament (MP).

He was a Member of the Parliament of England for Suffolk in 1376, 1378, 1381, May 1382, October 1382, February 1383, October 1383, 1386, January 1390 and November 1390.
