= Sir Henry Felton, 2nd Baronet =

English politician

Sir Henry Felton, 2nd Baronet (27 July 1619 – 20 October 1690) was an English politician who sat in the House of Commons between 1656 and 1679.

== Biography ==
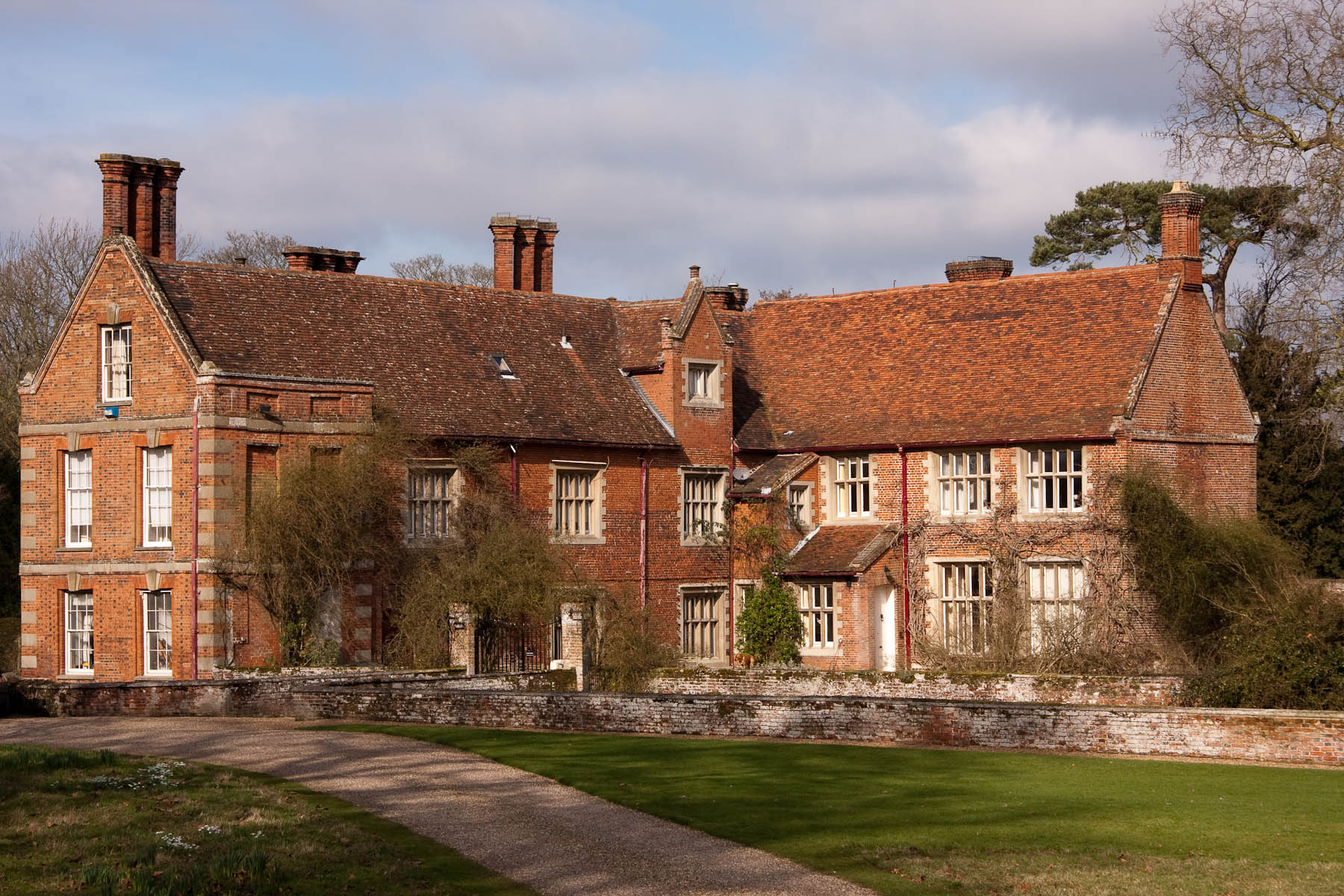
Playford Hall

Felton was the son of Henry Felton, 1st Baronet of Playford, Suffolk and his wife Dorothy Bacon, the daughter of Nicholas Bacon. He inherited the baronetcy on the death of his father in 1624.

In 1656, Felton was elected Member of Parliament for Suffolk in the Second Protectorate Parliament. He was re-elected MP for Suffolk in 1659 to the Third Protectorate Parliament.

In 1660, Felton was elected MP for Suffolk in the Convention Parliament. He was re-elected in 1661 for the Cavalier Parliament and sat until 1679.

Felton died shortly before his burial on 20 October 1690 at Playford.

== Family ==
Felton married Susannah Tollemache, daughter of Sir Lionel Tollemache, 2nd Baronet. They had five surviving sons and three daughters, including Sir Adam Felton, 3rd Baronet, Thomas Felton, 4th Baronet and Compton Felton, 5th Baronet.

Parliament of England
Preceded by Sir William Spring Sir Thomas Barnardiston; Sir Thomas Bedingfield; William Bloys; John Gurdon; William Gibbes; John Brandling; Alexander Bence; John Sicklemore Thomas Bacon	Member of Parliament for Suffolk; 1656–1659; With: Sir Thomas Barnardiston 1656–1659; Sir Henry North 1656; Edmund Harvey 1656; Edward Le Neve 1656; John Sicklemore 1656; William Bloys 1656; William Gibbes 1656; Robert Brewster 1656; Daniel Wall 1656	Succeeded by Not represented in restored Rump
Baronetage of England
Preceded by Henry Felton	Baronet (of Playford); 1624–1690	Succeeded by Adam Felton
