= John Spencer (courtier) =

Member of the Parliament of England

John Spencer (died 1417) was an English courtier and Member of Parliament.

He was the son of William Spencer of Burton Pidsea, Yorkshire, and entered the royal household around 1390 as a wardrobe clerk. He was receiver-general to the Prince of Wales, c. 1402 to c. 1403, and then was controller of his household until 1413. The Prince then became king as Henry V, and Spencer was promoted to Cofferer of the Household from March to October, 1413, and to Keeper of the Great Wardrobe from 1 Oct. 1413, a position he held until his death.

Spencer twice represented Suffolk in Parliament (in 1411 and 1413) as a knight of the shire and was appointed to act as High Sheriff of Norfolk and Suffolk from February to November, 1416.

He married Katherine, the daughter and coheiress of Sir William Burgate of Burgate and the widow of Robert Stonham of Stonham Aspall, Suffolk. They had no children.
