= Andrew Butler (MP) =

Sir Andrew Butler (? - 1430), of Great Waldingfield, Suffolk, was an English Member of Parliament (MP).

He was a Member of the Parliament of England for Suffolk in October 1404, 1410 and May 1421.
