= Sir Henry North, 2nd Baronet =

Sir Henry North, 2nd Baronet (c.1635 – 5 July 1695) was an English Tory politician.

North was the son of Sir Henry North, 1st Baronet and Sarah Rayney. He was educated at King Edward VI School, Bury St Edmunds and St John's College, Cambridge. On 29 August 1671 he succeeded to his father's baronetcy. Between 1678 and 1688, North was a Deputy Lieutenant of Suffolk. In 1685, he was elected as a Member of Parliament for Suffolk, holding the seat in 1687. He did not seek re-election in 1689 following the Glorious Revolution, and died in 1695 at which point his title became extinct.

Parliament of England
Preceded by Sir William Spring, Bt; Sir Samuel Barnardiston, Bt	Member of Parliament for Suffolk; 1685–1687; With: Sir Robert Broke, Bt	Succeeded by Sir John Cordell, Bt; Sir John Rous, Bt
Baronetage of England
Preceded by Henry North	Baronet (of Mildenhall); 1671–1695	Extinct
