= Robert Bukton =

Robert Bukton (? - 1408), of Oakley and Brome, Suffolk, was an English Member of Parliament (MP).

He was a Member of the Parliament of England for Suffolk in 1394, January 1397, September 1397 and 1401.
