= Joseph Brand (biologist) =

American biologist

Joseph G. Brand
- Education: University of Rochester
- Known for: Amiloride as a sodium inhibitor, nonfunctioning cat taste receptor
- Scientific career
- Fields: Biology, Genetics
- Workplaces: Monell Chemical Senses Center
- Doctoral advisor: Taft Toribara
- Doctoral students: Xia Li

Joseph G. Brand is a biologist currently at Monell Chemical Senses Center. In 1985, Brand discovered that the substance amiloride is an inhibitor of sodium when present in the epithelia of rats. Subsequently in 2005, Brand and Xia Li discovered that cats did not have a functioning sweet taste receptor, because it was made obsolete by evolution.

== See also ==
- Amiloride
