= William Elmham =

Sir William Elmham (c. 1336 – 1403), of Westhorpe, Suffolk, and Fring, Norfolk, was an English Member of Parliament (MP).

He was a Member of the Parliament of England for Suffolk in 1393, 1394, and January 1397.
