= Suffolk (UK Parliament constituency) =

Parliamentary constituency in the United Kingdom, 1801–1832

- Former county constituency for the House of Commons

1290–1832
- Seats: two
- Replaced by: East Suffolk and West Suffolk

Suffolk was a County constituency of the House of Commons of the Parliament of England from 1290 to 1707, then of the Parliament of Great Britain from 1707 to 1800 and of the Parliament of the United Kingdom from 1801, which returned two Members of Parliament (MPs) to the House of Commons until 1832, when it was split into two divisions.

== History ==
=== Boundaries and franchise ===
The constituency consisted of the historic county of Suffolk. (Although Suffolk contained a number of boroughs, each of which elected two MPs in its own right, these were not excluded from the county constituency, and owning property within the borough could confer a vote at the county election.)

As in other county constituencies the franchise between 1430 and 1832 was defined by the Forty Shilling Freeholder Act, which gave the right to vote to every man who possessed freehold property within the county valued at £2 or more per year for the purposes of land tax; it was not necessary for the freeholder to occupy his land, nor even in later years to be resident in the county at all.

Except during the period of the Commonwealth, Suffolk had two MPs elected by the bloc vote method, under which each voter had two votes. (In the nominated Barebones Parliament, five members represented Suffolk; in the First and Second Parliaments of Oliver Cromwell's Protectorate, there was a general redistribution of seats and Suffolk elected ten members. The traditional arrangements were restored from 1659.)

=== Political character ===
Elections were held at a single polling place, Ipswich, and voters from the rest of the county had to travel to the county town to exercise their franchise, which made elections almost prohibitively expensive in a county as big as Suffolk. The inconvenience of holding the elections in Ipswich, situated in one corner of the county, is emphasised by the fact that for almost all other county purposes, including the Assizes, Suffolk was divided into two sections with proceedings held at Bury St Edmunds as well as Ipswich; the arrangement must certainly have worked to the benefit of candidates whose voting strength was in East Suffolk rather than West Suffolk. It was normal for voters to expect the candidates for whom they voted to meet their expenses in travelling to the poll, and to "entertain" them – in other words provide free food and alcoholic drink – when they arrived.

Peter Jupp includes in his collection of documents relating to elections round the turn of the 19th century a contemporary account of the Suffolk election of 1790, one of the rare contested elections, which well illustrates the arrangements for treating the voters on such occasions. A committee set up to support the candidacies of Sir Charles Bunbury and Sir John Rous, "for the better regulating of the expense of maintaining the freeholders upon the days of election" issued printed tickets with the names of public houses upon them, entitling the bearer to a fixed amount of provision and maintenance – black tickets worth five shillings for the day, and red tickets worth seven shillings and sixpence for a man and horse for the night. After the election, the innkeepers presented their bills for providing this hospitality, which amounted to £3,500 for a two-day election; and the committee, much dissatisfied by the scale of these charges, declined to pay in full so that several of the publicans afterwards sued the two candidates.

Partly as a result of the expense, contested elections were rare in Suffolk (there were contests at four of the nine general elections between 1701 and 1727, but at only three of the twenty remaining before the Reform Act in 1832), and even when they took place were often only token contests. There was no dominant aristocratic interest in Suffolk, though it would probably have been impossible to defy the county's wealthier peers (such as the Duke of Grafton, Marquess Cornwallis, and the Earl of Bristol) had they stood together, since no competing interest could hope to match them in an out-and-out spending contest.

In practice, the choice of members usually lay with the country squires, with matters generally settled more or less amicably by a test of strength at the county meeting with no need for the expense of a formal poll; when there was a contest, in 1784 (when three candidates stood for two seats), the weakest of the three quickly withdrew when it was clear after the first day of voting that he could not win. Nevertheless, the freeholders were not necessarily entirely deferential and manipulable by the gentry: Cannon cites the work of Professor J H Plumb, who showed in his study of Suffolk pollbooks from the reign of Queen Anne that the voters could act independently in a seriously contested election, while their humiliating rejection of their long-standing MP Thomas Sherlock Gooch in favour of a Reform Bill supporter at the tumultuous election of 1830 demonstrates similar intractability more than a century later.

=== Abolition ===
By the time of the Great Reform Act in 1832, Suffolk had a population of approximately 300,000, It was assumed to have around 5,000 qualified voters, but since no full-blooded contest had taken place in living memory this could only be an estimate. (Before the Reform Act there was no permanent register of voters). The Great Reform Act raised Suffolk's entitlement from two to four county MPs, while abolishing three of its seven boroughs. The single county constituency was abolished, being split into two divisions, East Suffolk and West Suffolk. At the first election after Reform, with a somewhat extended franchise, the electorates of these two new divisions totalled about 7,500.

== Members of Parliament ==
=== 1290–1640 ===
Parliament	First member	Second member		
1376	Sir Richard Waldegrave			
1377 (Oct)	Sir Richard Waldegrave			
1378	Sir Richard Waldegrave			
1381	Sir Richard Waldegrave			
1382 (May)	Sir Richard Waldegrave			
1382 (Oct)	Sir Richard Waldegrave			
1383 (Feb)	Sir Richard Waldegrave			
1383 (Oct)	Sir Richard Waldegrave			
1386	Sir Richard Waldegrave	Sir William Wingfield		
1388 (Feb)	Sir Richard Waldegrave	Sir William Burgate		
1388 (Sep)	Sir Richard Waldegrave	Sir William Burgate		
1390 (Jan)	Sir Richard Waldegrave	Sir William Wingfield		
1390 (Nov)	Sir William Wingfield	Sir William Burgate		
1391	Sir Roger Drury	Sir William Bardwell		
1393	Sir William Elmham	Sir William Argentine		
1394	Sir William Elmham	Robert Bukton		
1395	Sir William Argentine	Sir William Burgate		
1397 (Jan)	Sir William Elmham	Robert Bukton		
1397 (Sep)	Sir William Bardwell	Robert Bukton		
1399	Sir William Argentine	Sir John Heveningham		
1401	Sir Roger Drury	Robert Bukton		
1402	Ralph Ramsey	Gilbert Debenham		
1404 (Jan)	Sir John Strange	Sir John Ingoldisthorpe		
1404 (Oct)	Sir Andrew Butler	Sir John Strange		
1406	Sir John Strange	Sir William Bardwell		
1407	Sir Roger Drury	John Lancaster		
1410	Sir Andrew Butler	John Lancaster		
1411	John Spencer	John Lancaster		
1413 (Feb)				
1413 (May)	John Spencer	John Lancaster		
1414 (Apr)	Sir William Phelip	Sir Robert Corbet		
1414 (Nov)	Sir William Phelip	Sir Robert Corbet		
1415				
1416 (Mar)				
1416 (Oct)				
1417	Sir John Braham	William Rookwood		
1419	William Hanningfield	William Rookwood		
1420	Richard Sterysacre	Thomas Hethe		
1421 (May)	Sir Andrew Butler	William Rookwood		
1421 (Dec)	James Andrew	William Rookwood		
1422	John Wodehouse	John Howard		
1427	Sir Robert Wingfield	Gilbert Debenham		
1431	Sir Robert Wingfield	Sir Thomas Tuddenham		
1432-1436	Sir Robert Wingfield	Gilbert Debenham		
1444	Gilbert Debenham			
1449	Gilbert Debenham	Nov 1450	Sir Roger Chamberlain	Sir Edmund Mulsho
1450-1	Gilbert Debenham	1491	Sir Robert Drury	
1495	Sir Robert Drury			
1510	Sir Robert Drury	?		
1512	?			
1515	?			
1523	?			
1529	Sir Anthony Wingfield	Sir Thomas Wentworth I		
1536	Sir Anthony Wingfield			
1539	Sir Anthony Wingfield	Sir Arthur Hopton		
1542	?Sir Anthony Wingfield	Sir Arthur Hopton		
1545	Sir William Waldegrave	Anthony Rous		
1547	Sir Anthony Wingfield	Thomas Wentworth, ennobled and repl. by 23 Jan 1552 by Sir Thomas Cornwallis		
1553 (Mar)	Sir William Drury	Sir Henry Bedingfield		
1553 (Oct)	Sir William Drury	Sir Henry Jerningham		
1554 (Apr)	Sir William Drury	Sir Henry Jerningham		
1554 (Nov)	Sir William Drury	Sir Henry Jerningham		
1555	Sir Henry Jerningham	Sir William Drury		
1558	Thomas Cornwallis	Sir William Cordell		
1558–9	Sir Owen Hopton	William Cavendish I		
1562–3	Sir Robert Wingfield	William Waldegrave		
1571 (Mar)	Sir Owen Hopton	Thomas Seckford		
1572	(Sir) Nicholas Bacon	Sir Robert Wingfield		
1584	Sir William Drury	Sir Robert Jermyn		
1586 (Oct)	Sir Robert Jermyn	Sir John Heigham		
1588–9	Anthony Wingfield	Arthur Hopton		
1593	Edward Bacon	Sir Clement Heigham		
1597 (Sep)	Sir Thomas Waldegrave	Henry Warner		
1601	Sir Henry Glemham	Calthrop Parker		
1604–1611	Sir John Heigham	Sir Robert Drury		
1614	Sir Thomas Jermyn	Sir Robert Gardiner		
1621–1622	Robert Crane	Thomas Clench		
1624	Sir William Spring of Pakenham	Sir Roger North		
1625	Sir Edmund Bacon, 2nd Baronet	Thomas Cornwallis		
1626	Robert Naunton	Sir Robert Crane		
1628	Sir William Spring of Pakenham	Sir Nathaniel Barnardiston		
1629–1640	No Parliament convened			

=== 1640–1832 ===
Year	First member	First party	Second member	Second party
April 1640	Sir Nathaniel Barnardiston	Parliamentarian	Sir Philip Parker	Parliamentarian
December 1648	Barnardiston not recorded as sitting after Pride's Purge		Parker excluded in Pride's Purge – seat vacant	
1653	Barebones Parliament (5 nominated members): Jacob Caley, Francis Brewster, Robert Dunkon, John Clarke, Edward Plumstead			
1654	First Protectorate Parliament (10 members): Sir William Spring, Bt, Sir Thomas Barnardiston, Bt, Sir Thomas Bedingfield, William Bloys, John Gurdon, William Gibbes, John Brandling, Alexander Bence, John Sicklemore, Thomas Bacon			
1656	Second Protectorate Parliament (10 members): Sir Thomas Barnardiston, Bt, Henry Felton, Henry North, Edmund Harvey, Edward Le Neve, John Sicklemore, William Bloys, William Gibbes, Robert Brewster, Daniel Wall			
January 1659	Henry Felton		Sir Thomas Barnardiston, Bt	
May 1659	Not represented in the restored Rump			
April 1660	Henry Felton		Sir Henry North, Bt	
1673	Henry Felton		Sir Samuel Barnardiston, Bt	Whig
February 1679	Sir Gervase Elwes, Bt	Whig	Sir Samuel Barnardiston, Bt	Whig
September 1679	Sir William Spring, Bt	Whig	Sir Samuel Barnardiston, Bt	Whig
1685	Sir Robert Broke, Bt	Tory	Sir Henry North, Bt	Tory
1689	Sir John Cordell, Bt	Tory	Sir John Rous, Bt	Tory
1690	Sir Gervase Elwes, Bt	Whig	Sir Samuel Barnardiston, Bt	Whig
1698	The Earl of Dysart	Tory	Sir Samuel Barnardiston, Bt	Whig
1702	The Earl of Dysart	Tory	Sir Dudley Cullum, Bt	Whig
1705	The Earl of Dysart	Tory	Sir Robert Davers, Bt	Tory
1707	Leicester Martin	Tory	Sir Robert Davers, Bt	Tory
1708	Sir Thomas Hanmer, Bt	Tory	Sir Robert Davers, Bt	Tory
1722	Sir Thomas Hanmer, Bt	Tory	Sir William Barker, Bt	Tory
1727	Sir Jermyn Davers, Bt	Tory	Sir William Barker, Bt	Tory
1732	Sir Jermyn Davers, Bt	Tory	Sir Robert Kemp, Bt	Tory
1735	Sir Jermyn Davers, Bt	Tory	Sir Cordell Firebrace, Bt	Tory
1743	John Affleck	Tory	Sir Cordell Firebrace, Bt	Tory
1759	John Affleck	Tory	Rowland Holt	Tory
1761	Sir Charles Bunbury, Bt		Rowland Holt	Tory
1768	Sir Charles Bunbury, Bt		Sir John Rous, Bt	
1771	Sir Charles Bunbury, Bt		Rowland Holt	Tory
1780	Sir Charles Bunbury, Bt		Sir John Rous, Bt	
1784	Joshua Grigby		Sir John Rous, Bt	
1790	Sir Charles Bunbury, Bt		Sir John Rous, Bt	
1796	Sir Charles Bunbury, Bt		Viscount Brome	Tory
1806	Sir Charles Bunbury, Bt		Thomas Gooch	Tory
1812	Sir William Rowley, Bt		Thomas Gooch	Tory
1830	Sir Henry Bunbury, Bt		Charles Tyrell	Whig
1832	Suffolk split into two divisions: see East Suffolk and West Suffolk			
