= Barnardiston family =

The Barnardistons were English landholders of the medieval period, with holdings in Barnardiston, Suffolk and Great Coates, Lincolnshire.

== The Barnardiston family ==
The Barnardiston were 'one of the most ancient families of the equestrian order' in Great Britain, with 'a direct line of twenty-seven generations at least'. It is stated that the family held estates around Barnardiston, Suffolk (sometimes written or pronounced "Barnston") from the time of William the Conqueror.

The two principal seats of the Barnardistons, in Suffolk and Lincolnshire, appear to have been brought together through the marriage of Thomas de Barnardiston to Margery Wilegby (i.e. Willoughby). By the year 1312, the fifth year of King Edward II, Margery was a widow and had sons John and Thomas de Barnardiston: Almack suggests that John was living in 1327 when he was assessed for the manor of Great Cotes, but afterwards died and was succeeded as heir by his brother Thomas.

=== In Barnardiston and Kedington ===
Main Barnardiston §Manor

The manor of Barnardiston or Barnston was granted, with the advowson, in 1312 by Alexander de Walpole, son and heir of Walter de Barnardiston, to the clerk John de Sandale. This was, according to Walter Copinger (following Richard Almack) a grant to Margary Wylghby and her son Thomas de Barnardiston. These authorities explain that this Thomas Barnardiston was the son of Thomas and Margery, and (according to Almack) the grandson of Geoffrey and great-grandson of William de Barnardiston. Alexander de Walpole was the grandson of William's brother Simon de Barnardiston. William and Simon were the sons of one A. de Barnardiston who flourished in the time of King Richard I (1189–1199). It is therefore likely that the manor of Barnardiston was a hereditament in the Barnardiston family from no later than the twelfth century, and that the transaction of 1312 was a settlement in respect of the de Barnardiston patrilineal inheritance.

The adjacent manor of Kedington or Ketton in Suffolk, Risbridge Hundred, had by 1312 descended to Thomas de Barnardiston (husband of Margery) apparently in the right of his mother, believed to have been a member of the Newmarch (or De Novo Mercato) family. Kedington was vested in Adam de Novo Mercato in the time of King Richard I. Amicia, the widow of John de Novo Mercato, held Kedington for life after the death of her husband, and in 1312 Roger de Newmarch granted the manor and advowson of Kedington to the clerk John de Sandale, who immediately re-granted them to Margery, the widow of Thomas de Barnardiston, and to John her son and the heirs of his body. It is supposed that the mother of Thomas was a Newmarch and that these transactions represented the settlement of the matrilineal inheritance upon his heirs. Kedington descended jointly with Barnardiston thereafter.

=== In Great Coates ===
By the same marriage of this Sir Thomas Barnardiston who had died by 1312, it appears that his wife Margery Wylegby brought the 'noble manor' of Great Coates in Lincolnshire to the Barnardiston family.

The Barnardiston's manor seat at Great Coates was a 'moated hall'. In 1919, it was noted that 'the moats formerly surrounding the residence' could still be seen, in a field known as 'Hall's Close', which was south-west of the church. An adjoining field, called 'Butt's Close', were the remains of the archery butts, mounds of earth used for target practice.

Among the monuments in the Great Coates church interior is a monumental brass dated 1420 dedicated to Lady Isabella, daughter of William Kelke of Barnetby and wife of Roger Barnardiston, and another, dating from around 1503, to the family of Sir Thomas Barnardiston. In Thomas Barnardiston's will, written and witnessed at Great Coates in April 1461, he requests to be buried in St. Nicholas Church 'on the north side of the altar under the window'.

== See also ==
- Barnardiston baronets
