= Sir Samuel Barnardiston, 1st Baronet =

English Whig Member of Parliament

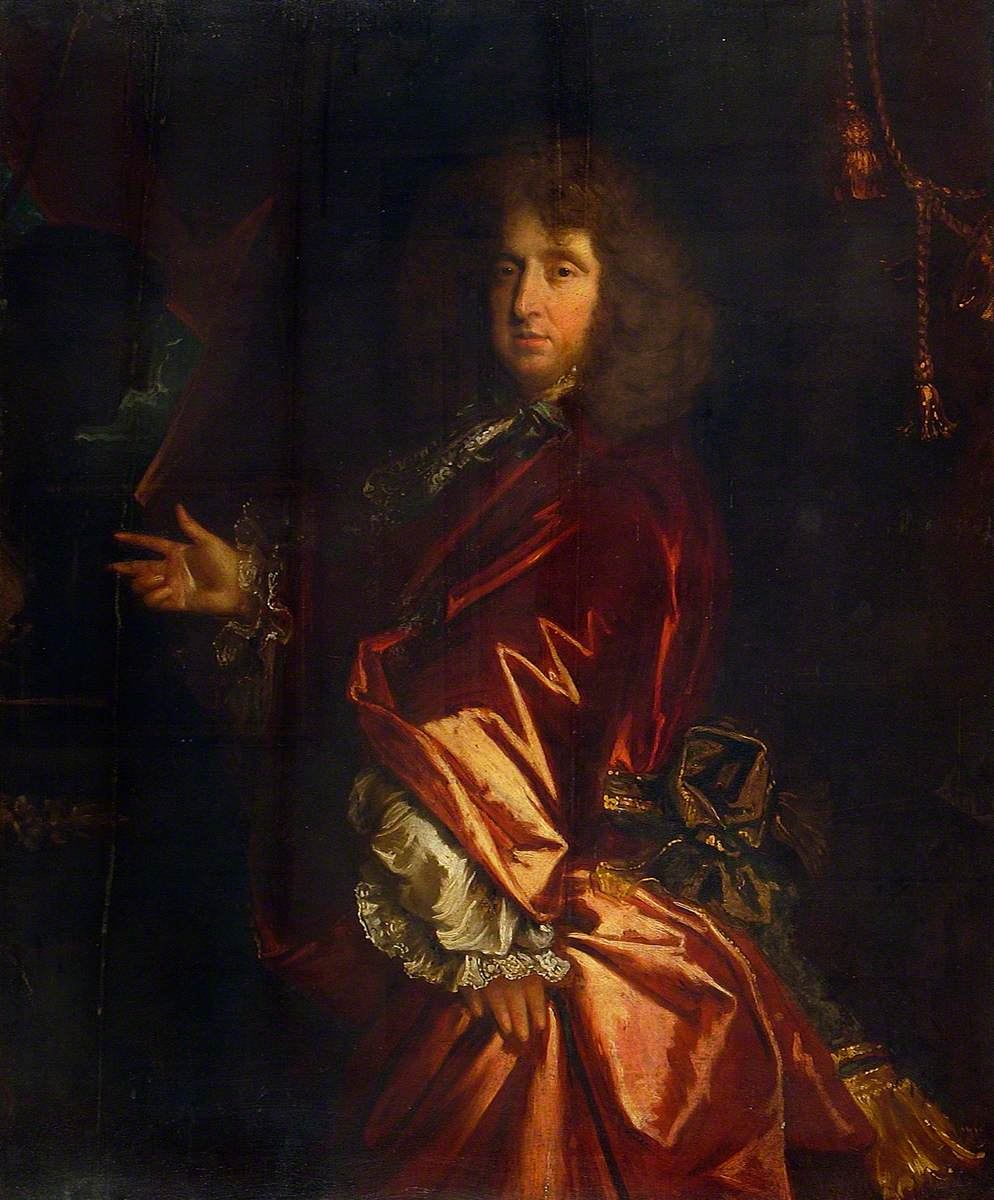
Sir Samuel Barnardiston by Jacob Huysmans

Sir Samuel Barnardiston, 1st Baronet (23 June 1620 – 8 November 1707) was an English Whig Member of Parliament and deputy governor of the East India Company. He was the defendant in some high-profile legal cases and involved in a highly contentious parliamentary election.

== Life ==
Born 23 June 1620, he was the third son of Sir Nathaniel Barnardiston and Jane (née Soame) Barnardiston. He joined the London apprentices in 1640 in the rioting that took place at Westminster on the appointment of Colonel Thomas Lunsford as constable of the Tower of London. According to an anecdote of Paul de Rapin, Barnardiston's prominence in the crowd of apprentices with distinctive haircuts on this occasion gave rise to the political use of the word Roundhead, when Queen Henrietta Maria called out "See what a handsome young Roundhead is there!"

Barnardiston became a Levant merchant, and in 1649 and 1650 he was residing at Smyrna as agent for the Levant Company, in whose service he became rich. He took no active part in the civil wars, but passed time during the Protectorate (1653-1659 in Suffolk. At Brightwell, near Ipswich, he purchased a large estate, and built a large house known as Brightwell Hall. Barnardiston's household had a Puritan chaplain; in 1663 he engaged Robert Franklyn. He opposed the high-church party in his neighbourhood, and in June 1667 reported to the council that Captain Nathaniel Daryll, commanding a regiment stationed at Ipswich, was a suspected papist.

In 1660 Barnardiston welcomed the Restoration and was rewarded by a knighthood, and in 1663 by a baronetcy. He was appointed High Sheriff of Suffolk for 1666–67.

In 1661 he was on the committee of the East India Company; from 1668 to 1670 he was deputy-governor, and came prominently before the public in Skinner's Case. Thomas Skinner, an independent English merchant, had had his ships confiscated by the company's agents for infringing its trading monopolies in India. Skinner appealed for redress to the House of Lords, which had awarded him £5,000 damages against the company. Sir Samuel, on behalf of the East India corporation, then presented a petition to the House of Commons against the action of the lords, and the lower house voted (2 May 1668) Skinner's complaint and the proceedings of the lords illegal. On 8 May Barnardiston was summoned to the bar of the upper house and invited to admit himself guilty of a scandalous libel against the house. He declined, was ordered upon his knees, and sentenced to a fine of £300, and to be imprisoned till the money was paid. Parliament was adjourned the same day. He refused to comply and was committed to the custody of the usher of the black rod, in whose hands he remained until 10 August following, when he was suddenly released without any explanation of the step being given. On 19 October 1669, at the first meeting of a new session of parliament, Barnardiston was called to the bar of the House of Commons, and there invited to describe the indignities which the lords had put upon him. The Commons voted the proceedings against him subversive of their rights and privileges. The Lords refused at first to vacate their action in the matter, and the quarrel between the Houses continued till December; but finally both houses yielded to the suggestion of the king to expunge from their journals the entries relating to the incident.

== Political career ==
In 1672 the death of Sir Henry North, 1st Baronet created a vacancy in the representation of Suffolk, and Barnardiston was the candidate chosen by the Whigs. The election was viewed as a trial of strength; Dissenters and the commercial classes supported Sir Samuel, and he gained seventy-eight votes more than his opponent, Lord Huntingtower. But Sir William Soame, the sheriff of Suffolk, was well-disposed to the losing candidate, and on the ground that Sir Samuel's supporters comprised many about whose right to vote he was in doubt, he sent up to the Commons a double return announcing the names of the two candidates, and leaving the House to decide their rights to the seat. Each candidate petitioned the house to amend the return in his interest; and after both petitions had been referred to a committee, Sir Samuel was declared duly elected, and took his seat. But these proceedings did not satisfy Barnardiston. He brought an action in the King's Bench against the sheriff, Soame, to recover damages for malicious behaviour towards him, and Soame was placed under arrest. The case was heard before Lord Chief Justice Matthew Hale on 13 November 1674, and judgment, with £800 damages, was given in favour of the plaintiff. By a writ of error the proceedings were afterwards transferred to the Exchequer Chamber, and there, by the verdict of six judges out of eight, the result of the first trial was reversed. In 1689 Sir Samuel, after renewing his complaint in the Commons, carried the action to the House of Lords. In the interval Soame had died, and his widow was now made the defendant. The lords heard the arguments of both parties in the middle of June, but they finally resolved to affirm the judgment of the Exchequer Chamber. The final judgment gave the House of Commons an exclusive right to determine the legality of the returns to their chamber, and of the conduct of returning officers. The two most elaborate judgments delivered in the case—that of Sir Robert Atkyns, one of the two judges who supported Sir Samuel in the Exchequer Chamber, and that of Lord North on the other side in the House of Lords, who, as attorney-general Sir Francis North, had been counsel for the defendant in the lower court—were published in 1689, and were frequently reprinted. The case was popularly viewed at the time as a political trial, and is given partisan commentary by Roger North, the Tory historian, in his Examen. North declares that Barnardiston throughout the proceedings sought the support of "the rabble", and pursued Soame with vindictiveness, in the first instance by making him bankrupt after the trial in the King's Bench, and in the second by sending the case to the House of Lords after his death.

The proceedings made Sir Samuel's seat in parliament secure for many years. He was again returned for Suffolk to the parliaments of 1678, 1679, and 1680, and to William III's parliaments of 1690, 1695, 1698, and 1701. Throughout his career he steadily supported the Whigs. In 1681 he was foreman of the grand jury of Middlesex which threw out the bill of high treason against the Earl of Shaftesbury. In 1683 he openly expressed his dissatisfaction with the proceedings that had followed the discovery of the Rye House Plot; but on 28 February 1684 he was summoned to take his trial for libel as 'being of a factious, seditious, and disaffected temper,' and having 'caused several letters to be written and published' reflecting on the king and officers of state. Two of the four letters which formed the basis of the charge were privately addressed to a Suffolk friend, Sir Philip Skippon, and the others to a linendraper of Ipswich and to a gentleman of Brightwell, with both of whom Sir Samuel was intimate. They contained sentences favouring William Russell, Lord Russell and Algernon Sydney, and stating that 'the papists and high tories are quite down in the mouth,' and that 'Sir George [Jeffreys] is grown very humble;' and on these words the accusation was founded. George Jeffreys, who had a personal concern in the matter, tried the case, and directed the jury to return a verdict of guilty on the ground that the act of sending the letters was itself seditious, and that there was no occasion to adduce evidence to prove a seditious intent. An arrest of judgment was moved for, and it was not till 19 April 1684 that Jeffreys pronounced sentence. A fine of £10,000 was imposed. Barnardiston resisted payment, and was imprisoned until June 1688, when he paid £6,000, and was released on giving a bond for the residue. The whole case was debated in the House of Lords, 16 May 1689, and Jeffreys's judgment reversed. An account of the trial was published in 1684.

Barnardiston took little in parliament as a speaker, but his financial ability was recognised. In 1690 he was nominated a member of the commission appointed to audit and control the public accounts, which discovered many frauds and embezzlements, and first effectively supervised the expenditure of the public money. In 1691 a quarrel with Sir Josiah Child, governor of the East India Company, caused him to retire from the management, and afterwards to withdraw the money he had invested in its stocks. The dispute was over party politics, Child being an adherent of the Tories, who were at the time in a majority on the board of directors. In 1697 Sir Samuel narrowly escaped imprisonment for a third time on disobeying the instructions of the House of Commons when deputed by them to attend a conference with the House of Lords for the purpose of regulating the importation of East India silk.

He retired from parliament in 1702, at the age of 82, and died, 8 November 1707, at his house in Bloomsbury Square, London.

== Family ==
He was twice married, (1) to Thomasine, daughter of Joseph Brand of Edwardstone, Suffolk, and (2) to Mary, daughter of Sir Abraham Reynardson, lord mayor of London. He had no children, and his nephew, Samuel, son of his eldest brother Nathaniel, succeeded to his title and estate, and died on 3 January 1710. Another nephew, Pelatiah, brother of the second baronet, was third baronet for little more than two years, dying on 4 May 1712. On the death a few months later (21 September 1712) of the fourth baronet, Nathaniel, son of Pelatiah Barnardiston, the first baronet's youngest brother, the baronetcy became extinct. Sir Samuel's house, Brightwell Hall, was pulled down in 1753.

Parliament of England
Preceded by Henry Felton; Sir Henry North, Bt	Member of Parliament for Suffolk; 1673–1684; With: Henry Felton (1673–1679); Sir Gervase Elwes, Bt (1679); Sir William Spring, Bt (1679–1684)	Succeeded by Sir Robert Broke, Bt; Sir Henry North, Bt
Preceded by Sir John Cordell, Bt; Sir John Rous, Bt	Member of Parliament for Suffolk; 1690–1702; With: Sir Gervase Elwes, Bt (1690–1698); The Earl of Dysart (1698–1702)	Succeeded by The Earl of Dysart; Sir Dudley Cullum, Bt
Baronetage of England
New creation	Baronet (of Brightwell); 1663–1707	Succeeded by Samuel Barnardiston
