= Clement Heigham (died 1634) =

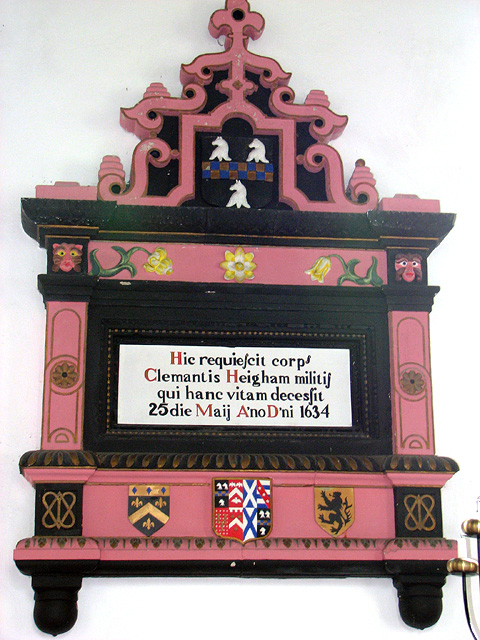
Plaque in the church of All Saints in Barrow

Sir Clement Heigham was an Elizabethan soldier and politician who was Member of Parliament for Suffolk in 1593.

He died in Barrow, Suffolk and was buried there on 25 May 1634.
