= Roger Drury (died 1420) =

Member of the Parliament of England

Sir Roger Drury (died 1420), of Thurston and Rougham in Suffolk, was an English landowner, soldier, administrator and politician.

== Origins ==
Born before 1363, he was the son and heir of Sir Nicholas Drury, of Thurston, and his wife Joan, daughter of Sir Simon Saxham, of Saxham in Suffolk.

The Drury family had settled at Thurston before 1225, being closely associated with the monastery of Bury St Edmunds from which they held land.

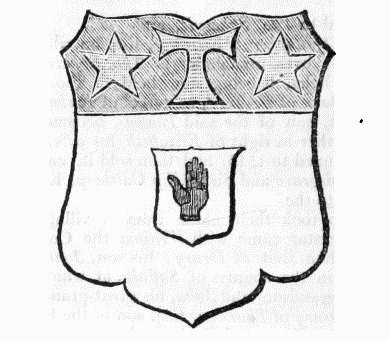
Arms used by the Drury family

== Career ==
On the death of his father in about 1384, he inherited manors in Thurston and Market Weston. His marriage about this time also brought him property in Rougham. He was appointed a tax collector for the county and was knighted.

In June 1386 he was called to military service in Ireland under Robert de Vere, 9th Earl of Oxford, to take 20 men-at-arms and 60 archers. By March 1387 he was serving at sea in the fleet under Richard FitzAlan, 11th Earl of Arundel and by the end of the year was part of the forces of Arundel and Thomas of Woodstock, 1st Duke of Gloucester which overcame the supporters of Oxford and took control of the government.

In 1391 he first sat as Member of Parliament (MP) for Suffolk, was appointed a justice of the peace (JP) and was named to various commissions in the county. In 1392 he was again called to military service in Ireland under Gloucester, to take nine men-at-arms and 30 archers. The expedition never sailed, but his links with the opposition to King Richard II meant that he gained no further appointments and had to buy a royal pardon.

Once King Henry IV came to the throne, he was able to re-enter public life. In 1401 he was again sent to Parliament for Suffolk, rejoined the bench as a JP and was appointed to various commissions. To both Great Councils of 1401 and 1403 he was summoned as one of the Suffolk knights, and sat a third time as the county's MP in 1407. In Suffolk affairs, among his many associates were the MP Sir Andrew Butler, of Waldingfield, and another MP John Wynter, of Barningham.

He made his will on 3 October 1420, granting bequests to several churches and friaries and including among his executors his brother Nicholas, his son-in-law William Clopton, and the Ipswich lawyer and MP James Andrew. He was dead by 24 October 1420, when the will was proved at Norwich, and was buried beside his wife in the church of St Mary at Rougham.

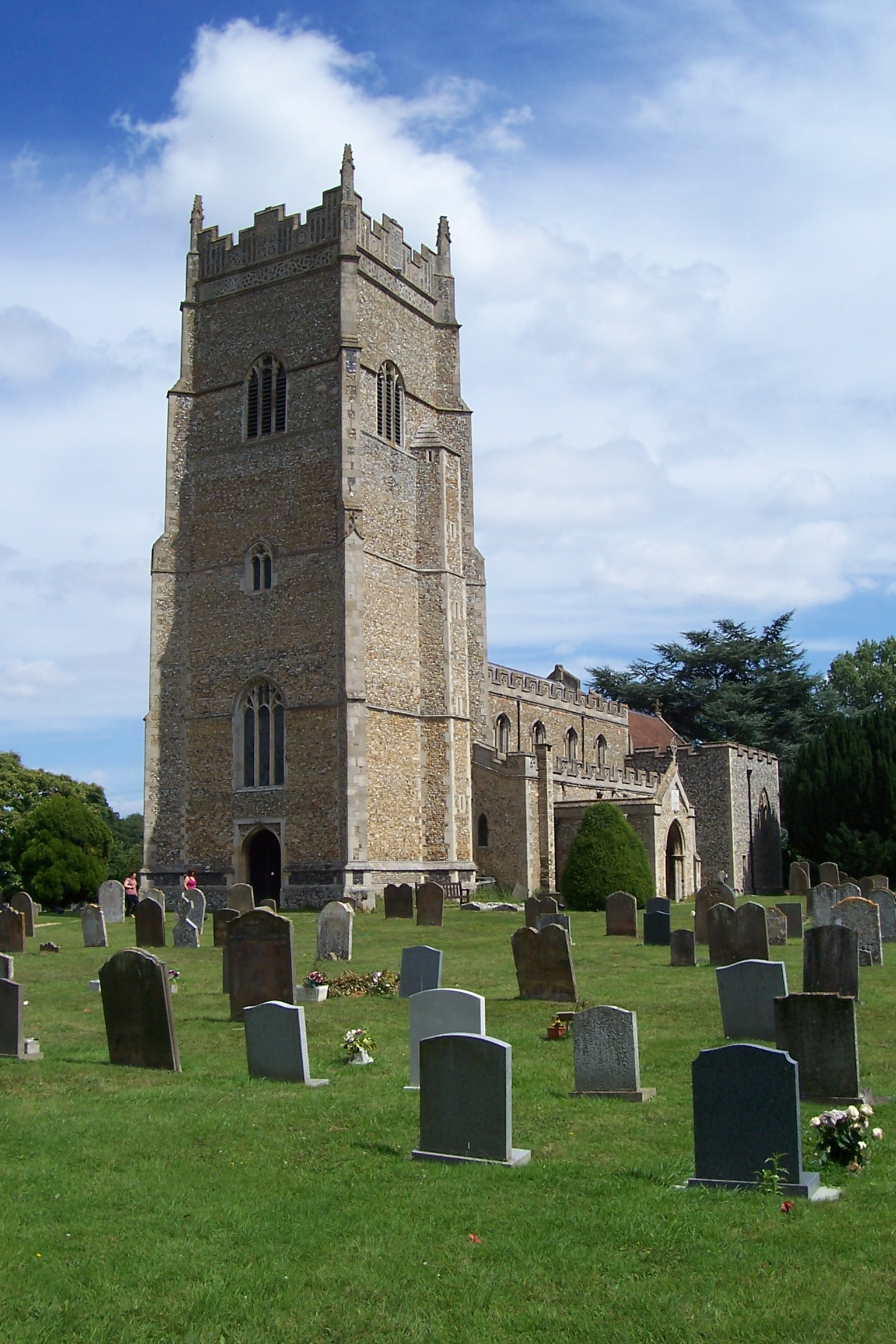
Church of St Mary at Rougham

== Family ==
Around 1384 he married Margaret (died 3 September 1405), daughter and heiress of Sir Thomas Naunton, of Rougham, and his wife Mary, daughter of John Aspall. Her paternal grandmother Eleanor was a daughter of Robert de Vere, 6th Earl of Oxford.

They had five sons and three daughters, including:

Sir William (died about 1450), his son and heir, who in about 1421 married Catherine (died 3 December 1478), daughter of Sir Thomas Swynford and his first wife Jane Crophull,, and granddaughter of Hugh Swynford and Catherine de Roet., John of Gaunt's mistress, and later third wife.
