= Samuel Moody =

English politician

Samuel Moody was a seventeenth century English politician. He was christened at Moulton, Suffolk on 31 March 1592. He was an Alderman in Bury St Edmunds by 1644. He was appointed to the First Suffolk Committee for Scandalous Ministers that year. He was later one of the two MPs for Bury St Edmunds in 1654 and 1656.

Samuel was born in Moulton, Suffolk, the son of George Moody and his wife Margaret Chenery.

Moody was one of the commissioners who sat on the Suffolk Committees for Scandalous Ministers.

Parliament of England
Preceded by Not represented in Barebones Parliament	Member of Parliament for Bury St Edmunds; 1654–1659; With: John Clarke	Succeeded by John Clarke
