= Joseph Brand (MP) =

English politician

Joseph Brand (c. 1605 - 9 October 1674) was an English merchant, landowner and politician who sat in the House of Commons in 1660.

Brand was the son of John Brand of Edwardstone and his wife Susan Lappage, daughter of Thomas Lappage of Boxford. He became a merchant in London and was a member of the Worshipful Company of Salters by 1632. He was only moderately successful and succeeded to his father's estates in Suffolk in 1642. He took no part in the Civil War but became a Presbyterian elder of Lavenham classis in 1645. He was commissioner for assessment for Suffolk in 1649. He was elected alderman of London in March 1650 but gave up the post on paying a fine in April 1650. From 1650 to 1670 he was a J.P. for Suffolk. He was commissioner for scandalous ministers in 1654 and commissioner for militia in 1659 and March 1660.

In 1660, Brand was elected Member of Parliament for Sudbury in the Convention Parliament. He was one of the MPs who were directed on 25 May 1660 to raise an immediate loan of £2,000 in the City but provided the money themselves after they ran into difficulties. He was one of those proposed for the order of Knight of the Royal Oak, with an annual income of £1,000. He was commissioner for assessment from August 1660 until his death and was Sheriff of Suffolk from 1662 to 1663.

Brand died at the age of 69 and was buried at Edwardstone.

Brand married m. by 1632, Thomasine Trotter, daughter of Thomas Trotter, merchant of London, by 1632 and had five sons and seven daughters.

Parliament of England
Preceded by Not represented in Restored Rump	Member of Parliament for Sudbury; 1660; With: John Gurdon	Succeeded by Thomas Waldegrave; Isaac Appleton
