= William Blois =

English politician

William Blois (or Bloys), (7 July 1600 - 1673) was an English politician based in Suffolk during the seventeenth century. He was one of the two MPs for Ipswich in the English parliaments from 1661 to 1670 and Suffolk in 1654 and 1656.

Blois was the first son of William Blois, a merchant, of Ipswich and Grundisburgh Hall and his wife Frances, daughter of John Tye of Ipswich. He married Elizabeth, the daughter of Sir Thomas Wingfield of Letheringham.
