= John Sicklemore =

English politician

John Sicklemore (c. 1612 – 1670) was an English politician.

Sicklemore was M.P. for Ipswich, between 1661 and his death in 1670. He served with William Blois.

John was the second son of John Sicklemore (d.1645) of Tuddenham and his wife Elizabeth, daughter of Thomas Fettiplace, an Ironmonger, of London.

Parliament of England
Preceded by Frederick Cornwallis and Francis Bacon	Member of Parliament for Ipswich; 1661–1670; With: William Blois	Succeeded by John Wright and William Blois
