= Charles Lawson (disambiguation) =

Charles Lawson (born 1959) is an actor from Northern Ireland

Charles Lawson may also refer to:

- Charles Lawson (nurseryman) (1795–1873), Scottish nurseryman and merchant
- Charles Olatunde Lawson, Nigerian civil servant
- C. Alan Lawson (born May 12, 1961), American attorney and jurist
- Charlie Lawson, American who murdered his wife and six of his seven children
- Sir Charles John Patrick Lawson, 4th Baronet (born 1959), of the Lawson baronets of Weetwood Grange
