= William Spring =

William Spring may refer to:

- Sir William Spring of Lavenham (died 1599), English MP for Suffolk in 1570
- Sir William Spring of Pakenham (died 1637), High Sheriff of Suffolk
- Sir William Spring, 1st Baronet (1613–1654), English MP for Bury St Edmunds and Suffolk in 1654
- Sir William Spring, 2nd Baronet (1642–1684), English MP for Suffolk 1679–1684
- Sir William Spring, 4th Baronet (1697–1736/7), English baronet
- William Spring (British Army officer) (1769–c.1839), British Army officer
