= Nether Hall, Suffolk =

Country house in Pakenham, Suffolk, England

Coordinates: 52.2663°N 0.8220°E

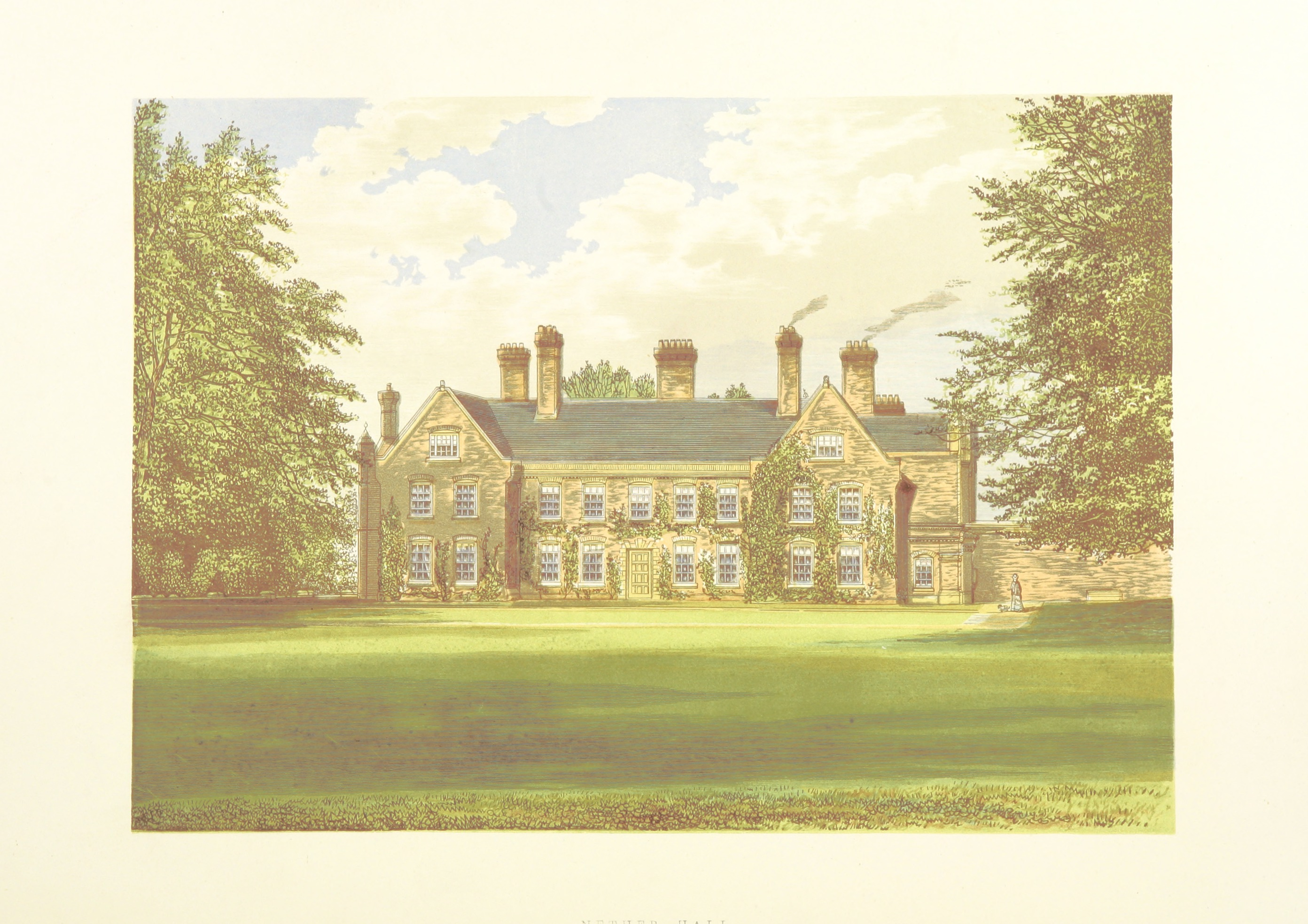
Nether Hall, Pakenham

Nether Hall is a country house situated in the village of Pakenham, Suffolk. It was one of the ancient manors of the village and seat of the Greene baronets.

== History ==
'Nether' refers to the Hall's 'lower' position in the village, compared to a superior Pakenham Hall that previously stood near Pakenham Wind Mill. Pakenham Hall was occupied by the Lord of the manor of Pakenham - firstly the Abbot of Bury St Edmunds and then the Spring family - while Nether Hall was originally the seat of the de Pakenham family, ancestors of the Earl of Longford. Nether Hall passed to Edmund de Pakenham in 1292, and when he died in 1332 to his widow, Rohais, or Rosia de Pakenham. After her death in 1352 it passed to her son, Edmund, and thence to his widow, Mary de Pakenham in 1360.

The Manor of Nether Hall remained in the possession of the de Pakenham's for about six descents. Theobald de Pakenham, the last holder, died without male issue. His granddaughter, Margaret, married Sir William de Bardwell, the standard bearer to Edward, the Black Prince. Nether Hall Manor then came into the possession of Bury St Edmunds Abbey. Following the Dissolution of the Monasteries it was acquired by Thomas Bacon and his son, George, who died in 1579. It then passed to his son and heir, John. This same Thomas Bacon, a member of a branch of the famous Bacon family of that era, was seated at Hessett. It was then purchased by the mercantile Bright family, who occupied Nether Hall for one hundred and sixty-four years. Robert Bright, the purchaser, is noted chiefly for the building of Newe House which was completed in 1622. He erected it originally to be his own residence; and his eldest, married son, Thomas lived in Nether Hall. Nether Hall remained in the possession of the Bright family until 1765.

Mary Bright, daughter of the fourth Thomas Bright, was the last of the name to inherit Nether Hall. She married Edmund Tyrell, of Plashwood Hall, Haughley, in 1744, and the estate was inherited by their son, Edmund Tyrell, after the death of his father. This son, who had also inherited Plashwood Hall, sold the Nether Hall estate to George Chinery, of Bury St. Edmunds. In 1807 he left the Nether Hall estate to his nephew, the Rev. William Bassett, who was Rector of Thurston. His son, William C. Bassett succeeded by entail and was residing in Nether Hall in 1857. The Nether Hall Estate changed hands again in 1886 when it was purchased by William Hardcastle for £38,000. He never lived in Nether Hall, and he very soon sold it to Sir Edward Greene, 1st Baronet, the Member of Parliament for Bury St Edmunds. When his son, Sir Raymond Greene, 2nd Baronet, died in 1920, the whole Estate was sold by his heirs to Mr A.J. Edwards, and then to the Martin family who modernised the interior of the building. Under the Martins Nether Hall became a country club of the Kristina Martin Charitable Trust. Nether Hall thus became a Country Club within the Trust. Mr Martin sold Nether Hall to the current occupants in 1987.
