= Spring baronets =

Hereditary title in the Baronetage of England

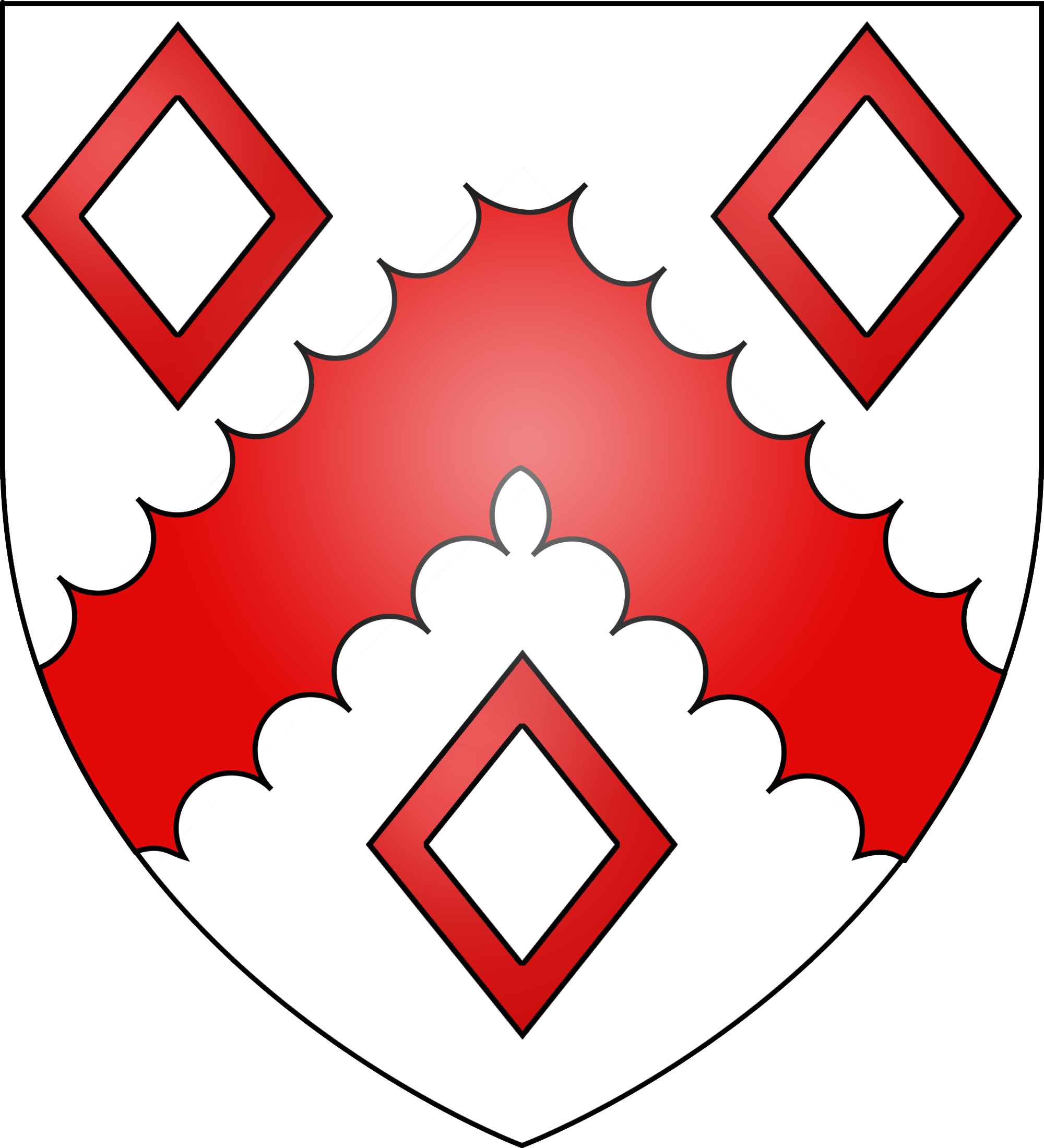
Arms of Spring of Pakenham: Argent, a chevron engrailed between three mascles gules

The Spring Baronetcy, of Pakenham in the County of Suffolk, is a title in the Baronetage of England.

== History ==
The title was created on 11 August 1641 for Sir William Spring, who had already been knighted by Charles I. The first baronet supported Parliament during the English Civil War and was a Member of Parliament for Bury St Edmunds and Suffolk during The Protectorate. His son, the second baronet William, was a beneficiary of the Indemnity and Oblivion Act and also represented Suffolk in the Habeas Corpus and Exclusion parliaments.

Upon the death of the fourth baronet without children in 1737, the title and estates separated. The baronetcy was inherited by the fourth baronet's uncle, while the estates were divided among his two surviving sisters. Burke's Peerage (1844) records the title as becoming extinct on the death of the fifth baronet in 1740. It was, however, inherited by the fifth baronet's son, who had been a page in the household of the Duke of Somerset. The sixth baronet died in 1769, at which point the title became dormant.

The family seat until 1737 was Pakenham Hall, Suffolk. The family motto is Non mihi sed Patriae (Latin), Not for myself but for my country.

== Spring baronets, of Pakenham (1641) ==
- Sir William Spring, 1st Baronet (1613–1654)
- Sir William Spring, 2nd Baronet (1642–1684)
- Sir Thomas Spring, 3rd Baronet (1672–1704)
- Sir William Spring, 4th Baronet (1697–1737)
- Sir John Spring, 5th Baronet (1674–1740)
- Sir John Spring, 6th Baronet (died 1769)
