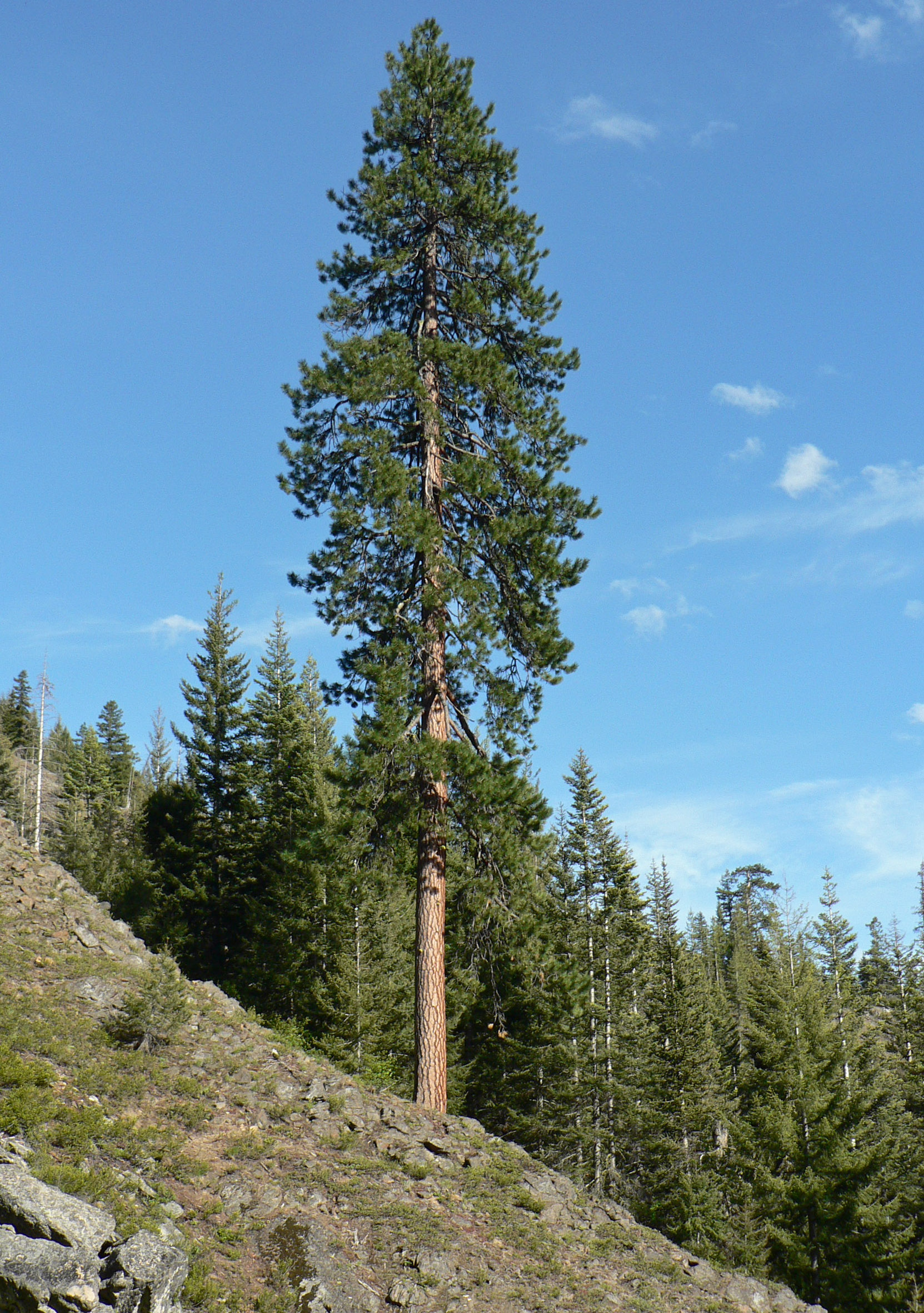
- Pinus ponderosa subsp. ponderosa

Conservation status
- Least Concern (IUCN 3.1)

- Secure (NatureServe)

Scientific classification
- Kingdom: Plantae
- Clade: Tracheophytes
- Clade: Gymnosperms
- Division: Pinophyta
- Class: Pinopsida
- Order: Pinales
- Family: Pinaceae
- Genus: Pinus
- Subgenus: P. subg. Pinus
- Section: P. sect. Trifoliae
- Subsection: P. subsect. Ponderosae
- Species: P. ponderosa

Binomial name
- Pinus ponderosa Douglas ex C.Lawson
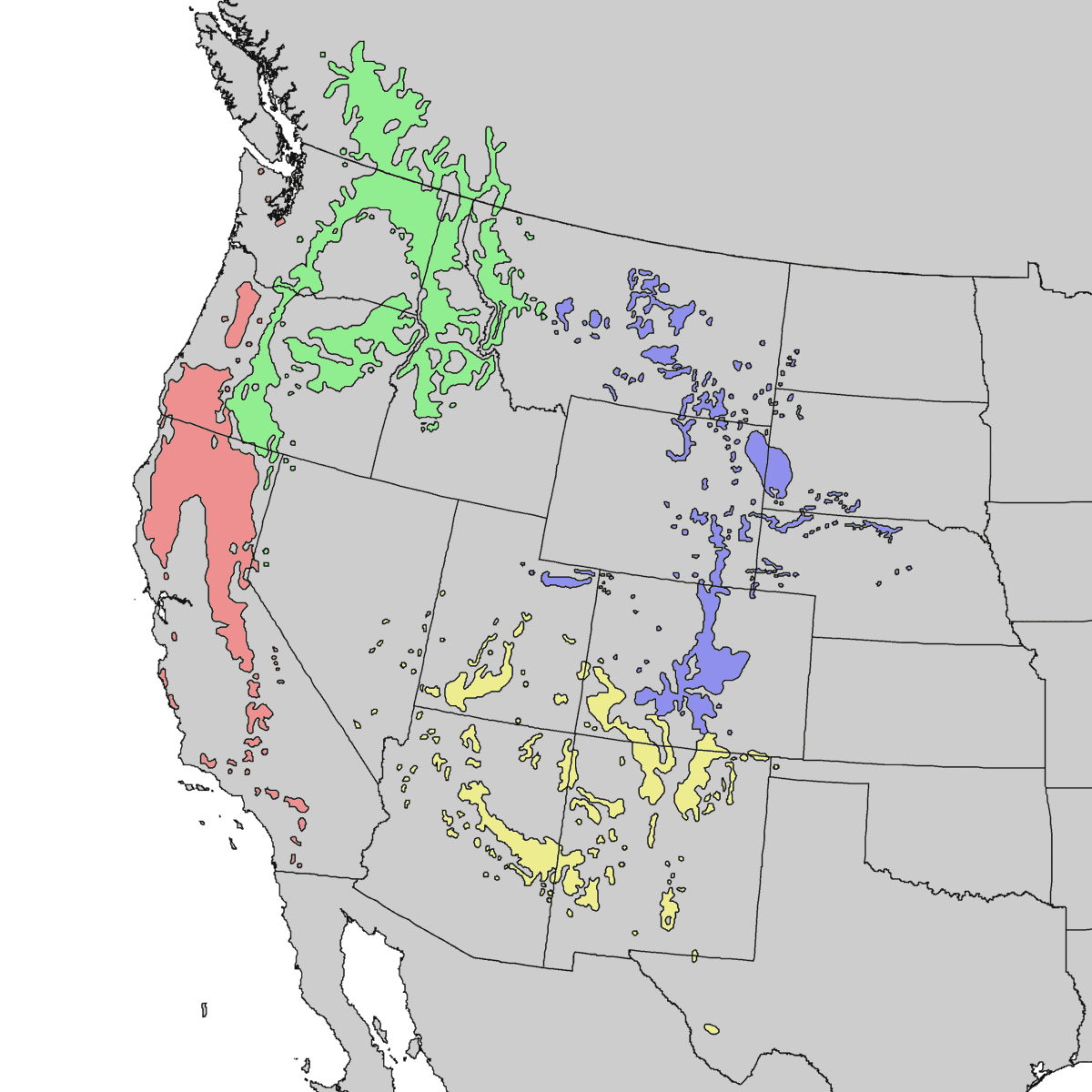
- Natural range of Pinus ponderosa green - P. ponderosa subsp. ponderosa red - P. ponderosa subsp. benthamiana blue - P. ponderosa subsp. scopulorum yellow - P. ponderosa subsp. brachyptera

= Pinus ponderosa =

Species of pine tree in western North America

Pinus ponderosa, commonly known as the ponderosa pine or western yellow pine, is a very large pine tree species of variable habitat native to mountainous regions of western North America. It is the most widely distributed pine species in North America.

Pinus ponderosa grows in various erect forms in 16 western U.S. states as well as British Columbia in Canada and has been introduced in temperate regions of Europe and in New Zealand. It was first documented in modern science in 1826 in eastern Washington near present-day Spokane (of which it is the official city tree). On that occasion, David Douglas misidentified it as Pinus resinosa (red pine). In 1829, Douglas concluded that he had a new pine among his specimens and coined the name Pinus ponderosa for its heavy wood. In 1836, it was formally named and described by Charles Lawson, a Scottish nurseryman. It was adopted as the official state tree of Montana in 1949.

Other vernacular names that have been used for the species are "bull pine" and "blackjack pine", but these are general woodsmans terms applied to growth stages of several different pines, rather than specific to Pinus ponderosa.

== Description ==
Pinus ponderosa bark in Montana

Pinus ponderosa is a large coniferous tree. The bark helps distinguish it from other species. Mature to overmature individuals have yellow to orange-red bark in broad to very broad plates with black crevices. Younger trees have blackish-brown bark, referred to as "blackjacks" by early loggers. The five varieties or subspecies, as classified by some botanists, can be identified by their characteristically bright-green needles (contrasting with blue-green needles that distinguish Jeffrey pine). The Pacific subspecies has the longest at 15–24 centimeters (6–9 1/2 inches) and most flexible needles in plume-like fascicles of three, and green immature cones. The North Plateau or Columbia ponderosa pine has long 12–20.5 cm (4 3/4–8 in) and relatively flexible needles in fascicles of three, and purple immature cones. The Rocky Mountains subspecies has shorter 9.2–14.4 cm (3 1/2–5 3/4 in) and stouter needles growing in bushy, tuft-like fascicles of two or three, and usually green immature cones (but purple at high altitudes). The southwestern subspecies has stout needles 11.2–19.8 cm (4 1/2–7 3/4 in) long, in fascicles of three (averaging 68.5–89 mm (2 3/4–3 1/2 in)). The central High Plains subspecies is characterized by the fewest branches (1.4 per whorl, on average; stout, upright branches at narrow angles from the trunk; and long green needles 14.8–17.9 cm (5 3/4–7 in) extending farthest along the branch, resembling a fox tail. Needles are widest, stoutest, and fewest (averaging 56–71 mm or 2 1/4–2 3/4 in) for the species.

The egg-shaped cones, which are often found in great number under trees, are 8–13 cm (3–5 in) long. Each scale has a sharp point.

Sources differ on the scent of P. ponderosa. Some state that the bark smells of turpentine, which could reflect the dominance of terpenes (alpha- and beta-pinenes, as well as delta-3-carene). Others state that it has no distinctive scent, while still others state that the bark smells like vanilla if sampled from a furrow. Sources agree that the Jeffrey pine is more strongly scented than the ponderosa pine. When carved into, pitch-filled stumps emit a scent of fresh pitch.

=== Size ===
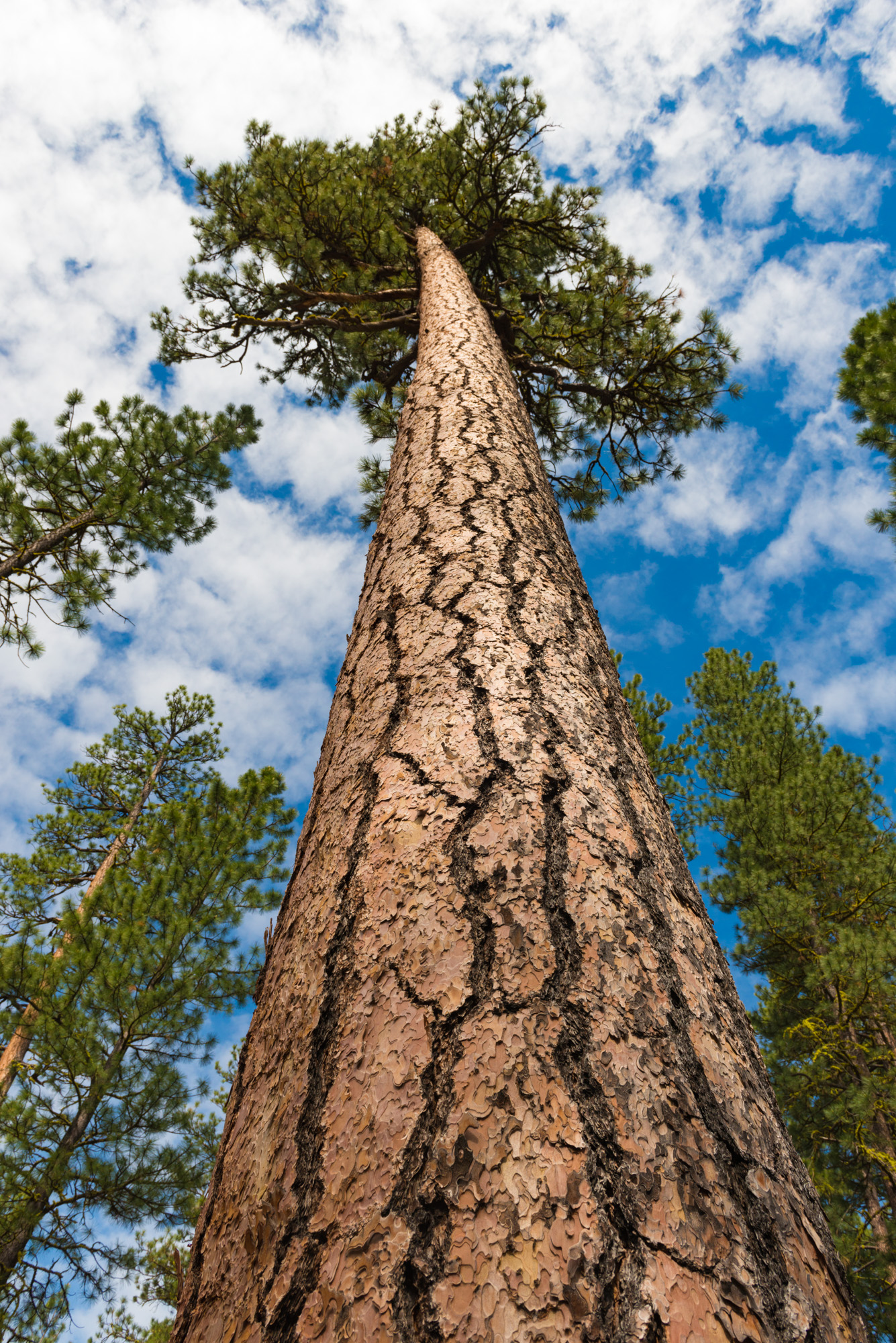
Ponderosa pines at Quartz Mountain Pass, Oregon

The National Register of Big Trees lists a ponderosa pine that is 72 m (235 feet) tall and 8.2 m (27 ft) in circumference. In January 2011, a Pacific ponderosa pine in the Rogue River–Siskiyou National Forest in Oregon was measured with a laser to be 81.79 m (268 ft 4 in) high. The measurement was performed by Michael Taylor and Mario Vaden, a professional arborist from Oregon. The tree was climbed on 13 October 2011, by Ascending The Giants (a tree-climbing company in Portland, Oregon) and directly measured with tape-line at 81.77 m (268 ft 3 in) high. As of 2015, a Pinus lambertiana specimen was measured at 83.45 m (273 ft 9 1/2 in), which surpassed the ponderosa pine previously considered the world's tallest pine tree.

== Taxonomy ==
Pinus ponderosa was scientifically described and named by Charles Lawson working from information provided by David Douglas in 1836.

The taxonomy of the ponderosa pine is heavily disputed by botanists and foresters. In a pair of research papers in 2013 for the US Forest Service, Robert Z. Callaham concluded that it is a single species from the Rocky Mountains to the Pacific coast divided into five subspecies. However, the USDA Natural Resources Conservation Service PLANTS database (PLANTS) lists these as varieties as of 2025. In the World Plants database maintained by Michael Hassler only three varieties are recognized, one described in 2024. On the other hand the World Flora Online (WFO) lists just two varieties. The Plants of the World Online (POWO) lists four varieties, but separates out two other taxa recognized as varieties as species. Similarly to POWO Christopher J. Earle writes in the Gymnosperm Database that the ponderosa pine has three subspecies and recognizes two taxa as species. In the Flora of North America (FNA) three varieties are recognized.

=== Subspecies and varieties ===
- Pinus ponderosa subsp. benthamiana (Hartw.) Silba, syn. Pinus benthamiana Hartw., Pinus ponderosa var. benthamiana (Hartw.) Vasey, Pinus ponderosa subsp. critchfieldiana Callaham (nom. superfl.), Pinus ponderosa var. pacifica J.R.Haller & Vivrette (nom. superfl.) – Pacific ponderosa pine

The Olympic Peninsula in Washington State, Oregon west of the Cascade Range, the whole of California, and far western Nevada, at 100–2,700 m (330–8,860 ft) on coastal-draining slopes of major mountain ranges. This is recognized by GRIN and PLANTS as the correct name for Callaham's subspecies critchfieldiana. It is also accepted by POWO but at varietal rank, but is currently considered a synonym of var. ponderosa by both World Plants and WFO. Both Callaham, and Haller & Vivrette, cited Hartweg's older name benthamiana in the synonymies of their new names, thus making them both invalid nomina superflua under Article 52 of the ICN. Despite this, POWO currently accepts var. pacifica.

- Pinus ponderosa subsp. brachyptera (Engelm.) Silba, syn. Pinus brachyptera Engelm., Pinus ponderosa var. brachyptera (Engelm.) Lemmon – southwestern ponderosa pine

Four corners transition zone, including southern Colorado, southern Utah, northern and central New Mexico and Arizona, westernmost Texas, and a single small population in the far northwestern Oklahoma panhandle. The Gila Wilderness contains one of the largest and healthiest forests. Hot with bimodal monsoonal rainfall; wet winters and summers contrast with dry springs and falls; mild to cold winters. This taxon is recognized by Callaham and GRIN as a subspecies, and in PLANTS at varietal rank, but is considered a synonym of var. scopulorum by WFO and FNA, of var. ponderosa by World Plants, and as the species Pinus brachyptera by POWO.

- Pinus ponderosa subsp. ponderosa Douglas ex C. Lawson – North plateau ponderosa pine, Columbia ponderosa pine

This is the autonymic subspecies of the species. Its range depends upon how many other taxa are combined with it. When treated as distinct as in Callaham, GRIN and the Jepson Herbarium, its range is from southeast British Columbia south through Washington and Oregon east of the Cascade Range to northeast California and western Nevada east of the Sierra Nevada, and in Idaho and western Montana. This area has cool, relatively moist summers; very cold, snowy winters (except in the very hot and very dry summers of central Oregon, most notably near Bend, which also has very cold and generally dry winters). As combined with subsp. benthamiana as in FNA it extends further south into California, but their treatment excludes western Montana.

- Pinus ponderosa subsp. scopulorum (Engelm.) A.E.Murray, syn. Pinus ponderosa var. scopulorum Engelm., Pinus scopulorum (Engelm.) Lemmon – Rocky Mountains ponderosa pine

This is recognized by Callaham and GRIN as a subspecies, and by WFO as a variety, PLANTS, World Plants, and the FNA. It is considered a separate species by POWO. The distribution of this taxa differs depending on its definition, being very widespread in the FNA's old, broad circumscription, and much more restricted by Callaham and in GRIN and POWO.

- Pinus ponderosa subsp. readiana Callaham – Central High Plains ponderosa pine

This is recognized by Callaham and GRIN as a subspecies, but not accepted by any of the other authorities, who all include its distribution mapped by Callaham within subsp./var. scopulorum. It includes the populations in southern South Dakota, Nebraska, and southeast Wyoming at lower altitudes on drier sites than typical of scopulorum.

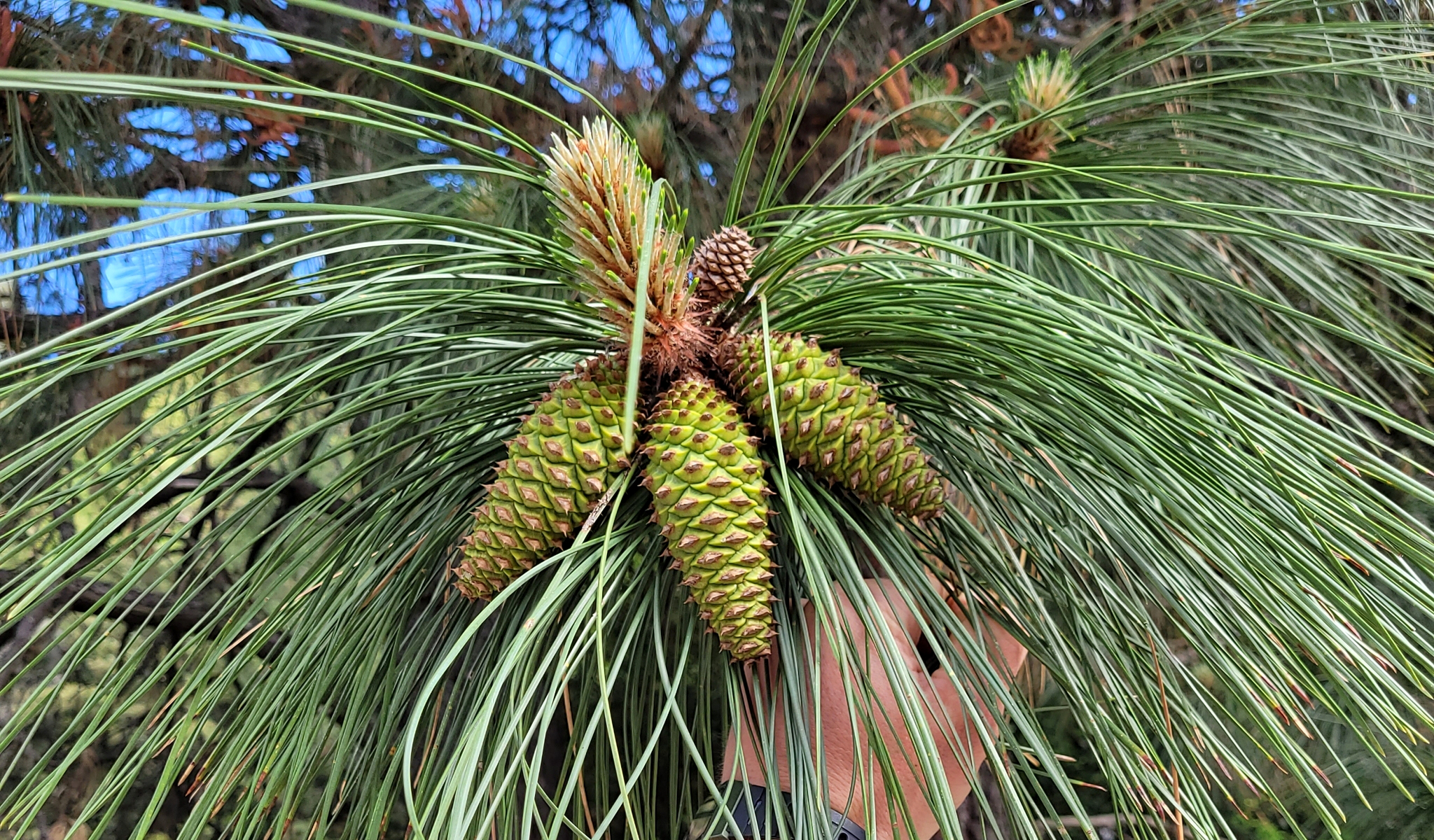
P. p. subsp. benthamiana, here at Downieville, California, always has green immature cones.

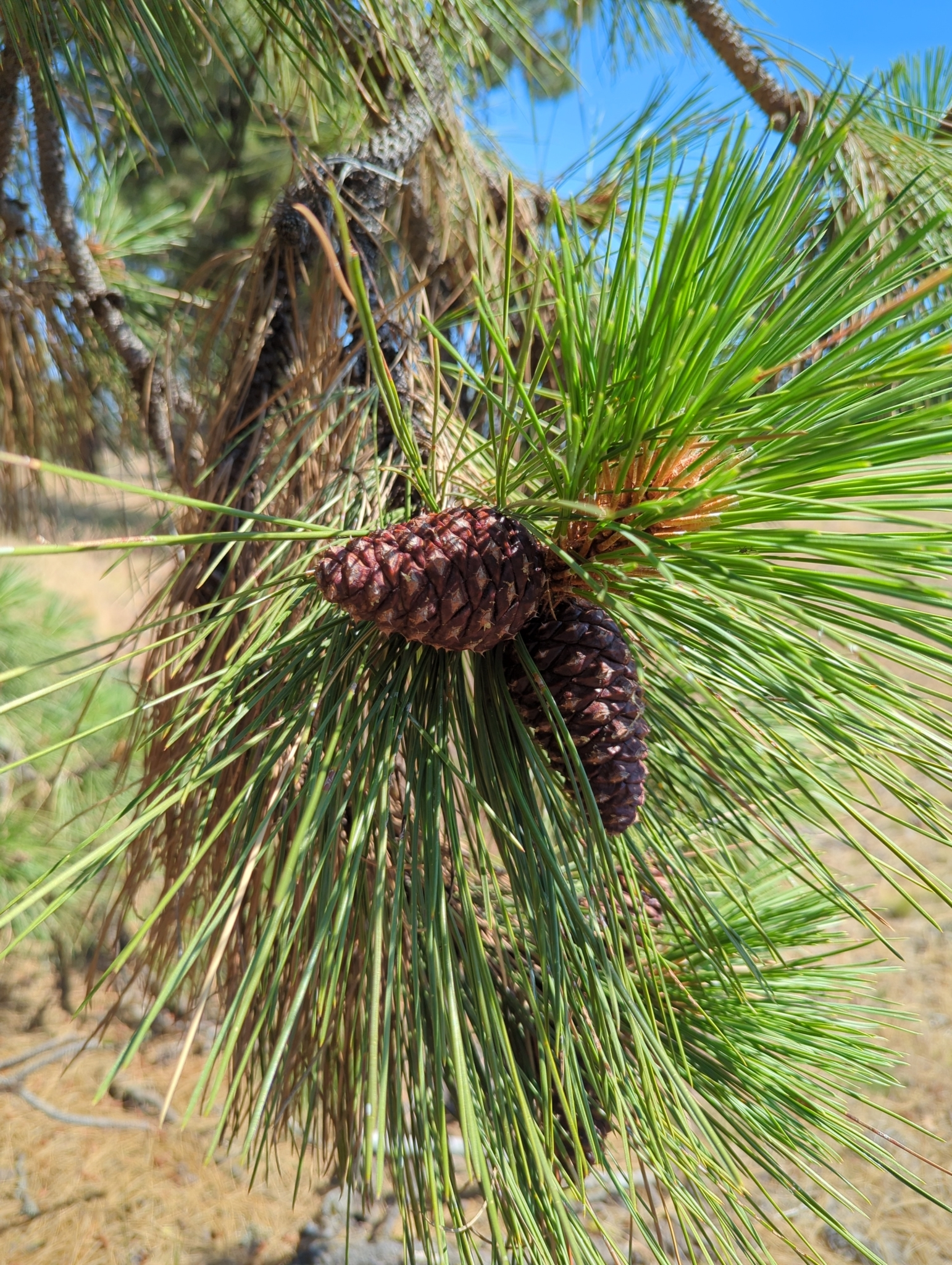
P. p. subsp. ponderosa, here near Spokane, eastern Washington, always has purple immature cones.

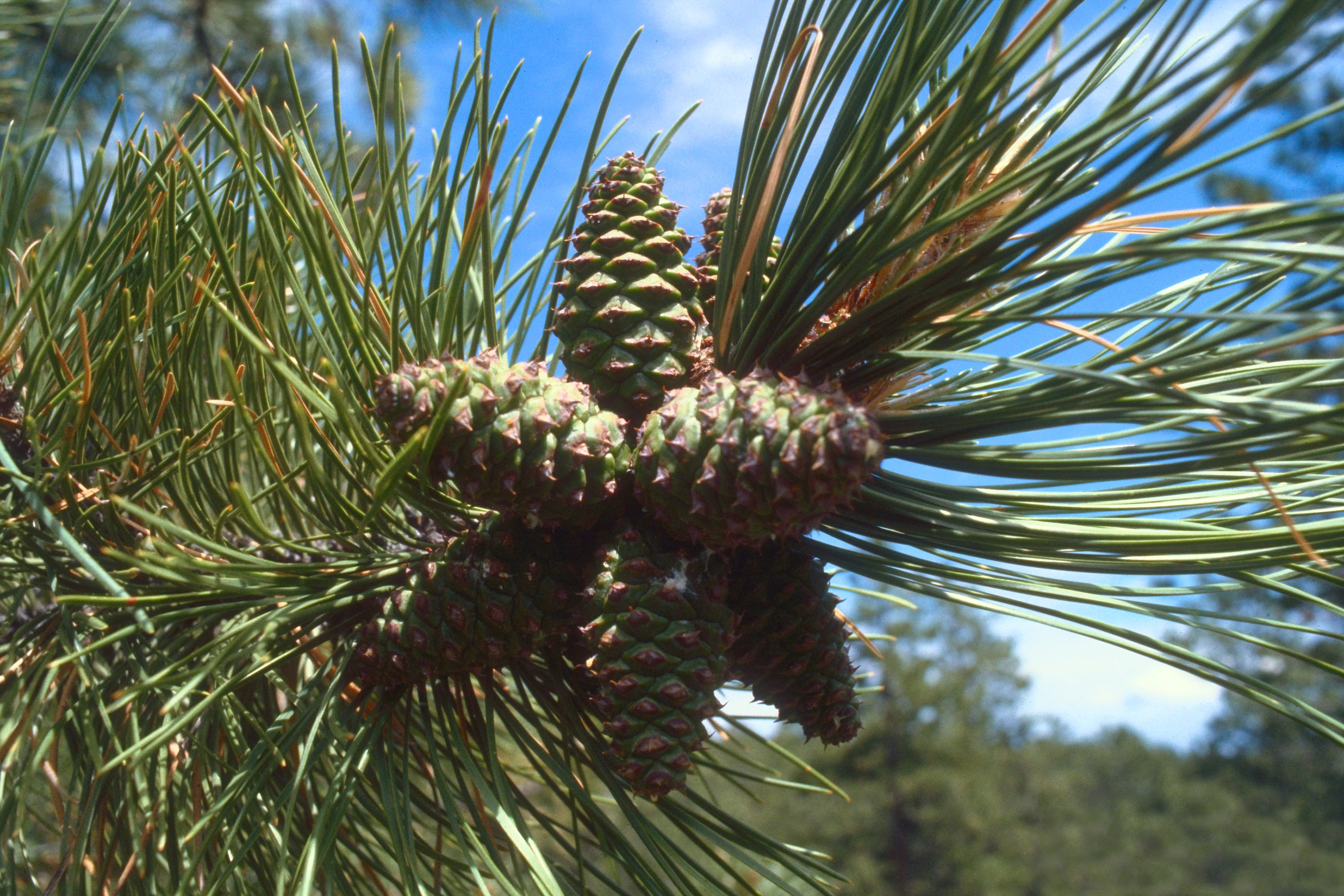
P. p. subsp. scopulorum, here in central Colorado, usually has green immature cones.

Distributions of the subspecies in Canada and the United States are shown on the map. Distribution of ponderosa pine is from Critchfield and Little.

Before the distinctions between the North Plateau and Pacific taxa were fully documented, most botanists assumed that ponderosa pines in both areas were the same. In 1948, when a botanist and a geneticist from California found a distinct tree on Mount Rose in western Nevada with some marked differences from the ponderosa pine they knew in California, they described it as a new species, Washoe pine Pinus washoensis H.Mason & Stockw. Subsequent research determined this to be one of the southernmost outliers of the typical North Plateau race of ponderosa pine. Trees of the North Plateau ponderosa indistinguishable from washoensis can be found as far north as Promontory Hill near Merritt in British Columbia in Canada. Some authors accept it as a valid variety Pinus ponderosa var. washoensis (H.Mason & Stockw.) J.R. Haller & Vivrette, while others treat it without distinction as a synonym of subsp./var. ponderosa. It has been reported from 2,000–3,000 m (6,600–9,800 ft), in upper mixed-conifer to lower subalpine habitats.

An additional possible variety, not formally described but colloquially named Willamette Valley ponderosa pine, is found in the Willamette Valley in western Oregon, where it is rare. This is likely just one of the many islands of Pacific subspecies of ponderosa pine occurring in the Willamette Valley and extending north to the southeast end of Puget Sound in Washington.

The closely related five-needled Arizona pine (Pinus arizonica) extends southward into Mexico. It was formerly often treated as another variety, as Pinus ponderosa var. arizonica (Engelm.) Shaw, but is now generally recognized as a separate species.

=== Distinguishing subspecies ===
The subspecies of P. ponderosa can be distinguished by measurements along several dimensions:

Common name	Pacific	North Plateau	Rocky Mountains	Southwestern	Central High Plains
Scientific name	P. p. benthamiana	P. p. ponderosa	P. p. scopulorum	P. p. brachyptera	P. p. readiana
Years needles remain green	3.9±0.25, N=30	4.7±0.14, N=50	5.7±0.28, N=23	4.3±0.18, N=24	4.7±0.18, N=5
Foliage length on branch (cm)	25.1±2.4, N=30	26.2±2.2, N=50	21.1±1.7, N=23	21.8±2.7, N=24	42.2±6.7, N=5
Needle length (cm)	19.8±0.44, N=30	16.8±0.29, N=48	11.2±0.27, N=23	14.7±0.45, N=24	15.6±0.57, N=5
Needles per fascicle	3.0±0.00, N=30	3.0±0.00, N=48	2.6±0.06, N=23	3.0±0.03, N=24	2.4±0.11, N=5
Needle thickness	45.9±0.49, N=30	47.8±0.51, N=48	46.4±0.68, N=23	44.8±0.87, N=24	49.7±0.61, N=5
Branches per whorl	4.4±0.13, N=30	3.7±0.11, N=50	3.0±0.17, N=23	3.4±0.25, N=23	2.3±0.11, N=5
Branch angle (° from vertical)	56±1.8, N=30	51±1.7, N=50	50±2.3, N=23	48±3.1, N=24	36±1.9, N=5
Seed cones length (mm)	101.4±2.48, N=25	88.7±1.24, N=36	70.7±2.20, N=22	74.9±2.51, N=20	71.1±2.46, N=5
Seed cones width (mm)	77.1±1.35, N=25	71.6±0.73, N=36	61.5±1.08, N=22	62.6±1.77, N=20	63.3±2.18, N=5
Seed cone form W/L	0.80±0.03, N=25	0.84±0.03, N=36	0.90±0.02, N=22	0.86±0.02, N=20	0.90±0.03, N=5
Seed length (mm)	7.5±0.08, N=23	7.6±0.16, N=14	6.3±0.09, N=17	6.4±0.18, N=16	7.0±0.12, N=5
Seed width (mm)	4.9±0.05, N=23	4.9±0.08, N=14	4.1±0.05, N=17	4.3±0.09, N=16	4.5±0.10, N=5
Seed + wing length (mm)	32.3±0.58, N=23	24.8±0.62, N=14	22.9±0.63, N=17	23.3±0.68, N=15	23.1±0.78, N=5
Immature cone color	apple green to yellow green	red-brown to dark purple	green; "above 2,500 to 3,000 m, some trees have distinctly purple cones"	green	green

Notes

Names of taxa and transition zones are on the map.
Numbers in columns were derived from multiple measurements of samples taken from 10 (infrequently fewer) trees on a varying number of geographically dispersed plots.
Numbers in each cell show calculated mean ± standard error and number of plots.

== Distribution ==
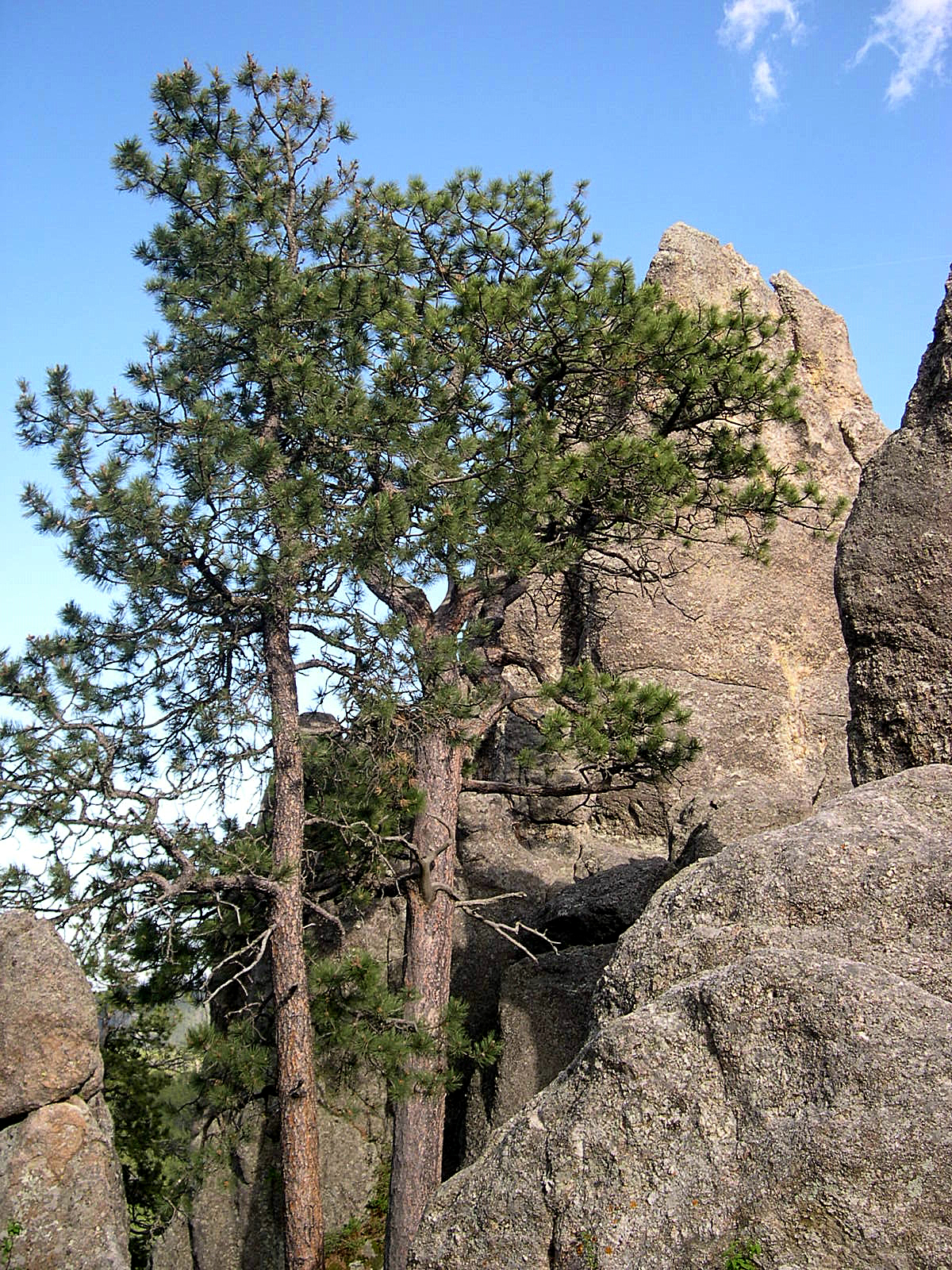
P. p. subsp. scopulorum, Custer State Park, South Dakota

Pinus ponderosa is a dominant tree in the Kuchler plant association, the ponderosa shrub forest. Like most western pines, the ponderosa is generally associated with mountainous topography. However, it is found on banks of the Niobrara River in Nebraska. Scattered stands occur in the Willamette Valley of Oregon and in the Okanagan Valley and Puget Sound areas of Washington. Stands occur throughout low level valleys in British Columbia reaching as far north as the Thompson, Fraser and Columbia watersheds. In its Northern limits, it grows only below 1,300 meters (4,300 ft) elevation, but is most common below 800 meters (2,600 ft). Ponderosa covers 4,000 square kilometers (1×10^{6} acres), or 80%, of the Black Hills of South Dakota. It is found on foothills and mid-height peaks of the northern, central, and southern Rocky Mountains, in the Cascade Range, in the Sierra Nevada, and in the maritime-influenced Coast Range. In Arizona, it predominates on the Mogollon Rim and is scattered on the Mogollon Plateau and on mid-height peaks (1,829 to 2,835 meters; 6,000 to 9,300 ft) in Arizona and New Mexico. Arizona pine (P. arizonica), found in the mountains of extreme southwestern New Mexico, southeastern Arizona, and northern Mexico, is sometimes classified as a variety of ponderosa pine, but is presently recognized as a separate species. Ponderosa pine are also found in the Chisos, Davis, and Guadalupe Mountains of Texas, at elevations between 1,219 and 2,438 meters (4,000 and 8,000 ft).

== Ecology ==
The fire cycle for ponderosa pine is 5 to 10 years, in which a natural ignition sparks a low-intensity fire. Low, once-a-decade fires are known to have helped specimens live for half a millennium or more. The tree has thick bark, and its buds are protected by needles, allowing even some younger individuals to survive weaker fires. In addition to being adapted to dry, fire-affected areas, the species often appears on the edges of deserts as it is comparatively drought resistant, partly due to the ability to close its leaf pores. It can also draw some of its water from sandy soils. Despite being relatively widespread in the American West, it is intolerant of shade.

Pinus ponderosa needles are the only known food of the caterpillars of the gelechiid moth Chionodes retiniella. Blue stain fungus, Grosmannia clavigera, is introduced in sapwood of P. ponderosa from the galleries of all species in the genus Dendroctonus (mountain pine beetle), which has caused much damage. Western pine and other beetles can be found consuming the bark. The seeds are eaten by squirrels, chipmunks, quail, grouse, and Clark's nutcracker, while mule deer browse the seedlings.

Various animals nest in the ponderosa pines, such as the pileated woodpecker.

=== Pathology ===
Pinus ponderosa is affected by Armillaria, Phaeolus schweinitzii, Fomes pini, Atropellis canker, dwarf mistletoe, Polyporus anceps, Verticicladiella, Elytroderma needle cast, and western gall rust.

=== As an invasive species ===
Pinus ponderosa is classed as a "wilding pine" and spreads as an invasive species throughout the high country of New Zealand, where it is beginning to take over, causing the native species of plants not to be able to grow in those locations. It is also considered a "weed" in parts of Australia.

== Uses ==
Native Americans consumed the seeds and sweet inner bark. They chewed the dried pitch, which was also used as a salve. They used the limbs and branches as firewood and building material, and the trunks were carved into canoes. The needles and roots were made into baskets. The needles were also boiled into a solution to treat coughs and fevers.

=== Commercial Uses ===
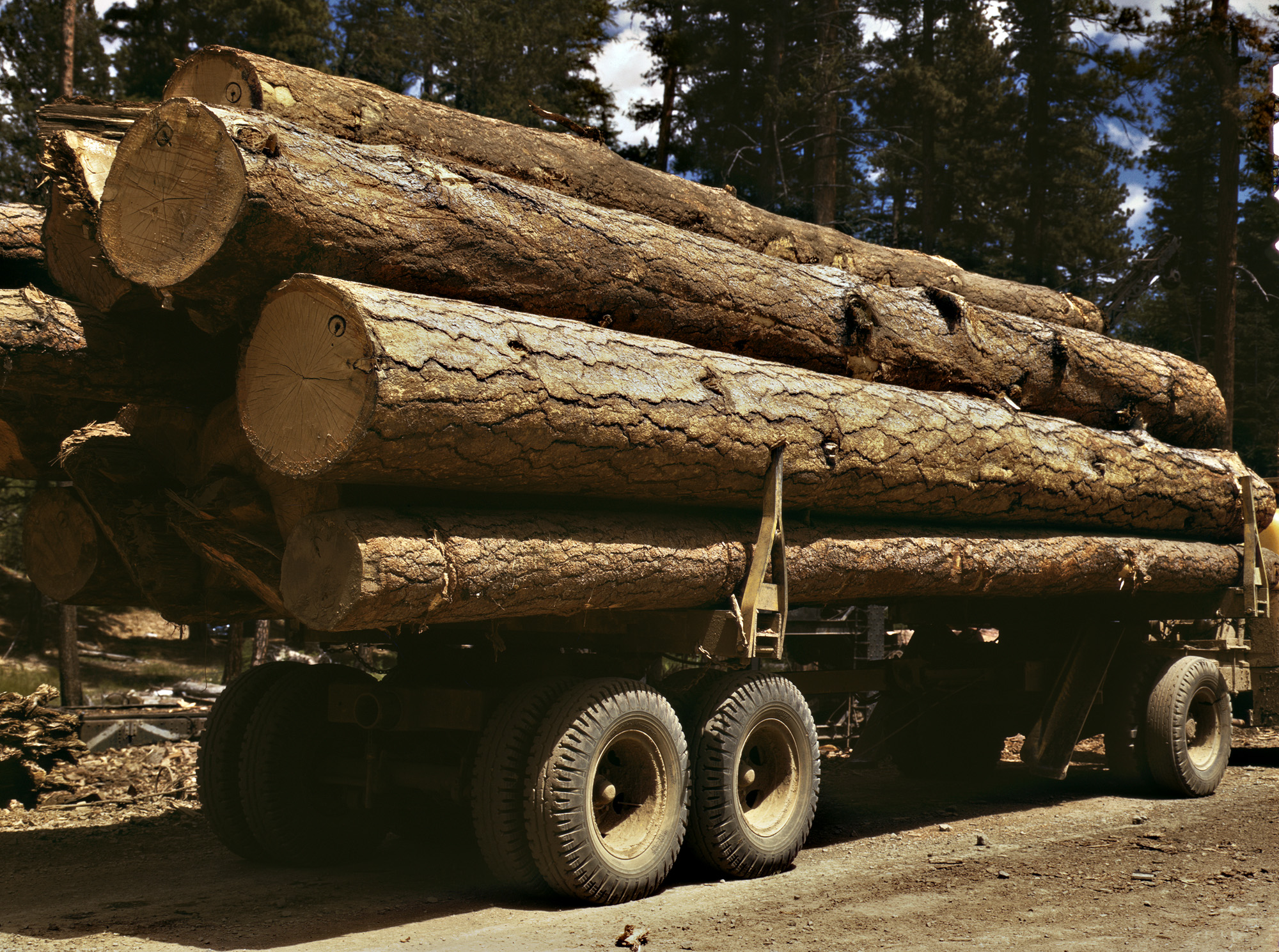
Truck load of ponderosa pine.

Ponderosa pine has long been an important commercial timber species in western North America, valued for its versatile wood. In both the United States and Canada (primarily British Columbia), ponderosa pine forests have been harvested for lumber and other wood products since the 19th century. Old-growth trees were widely used by settlers as lumber, including for railroads. The wood is pale yellow to light brown, straight-grained, and moderately soft, making it suitable for a wide range of applications in construction and manufacturing. Younger trees are of poor quality for lumber due to the tendency to warp.

==== Structural lumber ====
Ponderosa pine is extensively used as dimensional lumber in light construction. Its timber is easily milled and was one of the first western woods shipped in quantity to eastern markets in the early 20th century. Common construction uses have included framing (studs and joists), roof decking, and sheathing in houses where only moderate strength is required. By the mid-20th century, annual production of ponderosa pine lumber was very high; for example, harvests exceeded 3 billion board feet per year by the late 1930s and peaked at over 4 billion board feet in 1941.

In addition to sawtimber, ponderosa pine is used in round log form for various purposes. The straight trunks were historically sought for utility poles and fence posts; when properly dried or treated, the wood has fair durability in these uses. Early 20th-century mining operations also used ponderosa pine for mine timbers and tunnel supports. The wood from younger, fast-grown ponderosa pines tends to warp, limiting its use in structural applications. Historically, the highest quality heavy timbers came from large, old-growth trees.

===== Blue stained pine =====
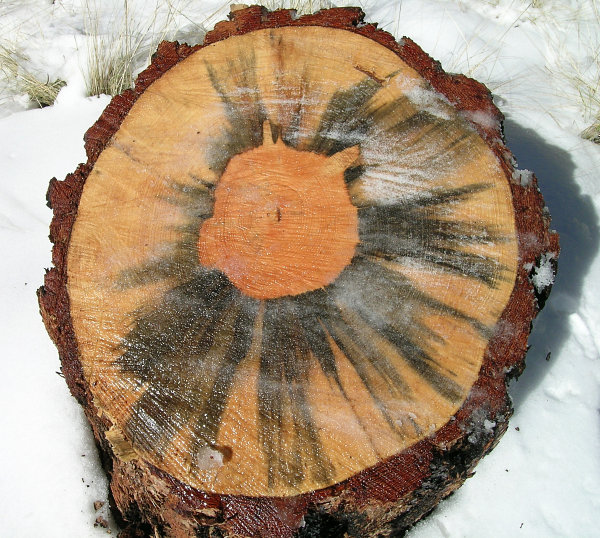
Grosmannia clavigera (blue stain fungus).

Blue-stained pine is wood marked by blue-gray streaks caused by fungi spread by the mountain pine beetle (Dendroctonus ponderosae). As the beetles infest trees like ponderosa and lodgepole pine, they introduce blue-stain fungi (Grosmannia spp.), which colonize the sapwood but do not weaken the wood structurally. Although often discounted in the marketplace due to its appearance, blue-stained pine is gaining popularity in sustainable and rustic design, where its distinct color is embraced as a natural and decorative feature.

==== Engineered Wood and Paper Products ====
Ponderosa pine is widely used in the production of engineered wood and pulp products. A large share of harvested logs goes into plywood, particleboard, fiberboard, and paper. Ponderosa pine peeler logs are rotary-cut to produce veneer, which is used in plywood panels.Although it is less strong than Douglas-fir plywood, it meets the requirements for many light-duty structural and non-structural applications, including furniture panels and drawer bottoms. The wood's light color and pleasant pine scent add to its appeal for interior use.

==== Notable uses and structures ====
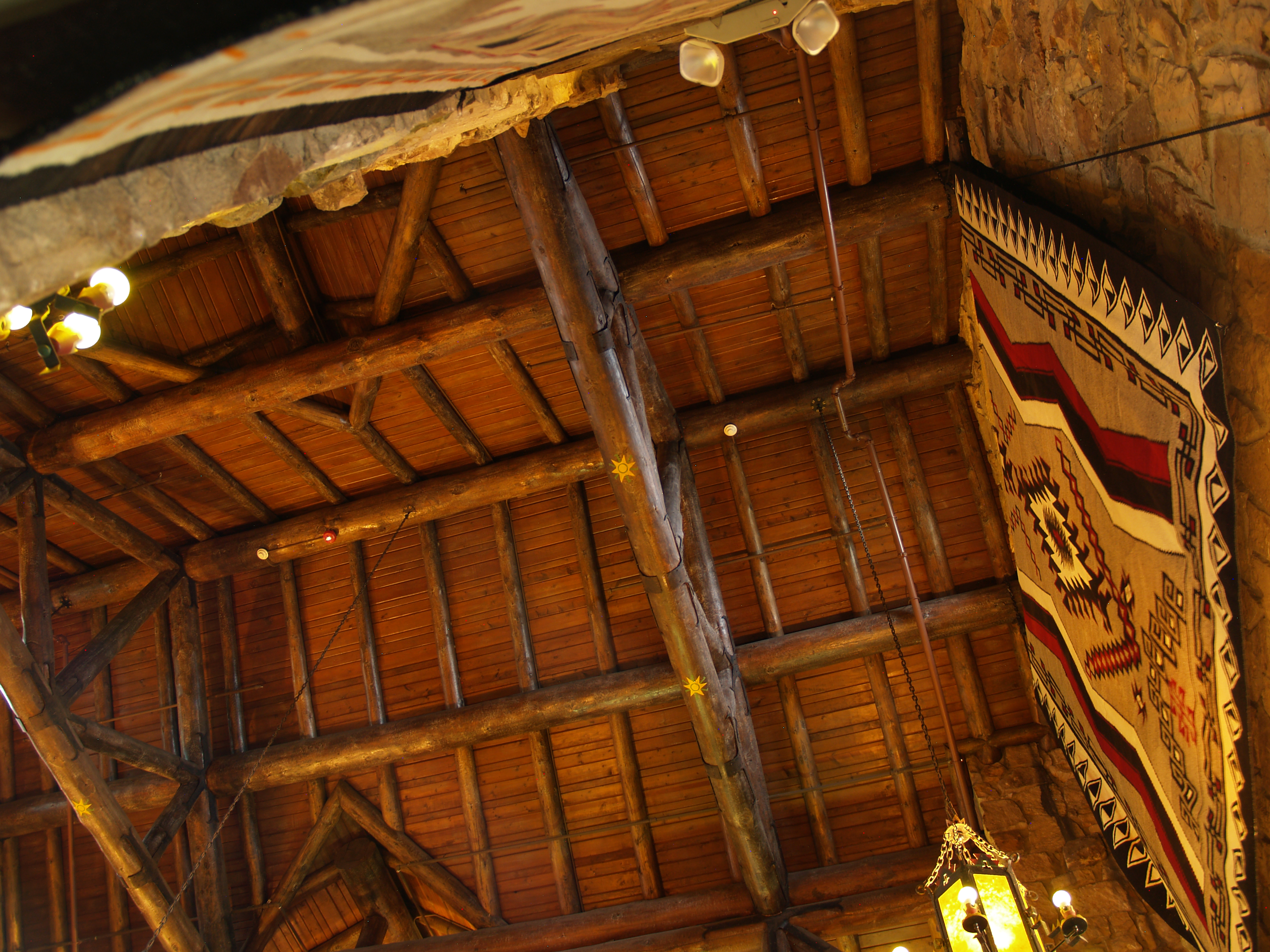
Ponderosa pine ceiling in the historic Grand Canyon Lodge.

Because of its abundance and warm appearance, ponderosa pine has been used in many notable western U.S. buildings, often contributing to a rustic, parkitecture aesthetic. One iconic example is the Grand Canyon Lodge where architect Gilbert Stanley Underwood used massive ponderosa beams for the sloped roof and expansive interiors. Another example is Fuller Lodge in Los Alamos, New Mexico, using more than 700 locally harvested ponderosa logs in its log-style design.

=== Cultivation ===
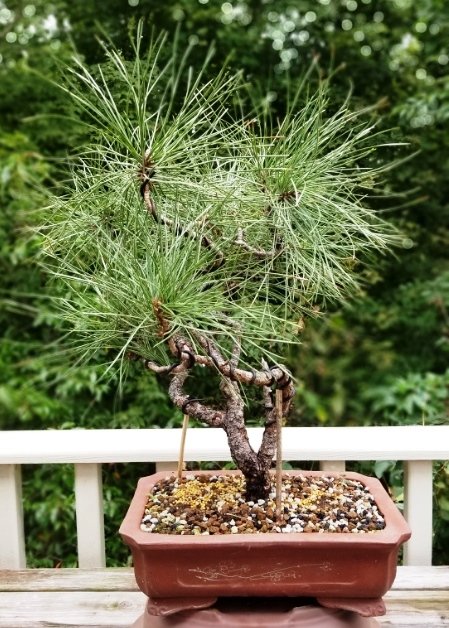
Pinus ponderosa as bonsai, some 40 years old; its long needles make bonsai challenging.

Cultivated as a bonsai, ponderosas are prized for their rough, flaky bark, contorted trunks, flexible limbs, and dramatic deadwood. Collected specimens can be wildly sculpted by their environment, resulting in beautiful twisted trunks, limbs and deadwood. In the mountains they can be found growing in pockets in the rock, stunting their growth. The main challenge for this species in bonsai cultivation is the natural long length of its needles, which takes years of training and care to reduce.

This species is grown as an ornamental plant in parks and large gardens.

== Culture ==
Pinus ponderosa is the official state tree of Montana. In a 1908 poll to determine the state tree, Montana schoolchildren chose the tree over the Douglas fir, American larch, and cottonwood. However, the tree was not officially named the state tree until 1949.

The Ponderosa Ranch in the classic TV series Bonanza was named after the ponderosa pine, commonly found in the Lake Tahoe region where the fictional Cartwright family's ranch was set. Bonanza was one of the first Westerns to be filmed in color and made frequent visual use of scenic pine forests to emphasize the ranch's size and frontier beauty.

== See also ==
- Southern yellow pine

== General references ==
- Chase, J. Smeaton (1911). Cone-bearing Trees of the California Mountains. Eytel, Carl (illustrations). Chicago: A.C. McClurg & Co. pp. 16–18. LCCN 11004975. OCLC 3477527.
- Farjon, A. (2013). "Pinus ponderosa". IUCN Red List of Threatened Species. 2013 e.T42401A2977432. doi:10.2305/IUCN.UK.2013-1.RLTS.T42401A2977432.en.
- Conkle, MT; Critchfield, WB (1988). "Genetic variation and hybridization of ponderosa pine". In Baumgartner, DM; Lotan, JE (eds.). Ponderosa pine the species and its management. Cooperative Extension, Washington State University. pp. 27–44.
- Critchfield, WB (1984). "Crossability and relationships of Washoe Pine". Madroño. 31: 144–170.
- Critchfield, WB; Allenbaugh, GL (1965). "Washoe pine on the Bald Mountain Range, California". Madroño. 18: 63–64.
- Farjon, A (2005). Pines (2nd ed.). Leiden & Boston: Brill. ISBN 90-04-13916-8.
- Haller, JR (1962). Variation and hybridization in ponderosa and Jeffrey pines. University of California Publications in Botany. Vol. 34. pp. 123–166.
- Haller, JR (1965). "The role of 2-needle fascicles in the adaptation and evolution of ponderosa pine". Brittonia. 17 (4): 354–382. Bibcode:1965Britt..17..354H. doi:10.2307/2805029. JSTOR 2805029. S2CID 32656015.
- Haller, JR; Vivrette, NJ (2011). "Ponderosa pine revisited". Aliso. 29 (1): 53–57. doi:10.5642/aliso.20112901.07.
- Lauria, F (1991). "Taxonomy, systematics, and phylogeny of Pinus subsection Ponderosae Loudon (Pinaceae). Alternative concepts". Linzer Biol. Beitr. 23 (1): 129–202.
- Lauria, F (1996). "The identity of Pinus ponderosa Douglas ex C.Lawson (Pinaceae)". Linzer Biol. Beitr. 28 (2): 999–1052.
- Lauria, F (1996). "Typification of Pinus benthamiana Hartw. (Pinaceae), a taxon deserving renewed botanical examination". Ann. Naturhist. Mus. Wien. 98 (B Suppl): 427–446.
- Mirov, NT (1929). "Chemical analysis of the oleoresins as a means of distinguishing Jeffrey pine and western yellow pine". Journal of Forestry. 27 (2): 176–187. doi:10.1093/jof/27.2.176.
- Van Haverbeke, DF (1986). Genetic variation in ponderosa pine: A 15-Year Test of provenances in the Great Plains. USDA Forest Service. Research Paper RM-265.
- Wagener, WW (1960). "A comment on cold susceptibility of ponderosa and Jeffrey pines". Madroño. 15: 217–219.
