= Sir Thomas Spring, 3rd Baronet =

English baronet and landowner

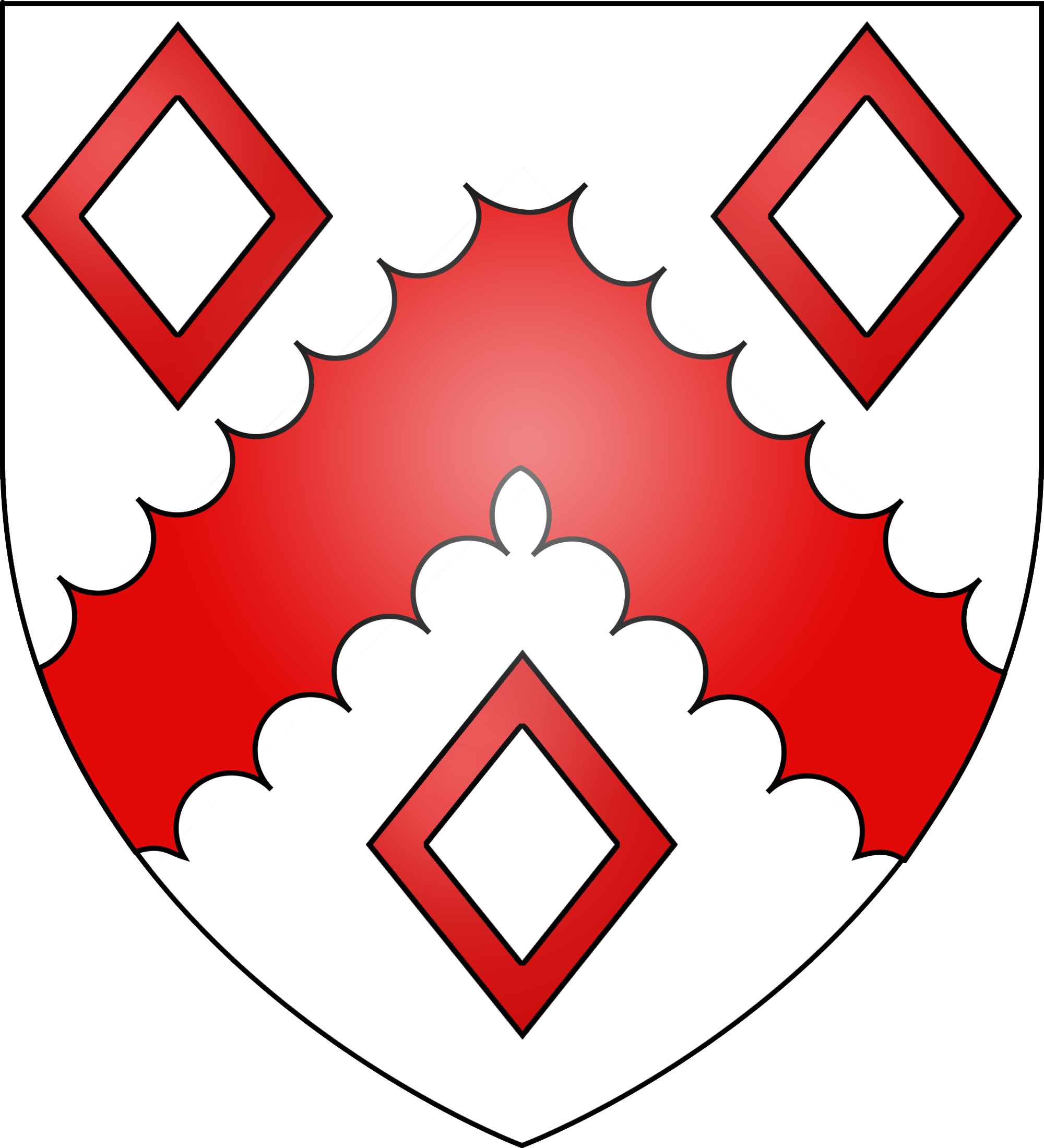
Arms of Spring: Argent, a chevron engrailed between three mascles gules

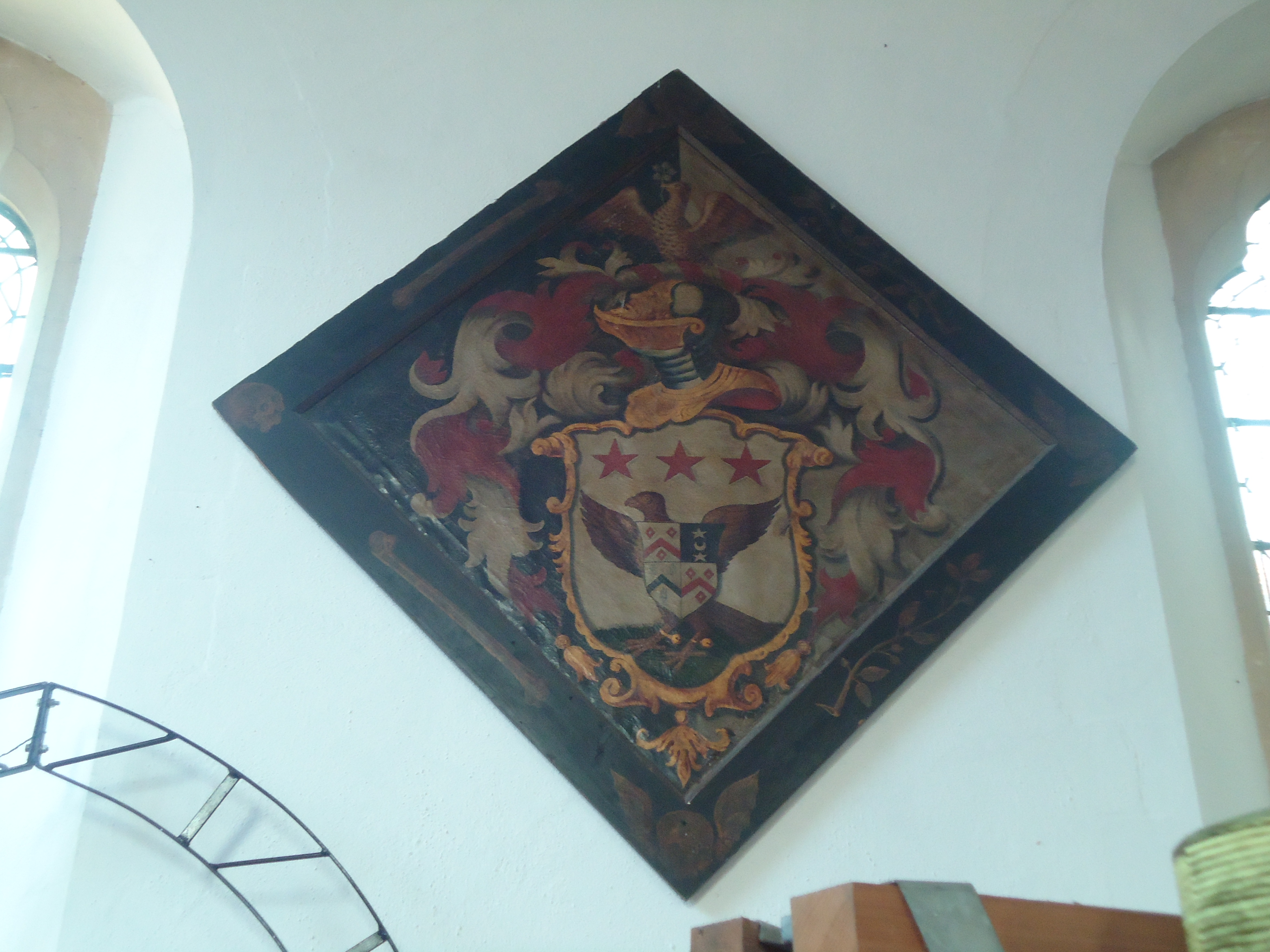
Hatchment in Packenham Church of Thomas Discipline of Bury St Edmunds, who married Merolina Spring (1695–1761), heiress of Pakenham, a daughter of Sir Thomas Spring, 3rd Baronet and one of the two sisters and co-heiresses of Sir William Spring, 4th Baronet. Arms: Discipline with inescutcheon of Spring

Sir Thomas Spring, 3rd Baronet (c. 1672 – 2 April 1704) of Pakenham Hall in Pakenham, Suffolk, was an English baronet and landowner who served as High Sheriff of Suffolk in 1696.

== Career ==
Spring was the eldest son of Sir William Spring, 2nd Baronet and Sarah Cordell, daughter of Sir Robert Cordell, 1st Baronet of Melford Hall, Suffolk. He was educated at Christ's College, Cambridge and inherited his father's title and estate upon his death in 1684.

== Marriage and issue ==
On 23 May 1691, he married Hon. Merolina Jermyn, a daughter and co-heiress of Thomas Jermyn, 2nd Baron Jermyn and Mary Merry, and co-heiress of Henry Jermyn, 1st Baron Dover. They had three sons and six daughters:

- Thomas Spring (died 1694)
- Merolina Spring (died 1694)
- Merolina Spring (1695–1761), married Thomas Discipline of Bury St Edmunds. She inherited the manor of Packenham, in the church of which survives the funeral hatchment of Thomas Discipline, showing his arms with inescutcheon of Spring.
- Sir William Spring, 4th Baronet (1697–1736), died unmarried. He bequeathed his estates to his two surviving sisters, Merolina and Mary, but was succeeded in the baronetcy by his uncle Sir John Spring, 5th Baronet (1674–1740).
- Mary Spring (1698–1765), married Revd. John Symonds and was the mother of John Symonds and Thomas Symonds and grandmother of Admiral Sir William Symonds
- Penelope Spring (1700–1707)
- Jermyn Spring (died aged 17)
- Henrietta Maria Spring (died January 1733), died unmarried
- Delariviera Spring (died 1 February 1733), died unmarried

== Death and succession ==
Sir Thomas Spring was buried on 6 April 1704 in Pakenham parish church. He was succeeded in his title by his only surviving son, Sir William Spring, 4th Baronet (1697–1736), who died unmarried, when the baronetcy, but not his estates, passed to his uncle Sir John Spring, 5th Baronet (1674–1740).

Political offices
Preceded by Daniel Browning	High Sheriff of Suffolk; 1696	Succeeded by John Pack
Baronetage of England
Preceded by William Spring	Baronet (of Pakenham); 1684–1704	Succeeded by William Spring
