= John Symonds (academic) =

English academic

John Symonds (23 January 1730 – 18 February 1807) was an English academic, who became professor of modern history at the University of Cambridge.

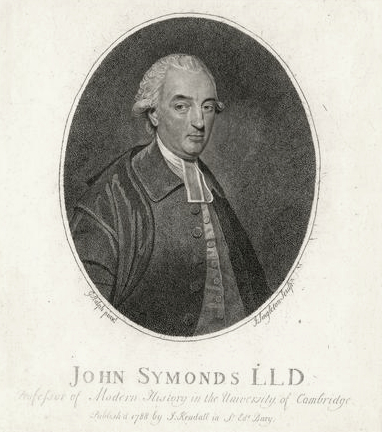
John Symonds, 1788 engraving by John Singleton after George Keith Ralph

== Biography ==
Born at Horringer, Suffolk, he was the eldest son of Rev. John Symonds (died 1757), rector of the parish, by his wife, Mary Spring (died 1774), daughter of Sir Thomas Spring, 3rd Baronet of Pakenham and Hon. Merelina Jermyn, daughter of Thomas Jermyn, 2nd Baron Jermyn. His younger brother was British Naval Captain Thomas Symonds, who was the father of Admiral Sir William Symonds. John inherited the family estates while his brother went to sea.

Symonds was educated at St John's College, Cambridge, graduating B.A. in 1752. In 1753, he was elected a fellow of Peterhouse, and he proceeded M.A. in 1754. He was admitted to the Middle Temple in 1747, and was called to the bar in 1756.

In 1771, Symonds was appointed Regius Professor of Modern History on the death of Thomas Gray and in the following year he was created LL.D. by royal mandate and migrated to Trinity College. He died, unmarried, on 18 February 1807, at Bury St Edmunds, where he acted as recorder, and was buried at Pakenham, Suffolk.

In his will, Symonds gave directions for the donation of books to the Historical Library at Cambridge. He is regarded as the founder of the library.

== Works ==
Symonds was the author of:

- Remarks on an Essay on the History of Colonisation (on a work by William Barron), London, 1778
- The Expediency of revising the Present Edition of the Gospels and Acts of the Apostles, Cambridge, 1789
- The Expediency of revising the Epistles, Cambridge, 1794

He also contributed to Arthur Young's Annals of Agriculture.
