= Pakenham Hall =

Pakenham Hall may refer to:

- Pakenham Hall, County Westmeath or Pakenham Hall Castle, the former name of Tullynally Castle
- Pakenham Hall, Suffolk
