= House of Newe =

House of Newe may refer to:

- Castle Newe, whose coach-house is known as 'House of Newe', Aberdeenshire
- Newe House, Suffolk
