= Pakenham Windmill =

Windmill in Pakenham, Suffolk, England

Pakenham Mill
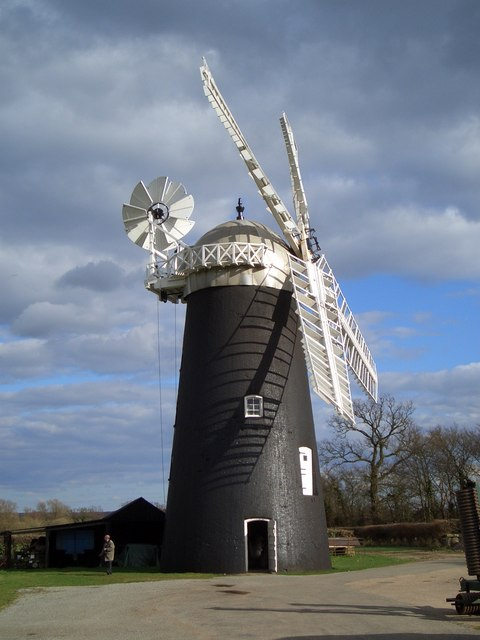
- The restored mill

Origin
- Mill location: TL 931 694
- Coordinates: 52°17′19″N 0°49′56″E
- Operator(s): Friends of Pakenham Windmill
- Year built: 1831

Information
- Purpose: Corn mill
- Type: Tower mill
- Storeys: Five storeys
- No. of sails: Four Sails
- Type of sails: Patent sails
- Winding: Fantail
- Fantail blades: Eight Blades
- Auxiliary power: Steam engine
- No. of pairs of millstones: Three pairs

Pakenham Mill is a Grade II* listed tower mill at Pakenham, Suffolk, England which has been restored and is maintained in working order.

== History ==
Pakenham Mill was built in 1831. Clement Goodrich was the miller in 1846, when he took on an apprentice. The mill came into the ownership of the Bryant family in 1885. A steam engine was used as auxiliary power. In 1947, the mill was nearly tail-winded, but the miller managed to turn the cap in time to avoid this happening. The mill was restored in 1950, with a new weatherbeam fitted by Amos Clarke, the Ipswich millwright. At this time the swing-pot neck bearing from Buxhall mill was installed. A second-hand stock from Thurston post mill was fitted at this time and a gallery constructed around the cap. The gallery was based on that at Wendover mill, Buckinghamshire. New sails were also fitted.

Further restoration took place in 1961, aided by grants from Suffolk County Council, the Ministry of Works. The work was conditional on the Bryant family continuing to work the mill. The restoration work was carried out by R Thompson & Sons Ltd, millwrights of Alford, Lincolnshire. The copper covered cap was rebuilt and clad in aluminium for maintenance reasons. A new stock and two new sails were made, and the fantail rebuilt. The mill was struck by lightning in June 1971, a stock being split and a sail damaged. The sack chain saved the mill from being burnt down by giving a route for the lightning to earth. When the mill was repaired, a lightning conductor was added to the mill.

The most recent restoration of Pakenham windmill was completed in May 2000. The £60,000 cost of the work was 80% funded by the Heritage Lottery Fund. The work was carried out by Thompson's of Alford.

== Description ==
Pakenham Mill is a five storey tower mill. It has a domed cap with a gallery and is winded by a fantail. Two of the three pairs of millstones remain. The governors for the millstones are driven by chains instead of the more usual belt.

== Millers ==
- Clement Goodrich 1846
- Bryant 1885 -
- John Bryant - 1947

== Public access ==
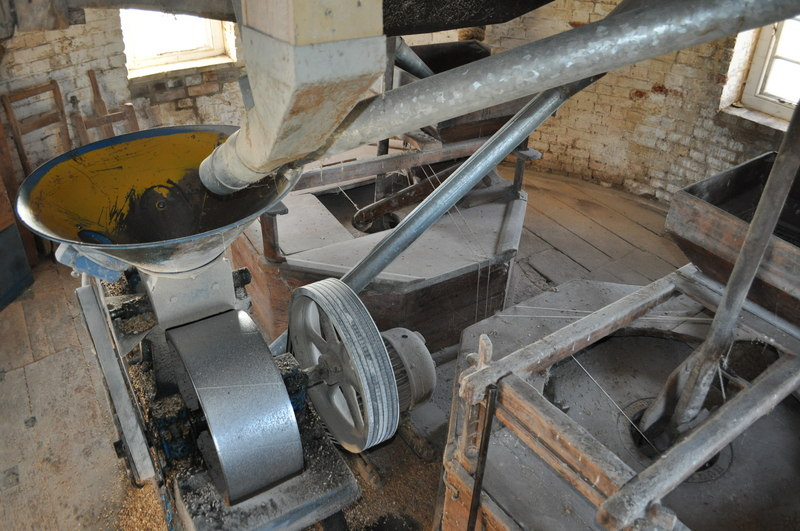
The mill stones

The mill is open to the public daily "during working hours" for individuals, and by appointment for parties. It is open on both Saturday and Sunday of National Mills Weekend from 14:00 to 17:30.

== Culture and media ==
- Pakenham windmill appeared in the short film And now they rest released in 1938.
- Pakenham windmill appeared in a short film used by the BBC in the 1950s for interludes between programmes.
- Pakenham windmill appeared in The Peacemaker, the seventh episode of the third series of Survivors made in 1977 for television.
