= Greene baronets of Nether Hall (1900) =

Greene baronets
- Escutcheon of the Greene baronets of Nether Hall
- Creation date: 1900
- Status: extinct
- Extinction date: 1966
- Motto: Non Sine Numine, Not without divine will
- Arms: Argent on a cross indented Gules two annulets interlaced between four crescents Or a chief Azure thereon between two bezants a pale of the third charged with a crescent of the fourth.
- Crest: In front of an eagle's head erased Or holding in the beak a sprig of three trefoils slipped Vert two annulets interlaced Azure between as many bezants.

The Greene baronetcy, of Nether Hall in the Parish of Thurston in the County of Suffolk, was created in the Baronetage of the United Kingdom on 21 June 1900 for Edward Greene. A brewer and politician. He was Member of Parliament for Bury St Edmunds from 1900 to 1906., he was the son of Edward Greene, Member of Parliament for Bury St Edmunds and Stowmarket, and the grandson of Benjamin Greene of the Greene King Brewery.

His eldest surviving son, the 2nd Baronet, represented Chesterton in Parliament from 1895 to 1906, and Hackney North from 1910 to 1923. The title became extinct on the death of the latter's younger brother, the 3rd Baronet, in 1966.

== Greene baronets, of Nether Hall (1900) ==
- Sir Edward Walter Greene, 1st Baronet (1842–1920)
- Sir (Walter) Raymond Greene, DSO, 2nd Baronet (1869–1947)
- Sir Edward Allan Greene, MC, 3rd Baronet (1882–1966)

== Notes ==
Baronetage of the United Kingdom
Preceded by Chubb baronets	Greene baronets of Nether Hall; 21 June 1900	Succeeded by Lawson baronets
