= Willamette Valley ponderosa pine =

Population of conifer

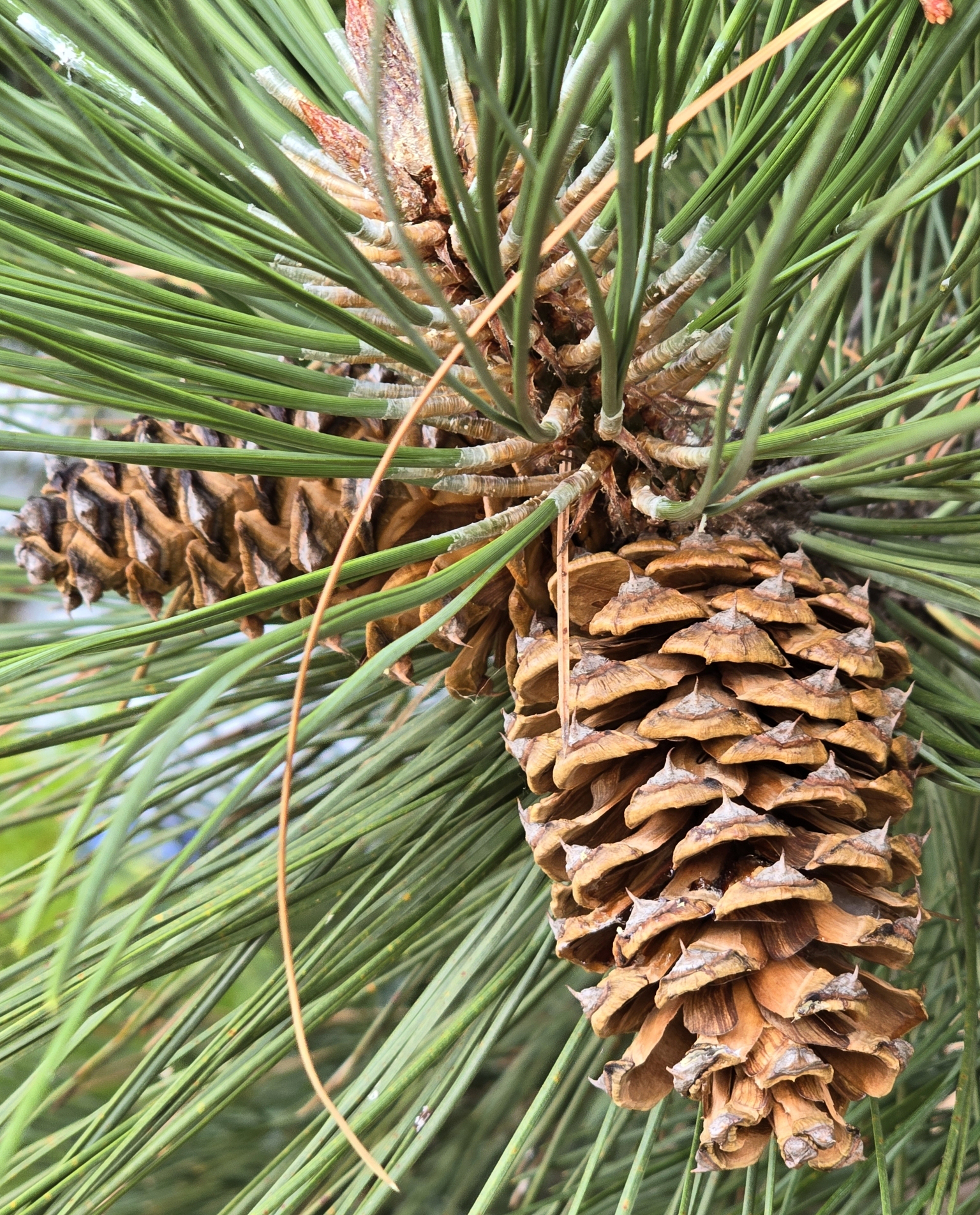
Pinus ponderosa subsp benthamiana foliage and cones at Jennings Lodge in the Willamette Valley, Oregon

The Willamette Valley ponderosa pine is a population of the ponderosa pine (Pinus ponderosa) native to the Willamette Valley in western Oregon. It is adapted to Western Oregon's wet winter and dry summer.

== History ==
The Willamette Valley ponderosa variant only grows on the valley floor, unlike Douglas-fir, which grows on hillsides, and the wood is softer and easier to mill than the native hardwoods. Because of this, when early settlers used wood from the trees to build homes and cleared land for agriculture, the population was "decimated". Prior to restoration efforts, the pine survived only in scattered stands between Hillsboro and Cottage Grove. Both Lewis's woodpecker and slender-billed nuthatch (a subspecies of white-breasted nuthatch) nest in the tree and rely on it for food; their populations were reduced along with that of the pine.

== Taxonomy ==
Populations of Willamette Valley ponderosa pines are sometimes referred to as the separate variety "willamettensis"; however, this name has not been formally published in scientific literature. The population is included within the ponderosa pine subspecies or variety Pinus ponderosa subsp. benthamiana, which occurs from western Washington south through western Oregon to the Coast Ranges and Sierra Nevada of California.
