= Greene baronets =

Set index for Greene baronets

There have been two baronetcies created for persons with the surname Greene, one in the Baronetage of England and one in the Baronetage of the United Kingdom. Both creations are extinct.

- Greene baronets of Mitcham (1664)
- Greene baronets of Nether Hall (1900)

== See also ==
- Green baronets
