= John Macky =

Scottish spy and writer (died 1726)

John Macky (died 1726) was a Scottish spy and travel writer. Between 1688 and 1710 he ran a successful intelligence gathering network across the English Channel, principally concerned with Jacobite and French threats to England. He was also the author of several publications which reflected his travel, political outlook and access to leading figures of the period.

== Biography ==
Nothing is known of Macky's parentage or early life. Following the Glorious Revolution of 1688, Macky was sent to France by the English government to provide information about Jacobite activity. He successfully infiltrated the Jacobite court at the Château de Saint-Germain-en-Laye. In 1692, he was the first person to inform the authorities of the exiled James II's intended invasion of England after the former king had fled to France from England. In October 1693 he was made inspector of the coast from Harwich to Dover, tasked with intercepting hostile communications and intelligence. With the re-establishment of postal services to France following the Peace of Ryswick, on 1 January 1698 Macky was placed in charge of the packet boats and royal express service from Dover to Calais, Ostend, and Nieuwpoort.

In 1696 he discovered information related to the 1696 Jacobite assassination plot and after its disclosure he published an attack on James II's exiled court in A View of the Court of St Germains from the Year 1690 to 1695. In England, he became familiar with the leading figures at the courts of William III and Queen Anne. His access was such that he was able to make an extensive list of many courtiers' characteristics, family connections, treatment by the monarch and personal foibles.

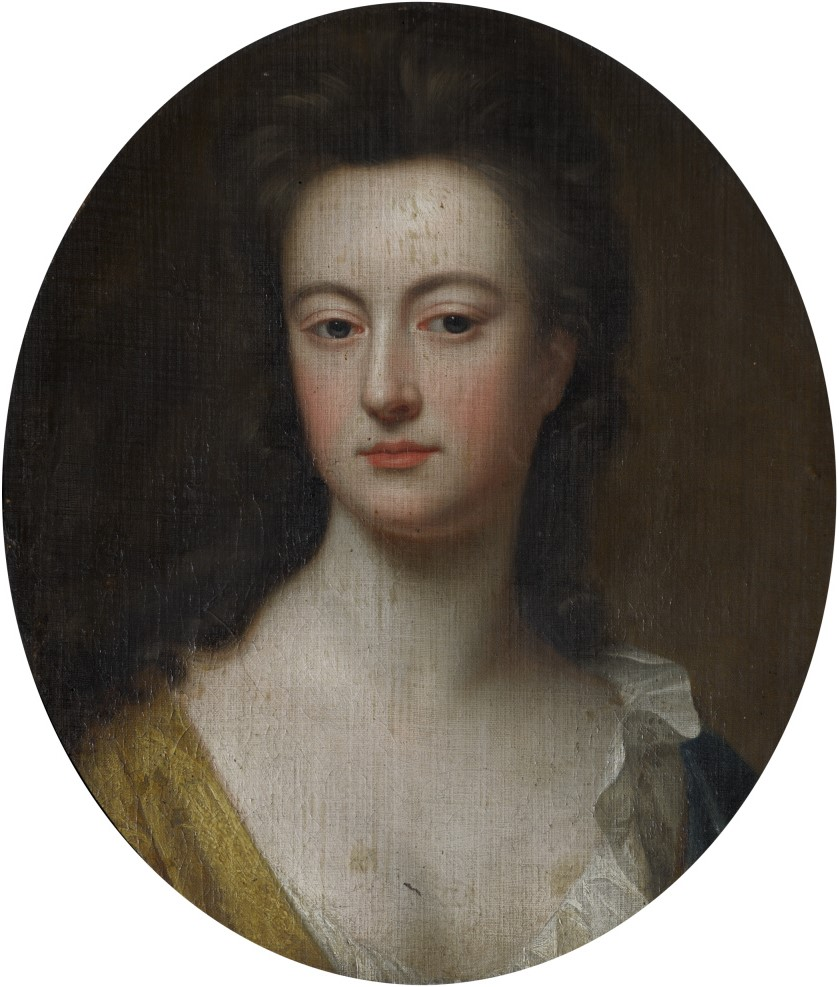
Sarah Spring, daughter of Sir William Spring and wife of John Macky. Macky used the fortune from her dowry to fund his espionage activity

In August 1702, the General Post Office terminated the cross-channel postal service with the beginning of the War of the Spanish Succession and Macky was awarded a pension at half pay. Shortly afterwards he went to look after an estate on Zakynthos which had been bequeathed in part to him by his deceased wife. On the way he unsuccessfully sought an audience with Sophia of Hanover. He appears to have returned to England before the end of 1705.

Following the Battle of Ramillies in 1706, Macky was given direction of the packet boats to Ostend by the Earl of Godolphin. Aligned with the politics of the Whig faction, in 1708 he came into the pay of Robert Walpole. He speedily re-established an espionage network for surveillance of Jacobites and French naval and privateering activity at Dunkirk. Macky's network of spies was crucial to the discovery in February and March 1708 of the Jacobite plans to invade Scotland and that year he also discovered the preparations for an armament at Dunkirk. The loss of his Post Office contract in 1713 exposed Macky's extensive indebtedness, and he fled in that year to Flanders to escape his creditors. Appeals by him to enter the service of Robert Harley went unheeded.

He subsequently came under the suspicion of the authorities owing to his large debts and close connection with many Jacobites and was imprisoned, but was released in 1714 following the accession of George I. He found some support from the new Whig ministry and he served as Director of the Packet Boats at Dover, using the dowry from his marriage to fund the construction of five boats. The operation proved too costly and faced with mounting debts, Macky turned to travel writing, producing his first volume in 1714. This was frequently reprinted, and was followed by a second volume in 1722, a third in 1723 and a fourth in 1725. The writings established for Macky a minor literary reputation, although he was best known to contemporaries for his writings on the English and French courts. In 1722 he was sent to a debtors' prison, but was soon released on the orders of the Earl of Sunderland. Between 1723 and 1725 he briefly resumed his career in espionage in the wake of the Atterbury Plot. He died in Rotterdam in 1726.

=== Marriage, issue and legacy ===
Macky married Sarah Spring (1675–1698), the only daughter of Sir William Spring, 2nd Baronet and Sarah, daughter of Sir Robert Cordell, 1st Baronet. In 1733 their son, Spring Macky, published Memoirs of the Secret Services of John Macky. The memoirs contain extensive biographies and descriptions of important political figures of the period, providing an early written example of extensive surveillance. Notes to the memoirs were appended by Jonathan Swift prior to publication.

== Publications ==
- A View of the Court of St Germains from the Year 1690 to 1695 (1696)
- A Journey through England, Volume I (1714) and Volume II (1722)
- A Journey through Scotland, Volume III (1723), reprinted, with annotations and an introduction by Anne M. McKim, by The Grimsay Press (2014) ISBN 9781845301460
- A Journey through the Austrian Netherlands, Volume IV (1725)
- Memoirs of the secret services of John Macky (1733)
