= Lawson baronets of Weetwood Grange (1900) =

Escutcheon of the Lawson baronets of Weetwood Grange

The Lawson baronetcy, of Weetwood Grange in Headingley-cum-Burley in the West Riding of the County of York, was created in the Baronetage of the United Kingdom on 12 July 1900 for Arthur Lawson, chairman of Fairbairn Lawson Combe Barbour Ltd, and a director of the Great Eastern Railway and the Yorkshire Post.

The 2nd Baronet was also chairman of Fairbairn, Lawson, Combe-Barbour Ltd. The 3rd Baronet was a colonel in the Royal Hussars.

== Lawson baronets, of Weetwood Grange (1900) ==
- Sir Arthur Tredgold Lawson, 1st Baronet (1844–1915)
- Sir Digby Lawson, 2nd Baronet (1880–1959)
- Sir John Charles Arthur Digby Lawson, DSO, MC, 3rd Baronet (1912–2001)
- Sir Charles John Patrick Lawson, 4th Baronet (born 1959). Married Lady Caroline Lowther, daughter of James Lowther, 7th Earl of Lonsdale, on 18 September 1987, one daughter and three sons.

The heir apparent to the baronetcy is Jack William Tremayne Lawson (born 1989), eldest son of the 4th Baronet.

== Notes ==
Baronetage of the United Kingdom
| Preceded by Greene baronets | Lawson baronets of Weetwood Grange; 12 July 1900 | Succeeded by Wrightson baronets |
