= Pakenham Hall, Suffolk =

Manor house in Suffolk, England

Pakenham Hall was a manor house in Pakenham, Suffolk, the capital residence of Pakenham manor. It was demolished and replaced by a more modern house, now called Pakenham Old Hall, in 1900. It was the family seat of the Spring family between 1545 and 1735, and then of the Barons Calthorpe.

The manor was originally in the possession of Theodred, Bishop of London before being granted to Bury St Edmunds Abbey by Edward the Confessor in 1042. In the reign of Edward I the manor was held by the Pakenham family, later Earls of Longford. It subsequently reverted to the Church and remained in the possession of the abbey until the Dissolution of the Monasteries when it was seized by The Crown. The manor was purchased from the Crown by Robert Spring, the son of Thomas Spring of Lavenham, on 27 September 1545 for £1,432. Upon its inheritance by Sir William Spring the manor became the principle family seat of the Spring family, who rebuilt the house in the Tudor style. In the hearth tax returns of 1672 Pakenham Hall was owned by Sir William Spring, 2nd Baronet and is recorded as having had 23 hearths, demonstrating that the house was of considerable size. At this stage, the estate of the Hall covered 1200 acres of prime agricultural land.

Upon the death of Sir William Spring, 4th Baronet in 1735 the Hall and estate, valued at £1,500 a year, were inherited by his sisters, Merielina, wife of Thomas Discipline Esq, and Mary. The smaller dower house of Newe House remained in the Spring family until the mid-19th century. In 1748 the whole Pakenham Hall estate was owned by Thomas Discipline and in 1786 it was sold to Sir Henry Gough, 2nd Baronet, later Baron Calthorpe. The Gough-Calthorpe family demolished the old medieval and Tudor hall and replaced it with a more modern mansion of built of white brick and flint in around 1900. The house on the site is currently owned by Nigel Roy Whitwell Esq.
