= Greene baronets of Mitcham (1664) =

Escutcheon of the Greene baronets of Mitcham

The Greene baronetcy, of Mitcham in the County of Surrey, was created in the Baronetage of England on 2 November 1664 for William Greene. The title became extinct on his death in 1671.

Greene fined for Alderman and Sheriff of London. He was granted arms in 1663, ahead of the award of the baronetcy. In 1667 he was High Sheriff of Surrey. He left no male heir, but he had a daughter Gertrude. She married William Peck (died 1694) of Sampford Hall in Essex, who was the son of Edward Peck, serjeant-at-law, and his wife Gertrude Greene. Their son William Peck (bapt. 1678 – 1727) married Bridget Randyll, daughter of Morgan Randyll, and was High Sheriff of Essex in 1705.

== Greene baronets, of Mitcham (1664) ==
- Sir William Greene, 1st Baronet (died 1671)
