= Sir William Spring, 2nd Baronet =

English Member of Parliament for Suffolk

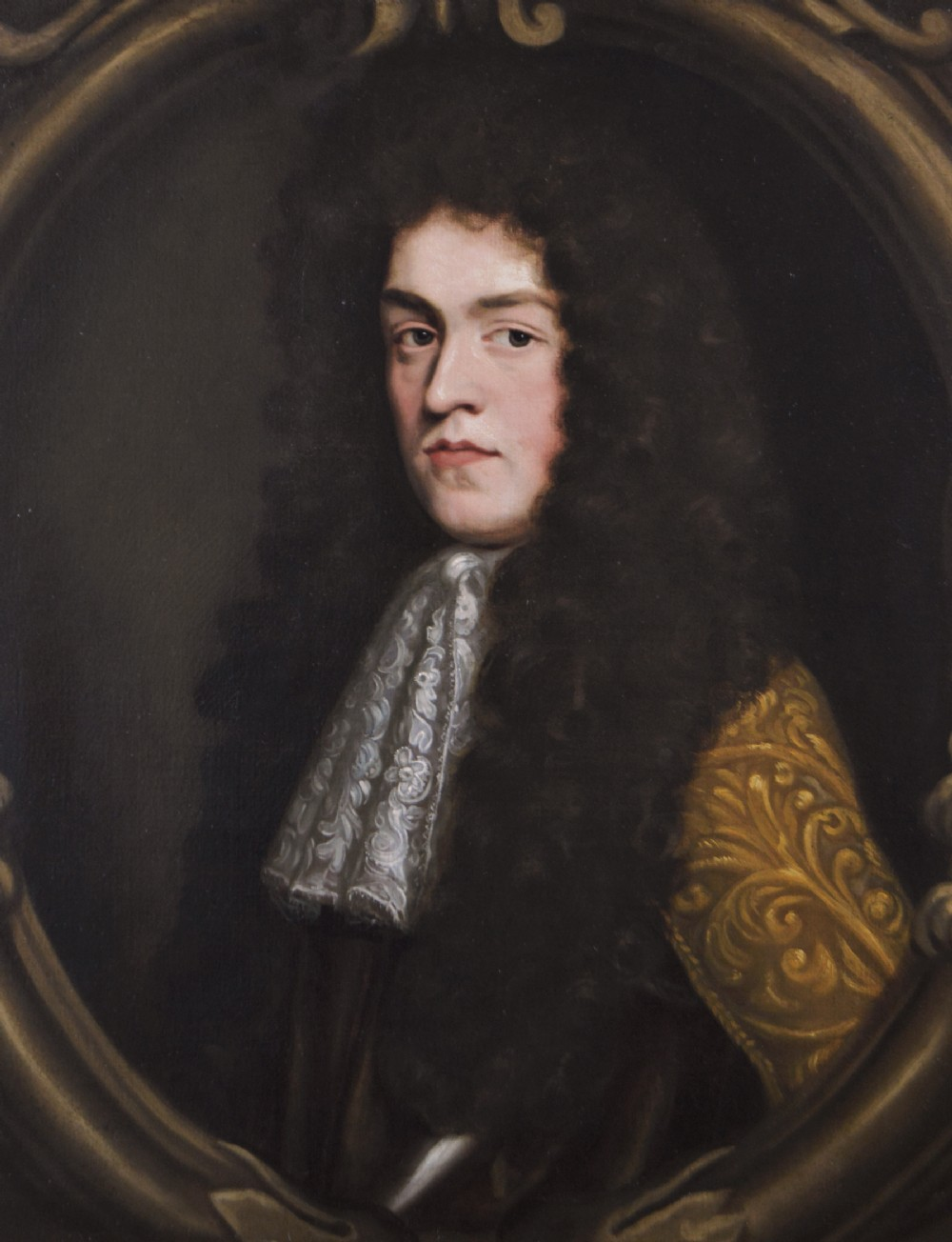
- A portrait of Sir William Spring, Bt by Willem Wissing

Member of Parliament for Suffolk
- In office 1679–1684
- Monarch: Charles II

Personal details
- Born: May 1642
- Died: 30 April 1684 (aged 41)
- Spouse(s): Hon. Mary North (m.1661); Sarah Cordell (m.1667)
- Parent(s): Sir William Spring, 1st Baronet; Elizabeth L'Estrange

Sir William Spring, 2nd Baronet (May 1642 – 30 April 1684) was an English Whig politician who was a Member of Parliament for Suffolk from 1679 until his death in 1684.

== Early life ==
Spring was the son of Sir William Spring, 1st Baronet and Elizabeth L'Estrange, daughter of Alice L'Estrange and Sir Hamon le Strange. He was educated at King Edward VI School and Christ's College, Cambridge, graduating in 1658. In 1654 he inherited his father's baronetcy.

== Career ==
In 1661, Spring was appointed a commissioner for assessment for Suffolk. He was appointed a justice of the peace in 1664, but was removed from the Commission of the Peace for Suffolk in 1670 for opposing the Conventicle Act 1664. He served as High Sheriff of Suffolk in 1674. He contested the Sudbury constituency in 1679, but lost. He was subsequently elected to represent Suffolk in both the second and third Exclusion Parliaments as an exclusionist. The Earl of Shaftesbury classed him as an "honest" opponent of James, Duke of York inheriting the throne.

Although he moved away from his father's Puritan beliefs, Spring opposed the increasing Catholicisation of the Church of England over his lifetime. On 14 February 1681, after he and Sir Samuel Barnardiston had been unanimously elected, an address was presented to them from the freeholders of the constituency, thanking them for their "zeal for the Protestant religion, your loyalty to his Majesty’s person and government, and your endeavours for the preservation of our laws, rights and liberties" and urging them to continue their support of exclusion. He made no recorded speeches and was not appointed to any committees in either of the exclusion parliaments. He died in 1684 and was buried in Pakenham, Suffolk.

== Marriages and children ==
Spring was married twice. On 11 October 1661, he first married Mary, daughter of Dudley North, 4th Baron North; they had no children. On 3 February 1667, he married secondly Sarah, daughter of Sir Robert Cordell, 1st Baronet of Melford Hall, Suffolk and together they had three children:

1. Sir Thomas Spring, 3rd Baronet, married Merolina, daughter and co-heiress of Thomas Jermyn, 2nd Baron Jermyn and heiress of the Jacobite Earl of Dover.
2. Sir John Spring, 5th Baronet, married Elizabeth Nightingale.
3. Sarah Spring, married John Macky.

== Ancestry ==
Ancestors of Sir William Spring, 2nd Baronet

128. Thomas Spring
64. Thomas Spring of Lavenham
129. Margaret Appleton
32. Sir John Spring of Lavenham
65. Anne King
16. Sir William Spring of Lavenham
33. Dorothy Waldegrave
8. John Spring
34. Sir Thomas Kyston
17. Anne Kytson
35. Margaret Donnington
4. Sir William Spring of Ridenhall
18. Sir John Trelawny of Poole in Menhenniot, Cornwall
9. Mary Trelawny
2. Sir William Spring, 1st Baronet
10. Sir William Smith
5. Elizabeth Smith
11. Elizabeth Smith
1. Sir William Spring, 2nd Baronet
24. Sir Thomas L'Estrange
12. Sir Nicholas L'Estrange
6. Sir Hamon L'Estrange
13. Mary Bell
3. Elizabeth L'Estrange
14. Richard Stubb
7. Anne Stubb

Parliament of England
| Preceded by Sir Gervase Elwes, Bt; Sir Samuel Barnardiston, Bt | Member of Parliament for Suffolk; 1679–1684; With: Sir Samuel Barnardiston, Bt | Succeeded by Sir Robert Broke, Bt; Sir Henry North, Bt |
Baronetage of England
| Preceded by William Spring | Baronet (of Pakenham); 1654–1684 | Succeeded by Thomas Spring |
