= Charles Lawson (nurseryman) =

Scottish nurseryman and merchant (1795–1873)

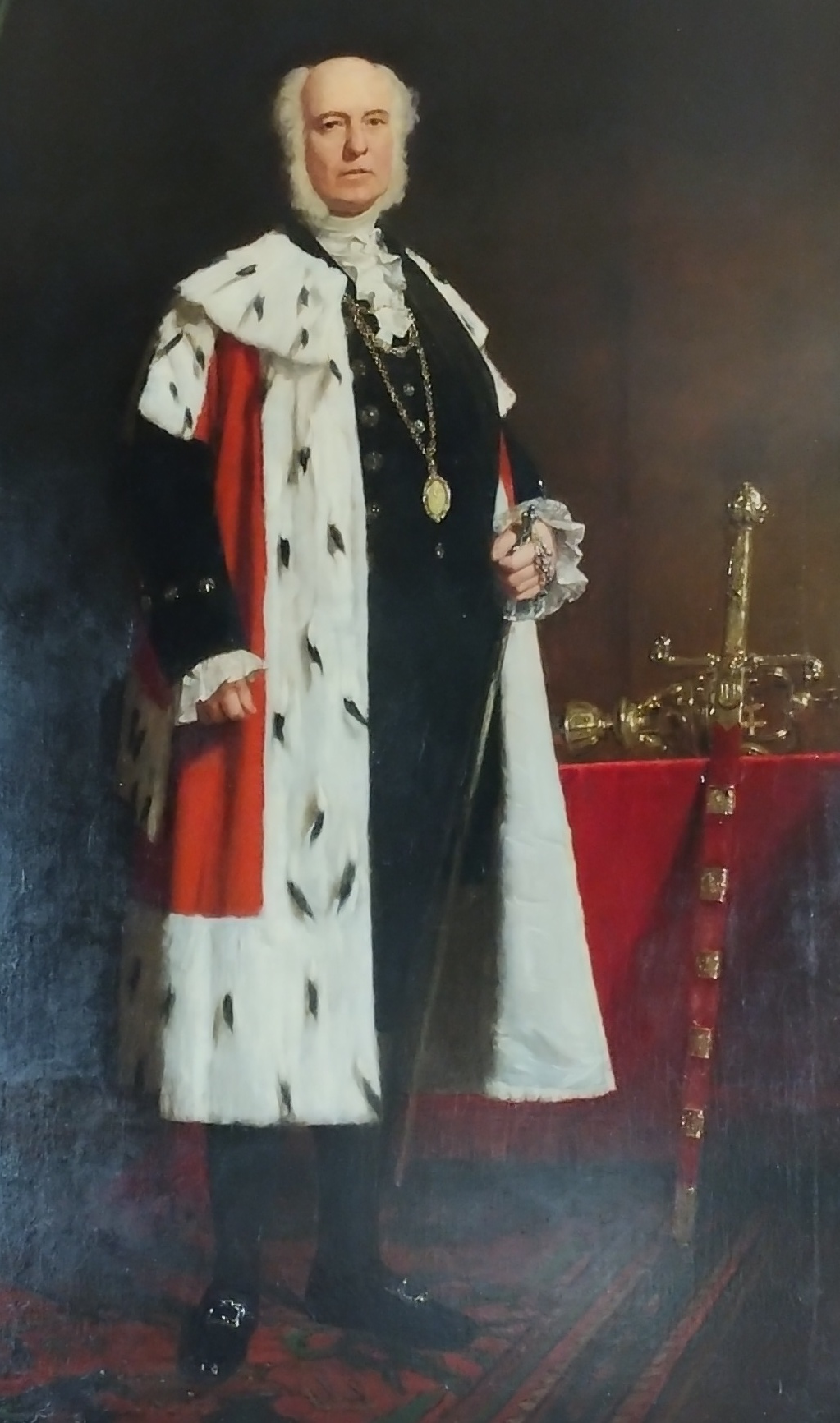
- A portrait of Lawson by John Graham-Gilbert
- Born: 1795; Edinburgh
- Died: 1873 (aged 77–78)
- Education: Edinburgh High School; Edinburgh University
- Occupations: Nurseryman, merchant
- Spouse: Patricia Grant
- Parents: Peter Lawson (father); Patricia Grant (mother)

Charles Lawson (1795–1873) was a Scottish nurseryman and merchant, noted for the introduction of foreign crops into the United Kingdom. He served as Lord Provost of Edinburgh from 1862 to 1865.

== Life ==
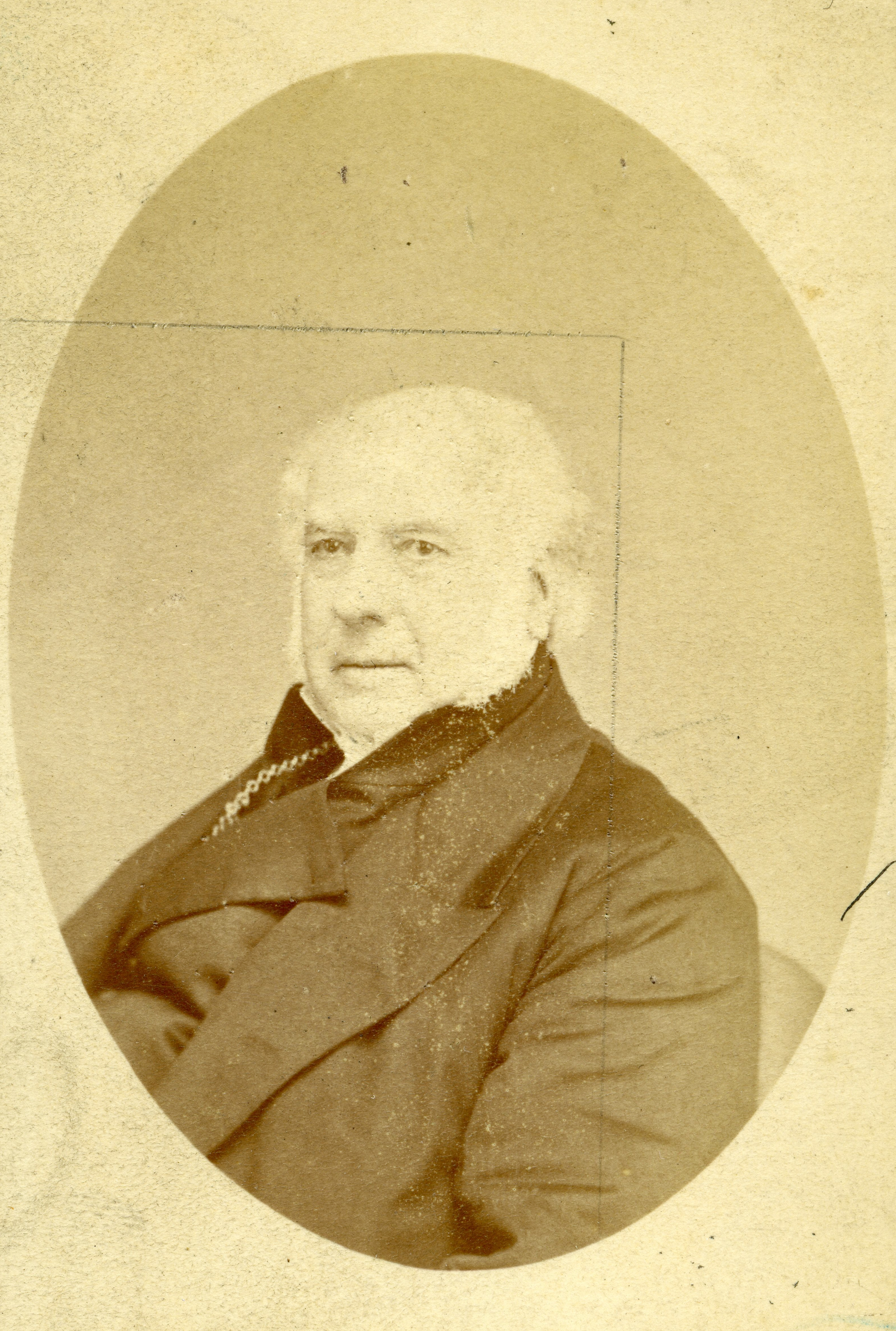
c. 1862

Lawson was born in Edinburgh, son of the seed merchant Peter Lawson and his wife Patricia Grant. The family lived at 19 Blair Street, a street joining the Royal Mile to the Cowgate. He was educated at Edinburgh High School and Edinburgh University. His father died in 1821, and Charles then took over the family business Peter Lawson & Son.

In Edinburgh he lived at 35 George Square. In 1851, he purchased Borthwick Hall near Gorebridge.

Lawson was connected to the huge Lawson-Donaldson Seed Warehouse off the Shore in Leith.

Successful on a national scale, Lawson became a specialist in grass seeds and conifers. The Cupressus lawsoniana was named after him.

Lawson died in 1873.

== Artistic depictions ==
Lawson was portrayed in office by John Graham-Gilbert.
