= Newe House =

House in Pakenham, Suffolk, England

Coordinates: 52.2695°N 0.8287°E

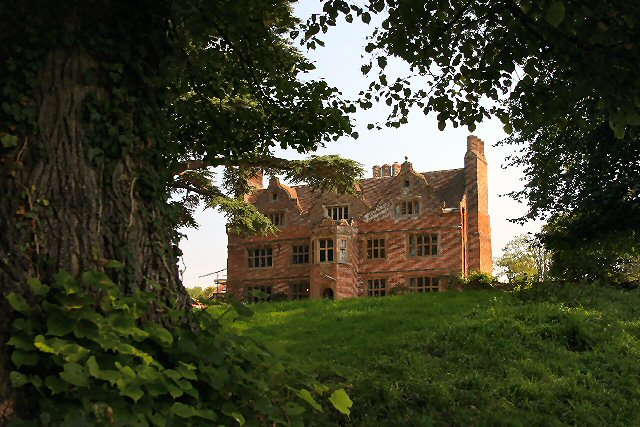
Newe House, Pakenham

Newe House is a Grade II* listed Jacobean dower house in the village of Pakenham, Suffolk.

Newe House was built in 1622 by Sir Robert Bright and today the façade of the house remains largely unmodified. Sir Robert had bought the land surrounding Pakenham from the Bacon family several years before. In the late 1640s it was sold to Sir William Spring, who had been a prominent Parliamentarian during the Civil War. The house remained in the Spring family until the mid-nineteenth century, being used as the family dower house. The Spring family coat-of-arms is still apparent above the main door to the manor.

Newe House has been extensively restored by its current owners whose family have owned it since 1947.

== See also ==
- Spring family
