= Pakenham, Suffolk =

Village in Suffolk, England

Coordinates: 52.270°N 0.818°E

Pakenham
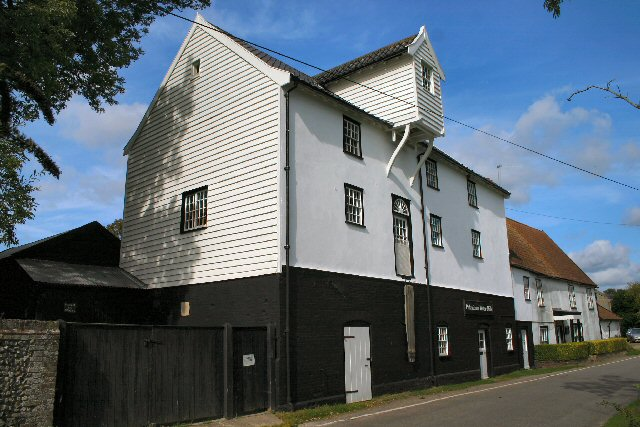
- Pakenham Water Mill

- Location within Suffolk
- Population: 922 (2011)
- OS grid reference: TL924673
- District: West Suffolk
- Shire county: Suffolk
- Region: East
- Country: England
- Sovereign state: United Kingdom
- Post town: Bury St Edmunds
- Postcode district: IP31
- Dialling code: 01359
- UK Parliament: Bury St Edmunds and Stowmarket

Pakenham is a village and civil parish in the West Suffolk district of Suffolk in eastern England. Its name can be linked to Anglo-Saxon roots, Pacca being the founder of a settlement on the hill surrounding Pakenham church. The village describes itself as the "Village of Two Mills", as it has a water mill which claims to be the only working example in the county. Pakenham Windmill has been restored and is maintained in working order.

The village sits to the east of Bury St. Edmunds. From 1974 to 2019 it was administered as part of the borough of St Edmundsbury. Prior to the local government reorganisation of 1974 it was part of Thingoe Rural District.

== History ==
Pacca was the founder of a settlement on the hill where Pakenham church now sits, on an area higher than the waters of Pakenham Fen. The discovery of many Anglo-Saxon remains, notably that of a bone-toothed comb in the old school garden (near the church) in the 1950s, testify to the authenticity of the site. The village was therefore named Pacca's Ham, i.e. the home of Pacca.

This name eventually became Pakenham (pronounced locally with a long "a" sound). The Anglo-Saxon family name later became "de Pakenham". Pacca's descendants continued to farm here until the Norman Conquest of 1066.

The village has contained several manor houses, such as Pakenham Hall the family seat of the Spring family, but has now been demolished. Nether Hall was the original home of the de Pakenham family, and later seat of the Greene baronets. Newe House was built by Sir Robert Bright before becoming the dower house of the Spring family. Several members of the Spring family are buried in the parish church of St Mary which dates from ca. 1100.

== Folklore ==
Towards the end of the nineteenth century 'a house near Pakenham was said to be persistently disturbed by strange noises and the sound of footsteps.' Lady Gurdon gives, in 1893, meanwhile, an account of a local carter encountering a phantom funeral procession.

== Notable residents ==
- Hamon L'Estrange (1605 – 1660), writer on history, theology and liturgy who is buried at Pakenham.
- Joanne Jennings (1969- ), high jumper who competed for Great Britain twice at the Summer Olympics and won silver at the 1998 Commonwealth Games.
- Thomas Thornhill (1837-1900), baronet, High Sheriff of Suffolk in 1860, Conservative politician, and Member of Parliament (MP) for the Western division of Suffolk at a by-election in October 1875, and held the seat until the constituency was abolished at the 1885 general election.

== Gallery ==
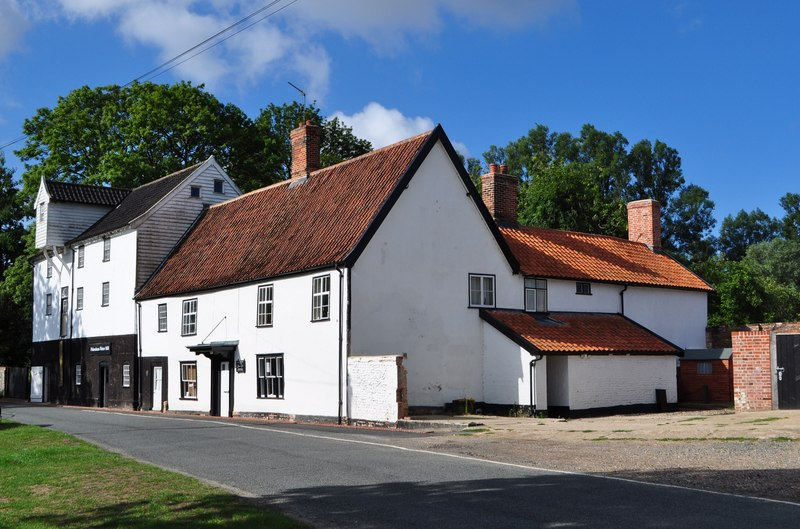
The Watermill from Mill Road

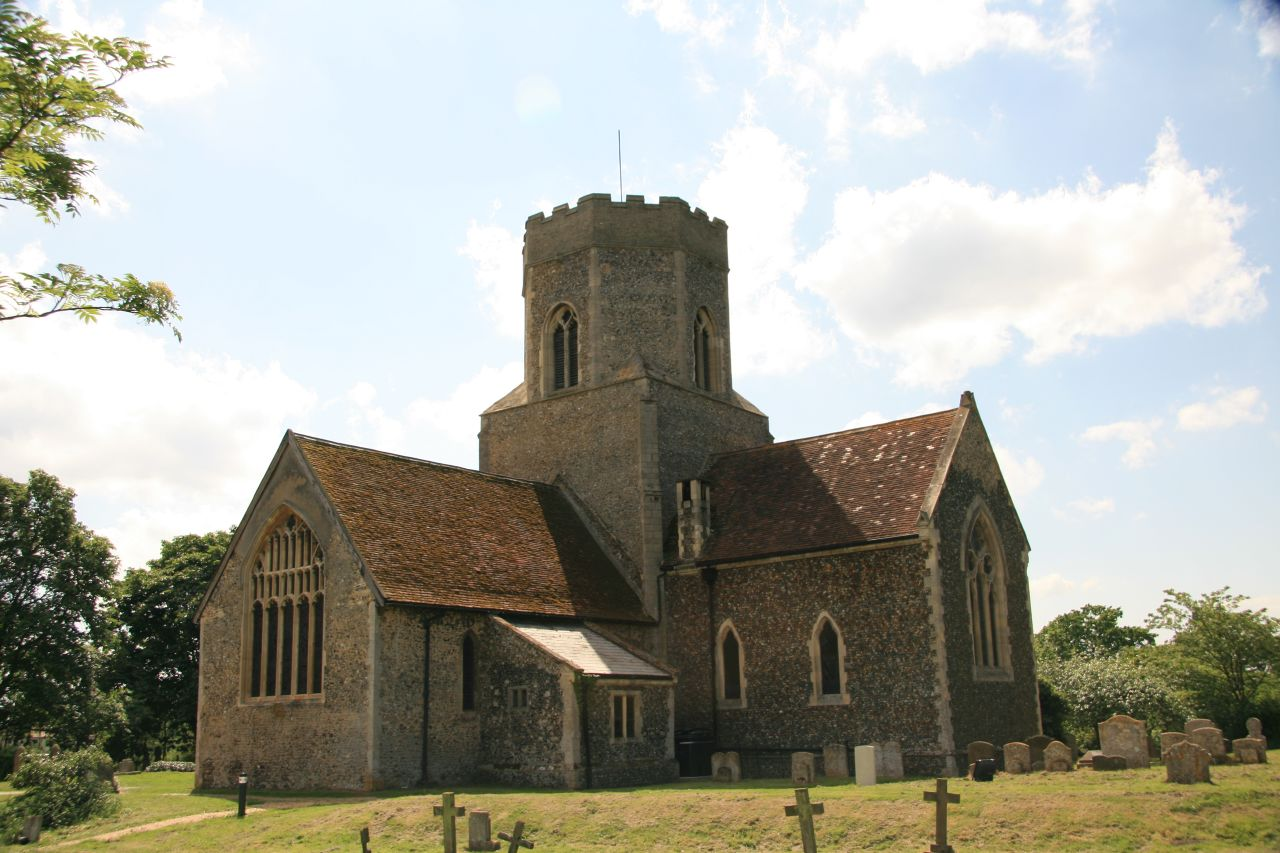
View of St Mary's Church

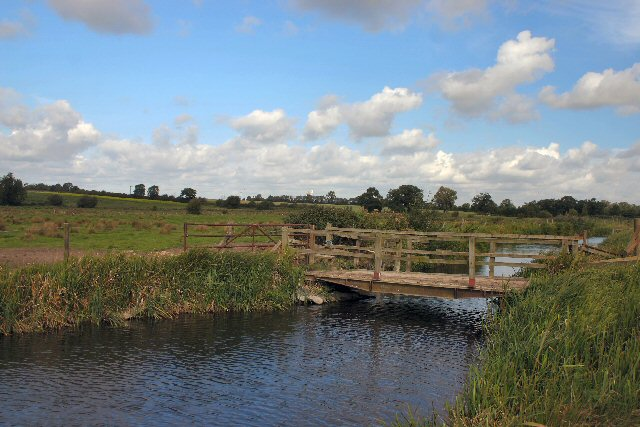
Footbridge over Pakenham Fen

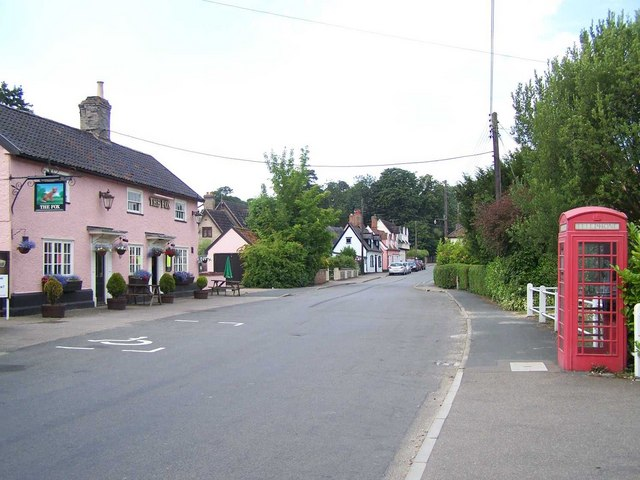
View of the main street

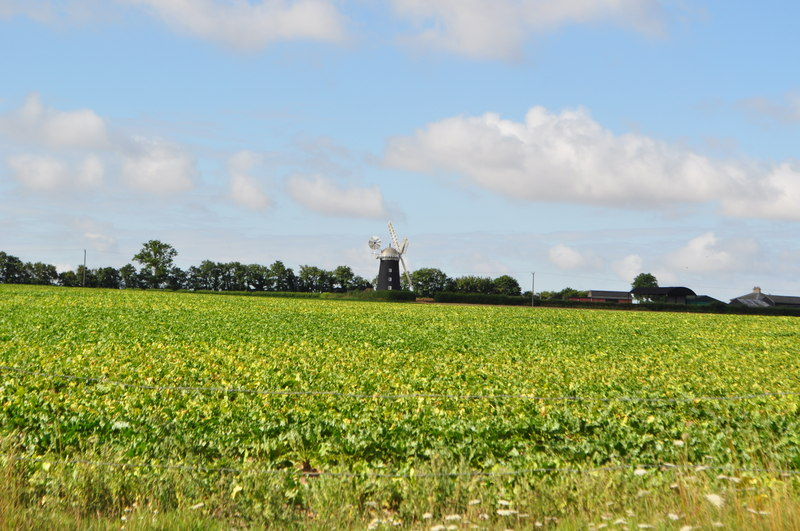
Pakenham tower windmill across the field

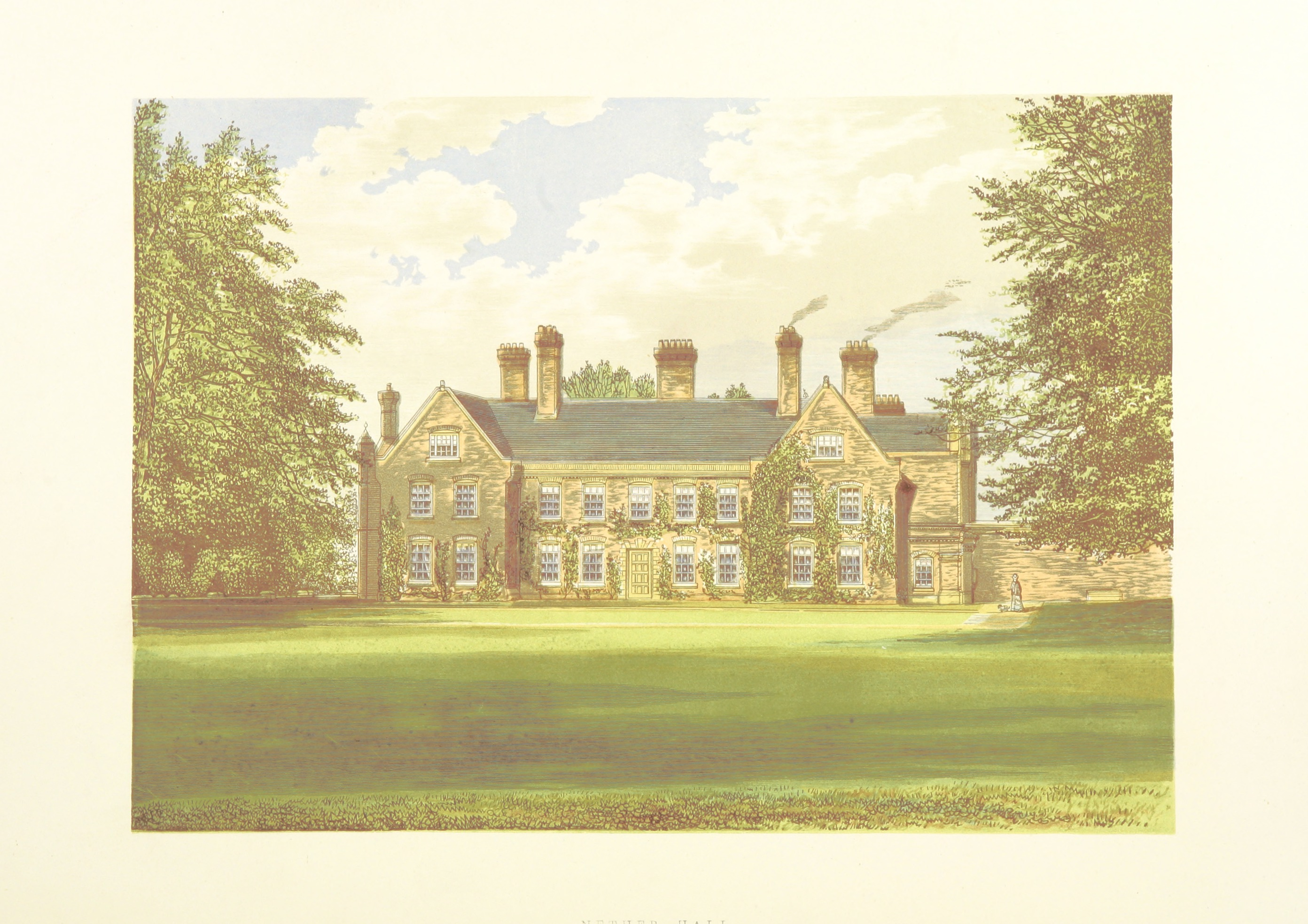
Nether Hall by Francis Orpen Morris (1866)

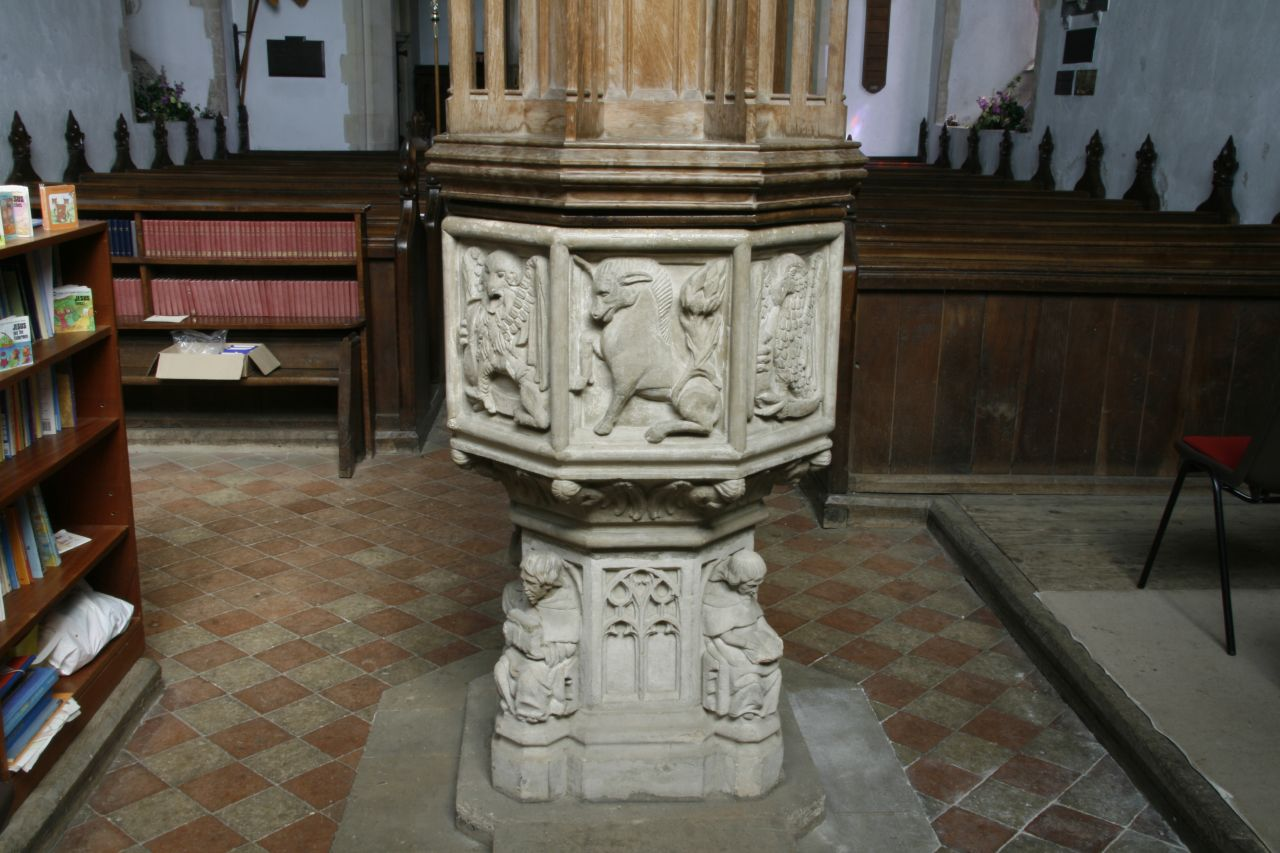
St Mary's Church inside

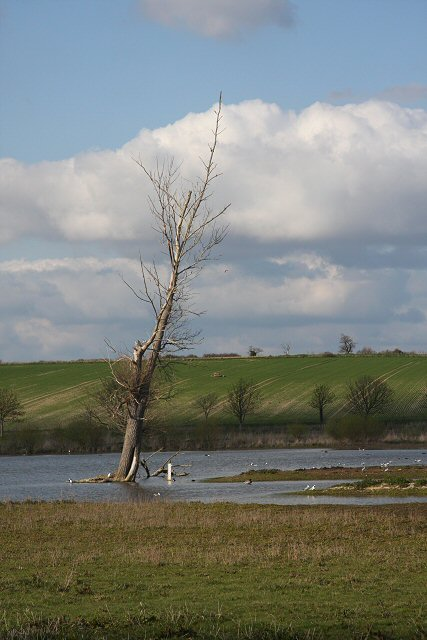
The mere viewed from the watermill

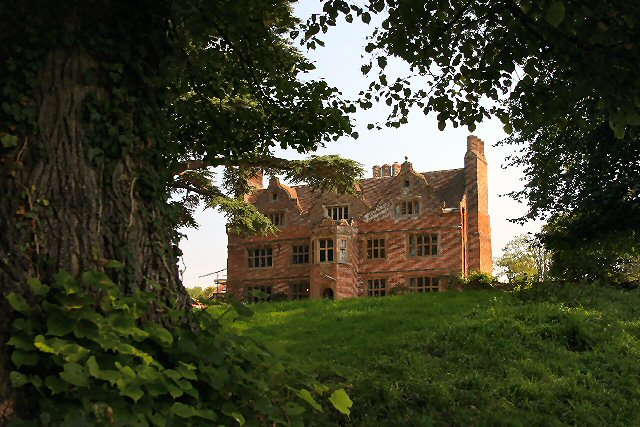
Newe House

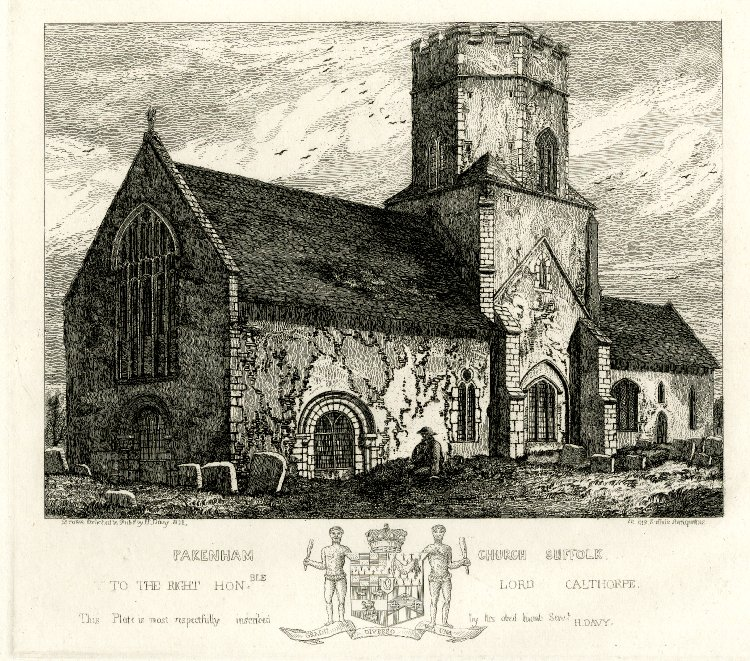
Pakenham Church by Henry Davy (1827)

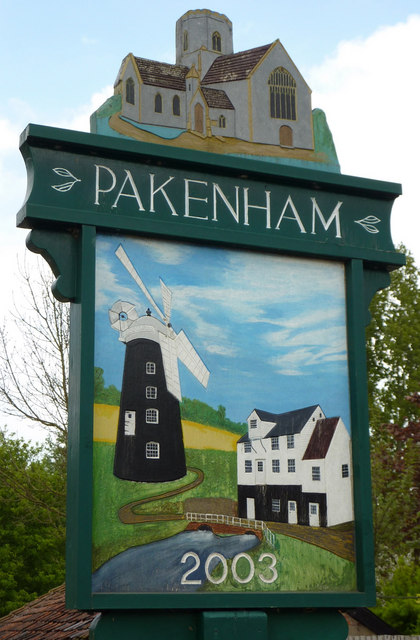
Village sign

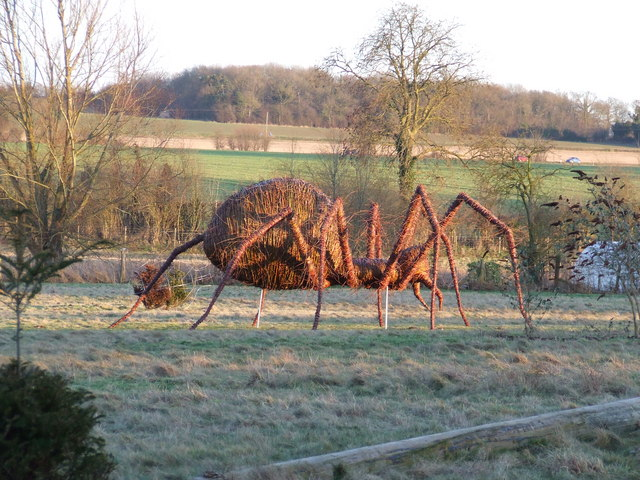
Topiaries by a local artist

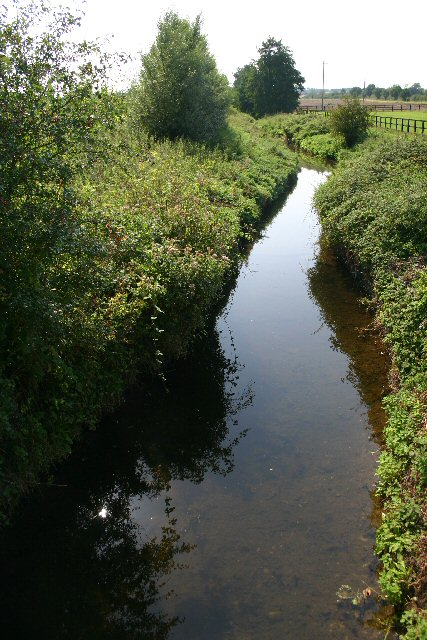
River Black Bourn at Bull Bridge

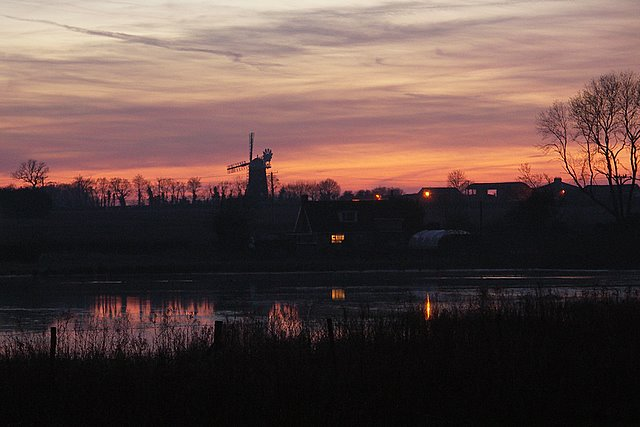
Windmill as seen from Micklemere

== See also ==
- Pakenham Windmill
