= Felton family =

British noble family

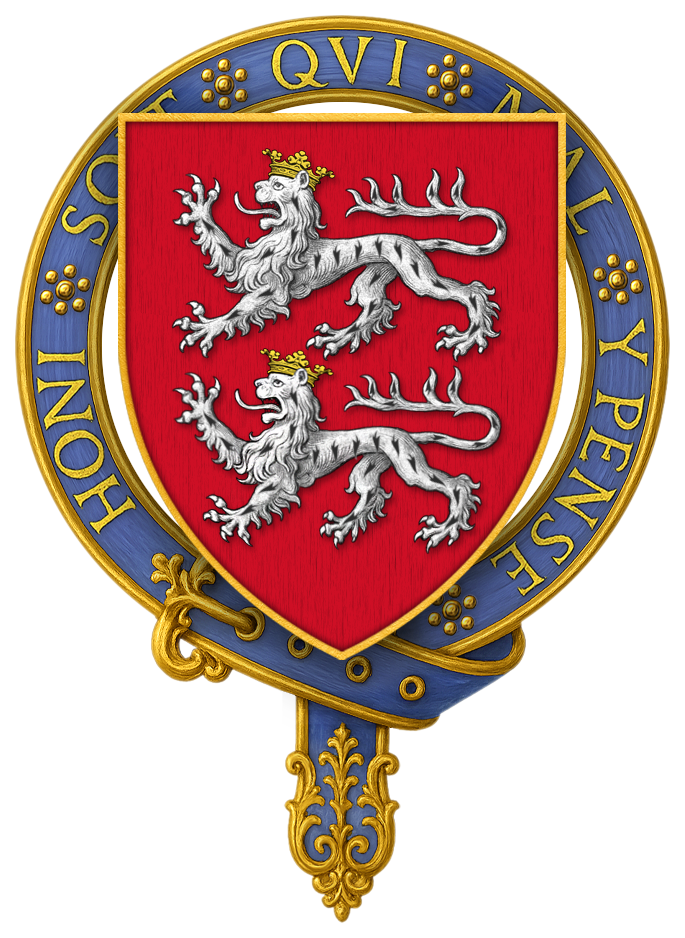
Coat of Arms of Sir Thomas Felton, KG: Gules, two lions passant in pale ermine, crowned or.

The Felton family, also known as de Feltone, is a minor Anglo-Norman noble dynasty, originating in Northumberland, near the village of Felton. Many of its members served as seneschals and castellans throughout the Medieval period, from the Norman Conquest onward. The Feltons had numerous peerages and titles throughout the centuries, most recently the baronetcy of Playford.

== Origins ==
=== Norman Beginnings ===
The de Feltones of the Middle Ages were a cadet branch of the Bertram family, Barons of Mitford, who held Mitford Castle in Northumberland. The Bertrams' presence in Mitford dates back to the Norman Conquest of England. Prior to 1066, Mitford Castle was held by Sir John de Mitford, whose only daughter and heir, Sybilla Mitford, was married by William the Conqueror to the Norman knight Sir Richard de Bertram. This strategic marriage brought Mitford Castle and its lands into the hands of the Bertram family, and from this union, the Lords of Mitford descended.

=== Struggles Against the Crown ===
By the 13th century, the Lordship was held by Sir William de Bertram, who married Alice d'Umfraville, the sister of Robert d'Umfraville. He was succeeded by his son, Roger II, who, during his lifetime, rebelled against King John. As a result, much of his lands, including Mitford Castle, were confiscated and given to Philip de Ulecote. However, the Bertrams were later restored to their lands by King Henry III. Roger II had at least two sons, Roger III, who inherited the title, and Pagan (also known as Paine)

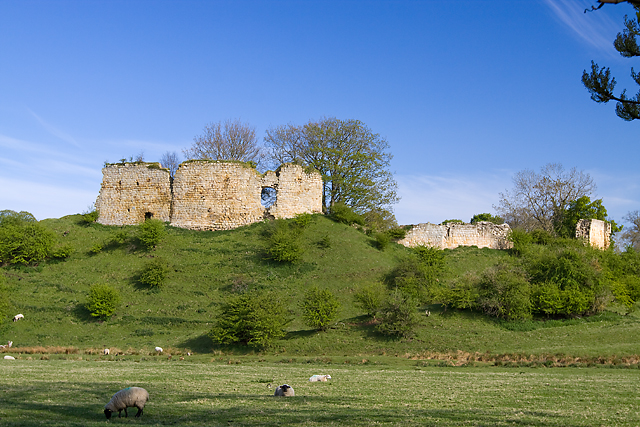
Mitford Castle, the seat of the Bertram family.

Sir Roger III Bertram also aligned himself with the baronial forces: during the Second Barons' War. Following his capture at the Battle of Northampton in 1264, much of his lands, including Mitford Castle, were seized by the crown and subsequently fragmented. Although he briefly regained favour that year, he had already lost significant portions of his estates

=== Founding ===
During the period of forfeiture, it is plausible that some lands passed to Sir Roger’s younger brother, Pagan (or Paine), who is recorded as "Pagan of Upper Felton," one of his father’s holdings. In cases of forfeiture, it was customary for land to be redistributed within the family, often to secondary heirs, especially when immediate male relatives were available to inherit or manage the estates. Pagan, thus, may have retained or acquired some portion of the Bertram lands in Northumberland.

Pagan had two sons: William (known as the Elder) and Robert (or Roger). William remained in the North and founded the Northumberland branch of the family, while Robert established the Norfolk branch. However, genealogical records can be inconsistent, sometimes listing them as father and son, which has led to confusion. Both would be known as 'Fitz-Paine' and 'de Feltone'

== Felton of Edlingham ==
Sir William Felton the Elder (died c. 1328)

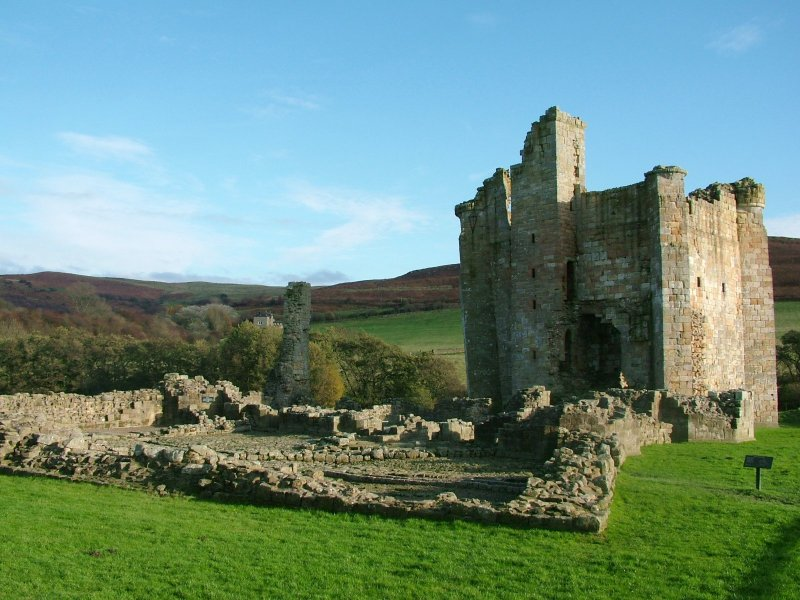
Edlingham Castle today.

Sir William Felton the Elder of West Maften was a key figure in establishing the Felton family’s influence along the Anglo-Scottish border during the late 13th and early 14th centuries. He served as High Sheriff of Northumberland and held successive appointments as Constable of four royal castles, initially in Wales and later in Northern England. His acquisition of Edlingham Castle in 1294 marked the establishment of the Northern Felton branch's family seat, and he fortified the property to serve as a defensive stronghold in the politically unstable border region. Sir William’s prominent roles and acquisition of land were critical in cementing the family’s influence and loyalty to the Crown, enhancing their strategic importance during a period of frequent conflicts with Scotland. He married Constance de Pontop, a distant heiress of Philip de Ulecote. Through this marriage he obtained land in Matfen, Nafferton and Lorbottle. Upon his death in c. 1328, his land passed to his son William.

Sir William Felton the Younger (died c.1358)

Sir William Felton the Younger continued his family’s tradition of Crown service, distinguishing himself in both military and political roles. Throughout his career, he held the position of Constable of Roxburgh Castle, a key fortress on the Anglo-Scottish border, and represented Northumberland in at least four parliamentary sessions, cementing his influence in the region.

Through his second marriage to Isabel, he acquired the manor of Hinton, expanding the Felton estate beyond Northumberland. By the end of his life, the Felton family estates included the manors of West Matfen, Heddon, and Buteland; significant holdings in Nafferton, Lemington, Lorbottle, Milbourne, Whittingham, and Thirston; the vill of Medomsley and the manor of Hamsterley in Durham; and Boddington in Northamptonshire, which generated over 20 marks per year.

After his death around 1358, his estates were divided: the majority of his lands went to his son from his first marriage, another Sir William, while Hinton passed to his son from his second marriage, Sir John.

Sir William Felton "the Lionheart" (d. 1367)

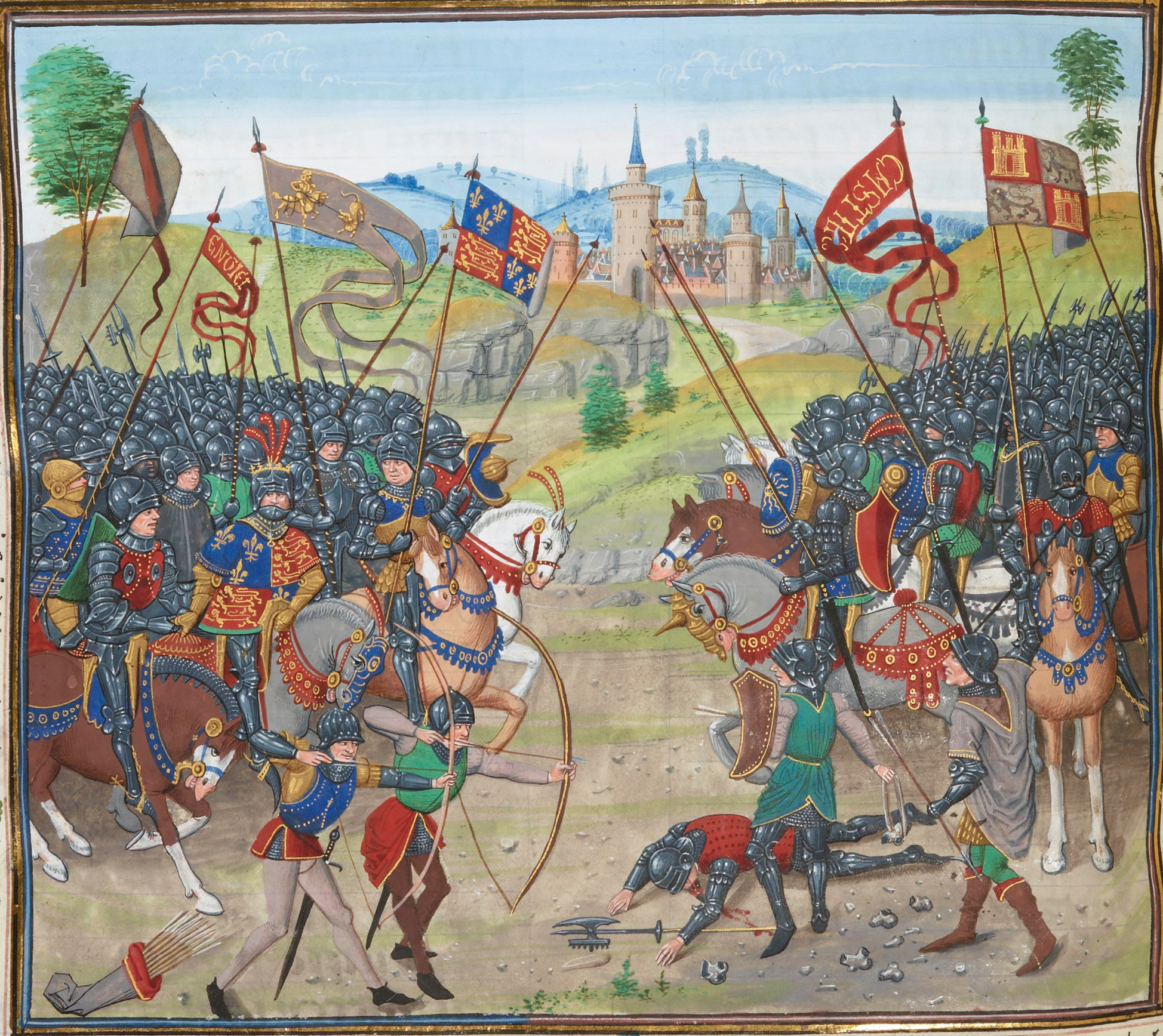
Battle of Nájera 1367. Sir William Felton died in a skirmish led by Sir Thomas Felton before this battle.

Sir William Felton, known as "the Lionheart," was an English knight and prominent military leader during the Hundred Years' War, remembered for his bravery and loyalty to the Crown. Felton held significant military and administrative roles, including Seneschal of Poitou in France, High Sheriff of Northumberland, and Lord Justice of all the king's lands in Scotland, reflecting his importance in English campaigns against both France and Scotland. He served as a loyal commander under Edward III and Prince Edward, the Black Prince, furthering English influence in contested regions

Felton's valour earned him special mention in The Life of the Black Prince by Chandos Herald, who described him as "Felleton Guilliam qui ot cœur de lyon," or "William Felton who had the heart of a lion." His reputation for courage was celebrated during his lifetime, as he was noted for taking risks and leading charges.

In the later stages of his career, Felton participated in the Castilian civil war, fighting for King Pedro of Castile against Pedro's half-brother, Henry of Trastámara, who was backed by the French. William took part in his cousin Thomas' invasion of Castille. On 19 March 1367, Felton was killed at Aríñez, near the site of the Battle of Nájera (Navarrete), in a skirmish that took place shortly before the battle. During this encounter, Felton, alongside a small group of English knights, mounted a heroic but ill-fated defense against a much larger Spanish force.

Felton’s last stand was marked by his courage and determination; he led a charge against the enemy, even after being heavily outnumbered. When his horse was killed, he continued to fight on foot until he was ultimately overwhelmed. This act of valour left a strong impression, becoming legendary among the local people and inspiring later writers. Sir Arthur Conan Doyle dramatized this event in his historical novel The White Company (1891), portraying Felton's final stand as emblematic of the chivalric ideals of the time.

Sir John Felton (d. 1391)

Sir John Felton was a key figure in 14th-century English border affairs. On the death of his half-brother, Sir William Felton in 1367, Sir John succeeded to the majority of his half-brother's estates, though this succession was contested by the guardians of Sir William's nephews, William Hilton and Thomas Swinburne. Despite their efforts to prove that the estates had been settled upon the boys, Sir John won a lengthy legal dispute by 1372, securing most of the inheritance except for a few holdings, which were later returned to the nephews.

A trusted figure in the English military, Sir John served as a conservator of truces with Scotland and fought in the Battle of Otterburn in 1388 under the command of Sir Henry Percy, also known as "Hotspur." His leadership and military engagements strengthened his position in the North. Additionally, he held the office of High Sheriff of Northumberland and was elected as a representative of the county in Parliament.

Upon his death in 1391, his estates passed to his daughters, and his lineage ultimately merged into the holdings, ending Felton prominence in the region.

== Felton of Litcham ==
Sir Robert Felton (d. 1314)

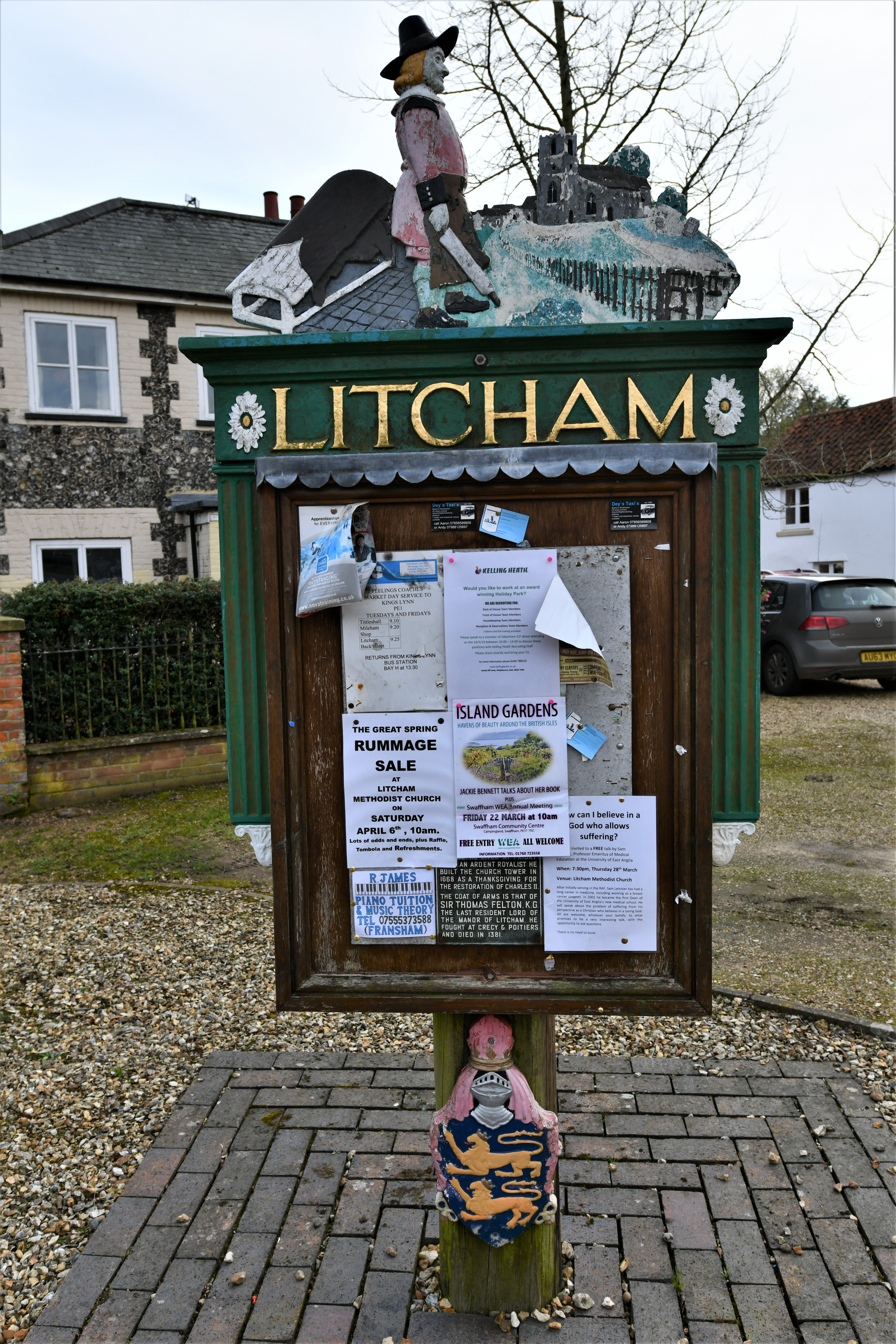
Village sign, Litcham. The coat of arms, bottom, is that of the Feltons of Litcham, but has been repainted in the wrong colours.

The Feltons of Litcham descended from Pagan (Paine)'s other son, the aforementioned Roger or Robert de Feltone. He married Hawise, a daughter of John IV le Strange, who was the son of John III le Strange of Knockyn. Through this marriage, Robert was granted the Manor of Litcham, in Norfolk, a seat of the le Stranges.

Robert Felton's military career was notable. He was part of the English army during the campaign in Scotland in 1298, and by 1300, he had been appointed Constable of Lochmaben Castle. During an attack by Scots from Caerlaverock Castle, Robert killed the constable of Caerlaverock, Robert Cunningham, and famously displayed Cunningham's head on the great tower of Lochmaben as a symbol of his victory. Later, he was named Constable of Scarborough Castle.

Robert participated in the Battle of Bannockburn in 1314, where he was killed. His military exploits mirrored those of his brother, Sir William Felton the Elder, who was also a distinguished soldier. Some sources list there being two Roberts, father and son, but there being one is a simpler explanation.

Sir John Felton

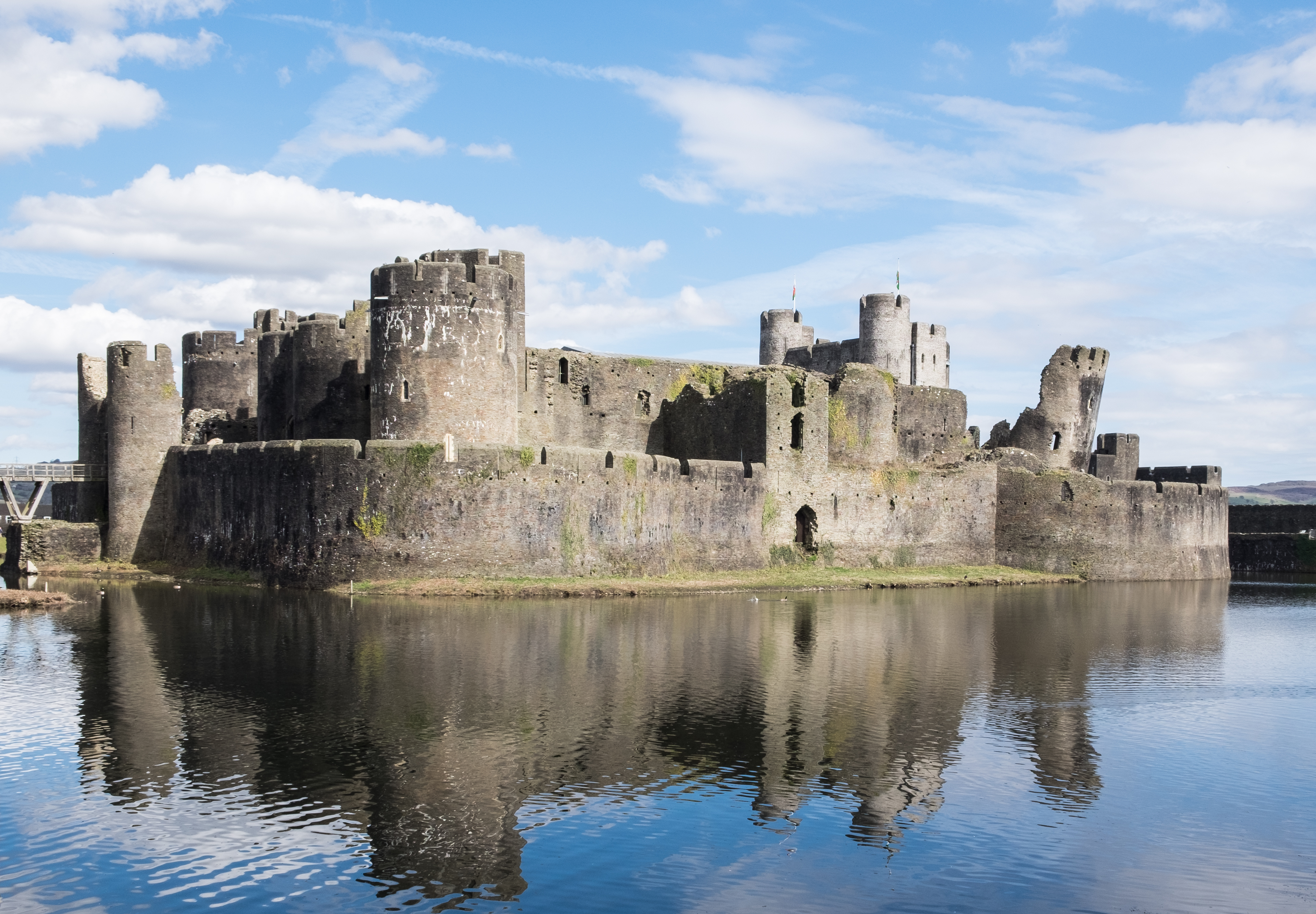
Caerphilly Castle.

Sir John Felton was the son of Robert Felton and a key figure in 14th-century English military and administrative affairs. He held various important posts, most notably as Constable of Newcastle and Admiral of the West. His loyalty to the crown was demonstrated during the turbulent reign of Edward II.

In 1326, Sir John Felton played a significant role in the defense of Caerphilly Castle during the rebellion against Edward II and his favourite, Hugh Despenser the Younger. As constable of Caerphilly, Felton was besieged by Robert Chaundos. Despite pressure to surrender Hugh Despenser the Younger's son, also named Hugh, to the invading army of Roger Mortimer and Queen Isabella, Felton remained loyal to the king and rejected offers of pardon for the defenders in exchange for Despenser’s capture. The siege was eventually lifted without further violence, and all inside the castle, including Despenser, were pardoned.

Prior to this, John had been given Lyonshall Castle by Edward II, after it passed into crown hands. However when Mortimer and Isabella invaded, William Devereux - who had a longstanding claim to the castle - rose in their support, and seized it. After Edward II abdicated in 1327, John requested the castle's return, but he was compensated instead.

John's legacy is marked by his loyalty to the crown during a period of internal strife, and his role in defending key fortifications like Caerphilly Castle, which to this day has a tower named in his honour—Felton's Tower.

Sir Hamon Felton (d.1379)

John had three sons, Sir Hamon, Sir Thomas, and Sir Edmund. Hamon was the eldest, and so inherited his father's lands. He became the Knight of the Shire for Norfolk twice, in 1372 and 1377, but died with no male heirs, and his younger brother Thomas succeeded him in 1379.

Sir Thomas Felton (d.1381)

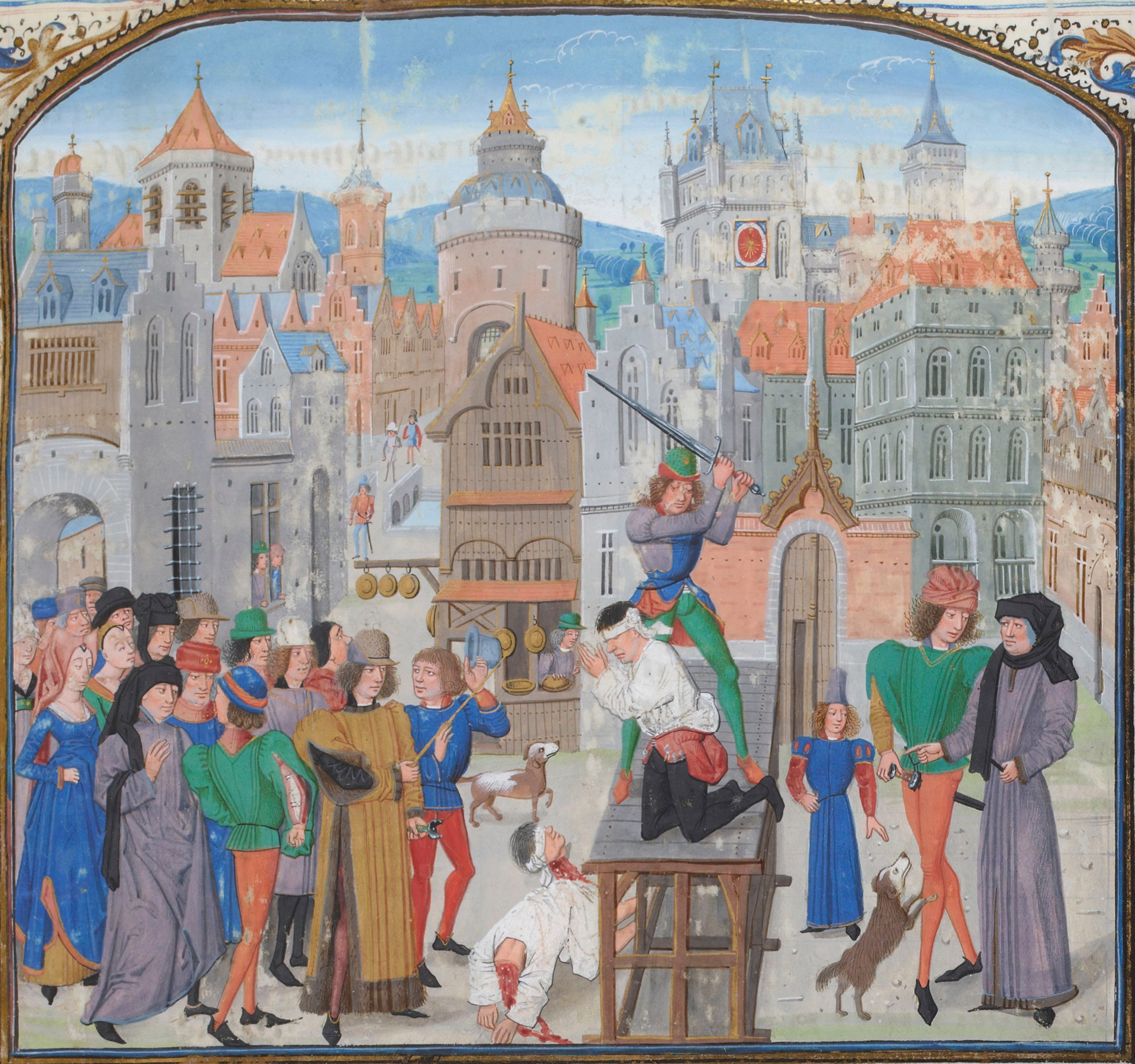
Sir Thomas Felton KG (in brown) seen ordering the execution of Guillaume de Pommiers, in Bordeaux.

Sir Thomas Felton is remembered as one of the most prominent knights in his family’s history, playing a significant role in the Hundred Years' War. His military career began with his involvement in the pivotal Battle of Crécy (1346) and continued through key engagements, including the Siege of Calais and the Battle of Poitiers (1356). His participation in these early campaigns earned him favor with Edward, the Black Prince, and he became an important figure in the English campaigns in France.

Felton was a signatory of the Treaty of Brétigny (1360) and notably served as the principal witness to the Black Prince’s marriage. By the 1360s, Felton had risen to the position of Seneschal of Aquitaine, a post he held alongside his cousin, Sir William Felton, who governed Poitou. His military prowess continued when he led a successful invasion of Spain with John Chaundos in 1367, though he was captured at the Battle of Aríñez, where his cousin William was killed. Felton was later exchanged as a hostage for the French Marshal, Arnoul d'Audrehem.

Felton’s later years were marked by further captures, including one in 1377, for which he was ransomed for thirty thousand francs. He was made a Knight of the Garter in 1381 but died later that same year.

Despite his fame, Sir Thomas Felton left no male heir, as his only son died at birth. The Manor of Litcham, therefore, reverted to the le Strange family due to the marriage contract of his grandfather, Sir Robert Felton. Felton had three daughters, his coheiresses. His daughter, Eleanor, married Thomas Hoo, and had the son Thomas Hoo, Baron Hoo and Hastings, the great-great-great grandfather of Queen Elizabeth I.

== Felton of Playford ==
Sir Anthony Felton (d.1613)

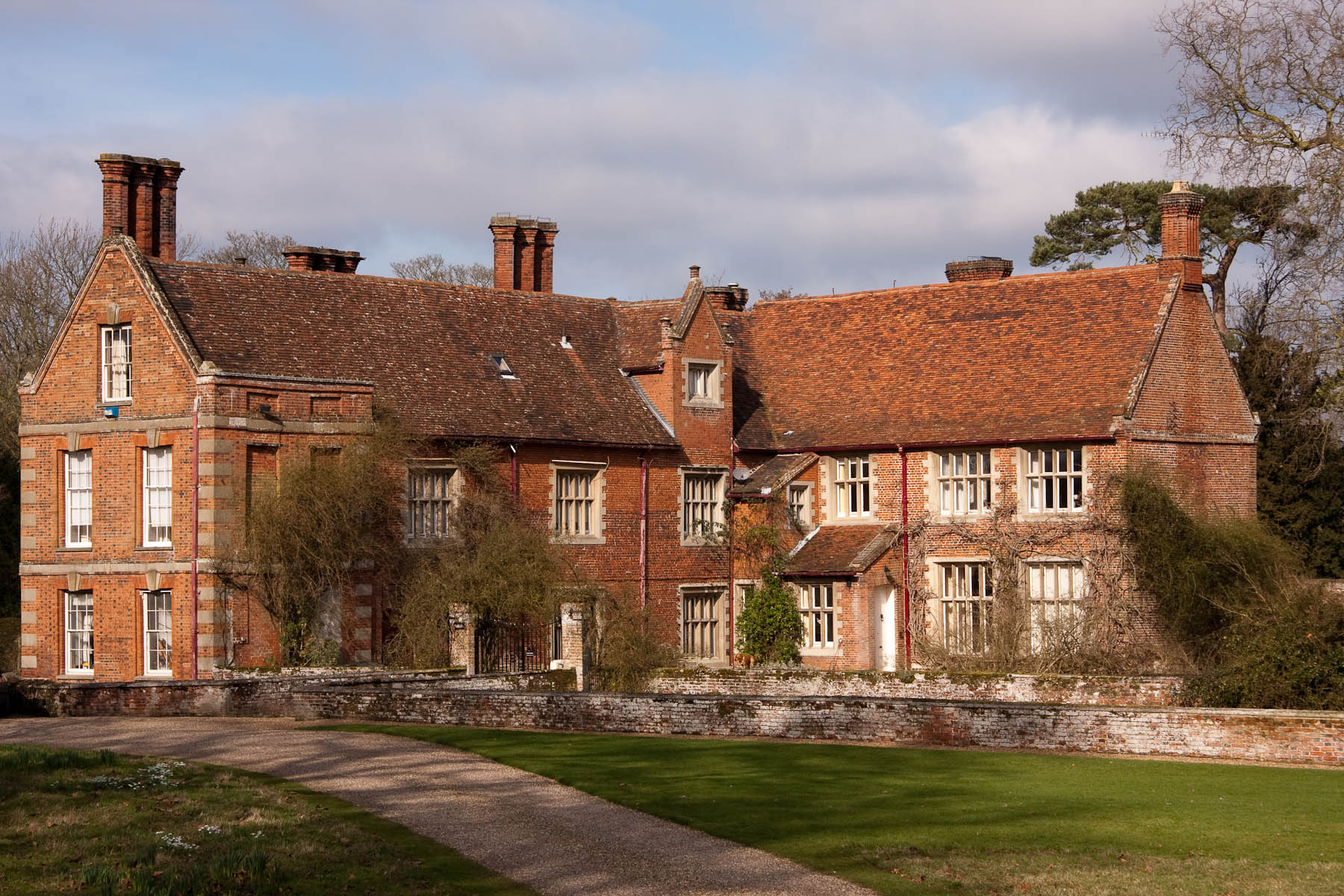
Playford Hall today.

The Feltons of Playford were descended from Thomas' younger brother Edmund, who was still alive in 1364. Sir Anthony Felton was the third generation of his family to reside in Playford. He served as Sheriff of Suffolk in 1597, was knighted in 1603, and in the 1590s, he married into the nobility, with his wife being the daughter of Lord Grey de Groby. This connection provided him with ample justification for constructing a grand new home. The house he built is a Grade II* moated Elizabethan mansion: Playford Hall, though the eastern section is believed to have been demolished in the mid-18th century, with the reasons for this still under debate. Sir Anthony died in 1613, shortly after the house’s completion.

Sir Henry Felton, 1st Baronet (d.1624)

Sir Henry Felton was the son and heir of Sir Anthony Felton. He inherited the Felton estate at Playford and was granted the title of Baronet in 1620 during the reign of James I. Sir Henry married Dorothy, the daughter of Sir Bassingbourne Gawdy, a prominent landowner with estates in Norfolk and Suffolk. His marriage into the Gawdy family solidified his status among the English gentry. Sir Henry’s tenure as Baronet marked a significant step in the family’s ascent to greater prominence. He died on September 18, 1624, shortly after receiving his Baronetcy.

Sir Henry Felton, 2nd Baronet (1619-1690)

Sir Henry Felton succeeded his father, Sir Henry Felton, 1st Baronet, at the age of five upon his father's death in 1624. He was placed under the guardianship of the Chancery. For much of his early life, Sir Henry resided at Shotley, as his grandmother, Sir Anthony’s widow, retained Playford Hall for her jointure. In 1677, a story from Clarke’s History of Ipswich recounts an incident where Sir Henry feigned illness to avoid a meeting with Sir Phineas Pratt regarding the sale of timber.

Sir Henry was twice elected as Member of Parliament for Suffolk, serving in the Convention Parliament and in the second Parliament of Charles II from 1661 to 1678. In 1677, a pamphlet attributed to Andrew Marvell described him as "a Pensioner" and his son as a "Bed-chamberman." Sir Henry is also noted for a quarrel with his cousins, the Gawdys, which led to a conflict with Parliament after he brought charges against Mr. Gawdy.

He married Susan, the daughter of Sir Lionel Tollemache, 2nd Baronet, with whom he had five sons and two daughters. Sir Henry Felton died in 1690, and was succeeded by his eldest son Adam.

Sir Adam Felton, 3rd Baronet (1637-1697)

Sir Adam Felton succeeded to the baronetcy in 1690. He served as Member of Parliament for Thetford in 1689 and 1690, and for Orford in 1695 until his death. In the early 1670s, he married Elizabeth, the widow of Sir Francis Foljambe, 1st Baronet., Edward Horner, and William Monson, 1st Viscount Monson of Castlemaine. Elizabeth was the daughter of Sir George Beresby of Thrybergh, Yorkshire, and Elizabeth Tamworth, co-heir of John Tamworth of Shervile Court, Hampshire. Born in 1613, Elizabeth died in 1695, and administration of her estate was granted in 1696. Sir Adam Felton died without issue in February 1697. His will, dated 25 January 1697, was proved on 19 February 1697.

Sir Thomas Felton, 4th Baronet (1649–1709)

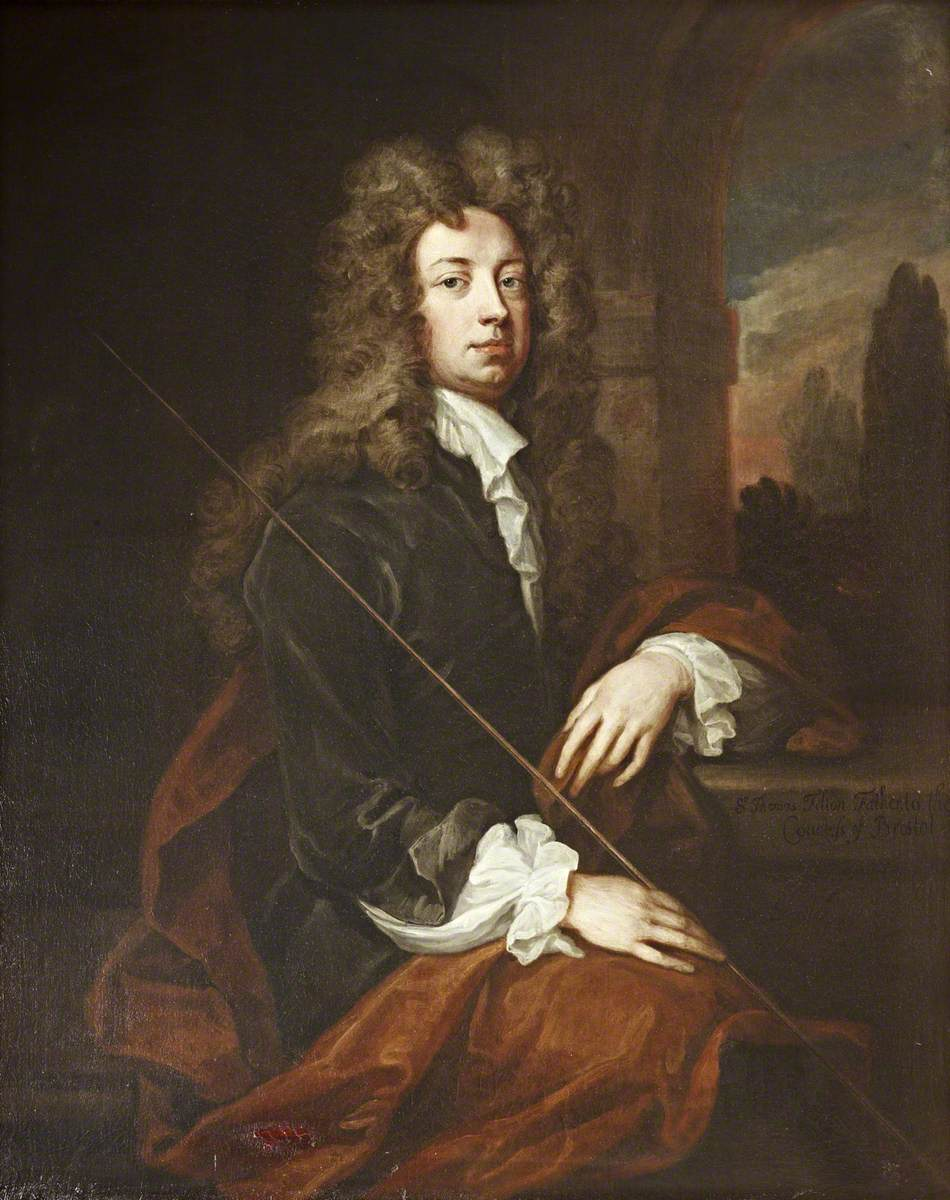
Sir Thomas Felton, 4th Baronet of Playford, by Godfrey Kneller.

Sir Thomas Felton was an English politician and courtier, remembered for his close association with the royal household. He was the brother and heir to the Felton baronetcy, which he inherited in 1697.A notable figure at the court of King Charles II, Felton served as one of the Grooms of the Bedchamber, attending to the king's personal needs. He also held the prestigious role of Comptroller of the Household to Queen Catherine of Braganza, Charles II’s wife.

Felton’s political career included representing Orford as a Member of Parliament from 1690 to 1700 and Bury St Edmunds from 1701 to 1709. During his tenure in Parliament, Felton was involved in several sessions, contributing to political discourse during the turbulent reigns of William III and Queen Anne.

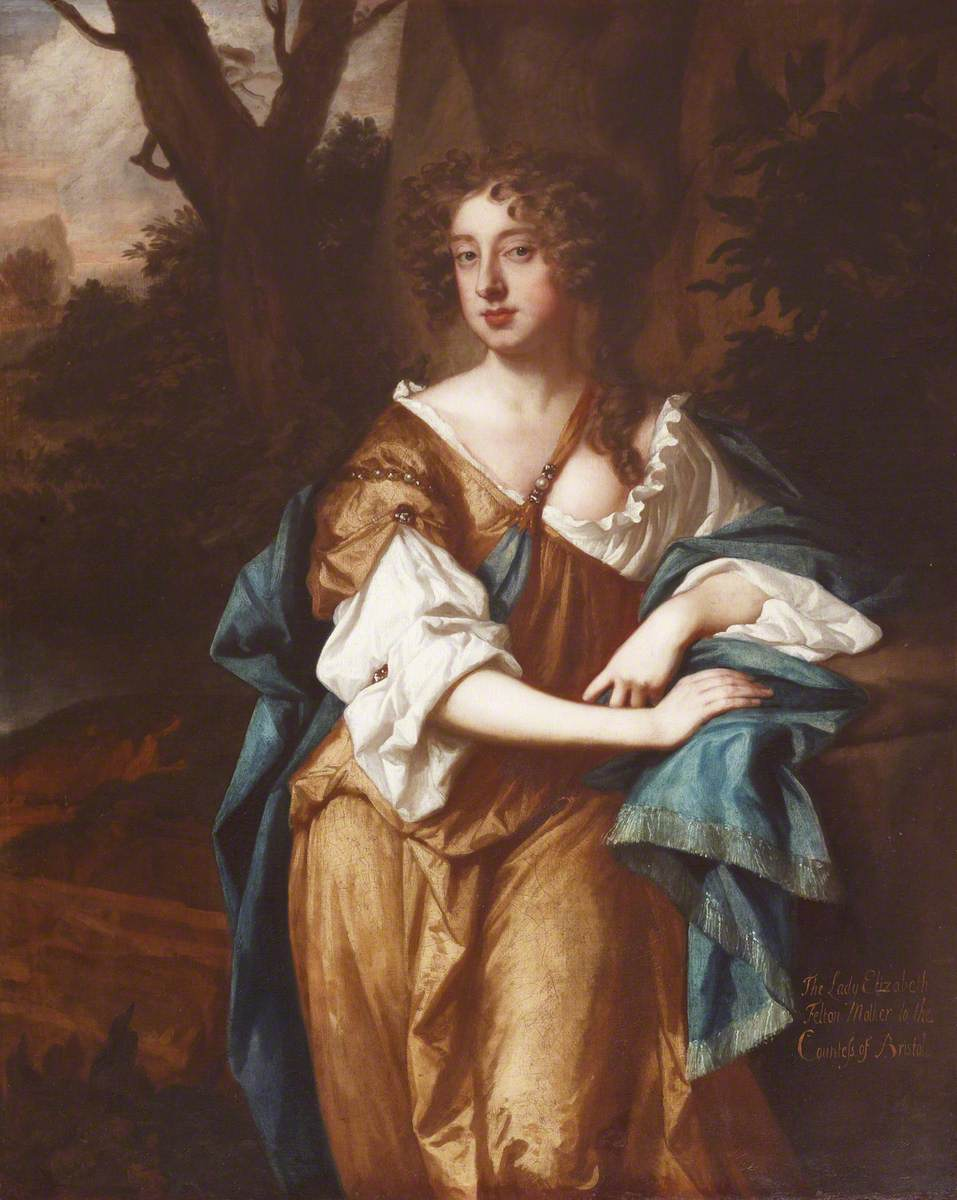
Lady Elizabeth Howard, Lady Felton, by Sir Peter Lely.

He married Elizabeth Howard, the daughter of James Howard, 3rd Earl of Suffolk, and Barbara Villiers. She eloped with him in 1675, when she was just 19. She was a Maid of Honour to Queen Catherine of Braganza, known for her beauty and scandalous reputation. She had affairs with notable figures at court, such as the poet John Wilmot, 2nd Earl of Rochester, Francis the son of 1st Earl of Bradford, and possibly the Duke of Monmouth. Elizabeth died in December 1681 at the age of 25, and she was buried at Walden. The couple had a daughter, Elizabeth. On Felton’s death, 2 March 1709, the baronetcy passed to his brother

Sir Compton Felton, 5th Baronet (c.1650–1719)

Sir Compton Felton inherited the title from Sir Thomas, but died without male heirs. He married Frances Finch of Playford, but they had no children, leading to the extinction of the Felton Baronetcy upon his death. Sir Compton died on November 18, 1719, at his home in Ipswich at the age of 69.

Influence in other families

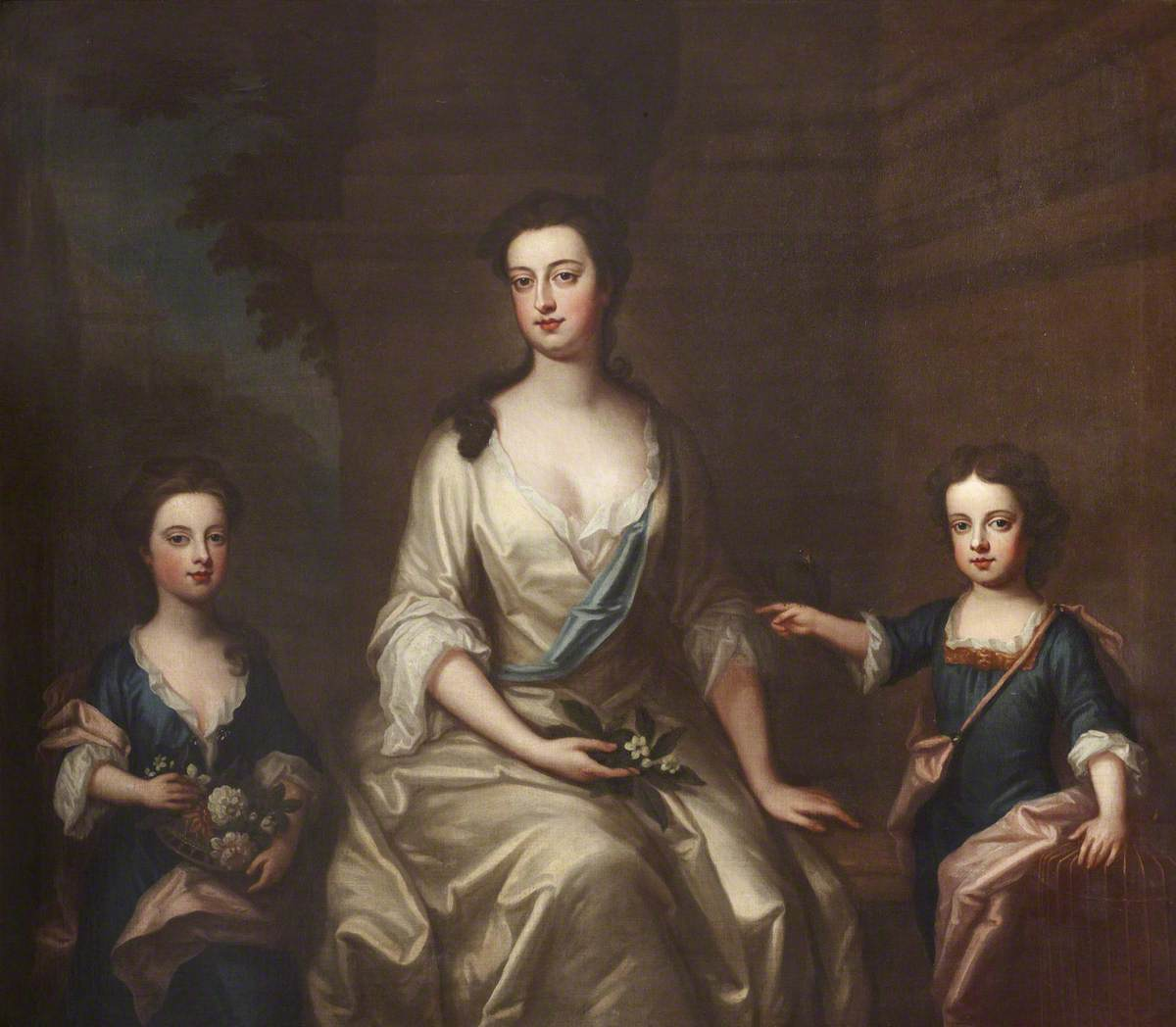
Elizabeth Hervey, née Felton, Countess of Bristol, with her children, by Charles d'Agar.

Sir Thomas Felton's daughter, Elizabeth, would go on to marry John Hervey, 1st Earl of Bristol (On Thomas' death the Herveys would inherit Playford Hall, the 5th Earl leasing it to Thomas Clarkson the abolitionist, in 1813), and have seventeen children.

One of which she named Felton Hervey, who would become a politician, and name one of his sons Felton Lionel Hervey. Felton Lionel Hervey became a Lieutenant, and married a daughter of Sir John Elwill, 4th Baronet. His son, Colonel Felton Hervey-Bathurst, 1st Baronet, would go on to be a decorated officer, losing an arm in the process, and was on Wellington's staff at Waterloo. Thus an obscure family name became an even rarer given name, surviving today as a middle name of businessman and historic preservationist James Felton Somers Hervey-Bathurst CBE DL, grandson of the 5th Baronet. The Playford estate continued to be held in Hervey hands for 200 years, until it was sold following the death of the 4th Marquess in 1951.

== Other notable Feltons ==
John Felton (Martyr) (died 1570)

An English Catholic martyr, executed during the reign of Elizabeth I. Felton was arrested for fixing a copy of Pope Pius V's bull Regnans in Excelsis excommunicating Queen Elizabeth, to the gates of the Bishop London's palace near St. Paul's. His son Thomas was also martyred in 1588.

Nicholas Felton (Bishop) (1556–1626)

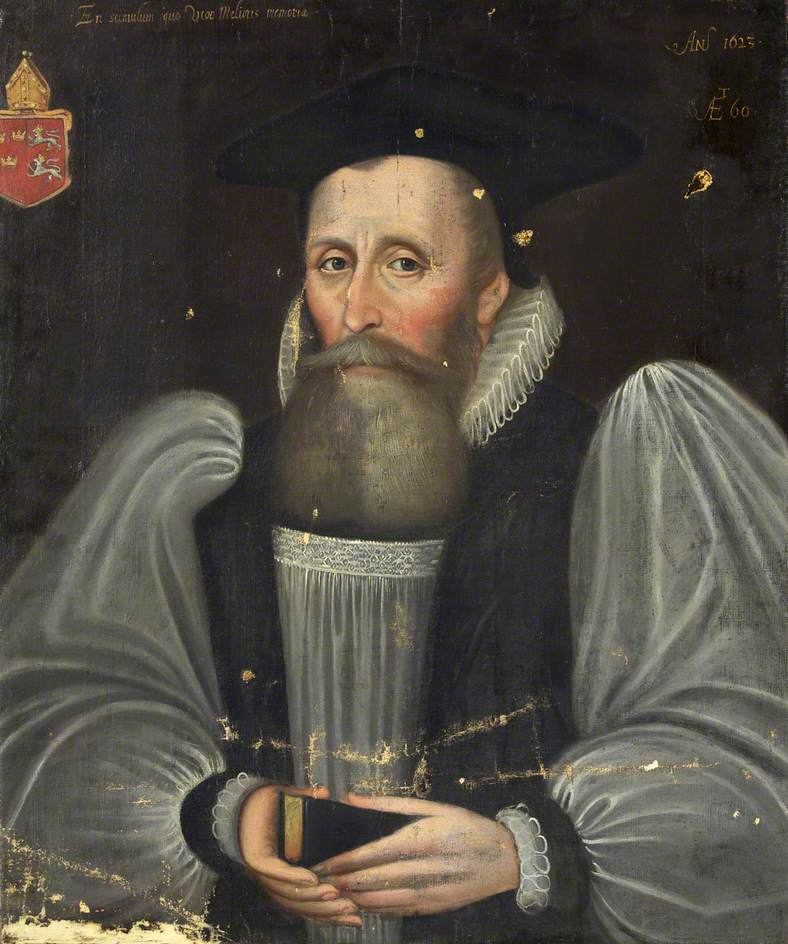
Bishop Nicholas Felton.

A Bishop and Academic, Nicholas was born in Great Yarmouth and educated at Pembroke Hall, Cambridge. He was the Bishop of Bristol from 1617 to 1619, and then Bishop of Ely.

John Felton (Assassin) (c. 1595 – 1628)

An English military officer who assassinated the hated George Villiers, 1st Duke of Buckingham by stabbing him to death in the Greyhound Pub at Portsmouth on 23 August 1628, and was hanged at Tyburn on 29 November 1628. In a miscalculation by authorities, his body was sent back to Portsmouth for exhibition where, rather than becoming a lesson in disgrace, it was made an object of veneration. He was possibly born in Suffolk, and related to the Feltons of Playford.

Nathaniel Felton (1615 – 1705)

A Massachusetts landowner and official, Nathaniel Felton was born in Great Yarmouth, England. He emigrated from England in 1633 with his mother during the Puritan migration to New England. Nathaniel Felton is considered to be the first ancestor of the "Northern line of Feltons" to arrive in the American colonies, settling in the Massachusetts Bay Colony.
