= Thomas Felton (KG) =

English soldier and administrator

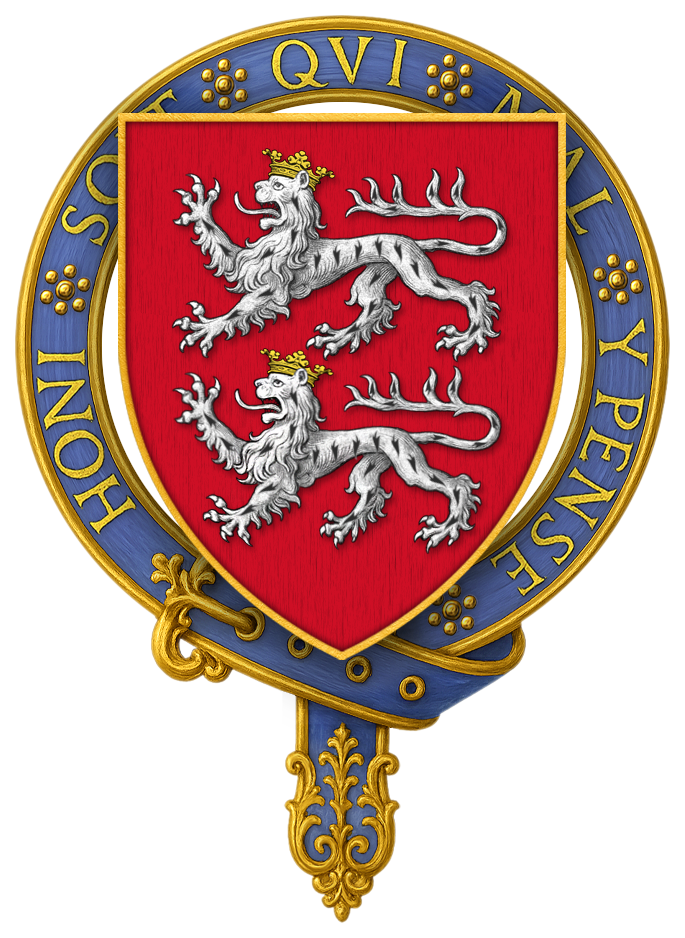
Coat of Arms of Sir Thomas Felton, KG: Gules, two lions passant in pale ermine, crowned or.

Sir Thomas de Felton (died 2 April 1381) was an English landowner, military knight, envoy and administrator. He fought at the Battle of Crécy in 1346, and the Capture of Calais in 1347. He was also at the Battle of Poitiers in 1356. A recurrent figure in the Chronicles of Jean Froissart, he was a signatory to the Treaty of Brétigny in 1360. In 1362 he was appointed Seneschal of Aquitaine. He accompanied Edward the Black Prince on his Spanish campaign. He was taken prisoner by Henry of Trastámara's forces in 1367. In 1372 he was appointed joint-governor of Aquitaine and seneschal of Bordeaux. He caused Guillaume de Pommiers and his secretary to be beheaded for treason in 1377. He was invested a Knight of the Garter in 1381.

== Origins ==
The de Feltons of Norfolk derived in a junior line from William Bertram, Baron of Mitford, Northumberland. William's great-grandson Roger (died 26 Henry III, 1242) had an elder son Roger (from whom the Barons of Mitford descended), and a younger son Pagan, of Upper Felton, Northumberland, whose son William FitzPagan, called de Felton, was governor of Bamburgh Castle in 1315. At much the same time, in 1311, William's son Sir Robert de Felton was governor of Scarborough Castle, and in the next years was summoned to Parliament before he was slain at Stirling in 1314. According to Thomas de Felton's inquisition post mortem, Sir Robert had married Hawise daughter of John IV le Strange of Knockin, Shropshire, who bestowed on the marriage and their heirs male the lordship of the manor of Litcham, an ancient seat of the Le Strange family in Norfolk. This descended through Sir John de Felton of Shropshire and Norfolk, against whom various actions for debt survive from the 1330s.

Sir John de Felton had three sons, Hamon, Thomas and Edmund. Sir Hamon, the senior heir, inherited the lordship of Litcham and was Knight of the Shire (M.P.) for Norfolk in 1372 and 1377. He married and had a daughter, but made his will in 1379 and died in that year without heir male, and was buried at the Carmelite Friary, King's Lynn.. Sir Thomas de Felton, who married Joan Walkefare in or before 1356, inherited Litcham as the brother and male heir of Hamon, and died without male heir living in 1381, survived by Joan and their three daughters. He was therefore lord of Litcham for only two years. Sir Thomas and Dame Joan occupied certain Norfolk lands of Joan's kinsman Sir Richard Walkfare after his death in 1370–1371, including Gelham Hall at Dersingham, which Sir Richard had conveyed to John and Elizabeth de Reppes in 1354, at about the time of Joan's marriage. Other Walkfare lands were formally released to Joan during her widowhood in 1384. The manor of Fordham Feltons (Cambridgeshire) came to the Feltons in 1375, through the 1362 betrothal of their daughter Mary to Edmund Hengrave, who died overseas in 1374. Edmund de Felton, who was living in 1364, married a daughter of Robert Gerrard of Coddenham, Suffolk.

== Career ==
Crécy and Poictiers

Thomas de Felton was with the expedition commanded by Edward III which invaded France in 1346, and he took part in the Battle of Crécy, the capture of Calais and the other important events of that campaign. He became an important figure in the service of Edward the Black Prince. When Prince Edward went to take possession of Gascony in 1355, Felton went with him, and followed him to the Battle of Poitiers. His marriage to Joan de Walkfare and the birth of his children followed in the later 1350s. He was one of the commissioners who signed the Treaty of Brétigny (1360) and took oath to see it executed. He is named among the principal witnesses to the marriage of Prince Edward to Joan, Countess of Kent in 1361, as "miles" (i.e., Knight), and appears elsewhere as "chivaler", through most of his career.

Seneschal of Aquitaine

By letters dated 8 February 1362, Sir Thomas de Felton, as Seneschal of Aquitaine, represented Prince Edward's authority there, and served as Steward of his household during 1363. He made Richard de Walkfare an attorney for his affairs in England during his absence. He was deputed to receive Peter I, King of Cyprus, who came to Aquitaine to visit the prince in 1364. He also had power to treat with Pedro, king of Castile. When Don Pedro asked to be reinstated to the Crown of Castile, the prince referred the matter to Sir John Chandos and to Felton. Chandos was opposed, but Felton recommended that the barons and knights of Aquitaine should be consulted in the matter, and the prince replied, "It shall be done". The larger council decided that Felton should be sent to Spain with a fleet of twelve ships to bring Don Pedro. Felton's expedition landed at Bayonne, where Don Pedro had already arrived, and returned with him and his suite to Bordeaux.

Campaigns in Spain and Poitou

The invasion of Spain having been agreed upon, Felton and Chandos obtained leave from the King Charles II of Navarre to cross the mountain passes into Spain. Felton in March 1367 preceded the prince with an advance force of 200 men-at-arms and archers, and found the enemy encamped near Navarrete. They were attacked by a large body of Spaniards, and all were either killed or taken prisoner in a battle at Aríñez. Sir William de Felton, Thomas's kinsman and Seneschal of Poitou, was among the slain. Thomas was taken prisoner, and was later exchanged for Arnoul d'Audrehem, Marshal of France, who was captured by the English at the Battle of Nájera (Navarrete) in April 1367. He afterwards took part in combats and sieges at Monsac, at Duravel, and at Domme. The lands and barony of Caumont in Gascony were given by Edward III to Sir John Chandos (died 1369), with a reversion at his death to Felton.

Felton's near kinsman Thomas Walkfare was Seneschal of Quercy and Périgord, and his brother Richard Walkfare Seneschal of Agenois, and also Mayor of Bordeaux 1366–69. Felton was recalled to Angoulême by the prince, and sent into Poitou with John Hastings, Earl of Pembroke. He secured La Linde on the Dordogne when it was about to be betrayed to the French. He joined John of Gaunt, Duke of Lancaster in an attack on the town of Mont-Paon, and made an unsuccessful attempt to relieve the garrison of Thouars. In spite of his efforts Monsac was lost to the English. In 1372, when the Black Prince had surrendered the principality of Aquitaine into the king's hands, it was granted by royal commission to Felton and Sir Robert Wykford. Upon the final withdrawal of the Duke of Lancaster, Felton was appointed Seneschal of Bordeaux.

Capture and ransom, 1377–1380

In February 1375 he returned to England. A year later he received orders to put the truce into effect, and, in December 1376, to negotiate with the King of Navarre. He caused Guillem-Sanche IV de Pommiers, Vicomte de Fronsac (heir of the ancient rulers of Gascony), and his confessor Coulon, to be beheaded at Bordeaux for treason. These events coincided with the close of the reign of Edward III.

Felton was at length again taken prisoner by the French near Bordeaux on 1 November 1377. In c. 1378 Dame Joan de Felton, his wife, petitioned the king that a French prisoner in England, the Count of Saint Pol (Waleran III, Count of Ligny), should not be ransomed until her husband had been set at liberty. In April 1380 a procuration had been signed by the Comte de Foix to set him at liberty. In August the king granted to Felton for the payment of his ransom thirty thousand francs, from the ransom of two French prisoners. During the same year Felton received letters of protection in England to enable him to return to France for matters connected with the payment of his ransom. At his death his lands and barony of Caumont in Gascony, over which his governance had been lacking, were granted by King Richard II to Sir Bertrucas d'Albret.

Death and chantry

Felton was made a Knight of the Garter in January 1381, and his plate is still to be seen in St George's Chapel, Windsor Castle, in the tenth stall, on the sovereign's side. He died 2 April 1381. Besides the manor of Litcham, Norfolk, Felton owned the manor called Felton's at Barrow, Suffolk, and other property in the neighbourhood. In 1384 John le Strange and his wife Eleanor, daughter and heir in the blood of Sir Richard de Walkefare, released to Joan de Felton certain manors from the inheritance of Sir Richard de Walkefare.

In the same year Joan de Felton enfeoffed the nominees of John de Snoryng, Prior of Walsingham, with the Walkfare manors of Great Ryburgh and Little Ryburgh, and the advowson of Great Ryburgh: they were to enfeoff the Prior, to find four chaplains to sing perpetually for the souls of Sir Thomas and Dame Joan Felton in a chapel to be made over the tomb of Sir Thomas at Walsingham. Joan made warranty against the claims of John and Eleanor Strange and their heirs, upon the manor of Great Ryburgh. After her death the feoffees were to grant an annual rent of £20 each to her daughters Dame Sibill de Morley, nun (and later to be abbess) in the Abbey of Barking, and Dame Mary de Felton, minoress in the Abbey of St Mary without Aldgate, and one of 100 shillings to John Sturmy of Incheton. Her tenant, Sir Stephen de Hales, could make the payments himself if preferred. The Prior and Convent were to keep the anniversary obits of Sir Thomas and Dame Joan Felton and their son Thomas Felton. Joan lived until at least March 1408.

== Family ==
Around 1357 Felton married Joan de Walkefare, and their three daughters and coheiresses were born soon afterwards. There was also a son, Thomas. Most secondary sources follow Blomefield's guess, in making Joan a daughter of Sir Richard de Walkefare of Great Ryburgh, Ingoldisthorpe, Isleham, etc. (died 1371). However Walkfare's only daughter and heiress named as such in primary sources is Alianore, wife of John Le Strange, who was born c. 1357 and betrothed in childhood. Although closely connected with them, Joan's life-dates and land transactions suggest that Joan may have been rather a sister of Sir Richard, and daughter of Sir Robert de Walkefare (died 1334), patron of Binham Priory and Lancastrian rebel. An account of the Walkfare descent is traced for the manors of Isleham, and a pedigree is attempted by Walter Rye. The arms and crest of Sir Thomas de Felton are illustrated in colour on the dustjacket cover of Joan Corder's Dictionary of Suffolk Crests.

The children of Sir Thomas de Felton and Joan de Walkfare were:

- Mary Felton (born c. 1357), was betrothed in infancy, c. 1362 and married first to
  - (1) Edmund Hemgrave, of Hengrave, Suffolk, who died overseas in 1374. She is then said to have married
  - (2) Sir Thomas de Breton in 1374 (in the chapel of Sir Thomas de Felton's mansion house in Candlewick Street, London), and after him
  - (3) Sir Geoffrey de Workeseley (Worsley), around 1376 at Leamington, "for his advancement", whose manors of Worsley and Hulton were settled upon the marriage. However these were seized in 1376 by the sheriff in respect of a debt of 6000 marks. It was later found that Mary's former husband had not died until November or December 1380, in Aquitaine, and the marriage to Sir Geoffrey was declared null. Sir Thomas Felton died in 1381. Sir Geoffrey, who had been in the Spanish war and had been a prisoner of war, claimed that the divorce was urged on her by his servant Thomas Pulle, who, being charged to protect Mary during Geoffrey's absence abroad, had dishonoured her (and, as he asserted, had married her). Returning, Geoffrey (who was re-enfeoffed in his manor of Worsley) had attacked and injured Pulle, who sometime later died. Geoffrey brought a petition disclaiming responsibility for Pulle's death. He remarried to Isabel, daughter of Sir Thomas de Lathom, by whom he had a daughter Elizabeth (born November 1383), but he also soon afterwards died, on 30 March 1385. By 1383 Mary had become a sister among the minoresses at Aldgate, London, where her mother endowed her with the reversion of a lifetime rent from certain manors which Joan had held in jointure with Sir Thomas Felton. A warrant for Mary's arrest as an "apostate vagabond sister", to be returned to the abbess for punishment, was issued in November 1385. After Sir Geoffrey's death, Sir Robert de Workeseley, guardian of Elizabeth, brought a second petition: Mary had quit the cloister claiming that she had entered it out of fear, and had begun lawsuits to reverse the grounds of her divorce, a process which would illegitimize and disinherit Elizabeth. The manors of Worsley and Hulton therefore passed to Sir Geoffrey's sister Alice, wife of Sir John Massey. Mary was now remarried to
  - (4) Sir John de Curson of Beck Hall, who conducted suits on her behalf both at the Common Bench and under Church law, by which the Pope confirmed her return to secular life. Woodger makes her the mother of the younger John Curson, but also identifies her as the same Maria de Felton who became Prioress of Campsey Priory, Suffolk, who received grants from John Le Strange, and who died in 1394.
- Sibyll Felton (born c. 1359), wife of Sir Thomas de Morley. The Cursons were tenants of the Lords Morley at Foulsham in Norfolk. Sibill was a nun at Barking Abbey by 1384, and became abbess of that monastery for 26 years, from 1393 until her death in 1419.
- Eleanor Felton (c. 1361–1400), married
  - (1) Sir Robert Ufford, de jure Lord Clavering, of Wrentham, Suffolk (died 1393), son of Edmund Ufford and Sibilla Pierpoint, and heir male of the de Ufford family after the death of his cousin William de Ufford, 2nd Earl of Suffolk. By him she had three daughters, Ela, Sibilla and Joan. Ela and Joan Ufford married the brothers Richard and Sir William Bowett respectively, while Sibill Ufford joined her aunt Sibill Felton (or Morley) as a nun at Barking. Joan's daughter Ela Bowett married into the Dacre family.
  - (2) Sir Thomas Hoo of Mulbarton, Norfolk (died 1420), by whom she became the mother of Thomas Hoo, Baron Hoo and Hastings.
- Thomas Felton, mentioned by his mother to be remembered in prayer in her chantry.

Thomas de Felton's brother, Sir Edmund Felton, who was living in 1364, was ancestor of Robert Felton of Shotley (died 1506). Robert, by his marriage with Margaret Sampson of Playford, Suffolk, acquired the Playford property, and was grandfather of Sir Anthony Felton, K.B. (died 1613). Sir Anthony's son, Henry (died 1659), was created a baronet 20 July 1620.

== Attribution ==
- This article incorporates text from a publication now in the public domain: Fotheringham, James Gainsborough (1889). "Felton, Thomas (d.1381)". In Stephen, Leslie (ed.). Dictionary of National Biography. Vol. 18. London: Smith, Elder & Co. p. 309–310.
  - Rymer's Fœdera; Archives de la Gironde; Anstis (ed.), Black Book (Rolls Series).
