= Battle of Nájera =

Battle of the Castilian Civil War

- Part of the Castilian Civil War
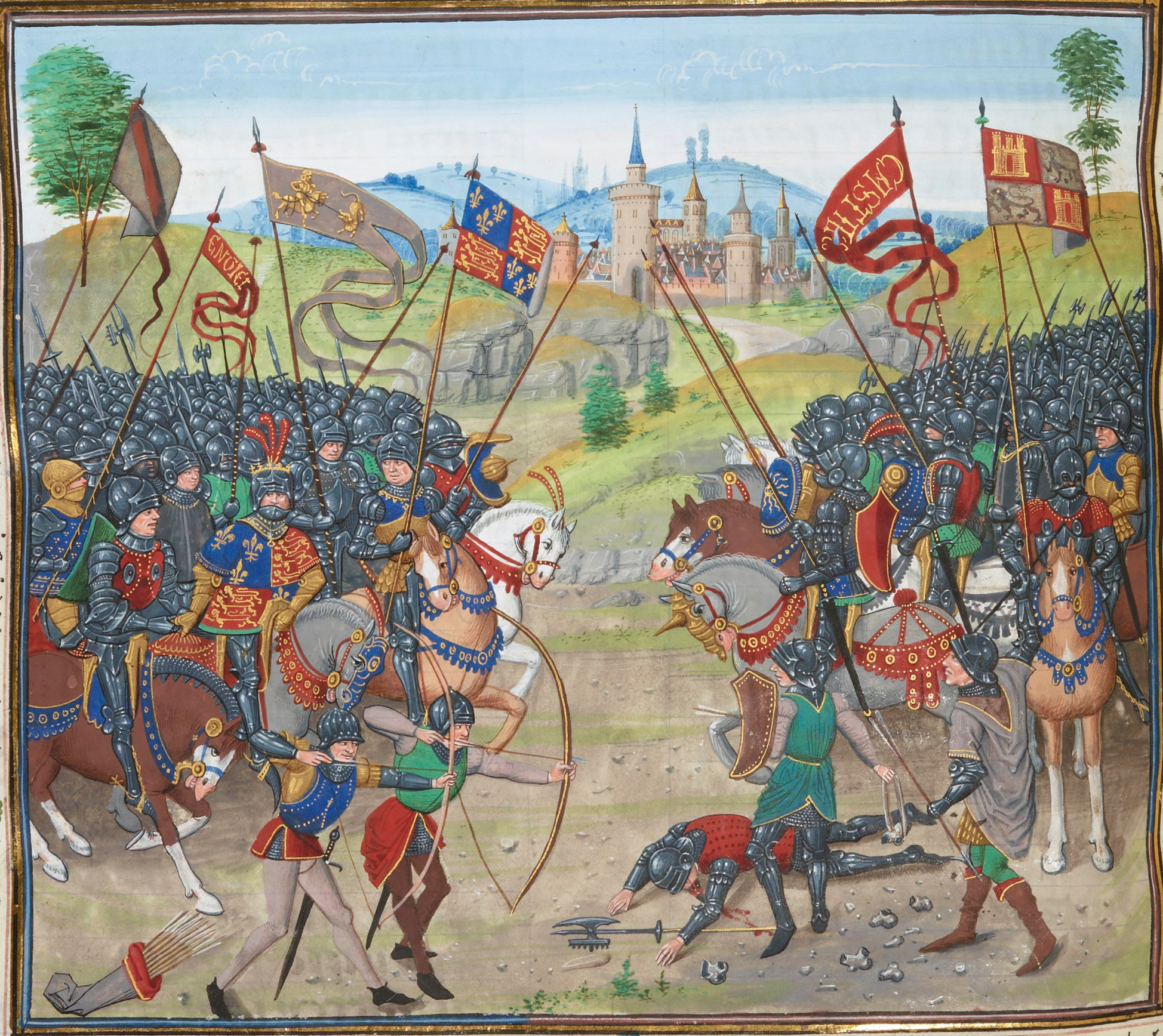
- The Battle of Nájera from a fifteenth-century manuscript of Froissart's Chronicles. The English and Peter of Castile are on the left.
Date	3 April 1367
Location	Nájera 42°25′39″N 02°42′00″W
Result	Victory for Peter I

Belligerents
Castilians supporting Peter; Kingdom of England; Duchy of Aquitaine; Kingdom of Majorca; Kingdom of Navarre; Other; Elite European mercenaries	Castilians supporting Henry; Kingdom of France; Crown of Aragon

Commanders and leaders
Peter of Castile; Edward, the Black Prince; Jean de Grailly; Gaston de Foix; John of Gaunt; John Chandos; Jean I d'Armagnac; James IV of Majorca	Henry of Trastámara; Bertrand du Guesclin; Alfonso of Ribagorza; Tello of Castile

Strength
Total: more than 10,000. 6,000 Elite European mercenaries 2,000 Aquitaine soldiers 1,000 English soldiers 800 Castilian soldiers 500 English longbowmen 300 Navarrese soldiers Troops from Majorca; Henry deserters and other Spanish followers of King Peter.	Total: more than 4,500. 2,500 Castilian soldiers 1,000 Elite French mercenaries 1,000 Aragonese soldiers

Casualties and losses
Unknown	Heavy losses

The Battle of Nájera, also known as the Battle of Navarrete, was fought on 3 April 1367 to the northeast of Nájera, in the province of La Rioja, Castile. It was an episode of the first Castilian Civil War which confronted King Peter of Castile with his half-brother Count Henry of Trastámara who aspired to the throne; the war involved Castile in the Hundred Years' War. Castilian naval power, far superior to that of France or England, encouraged the two polities to take sides in the civil war, to gain control over the Castilian fleet.

King Peter of Castile was supported by England, Aquitaine, Majorca, Navarre and the best European mercenaries hired by the Black Prince. His rival, Count Henry, was aided by a majority of the nobility and the Christian military organizations in Castile. While neither the Kingdom of France nor the Crown of Aragon gave him official assistance, he had on his side many Aragonese Soldiers and the French free companies loyal to his lieutenant the Breton knight and French commander Bertrand du Guesclin. Although the battle ended with a resounding defeat for Henry, it had disastrous consequences for King Peter, the Prince of Wales and England.

== Background ==
After the Treaty of Brétigny favorable to England was signed in 1360, ending the Edwardian phase of the Hundred Years' War, France tried to avoid open conflict with England and tried to associate with Castile to gain an advantage. France had to find employment for the mercenaries of the great companies dedicated to pillage now that there was no war. In late 1365, Charles V of France, with the help of Pope Urban V, succeeded in diverting temporarily most of the great companies. Under the pretext of carrying on a crusade against the Moorish Kingdom of Granada, the Pope paid for an expedition to Spain. Later on, France and Aragon paid to recruit these troops for Henry's cause, removing the free companies from France and supporting the ascent to power in Castile of their favorite. The strength of the army of Henry rested primarily on these companies, groups of mercenaries that had participated in the Hundred Years' War, composed mainly of Bretons, Gascons, English and French.

The Black Prince (Edward, Prince of Wales and Duke of Aquitaine) was the main beneficiary of the peace treaty of 1362 between England and Castile that allowed Castile to keep safe maritime trade routes and in turn England kept herself safe from the large Castilian war fleet. Edward did not seem interested in prohibiting the participation of his Gascon and English subjects in the Castilian Civil War on the side of the pretender Henry, although it favoured France and was against the interests of England. Aquitaine was going through a difficult stage as the main funding sources for this traditionally poor region were the wine industry (which was depressed) and warfare. Aquitaine no longer received subsidies from England and needed other sources of revenue.

England would not allow France to ally with Castile to establish Henry as the new king. When Peter I of Castile, who was losing the war against his stepbrother Henry and his mercenary troops, sought help, King Edward III of England ordered Sir John Chandos the constable of Aquitaine and other commissioners to ensure that the Gascon and English mercenaries stopped assisting Henry. In February 1366, England sent several Gascon great companies to strengthen the position of King Peter but these measures proved insufficient and Peter had to flee Castile.

=== Army composition ===
England then decided to recruit a huge army of mercenaries to support the cause of King Peter of Castile, with the incentive of plundering the riches of Castile. The Black Prince brought together a diverse and colossal army of Gascon, Poitevins and English nobles as well as distinguished mercenary troops consisting of the most famous captains of great companies that had struggled in recent years. These came mainly from Gascony but also from Brittany, Navarre, Foix, Germany (Holy Roman Empire), England, Calais, the County of Poitou, Hainault and elsewhere, including mercenaries who had served Henry of Trastámara in his ascension to the throne. With the mercenaries back in France, they aided the cause of his enemy, King Peter. This army probably numbered around 8,000 to 10,000 men, something similar to the previous Battle of Poitiers. There were also Castilians loyal to Peter, about 400 English archers recruited by John of Gaunt, some Aragonese unhappy with their king and the troops of King James IV of Majorca.

In August 1366, King Peter of Castile, the Prince of Wales, and King Charles II of Navarre met in Bayonne, to agree on the terms of an invasion. The King of Navarre would allow the invading army passage from Aquitaine to Castile through Navarre, for which he would be well paid. Peter, who was willing to accept all conditions, was also to reimburse the expenses of the army recruited by the Prince of Wales and offer Castilian territories to be annexed to his duchy of Aquitaine.

Henry had dismissed almost all his troops, because of the tremendous expense that led him to keep his mercenary army in the rise to power. These troops roamed Castile committing outrages or changed sides. Henry came to an agreement with King Charles II of Navarre that Charles would, in exchange for a reward, block the Pyrenean pass from France to Castile, something that could be done easily with a few men. Charles was either betting on two horses or feared facing Castile and Aragon.

In February 1367, the English mercenaries of Hugh Calveley, who remained in the peninsula and worked for Henry, switched sides and overran several towns of Navarre from the south in a chevauchée. This forced the King of Navarre (Charles II) to open the way for the army of the Black Prince and to provide 300 men for their cause, a minimal amount to pretend he was on their side. To avoid to go to the battle in person, the King of Navarre faked his own capture during a hunt in collusion with captain Olivier de Mauny, cousin of Bertrand Du Guesclin, the Lieutenant of Henry's army.

When Henry heard of the entrance of the Black Prince's army to the peninsula he enlisted all the troops he could and sent Bertrand Du Guesclin immediately from Zaragoza back to Castile with his best captains, although most of their forces had to stand to protect Aragon from the Black Prince's army. No more than 1,000 French men-at-arms reinforced Henry's army along with some Aragonese nobles. From the mountains, Biscay, Gipuzkoa and Asturias came footsoldiers but they did not participate in the battle.

=== Army strength ===
The commonly accepted version among historians is the version of the chronicles of Pedro Lopez de Ayala in which the army of Peter, supported by the Black Prince, consisted of more than 10,000 men, most of them the best mercenaries that could be found in Europe, and the army of Henry had 4,500 men of which 1,000 were elite mercenaries from France.

Another source is the unreliable chronicle of Jean Froissart, known for his Anglophilia, whose data should not be taken too seriously in this battle, because he was not even in Spain at that time. According to Froissart, the Castilian-French army had 76,000 men. Some British historians have raised the numbers to 86,000 men. According to Froissart the Anglo-Castilian army had 24,000 men.

Froissart was present in person at Bordeaux at the close of 1366, so that for the negotiations preceding the war we can compare the accounts of two eyewitnesses; but for the actual expedition and for the battle of Nájera he has so obviously drawn his materials from the Herald Chandos that his corroboration ceases to be of much value as evidence. The Spanish historian Ayala was present in the opposite camp and affords exceedingly useful information, but is naturally less well informed as to the proceedings of Peter's army than of that of his rival; while the work of another eyewitness, a Latin poem on the battle of Nájera by Walter of Peterborough, monk of Revesby, although interesting, is very much confused, and is coloured throughout by a desire to enhance excessively the glory of its hero, the Duke of Lancaster.

— Mildred Pope and Eleanor Constance Lodge

=== Previous encounters ===
During March, despite his huge disadvantages, Henry had great success using guerrilla tactics and skirmishing against the army of the Black Prince. Castilian troops had great offensive power and greater mobility thanks to their lighter armament, something that made them ideal for this type of action, unlike the slow and heavily armored army of Peter, composed mainly of heavy infantry and heavy cavalry. He was an experienced soldier, having fought in France as a great company commander against the English and knew that the best military strategy to take on the huge army of the Black Prince, was to wear it down with the harsh Castilian lands, hunger and the skirmishes. These were also the recommendations of the King of France and of Bertrand du Guesclin. The light cavalry was an old tradition in Castilian military systems and was designed for the frequent skirmishes with the Moors, even though the idea had been abandoned by other European armies of that time.

In the small Battle of Aríñez (Basque, battle of Inglesmendi, Battle of the English Mount) in the third week of March 1367, a vanguard of Henry's army formed by jinetes (Castilian light cavalry) led by Don Tello and Aragonese and French knights led by Arnoul d'Audrehem, Pierre le Bègue de Villaines and Juan Ramírez de Arellano wiped out a detachment of the Black Prince's army. Henry's vanguard easily defeated groups ahead of the bulk of the army of the Black Prince by skirmishes and then headed back to their base. On their way, they met with an exploration detachment of the Black Prince's army, which was led by the Seneschal of Aquitaine Sir Thomas Felton with 200 men-at-arms and archers. After suffering many casualties, the detachment of the Prince of Wales entrenched in the mountain of Inglesmendi, where the English longbowmen resisted the Castilian light cavalry. The French and Aragonese soldiers dismounted and attacked as infantry, defeating them. There died, among others, Sir William Felton, Seneschal of Poitou and captain of great companies; many others were captured, Thomas Felton, the captain of great companies, Richard Taunton, Sir Hugh Hastings, the military Lord John Neville, the captain of great companies Aghorises and the Gascon mercenary captain of great companies Gaillard Vighier (or Beguer), among others.

The army of the Black Prince that had hitherto been considered invincible, had suffered its first defeat and although their losses were not large in comparison with the large army, the troops began to become demoralized. The Black Prince mobilized his troops to approach Burgos—his goal—from Vitoria, but Henry stepped ahead and blocked his path which forced the army of Peter to retreat again. At the end of March the Black Prince crossed the Ebro at Logroño, where he made a camp. Henry again blocked access to Burgos by controlling the river Najerilla.

The political situation was quite different; more people adhered to the cause of Peter that gained strength, while his alliances weakened, because avoiding confrontation was seen as a sign of weakness by the Castilian nobility. Time was playing against the ambitious Henry, who advanced with his forces, leaving behind the protection of the river Najerilla to confront his half-brother. To prevent disaster, he had to face the most prominent mercenary troops of Europe, outnumbered, in a battle in the open and with the river in his back cutting his retreat, despite the opposition of Bertránd du Guesclin and the rest of his field commanders.

== Battle ==
According to Chandos Herald, p. 38, the Black Prince troops marched from Navarrete to Nájera taking a roundabout way at night and with the first lights of dawn quietly surprised from behind a hill the army of Henry (who were looking towards Navarrete in the east) from the northeast. The vanguard of Henry directed by du Guesclin maneuvered quickly to confront the enemy, but in the confusion and fear other lines were broken and some Castilian horsemen defected to the enemy followed by a larger group of infantry. This urged du Guesclin to abandon the defensive advantage and to charge with the vanguard -composed of the best Castilian troops and the French free companies - to prevent the situation from worsening. The charge forced the English companies of the vanguard of the Black Prince led by the Duke of Lancaster and John Chandos to go back. They were so close that both sides dropped their spears and began using swords, axes, and daggers.

Meanwhile, the elite mercenary Gascon companies who were in the right and left wings started to flank the vanguard led by du Guesclin. The Castilian light cavalry of Don Tello approached the opposite wing of the enemy to prevent the flanking at the forefront of du Guesclin but had to suffer terrible losses because of the rain of arrows of the English archers as they approached because they did not have the adequate protections and were forced to flee. Henry himself tried to succor the vanguard charging against the Gascon mercenaries several times from a side with similar results as the horses were easily killed by the English archers and fighting on foot was not an option because the Castilian cavalry considered it a humiliation.

Once the elite Gascon mercenaries flanked the vanguard of Henry's army commanded by du Guesclin, it was quickly crushed and most of the main body that did not even participate in the battle fled precipitately toward the bridge of Najera as they were being attacked from two fronts, ignoring the harangues of Henry. The Aragonese cavalry of Jaime IV of Majorca chased and killed most of them, as they got trapped in their retreat by the great river and the narrow bridge.

Henry's army had to suffer the vast majority of their losses, which must have been a total of more than half of the army, in the last minutes of the battle. Later on the Black Prince's army would finish off those who were hidden in Najera and pillaged the whole town, killing most of the inhabitants.

== Aftermath ==
After the battle, the Black Prince asked if Henry had been killed or captured. Upon receiving negative response, he stated in the Gascon dialect, "non ay res fait" (nothing then is done). Indeed, despite capturing or killing most of the rival army and suffering only light losses, the eventual consequences of this battle were catastrophic for King Peter, for the Black Prince, for Aquitaine and for England, since they had missed their real target, Henry himself:

- By facing up to such a magnificent enemy army in the open field, Henry proved himself to be a strong and courageous leader to both the Castilian nobility and his allies. He further managed to escape across the Pyrenees mountains to France and continued the fight against his brother Peter.
- Before long, all the nobles and men-at-arms who had fought alongside Henry and been captured by the mercenary armies of the Black Prince would manage to pay their ransom and return to face Peter the Cruel, for which they were generously rewarded at the end of the war.
- The Black Prince did not receive any reimbursement from Peter I for the huge sums of money needed to hire such an army, nor the territories that had been agreed in Bayonne, either because King Peter was still immersed in the war against his brother or because he had never meant to pay in the first place (although Peter did write letters to the cities demanding money so he could pay the Prince). Consequently, relations between King Peter I of Castile and the Prince of Wales came to an end and Castile and England broke off their alliance, with the result that Peter I could no longer count on England's support. This breakdown would bring about a political and economic disaster and astronomical losses for the Black Prince after a campaign full of hardships, and is probably what ended his brilliant military career, embittering him up until his death in 1376.
- King Peter would become isolated internationally and was murdered at the hands of his brother two years later in the Battle of Montiel in 1369.
- France, aware of its own weakness, managed to avoid direct confrontation with England, and after promoting the new and definitive ascent of King Henry II to the Castilian Crown, found an important ally in Castile in its struggle against England that was to last for a century .
- England and Aquitaine's fear of a France allied with Castile – a powerful adversary in possession of the largest war fleet in the Atlantic – would lead, five years later, to the Battle of La Rochelle, resulting in the destruction of an entire English fleet.

== Sources ==
- Ainsworth, Peter; Croenen, Godfried (2013) [2010], "Jean Froissart: Chronicler, Poet and Writer", The Online Froissart (1.5 ed.), archived from the original on 2016-07-01.
- Ayala, Pero López de; Amirola, Llaguno (1779), Cronicas de los Reyes de Castilla Don Pedro, Don Enrique II, Don Juan I, Don Enrique III, por D. Pedro López de Ayala,... con las enmiendas del secretario Gerónimo Zurita y las correcciones y notas añadidas por Don Eugenio de Llaguno Amirola,... (in Spanish), Don A. de Sancho, p. 453.
- Froissart, Sir Jean (1857), "Chapter CCXLI — The Battle of Navarretta ...", Chronicles Of England, France, Spain, And The Adjoinoing Countries, vol. 1, translated by Johnes, Thomas (Two volumes ed.), London: H.G. Bohn, p. 370, OCLC 392656).
- Herald, Chandos (1910), Pope, Mildred Katharine; Lodge, Eleanor Constance (eds.), The Life of the Black Prince by the Herald of Sir John Chandos, Oxford: Clarendon Press, OCLC 459194094.
- Sumption, Jonathon (2001), The hundred years war: Trial by fire, vol. 2, London: Faber & Faber, ISBN 0-571-20737-5.
