= Felton baronets =

Extinct baronetcy in the Baronetage of England

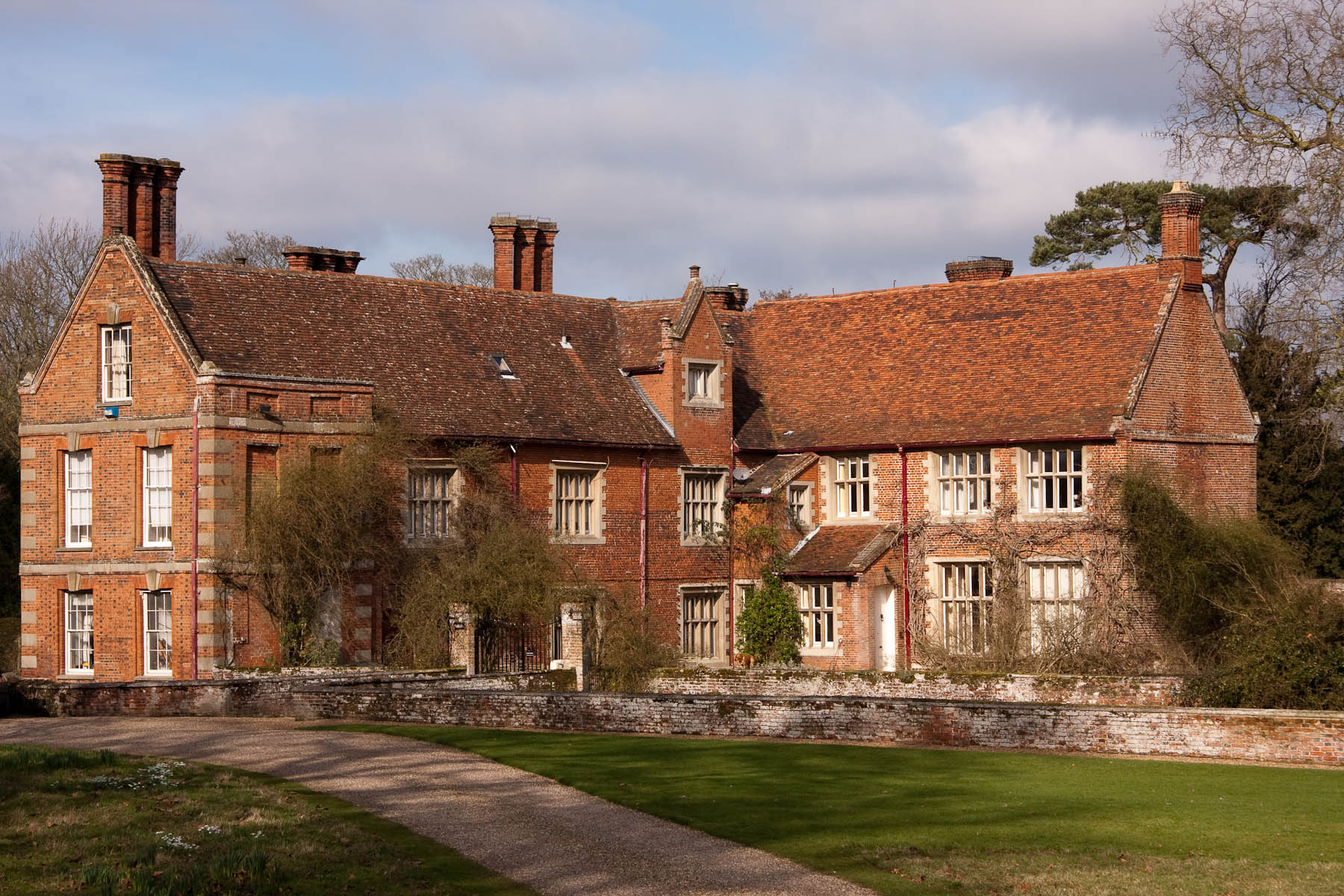
Playford Hall

The Felton baronetcy, of Playford in the County of Suffolk, was a title in the Baronetage of England. It was created on 20 July 1620 for Henry Felton. The second Baronet sat as member of parliament for Suffolk. The third Baronet was member of parliament for Orford. The fourth Baronet was member of parliament for Orford and Bury St Edmunds. The title became extinct on the death of the fifth Baronet in 1719.

== Felton baronets, of Playford (1620) ==
- Sir Henry Felton, 1st Baronet (died 1624)
- Sir Henry Felton, 2nd Baronet (1619–1690)
- Sir Adam Felton, 3rd Baronet (died 1697)
- Sir Thomas Felton, 4th Baronet (1649–1709)
- Sir Compton Felton, 5th Baronet (c. 1650–1719)
