= HMS Edlingham =

Minesweeper of the Royal Navy

History

United Kingdom
- Name: HMS Edlingham
- Namesake: Edlingham
- Builder: William Weatherhead & Sons, Cockenzie
- Launched: 21 July 1955
- Completed: 16 September 1956
- Fate: Destroyed by fire 29 September 1956. Wreck sold 1957.

General characteristics
- Class & type: Ham class minesweeper
- Type: Minesweeper
- Displacement: 120 long tons (122 t) standard; 164 long tons (167 t) full load
- Length: 100 ft (30 m) p/p; 106 ft 6 in (32.46 m) o/a
- Beam: 21 ft 4 in (6.50 m)
- Draught: 5 ft 6 in (1.68 m)
- Propulsion: 2 shaft Paxman 12YHAXM diesels; 1,100 bhp (820 kW)
- Speed: 14 knots (16 mph; 26 km/h)
- Complement: 2 officers, 13 ratings
- Armament: 1 × Bofors 40 mm L/60 gun or Oerlikon 20 mm cannon
- Notes: Pennant number(s): M2623 / IMS25

HMS Edlingham was one of 93 ships of the Ham-class of inshore minesweepers.

Their names were all chosen from villages ending in -ham. The minesweeper was named after Edlingham in Northumberland.
