= Edlingham =

Village in Northumberland, England

Coordinates: 55.37499°N 1.82399°W

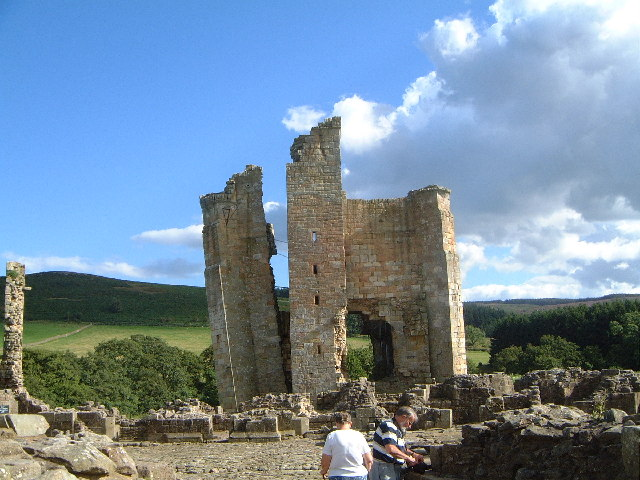
- Edlingham Castle

- Location within Northumberland
- Population: 191 (2011 census)
- OS grid reference: NU105095
- Unitary authority: Northumberland
- Ceremonial county: Northumberland
- Region: North East
- Country: England
- Sovereign state: United Kingdom
- Post town: ALNWICK
- Postcode district: NE66
- Police: Northumbria
- Fire: Northumberland
- Ambulance: North East
- UK Parliament: North Northumberland

Edlingham is a small village and civil parish in Northumberland in the north of England. At the 2001 census it had a population of 196, which had reduced slightly to 191 at the 2011 Census. The road to Alnwick passes close by the village and the town of Rothbury is about 6 miles (10 km) away.

The name Edlingham means The home of Eadwulf in Anglo-Saxon. Its recorded history goes back as far as 737 when King Coelwulf gave Edlingham and three other royal Northumbrian villages to Cuthbert.

== Landmarks ==
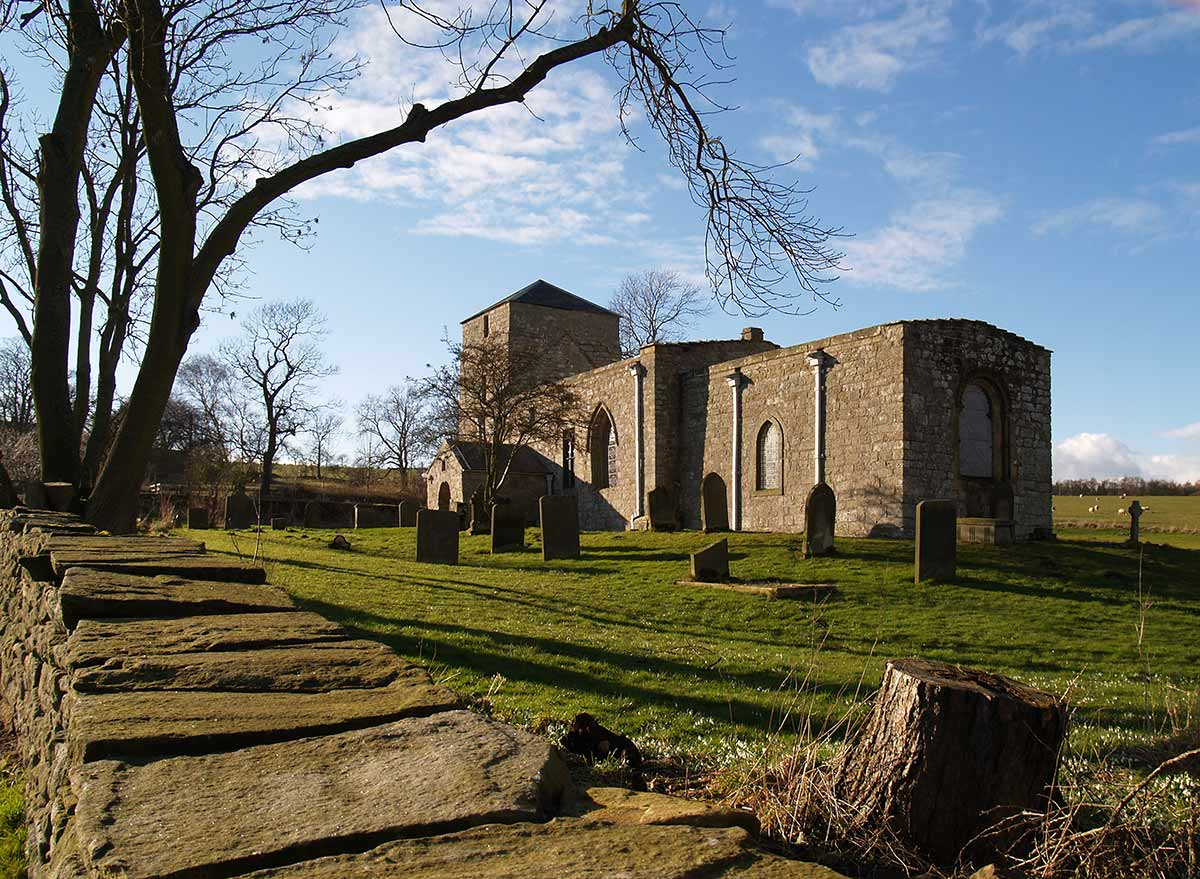
St John the Baptist, Edlingham

St. John the Baptist's Church dates largely from the 11th and 12th centuries, with a remarkable fortified tower added c.1300.

Situated close to the church, Edlingham Castle has its origins in a house built by John de Edlingham in the 12th century, which was subsequently strengthened and fortified over the next three centuries. In the 15th century the castle had a moat, gate tower and strong palisade. However, agricultural requirements overtook the need for defence over the following 200 years, and after 1514 the buildings were let to local tenant farmers for housing animals and crops, and fell into disrepair. By 1650 the castle was abandoned and over the next 300 years the theft of stonework left the building in ruins. Excavations were started in 1978 by English Heritage to make the remaining masonry safe for visitors.

The Devil's Causeway passes the western edge of the village. The causeway is a Roman road which starts at Port Gate on Hadrian's Wall, north of Corbridge, and extends 55 miles (89 km) northwards across Northumberland to the mouth of the River Tweed at Berwick-upon-Tweed.

== Notable people ==
- Sir Henry Manisty (1808 – 1890), a barrister and judge, was born at vicarage house
- Richard White (1509-1558), Merchant Taylor and MP for York was born in the village.

== See also ==
- Edlingham railway station, open 1887 – 1930.
- HMS Edlingham, a Ham class minesweeper, named after the village.
