= Edlingham Castle =

Grade I listed castle in Northumberland, England

- Northumberland, England
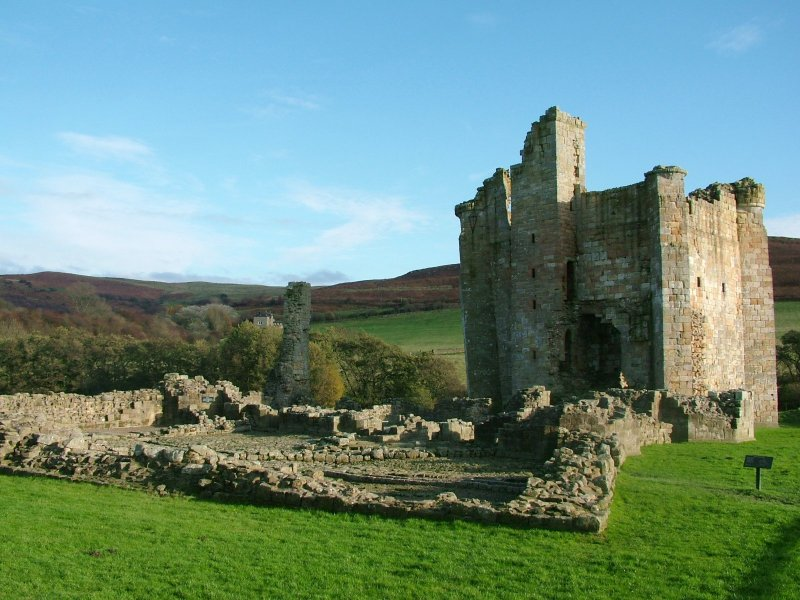
- Edlingham Castle

Site information
- Type: Castle
- Controlled by: English Heritage
- Open to the public: Yes

Location
- Coordinates: 55.376755°N 1.818420°W

Edlingham Castle is a small castle ruin, having scheduled monument and Grade I listed building status, in the care of English Heritage. It is located in a valley to the west of Alnwick, Northumberland, England. It has been described as "...one of the most interesting in the county", by Nikolaus Pevsner, the architectural historian. Edlingham itself is little more than a hamlet with a church alongside the castle.

The ruins are mostly laid low, though much of the solar tower still stands despite an impressive crack running several storeys down to ground level. The foundations and part of the walls of the hall house, gatehouse, barbican and other courtyard buildings are still visible, most dating from the 16th century.

The castle – more properly a fortified manor house typical of many medieval houses in the North of England – guards one of the few approaches to Alnwick through the hills to its west. Its fortifications were increased in response to the border warfare which raged between England and Scotland in the period from about 1300 to 1600.

== History ==
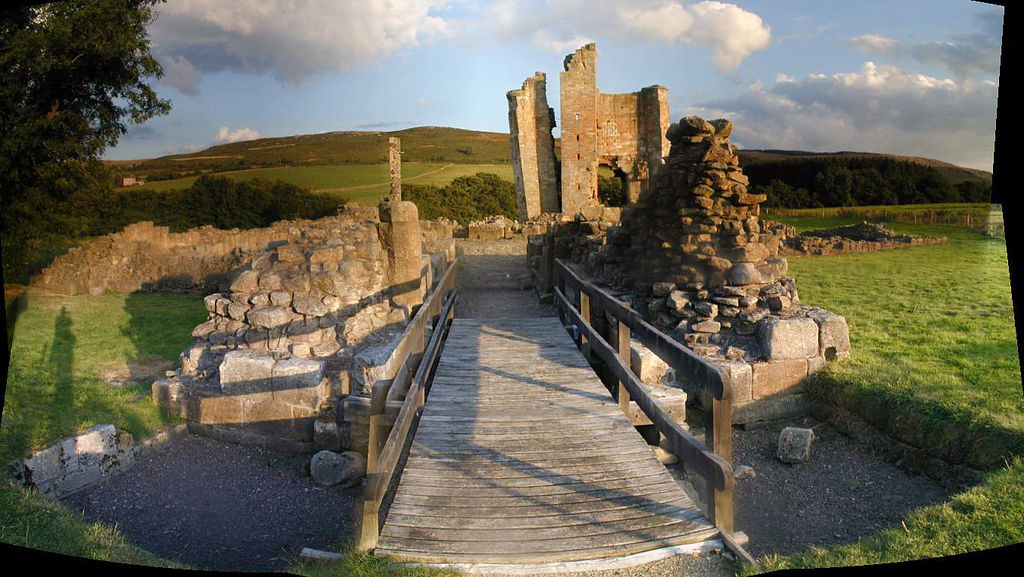
View of Edlingham Castle ruins from the gatehouse

By 1174, a John of Edlingham owned a manor house at this location. In 1294, a descendant, Walter of Edlingham, sold it to William de Felton. He strengthened it by building strong ramparts and a gatehouse, fortifying the main hall, and adding other buildings inside a courtyard. In 1396 Elizabeth de Felton inherited it, marrying Sir Edmund Hastings, who added a strong solar tower. Their descendants occupied the castle and estate until 1514. It was purchased by George Swinburne, a constable of Prudhoe, whose family held it until the 18th century.

During this time it gradually fell into disrepair, with most of the buildings dismantled in the 1660s to build nearby farmhouses, but leaving the solar tower intact. In 1978 the Department for the Environment acquired the site and conducted extensive archaeological excavations, prior to which rubble filled the solar tower to a height of three metres.

The site is now in the care of English Heritage and is easily accessible from the nearby church of St John the Baptist, Edlingham. William de Felton is buried there. An interpretation board is on-site, while more detailed leaflets are available from the church for a small donation.
