= St John the Baptist, Edlingham =

Church in Northumberland, England

St John the Baptist
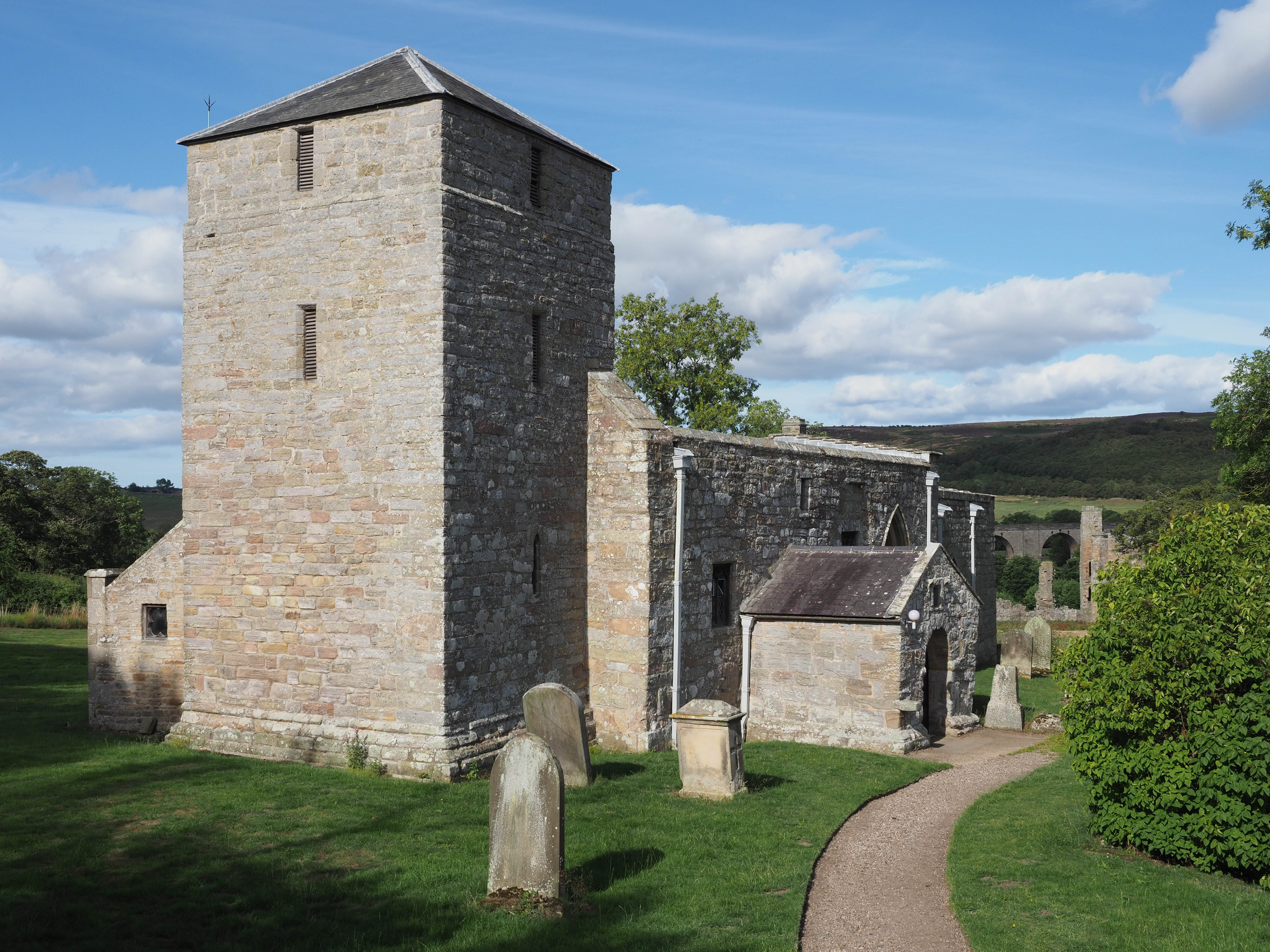

- St John the Baptist shown within Northumberland
- 55.3760°N 1.8210°W
- OS grid reference: NU113091
- Location: Garden Terrace, Edlingham, Northumberland NE66 2BN
- Country: England
- Denomination: Anglican

History
- Status: Parish church

Architecture
- Functional status: Active

St John the Baptist is a mediaeval (11th century) church in Edlingham in the English county of Northumberland. The church is mostly Norman, from two periods, the late 11th – early 12th century and late 12th century. The chancel arch and the south porch, with its rare Norman tunnel vault, are late 11th century, and the north aisle arcade is from the late 12th century. The columns are circular and the capitals are scalloped with bands of nail-head. The defensible west tower may also have been begun in the late 12th century, but completed later.

The church is adjacent to Edlingham Castle, a 13th-century castle with 16th-century battlements and defences.
