= Seneschal of Poitou =

The Seneschal of Poitou was an officer carrying out and managing the domestic affairs of the lord of the County of Poitou. During the course of the twelfth century, the seneschalship, also became an office of military command.

Originally, the seneschal managed the comital household, coordinating between the receivers of various landholdings and the chamber, treasury, and the chancellery or chapel. From 1138, the office was converted into that of a vice-regent governing the county in the absence of the count. In that year, King Louis VII of France, who had become count by marriage to the countess, Eleanor of Aquitaine, appointed the hereditary seneschal William de Mauzé to govern the county in his absence. The seneschals of Poitou, like those appointed in Normandy, Gascony, and Anjou had custody of demesne fortresses, the regional treasuries, and presidency of the highest court of regional custom.

== List of Seneschals ==
- William de Mauzé (1138)
- Geoffrey de la Celle (1201)
- Savari de Mauléon (1205) - first appointment
- Robert of Thornham (1207)
- Hubert de Burgh (1212–?)
- Geoffrey de Neville (1215)
- Reginald of Pons (1215–?)
  - Philip of Oldcoates (1220) - died while en route
- Savari de Mauléon (1220?) - second appointment
- Eustache de Beaumarchais (1268–1276)
- Philippe de Rémi (1284-1287)
- Jean de Lille (1349)
- William Felton (1360)
- John Chandos (1369)
