= Margarita, Álava =

Hamlet in Álava, Spain

Margarita
- Concejo
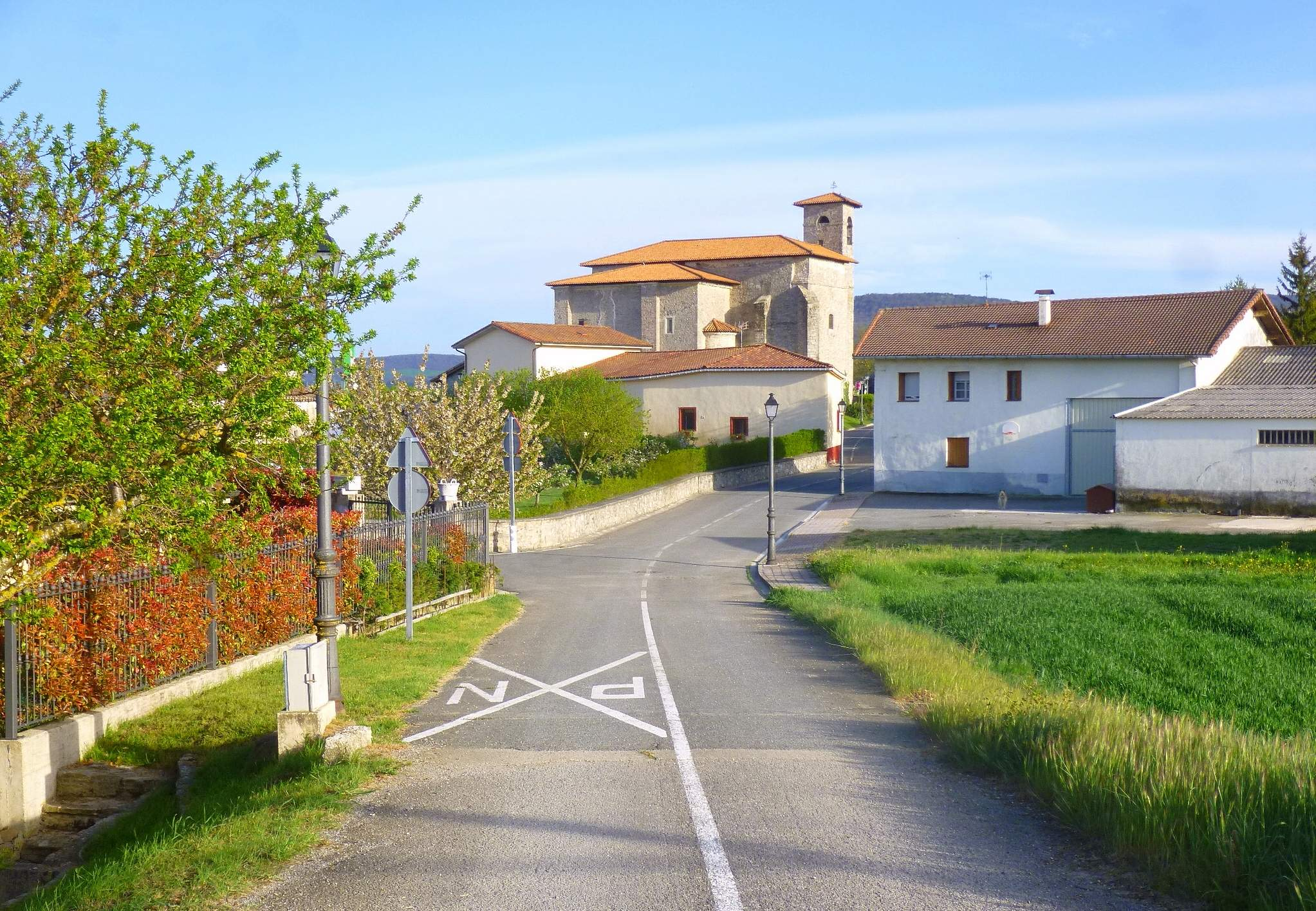
- View of Margarita

- Coat of arms

- Location within Álava Location within the Basque Country Location within Spain
- Coordinates: 42°51′N 2°45′W
- Country: Spain
- Autonomous community: Basque Country
- Province: Álava
- Comarca: Vitoria-Gasteiz
- Municipality: Vitoria-Gasteiz
- Elevation: 506 m (1,660 ft)

Population (2021)
  - Total: 36
- Postal code: 01195

Margarita (Basque pronunciation: [marɣaɾita], Spanish pronunciation: [maɾɣaˈɾita]) is a hamlet and concejo located in the municipality of Vitoria-Gasteiz, in Álava province, Basque Country, Spain.
