= Aubrey Porter =

English politician

Aubrey Porter (c.1660–1717) was one of the two MPs for Bury St Edmunds between 1705 and 1717.
