= Playford Hall =

- Location within Suffolk
- 52.082948°N 1.2291893°E
- Location: Playford, Suffolk, England

History
- Built: Elizabethan

Listed Building – Grade II*
- Official name: Playford Hall and Attached Revetments Around The Most Inner Bank of The Enclosing Moat
- Designated: 16 March 1966
- Reference no.: 1377295

Scheduled monument
- Official name: Playford Hall moated site
- Designated: 3 May 1994
- Reference no.: 1007672

Listed Building – Grade II
- Official name: Bridge and Revetments To The South Arm of The Moat Surrounding Playford Hall
- Designated: 25 January 1985
- Reference no.: 1030507

Playford Hall is a country house in the civil parish of Playford, in the East Suffolk district, in the county of Suffolk, England. Playford Hall is set in 30 acres, the gardens were designed in 1960 by Lady Penelope Aitken. Playford Hall is owned and occupied by the Melrose family and the grounds are sometimes opened to support charities. The house is a Grade II* listed building and the moated site is a scheduled monument.

== History ==
The house was built in the late 16th century, possibly 1597 for Anthony Felton. In 1813 Playford Hall was leased to Thomas Clarkson by Frederick, 5th Earl of Bristol. It had alternations in 1700 for Sir Thomas Felton and 1871 by Richard Makilwaine Phipson. Playford Hall was requisitioned during the Second World War. On 16 March 1966 Playford Hall was Grade II* listed as "Playford Hall and Attached Revetments Around The Most Inner Bank of The Enclosing Moat" though the bridge and revetments to the south arm of the moat were listed (as Grade II) separately as "Bridge and Revetments To The South Arm of The Moat Surrounding Playford Hall" on 25 January 1985. On 3 May 1994 the moated site became a scheduled monument.

Playford Bridge
