= Sir Thomas Felton, 4th Baronet =

English courtier and Whig politician

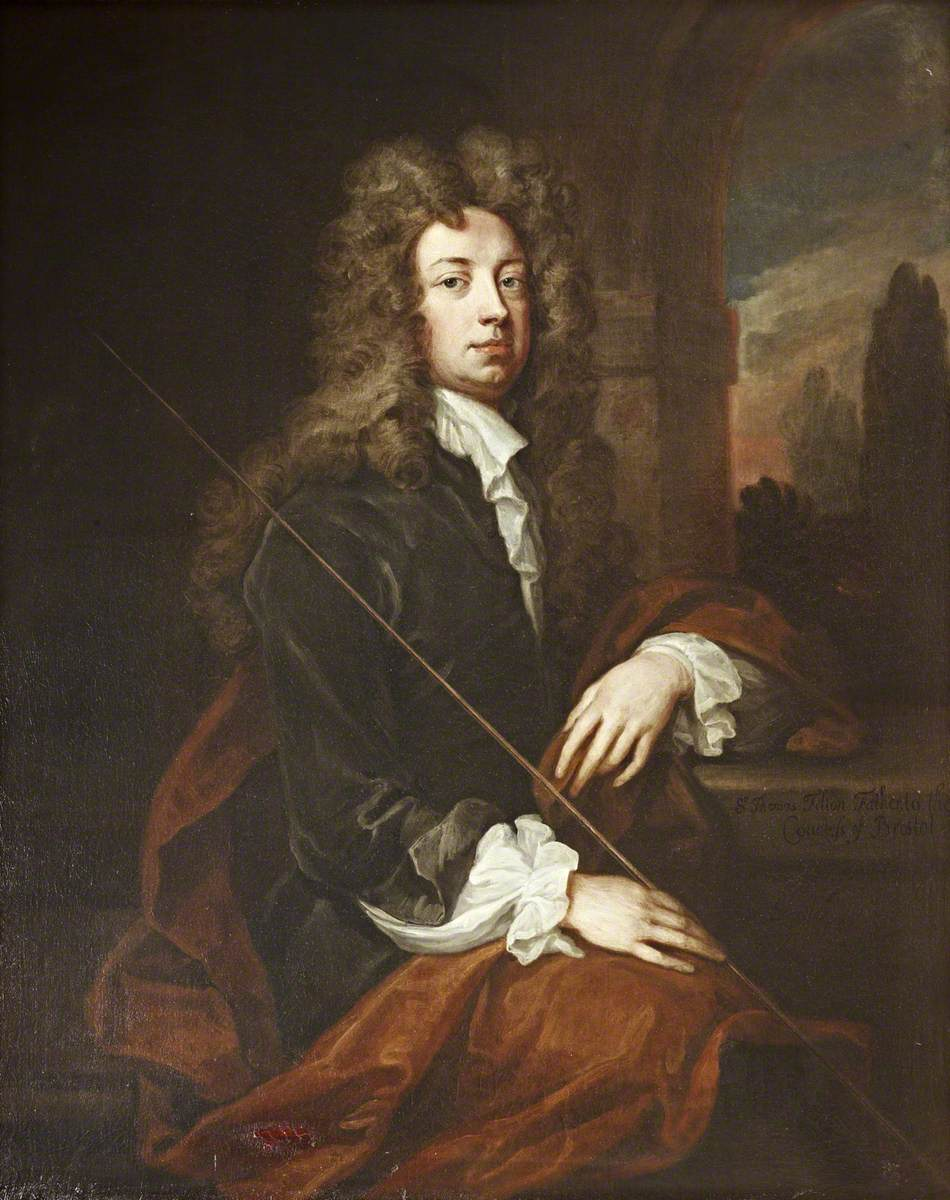
A portrait of Felton by Godfrey Kneller

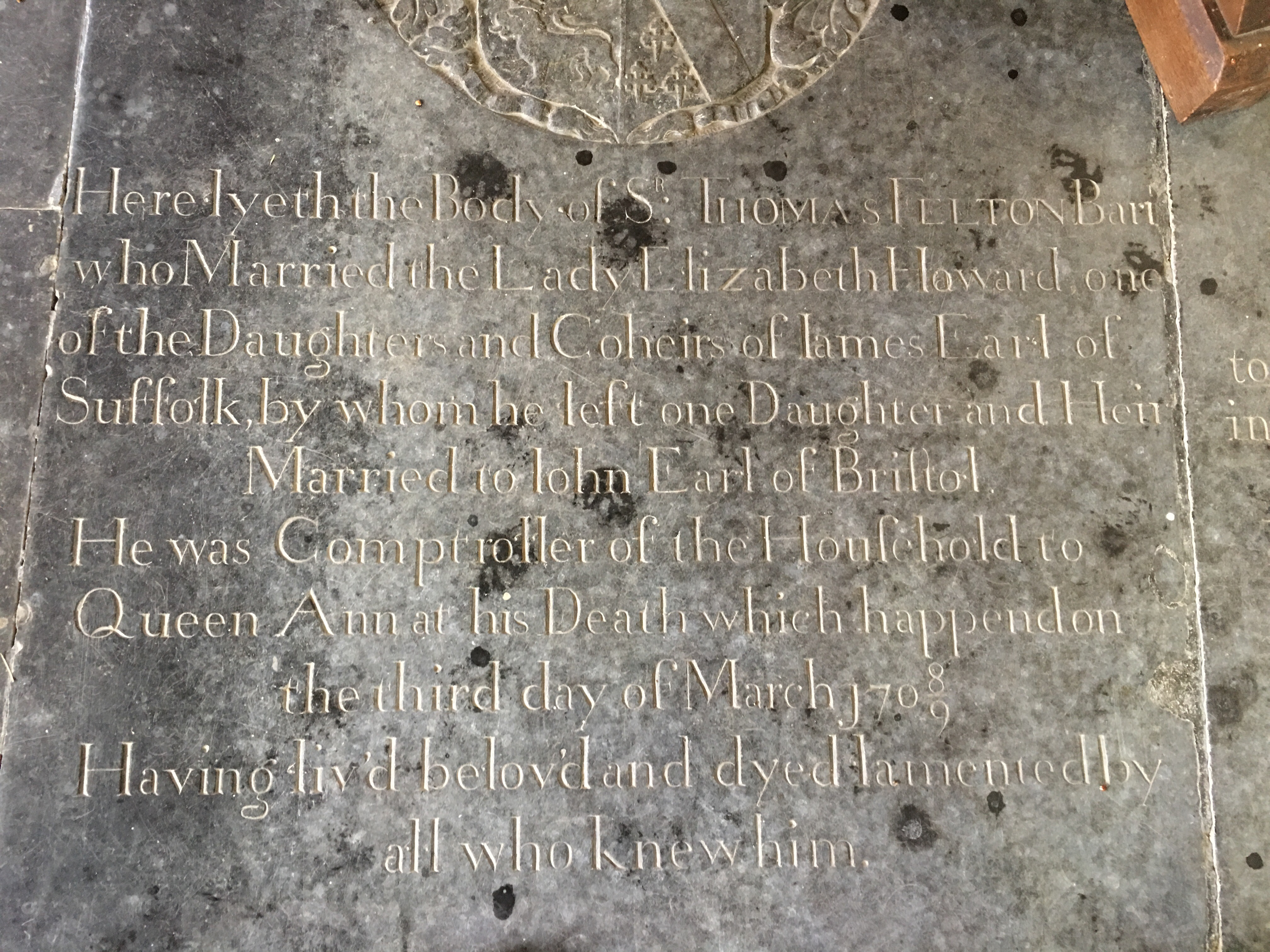
Felton's grave in the chancel of St Mary's Church in Playford, Suffolk

Sir Thomas Felton, 4th Baronet (12 October 1649 – 3 March 1709) was an English courtier and Whig politician who sat in the English House of Commons and British House of Commons from 1690 to 1709.

== Biography ==
He was the son of Sir Henry Felton, 2nd Baronet of Playford, Suffolk and his wife Susanna Tollemache, daughter of Sir Lionel Tollemache, 2nd Baronet, of Helmingham.

Felton was a Page of Honour from 1665 to 1671 and became Groom of the Bedchamber in March 1671. He was appointed Master of the Hawks in 1675. By 1679 he had left the post as Groom to King Charles through unknown circumstances. He had married Lady Elizabeth Howard, one of the daughters and coheirs of James Howard, 3rd Earl of Suffolk but she died in 1681. On the accession of William and Mary in 1689, Felton became Master of the Household.

He was returned as Member of Parliament for Orford at the 1690 English general election. He was returned for Orford unopposed at the 1695 English general election. In 1697, he succeeded his elder brother in the baronetcy. By 1698, he had become unpopular. At the 1698 English general election he stood for Suffolk where he was heavily defeated and for Orford again where he was returned in a fierce contest. The result was disputed and he was unseated on petition on 10 February 1700. At the first general election of 1701 he was defeated at Orford, and at the second general election of 1701 he stood instead at Bury St Edmunds on the interest of his son-in-law John Hervey and was returned as MP in a contest. He was returned at Bury St Edmunds in a contest in 1702 and unopposed in 1705. At the 1708 British general election, he was returned again for Bury St Edmunds and was also promoted to Comptroller of the Household to Queen Anne.

Felton died at his lodgings in Whitehall from gout in the stomach on 3 March 1709. He was buried six days later at St Mary's church Playford, where his gravestone lies in the chancel. His daughter Elizabeth married John Hervey, 1st Earl of Bristol.

Parliament of England
Preceded by Thomas Glemham; Sir John Duke	Member of Parliament for Orford; 1690–1701; With: Thomas Glemham 1690-1695; Sir Adam Felton 1695-1697; Sir John Duke 1697-1698; Sir Charles Hedges 1698-1701	Succeeded by Sir Edmund Bacon; William Johnson
Preceded by John Hervey; Sir Robert Davers, Bt	Member of Parliament for Bury St Edmunds; 1701–1707; With: Sir Robert Davers, Bt 1701-1705; Aubrey Porter 1705-1707	Succeeded by Parliament of Great Britain
Parliament of Great Britain
Preceded by Parliament of England	Member of Parliament for Bury St Edmunds; 1707–1709; With: Aubrey Porter	Succeeded by Aubrey Porter; Joseph Weld
Baronetage of England
Preceded by Adam Felton	Baronet (of Playford); 1697–1709	Succeeded by Compton Felton
