= William Felton (died 1367) =

Sir William Felton (died 1367) and English knight and seneschal of Poitou. Took part in Battle of Halidon Hill, 1333 and fought at the Battle of Crecy in 1346. He was appointed lord justice of all the king's lands in Scotland in 1348. He fought at battle of Poitiers in 1356. He was appointed seneschal of Poitou in 1360. He accompanied the Black Prince on the Spanish campaign in 1367 and was called Felleton Guilliam qui ot cœur de lyon by Chandos Herald. He was killed at the Battle of Inglesmendi (also called the Battle of Aríñez) a skirmish fought by the vanguard of the Black Prince's army.

== Biography ==
Felton was the son of Sir William Felton of Northumberland (died c. 1358), and his first wife. (Note: Sir William was descended in the fourth generation from Roger or Robert Fitz-Pagan or Felton, brother of the William Fitz-Pagan who was ancestor of Sir Thomas Felton (Fotheringham 1889, p. 311).) He owned the manors of Bodington, West Matsden, Edelyngham, and half of West Milburne, all in Northumberland.

Felton held important commands during the Second War of Scottish Independence. He took part in the Battle of Halidon Hill in 1333, and in the subsequent capture of Berwick-on-Tweed. In 1334 he was governor of Bamborough Castle in Northumberland. From 1338 to 1340 he was in command of Roxburgh Castle, which in April of the latter year he defended against an attack of the Scots. In 1340 he was also named a commissioner to attend to the defence of the Scottish marches.

Felton was summoned to Edward III's 24th parliament in 1343. In 1348 he was named lord justice of all the king's lands in Scotland. He was appointed sheriff of Northumberland and governor of the town of Newcastle-on-Tyne both in 1342 and 1343.

When Edward III sought to detach the Flemings from their allegiance to France, Felton accompanied him to Hainault. During the following year he was at the naval Battle of Sluys (24 June 1340) and at the Siege of Tournay.

In the winter of 1343 Felton followed the king to Brittany at the start of War of the Breton Succession, and was at the Siege of Nantes. He was with the expedition which invaded Normandy in 1346, and took part in the battle of Crécy and the subsequent campaign in the north of France. He was with the Black Prince at the Battle of Poitiers.

In 1359 Felton was at the siege of Rheims, which the English were forced to raise and retreat to Brittany. While there Felton went to attack the Pontorson Castle, commanded by Bertrand du Guesclin. He was defeated and taken prisoner. Shortly after Duguesclin became a hostage to Jean de Montfort, and was entrusted to Felton. Duguesclin, riding out one day with Felton's young son, escaped to Guingamp, and thence sent a message to De Montfort exonerating Felton from any connivance at his departure, with a challenge appended to all who might assert that he had thereby broken his word of honour. Felton wished to accept, but the combat was forbidden.

In May following the French signed the Treaty of Brétigny, in which Felton was named one of the commissioners to receive and take formal possession of the territories ceded to the English. At this time he became seneschal of Poitou. Many documents addressed to him in this capacity which relate to the protracted negotiations of this period are to be found in Rymer's ‘Fœdera.’ In 1364 and 1365 he was engaged in numerous military actions in Guyenne.

Felton accompanied the Black Prince in his campaign into Spain to restore Don Pedro to the throne of Castile. Chandos Herald, who was also with this expedition, of which he has written an account in a rhymed chronicle in French, makes frequent mention of Felleton Guilliam qui ot cœur de lyon. He was killed on 19 March 1367 at the battle of Inglesmendia skirmish before the battle of Navarrete, in which his kinsman Sir Thomas Felton was taken prisoner. The heroic resistance of a handful of Englishmen and the rash bravery of Felton seem to have struck the imagination of the people of the country, where the recollection of this feat of arms is still to be found in legend. Sir Arthur Conan Doyle depicted this battle in the finale of his historical novel The White Company (1891). In the 19th century, an antiquarian claimed that the mound near Ariñez in Alava on which the English fought was known in the local dialect as Inglesmundi (the Englishmen's mound), though this claim was possibly drawing on 18th century sources.

== Family ==
According to Davy, the Suffolk antiquary, Felton was married, but his wife's name is unknown. He had no surviving children because his estates passed to his half-brother Sir John Felton (c.1339-1396) and his nephews Sir Thomas Swinburne (c.1357-1412) and William Hilton (the future Lord Hilton).
