= Philip of Oldcoates =

12th and 13th-century English sheriff and royal official

Sheriff of Northumberland
- In office 1212 – February 1220

Personal details
- Died: shortly before 19 November 1220
- Spouse: Johanna

Philip of Oldcoates (or Philip Oldcoates, Philip de Ulcotes, Philip de Ulecot; died 1220) was an English nobleman and royal official.

== Royal service ==
Philip first appears in the historical record in 1194 when he was deprived of his lands at Tickhill in South Yorkshire, because he supported Prince John of England, who had rebelled against his elder brother King Richard I of England. When Prince John became king in 1199, Philip was given lands in Northumberland. Philip was captured in 1206 at Chinon Castle in France while in royal service. On his return to England from his captivity, the king rewarded him by making him one of the administrators of the vacant bishopric of Durham. This was a lucrative appointment as well as putting Philip in charge of a strategic location in Northern England. He was also in charge of the isle of Guernsey, as he was supplied with provisions by Geoffrey fitzPeter, the justiciar. Philip served John as a soldier and as Sheriff of Northumberland in 1212. He was given custody of Bamburgh Castle and Newcastle Castle, two royal castles. During the civil war at the end of John's reign, Philip remained loyal to the king and in early 1216 held Durham Castle against the rebels.

When John was succeeded by his underage son Henry III, Philip continued to be sheriff and to serve as a royal official. He lost his shrievalty in February 1220 and control of Mitford Castle in Northumberland in June 1220.

== Death and legacy ==
In late 1220, Philip was sent to Poitou in western France as seneschal, but he died before 19 November 1220 while on his way to take up that office.

Philip married Johanna, the daughter of Robert de Meinil, early in John's reign. He paid the king a fine of 100 pounds and a warhorse for the marriage. He had no legitimate offspring, and his heirs were his five sisters.

Roger of Wendover included Philip in his list of King John's "most wicked counsellors" in Roger's entry for 1211 in his chronicle Flores Historiarum, and this judgement was echoed by Matthew Paris in Paris's continuation of the Flores.
