= Aríñez =

Hamlet in Álava, Spain

Ariñiz/Aríñez
- Concejo
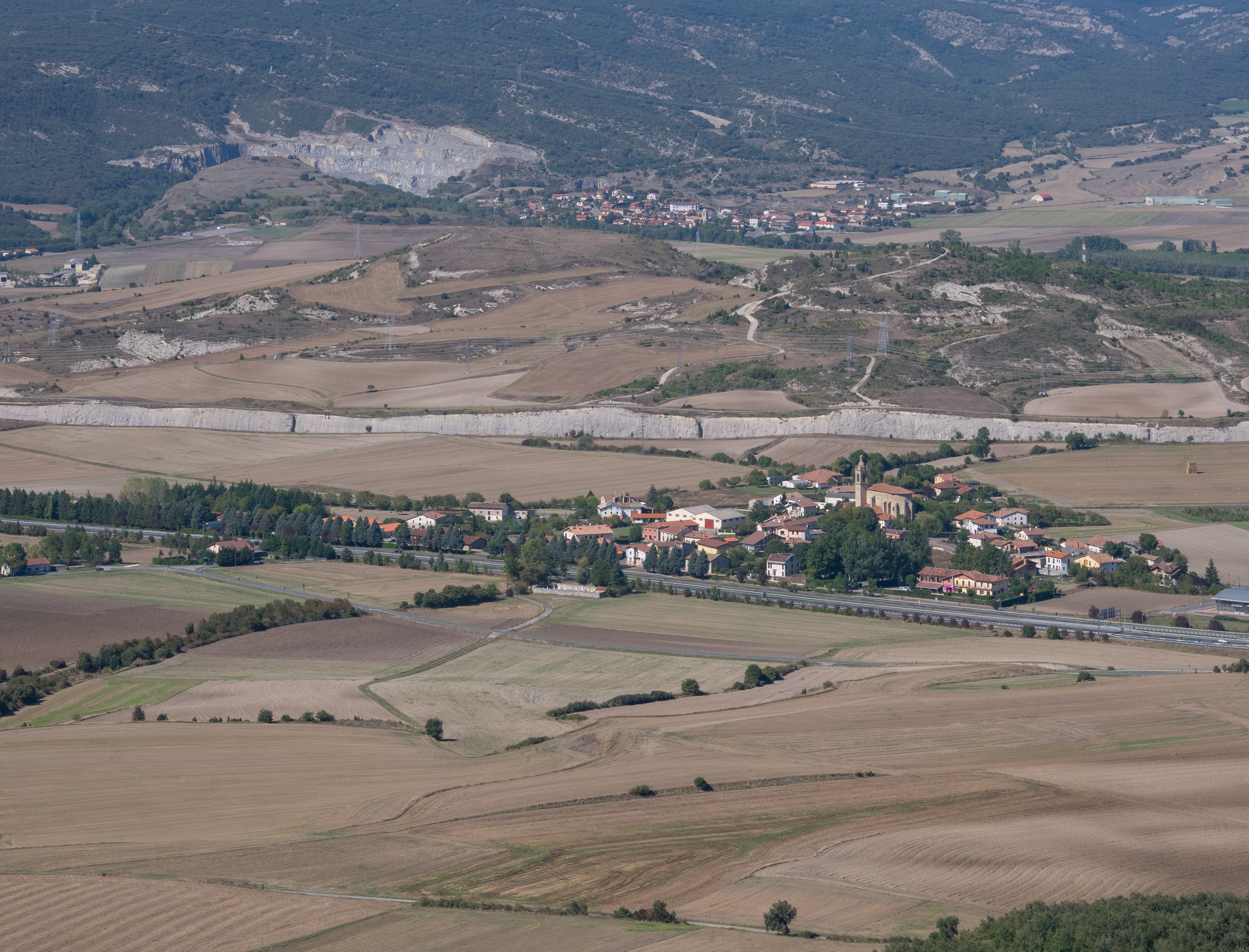
- View of Aríñez

- Coat of arms

- Location within Álava Location within the Basque Country Location within Spain
- Coordinates: 42.8278°N 2.7531°W
- Country: Spain
- Autonomous community: Basque Country
- Province: Álava
- Comarca: Vitoria-Gasteiz
- Municipality: Vitoria-Gasteiz
- Elevation: 538 m (1,765 ft)

Population (2023)
  - Total: 112
- Postal code: 01195

Aríñez (Spanish pronunciation: [aˈɾiɲes]) or Ariñiz (Basque pronunciation: [aɾiɲis̻]) is a hamlet and concejo in the municipality of Vitoria-Gasteiz, in Álava province, Basque Country, Spain.

Aríñez lies 8.5 kilometres (5.3 mi) west of Vitoria-Gasteiz, next to the N-102 road, a branch of the A-1 (Madrid-Irún) expressway. Its most representative building is the parish church, dedicated to San Julián and Santa Basilisa, which combines the Renaissance and Baroque styles. These saints' celebrations take place on 9 January, and celebrations in honor of Saint Thomas take place on 21 December.

Until 1928, when it was absorbed by Vitoria, Aríñez was a municipality which also included the nearby hamlets of Margarita and Eskibel.
