= Arnoul d'Audrehem =

14th century French nobleman

- Arms of Arnoul d'Audrehem: Bandee azure and argent, a bordure gules.
- Died: 1370

Arnoul d'Audrehem (c. 1305 – 1370) was a Marshal of France, who fought in the Hundred Years' War.

== Biography ==
He was born at Audrehem, in the present arrondissement of Saint-Omer, in the département of Pas-de-Calais. Nothing is known of his career before 1332, when he is heard of at the court of Philip VI of France.

Between 1332 and 1342 he went three times to Scotland to aid King David Bruce in his wars. In 1342 he became captain for the king of France in Brittany; then he seems to have served in the household of the duke of Normandy, and in 1346, as one of the defenders of Calais, was taken as a prisoner to England by Edward III.

From 1349 he held an important place in the military history of France, first as captain in Angoulême, and in June 1351, in succession to the lord of Beaujeu, as marshal of France. In March 1352 he was appointed lieutenant for the king in the territory between the Loire and the Dordogne, in 1353 in Normandy, and in 1355 in Artois and Picardy and the Boulonnais.

It was Audrehem who arrested Charles II of Navarre and his partisans, at the banquet given by the dauphin (later Charles V of France) at Rouen in 1356. At Poitiers he was one of those who advised John II of France to attack the English, and, charging into the front line of the French army, was slightly wounded and taken prisoner.

From England he was several times given safe-conduct to France, and he took an active part in the negotiations for the Treaty of Brétigny, recovering his liberty at the same time as king John. In 1361, as the king's lieutenant in Languedoc, he prevented the free companies from seizing the castles, and negotiated the treaty with their chiefs under which they followed Henry, count of Trastámara (later Henry II of Castile), into Spain.

In 1365 he joined Bertrand du Guesclin in the expedition to Spain, and was taken prisoner with him by Edward, the Black Prince at the Battle of Nájera (Navarette) in 1367.

The Black Prince recalled that he had accepted d'Audrehem parole after the battle of Poitiers and released him after d'Audrehem had giving his word that he would not bear arms against the Prince until his ransom was paid. When the Prince saw him he reproached him bitterly, and called him "liar and traitor". D'Audrehem denied that he was either, and the prince asked him whether he would submit to the judgment of a body of knights. To this d'Audrehem agreed, and after he had dined the prince chose twelve knights, four English, four Gascons, and four Bretons, to judge between himself and the marshal. After the Prince had stated his case, d'Audrehem replied that he had not broken his word, for the army the Prince led was not his own; he was merely in the pay of Peter of Castile. The knights considered that this view of the prince's position was sound, and gave their verdict for d'Audrehem. However he was unable to pay his ransom until 1369.

In 1368, on account of his age, he was relieved of the office of marshal, being appointed bearer of the oriflamme, with a pension of 2,000 livres.

He was sent to Spain in 1370 by Charles V of France to urge his friend du Guesclin to return to France, and in spite of his age he took part in the Battle of Pontvallain (December 1370), but fell ill and died, probably at Saumur, in the latter part of December 1370.
