= Chandos Herald =

14th-century Anglo-Norman poet

Chandos Herald (fl. 1360s–1380s) for Chandos le héraut is the name used to refer to the author of a poem about the life of The Black Prince in Anglo-Norman language. He is so-called because he was the herald of the English warlord John Chandos, the Black Prince's closest friend.

The poem's language indicates that Chandos Herald came from Hainaut. The poem was written sometime between 1376 and 1387. It details many of the Prince's exploits in the Hundred Years' War, including the Castilian civil war, the battle of Crecy, and the battle of Poitiers (though these last two only briefly). This has led to the suggestion that the poem was originally intended to laud the prince's exploits in Spain, but after his death was extended to cover his whole career.

After the death of John Chandos in 1370, the Herald entered royal service, and was made the King of Arms of England by Richard II at his coronation in 1377.
