= Gurdon (surname) =

Gurdon is a surname, and may refer to:

- Adam de Gurdon (died 1305), English knight
- Al Gurdon, British broadcast lighting designer
- Bertram Gurdon, 2nd Baron Cranworth (1877–1964), British peer and soldier
- Bertrand Evelyn Mellish Gurdon (1867–1949), British soldier and administrator
- Brampton Gurdon (of Assington and Letton) (died 1649), Member of Parliament for Sudbury (1621) and High Sheriff of Suffolk
- Brampton Gurdon (of Letton) (1606–1669), his son, Member of Parliament for Sudbury (1645–1653) and a cavalry colonel in the English Civil War
- Brampton Gurdon (lecturer) (died 1741), Archdeacon of Sudbury, fellow of Caius College, Cambridge and Boyle lecturer
- Brampton Gurdon (Norfolk MP) (1797–1881), British politician
- Charles Gurdon (1855–1931), English barrister, judge, rower and rugby union footballer
- Edward Temple Gurdon (1854–1929), English rugby union footballer
- Francis Gurdon (1861–1929), Anglican bishop
- John Gurdon (1933–2025), British developmental biologist
- John Gurdon (died 1623) (c.1544–1623), English landowner and politician
- John Gurdon (died 1679) (1595–1679), English politician
- John Everard Gurdon (1898–1973), British flying ace
- Madeleine Gurdon (born 1962), English equestrian
- Norah Gurdon (1882–1974), Australian artist
- Philip Gurdon (1800–1874), English cricketer
- Robert Gurdon, 1st Baron Cranworth (1829–1902), British politician
- Temple Gurdon (British Army officer) (1896–1959), British Army officer
- Thornhagh Gurdon (1663–1733), English antiquary
- William Gurdon (cricketer) (1804–1884), English judge and cricketer
- William Brampton Gurdon (1840–1911), British civil servant and politician

== See also ==
- Gardon (surname)
- Gordon (surname)
