= Philip Gurdon =

English cricketer and priest

Personal information
- Born: 26 June 1800; Letton, Norfolk, England
- Died: 1 August 1874 (aged 74); Cranworth, Norfolk

Domestic team information
- Years: Team
- 1820: Norfolk
- 1822: Cambridge University
- Source: CricketArchive, 24 March 2013

Philip Gurdon (26 June 1800 – 1 August 1874) was an English cricketer who played for Norfolk and Cambridge University. He is recorded in two matches, totalling 16 runs with a highest score of 9.

Gurdon was educated at Eton College, then went up to Trinity College, Cambridge, but after two years he moved to Downing College. After graduating he was ordained as a Church of England priest and was rector of parishes in Norfolk near his family's home at Letton Hall from 1825 until his death in 1874. He held the following appointments:

- Rector, Reymerston 1825–1874
- Rector, Southburgh 1828–1874
- Rector, Hatton 1829
- Rector, Cranworth with Letton, 1832–1874

== Works ==
A Selection of Psalms and Hymns compiled from different authors for the use of his parishioners, by the Rector of Cranworth, in Norfolk (East Dereham: H. C. Wigg). 1849; second ed. 1851

== Bibliography ==
- Haygarth, Arthur (1862). Scores & Biographies, Volume 1 (1744–1826). Lillywhite.
