= Adam de Gordon =

Adam de Gordon may refer to:

- Adam de Gurdon (died 1305)
- Adam de Gordon, Lord of Gordon (died 1333)
- Adam de Gordon (died 1402)

== See also ==
- Adam Gordon (disambiguation)
