= Bouwerie Lane Theatre =

- Bouwerie Lane Theatre (Bond Street Savings Bank)
- U.S. National Register of Historic Places
- U.S. Historic district – Contributing property
- New York State Register of Historic Places
- New York City Landmark
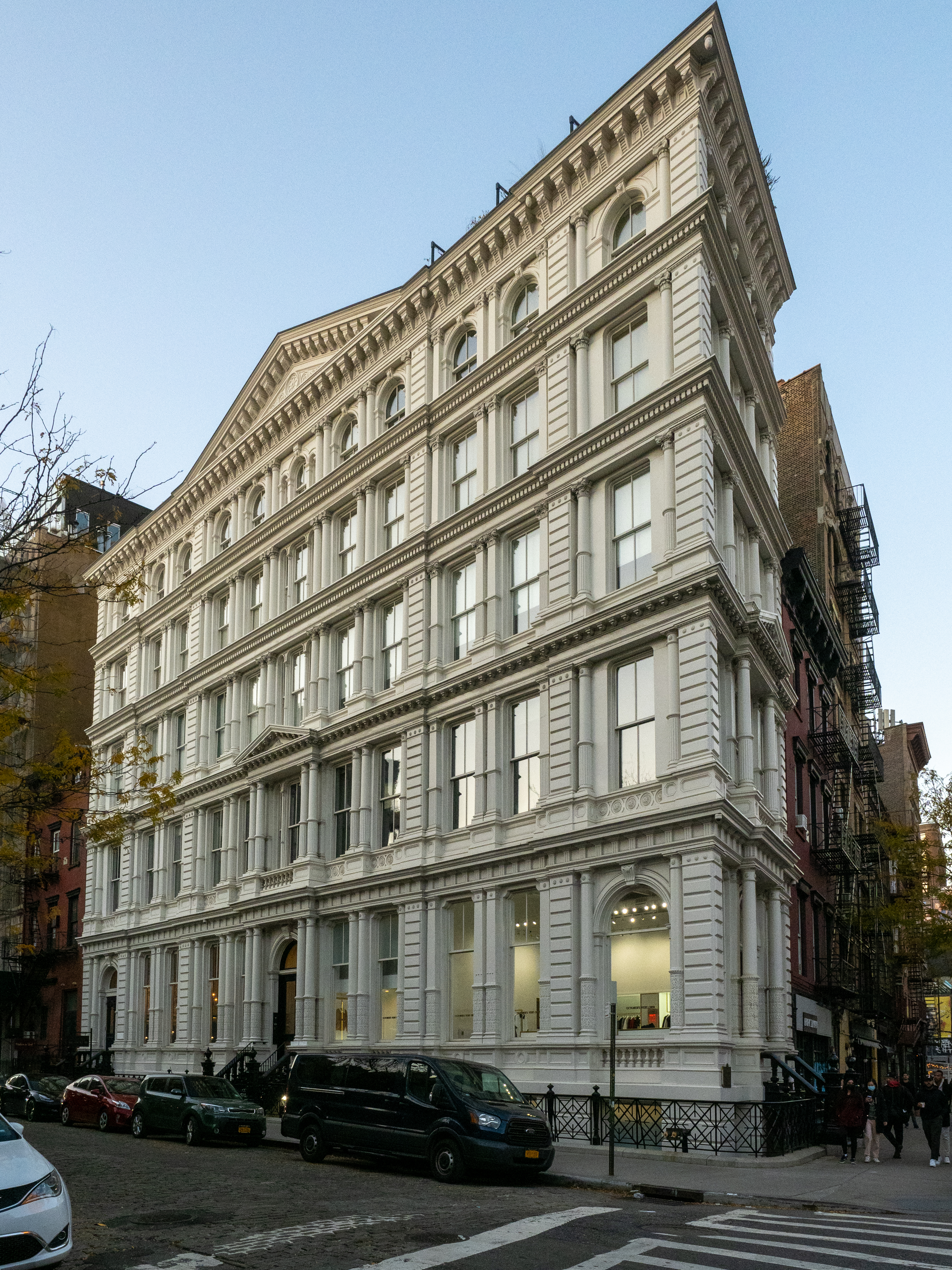

- Location within Lower Manhattan Location within New York Location within the United States
- Location: Manhattan, New York City, New York
- Coordinates: 40°43′32″N 73°59′32″W
- Built: 1874
- Architect: Henry Engelbert
- Architectural style: French Second Empire
- Part of: The Bowery Historic District (ID13000027)
- NRHP reference No.: 80002671
- NYSRHP No.: 06101.000100
- NYCL No.: 0192

Significant dates
- Added to NRHP: April 23, 1980
- Designated CP: February 20, 2013
- Designated NYSRHP: June 23, 1980
- Designated NYCL: January 11, 1967

The Bouwerie Lane Theatre is a former bank building which became an Off-Broadway theatre, located at 330 Bowery at Bond Street in Manhattan, New York City. It is located in the NoHo Historic District. The cast-iron building, which was constructed from 1873-1874, was designed by Henry Engelbert in the Italianate style for the Atlantic Savings Bank, which became the Bond Street Saving Bank before the building was completed. When the bank failed in 1879, the building was sold to the German Exchange Bank, which served the German immigrant community. Prior to the 1960s, the building was used for the storage of fabrics.

In 1963, the building was converted into a theater by Honey Waldman, who produced several plays there. From 1974 to 2006, it was the home of the Jean Cocteau Repertory Theatre. Among the many plays and musicals that were produced at the theatre, the first was The Immoralist (1963) with Frank Langella, Dames at Sea (1968), Night and Day (2000) by Tom Stoppard, Brecht's The Threepenny Opera (2003), and the Cocteau's final production, Jean Genet's The Maids X 2 (2006). The building was purchased by Adam Gordon in 2007 for conversion into a private mansion (with a climbing wall) for his family, and the Bowery frontage used for retail.

In 1967, the building was designated a New York City landmark, and it was added to the National Register of Historic Places in 1980. The AIA Guide to New York City calls it "One of the most sophisticated cast-iron buildings."

== See also ==
- National Register of Historic Places listings in Manhattan below 14th Street
- List of New York City Designated Landmarks in Manhattan below 14th Street
