= Assington (Sherborn, Massachusetts) =

Historic house in Massachusetts, United States

- U.S. National Register of Historic Places
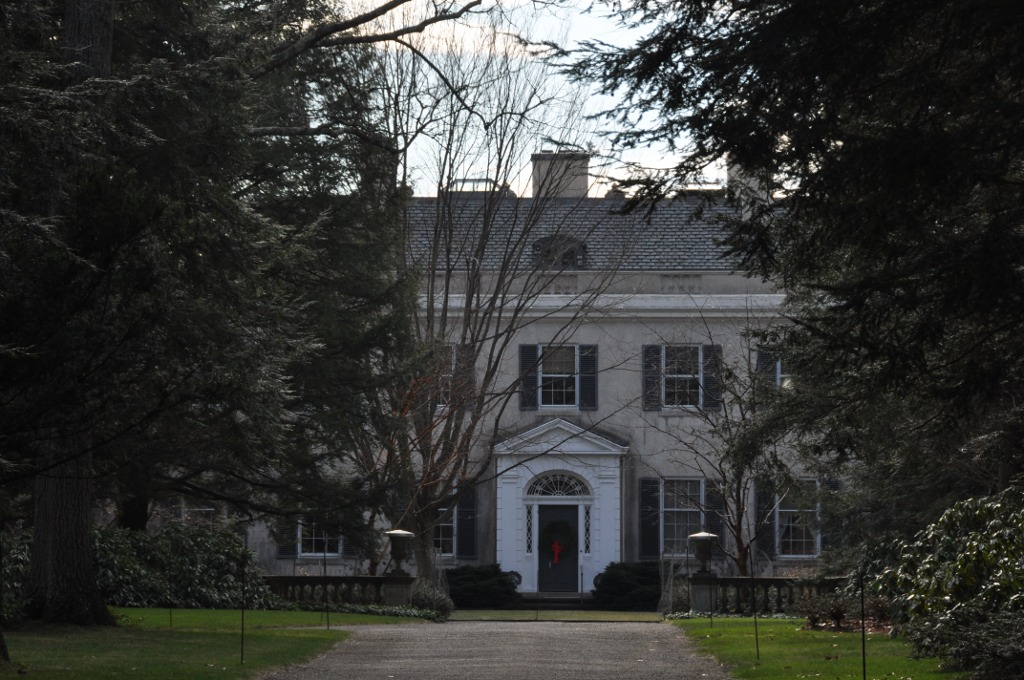

- Location within Massachusetts Location within the United States
- Location: 172 Forest St., Sherborn, Massachusetts
- Coordinates: 42°13′41″N 71°20′30″W
- Area: 30 acres (12 ha)
- Built: 1929–1930
- Architect: William T. Aldrich
- MPS: Sherborn MRA
- NRHP reference No.: 86000490
- Added to NRHP: January 3, 1986

Assington is a historic residence in Sherborn, Massachusetts. Built in 1929–30 for an investment banker, it was the last, and also the grandest estate to be built in the town. The property was listed on the National Register of Historic Places on January 3, 1986.

== Description and history ==
Assington is located on the south side of Forest Street in rural eastern Sherborn, between the Rocky Narrows Reservation and Farm Road. The estate is set on 30 acres (12 ha) of mostly woods, with a winding drive leading south from the road to the main house. The house is set on a rise overlooking the Charles River, and features an allee from the south lawn down to the Charles. The main house is a large 2 1/2-story structure, finished in stucco and covered with a balustraded slate roof. The main block is 7 bays wide, with an enclosed and pedimented entry that is flanked by sidelight windows and topped by a fanlight. To the east is a large wing, and an arcaded porch runs along the west side. The south facade faces the river, and has a bowed central section that rises to interrupt the roof's balustrade. Outbuildings on the property include a caretaker house, tea house, and service structures.

Assington was built in 1929–1930 for George and Muriel Saltonstall Lewis, to designs by architect William Truman Aldrich (1880–1966). Aldrich in his design sought to emulate the design and setting of English country houses, and worked with New York City-based landscape designer Inno Chenti. The estate is named for the Gurdon estate in Assington, Suffolk, although its design more closely resembles Heaton Hall in Manchester. The allee leading down to the river faces the estate of Leverett Saltonstall, Muriel's brother. George Lewis was an investment advisor for a Boston investment firm.

The portion of the original estate, fronting on the Charles, was given by the Lewises to The Trustees of Reservations, and is now part of the Rocky Narrows Reservation.

== See also ==
- National Register of Historic Places listings in Sherborn, Massachusetts
