= Gardon (surname) =

Gardon is a French surname. Gardoň (feminine: Gardoňová) is a Czech surname. Notable people with the surname include:

- Bernard Gardon (born 1951), French footballer
- Elouan Gardon (born 2006), American cyclist
- Olivier Gardon (born 1950), French classical pianist
- Radek Gardoň (born 1969), Czech ice hockey player

== See also ==
- Gordon (surname)
- Gurdon (surname)
