= Listed buildings in Assington =

Civil Parish in Suffolk, England

Assington is a village and civil parish in the Babergh District of Suffolk, England. It contains 32 listed buildings that are recorded in the National Heritage List for England. Of these one is grade I and 31 are grade II.

This list is based on the information retrieved online from Historic England.

== Key ==
| Grade | Criteria |
|---|---|
| I | Buildings that are of exceptional interest |
| II* | Particularly important buildings of more than special interest |
| II | Buildings that are of special interest |

== Listing ==
| Name | Grade | Location | Type | Completed (Note: The date given is the date used by Historic England as significant for the initial building or that of an important part in the structure's description.) | Date designated | Grid ref. (Note: The grid reference is based on the British national grid reference system, sometimes known as OSGB36, used by the Ordnance Survey.) Geo-coordinates | Notes | Entry number (Note: The "List Entry Number" is a unique number assigned to each listed building and scheduled monument by Historic England.) | Image | Wikidata |
|---|---|---|---|---|---|---|---|---|---|---|
| Partridge Row | II | 50-55 | | | 9 February 1978 | TL9357537468; 52°00′07″N 0°49′07″E | | 1036691 | Upload Photo | Q26288370 |
| Aveley Hall | II | | | | 9 February 1978 | TL9447539563; 52°01′13″N 0°49′58″E | | 1351716 | Upload Photo | Q26634795 |
| Barn to the South of Moor's Farmhouse | II | | | | 9 February 1978 | TL9298836648; 51°59′41″N 0°48′35″E | | 1036734 | Upload Photo | Q26288414 |
| Church of St Edmund | I | | church building | | 23 March 1961 | TL9357438796; 52°00′50″N 0°49′10″E | | 1036733 | Church of St Edmund More images | Q17541776 |
| Cootes Cottage | II | | | | 10 January 1953 | TL9335937432; 52°00′06″N 0°48′56″E | | 1036692 | Upload Photo | Q26288371 |
| Mill Farmhouse | II | | | | 18 December 2002 | TL9354136864; 51°59′47″N 0°49′04″E | | 1096028 | Upload Photo | Q26388323 |
| Moor's Farmhouse | II | | | | 9 February 1978 | TL9296536672; 51°59′42″N 0°48′33″E | | 1194037 | Upload Photo | Q26488672 |
| Shamrock Farmhouse | II | | | | 9 February 1978 | TL9421437664; 52°00′12″N 0°49′41″E | | 1036690 | Upload Photo | Q26288369 |
| Stables and Coach House to Former Assington Hall | II | Assington Park | | | 21 August 1978 | TL9336438824; 52°00′51″N 0°48′59″E | | 1276815 | Upload Photo | Q26566300 |
| Dorking Tye Cottage | II | Bures Road | | | 9 February 1978 | TL9204036654; 51°59′42″N 0°47′45″E | | 1036693 | Upload Photo | Q26288372 |
| Kiln Cottage | II | Bures Road | | | 9 February 1978 | TL9285036892; 51°59′49″N 0°48′28″E | | 1351736 | Upload Photo | Q26634812 |
| Assington House | II | Colchester Road | | | 10 January 1953 | TL9455538190; 52°00′29″N 0°50′00″E | | 1036695 | Upload Photo | Q26288374 |
| Diljack's Farmhouse | II | Colchester Road | | | 9 February 1978 | TL9432438111; 52°00′27″N 0°49′48″E | | 1351737 | Upload Photo | Q26634813 |
| The Glebe House | II | Colchester Road | | | 9 February 1978 | TL9405838764; 52°00′48″N 0°49′35″E | | 1036694 | Upload Photo | Q26288373 |
| Barn to the North West of Dorking Tye House | II | Dorking Tye | | | 9 February 1978 | TL9191336719; 51°59′45″N 0°47′38″E | | 1351738 | Upload Photo | Q26634814 |
| Dorking Tye House | II | Dorking Tye | | | 9 February 1978 | TL9195636681; 51°59′43″N 0°47′41″E | | 1036696 | Upload Photo | Q26288375 |
| 81, Dyers Lane | II | 81, Dyers Lane | | | 9 February 1978 | TL9281939677; 52°01′19″N 0°48′32″E | | 1036697 | Upload Photo | Q26288377 |
| Park Farmhouse | II | Dyers Lane | | | 9 February 1978 | TL9254439422; 52°01′11″N 0°48′17″E | | 1194116 | Upload Photo | Q26488745 |
| Farend | II | Further Street | | | 9 February 1978 | TL9289539771; 52°01′22″N 0°48′36″E | | 1036700 | Upload Photo | Q26288381 |
| The Old Farmhouse | II | Further Street | | | 9 February 1978 | TL9303739652; 52°01′18″N 0°48′43″E | | 1036699 | Upload Photo | Q26288380 |
| The Round House | II | Further Street, CO10 5LE | | | 9 February 1978 | TL9345239395; 52°01′09″N 0°49′04″E | | 1036698 | Upload Photo | Q26288379 |
| Willow Farmhouse | II | Further Street | | | 10 January 1953 | TL9299639766; 52°01′22″N 0°48′41″E | | 1194124 | Upload Photo | Q26488755 |
| 10 and 11, the Street | II | 10 and 11, The Street | | | 9 February 1978 | TL9339838227; 52°00′32″N 0°48′59″E | | 1194181 | Upload Photo | Q26488811 |
| The Stores | II | 12, The Street | | | 9 February 1978 | TL9340238195; 52°00′31″N 0°48′59″E | | 1036704 | Upload Photo | Q26288385 |
| 13-17, the Street | II | 13-17, The Street | | | 9 February 1978 | TL9339838170; 52°00′30″N 0°48′59″E | | 1036705 | Upload Photo | Q26288386 |
| Nos 21 to 23 (consec) the Street | II | 21-23, The Street | | | 9 February 1978 | TL9339538120; 52°00′28″N 0°48′59″E | | 1194264 | Upload Photo | Q26488893 |
| Centuries | II | The Street | | | 9 February 1978 | TL9339437854; 52°00′20″N 0°48′58″E | | 1194136 | Upload Photo | Q26488767 |
| Hill Farmhouse | II | The Street | | | 9 February 1978 | TL9348638491; 52°00′40″N 0°49′04″E | | 1036703 | Upload Photo | Q26288384 |
| Hollies Cottage | II | The Street | | | 9 February 1978 | TL9342838246; 52°00′32″N 0°49′01″E | | 1036702 | Upload Photo | Q26288383 |
| K6 Telephone Kiosk | II | The Street | | | 6 December 1993 | TL9341538089; 52°00′27″N 0°49′00″E | | 1234037 | Upload Photo | Q26527464 |
| Shoulder of Mutton Public House | II | The Street | pub | | 9 February 1978 | TL9342838198; 52°00′31″N 0°49′01″E | | 1036701 | Shoulder of Mutton Public House More images | Q26288382 |
| The Hollies | II | The Street | | | 9 February 1978 | TL9342138262; 52°00′33″N 0°49′01″E | | 1285850 | Upload Photo | Q26574511 |

== See also ==
- Grade I listed buildings in Suffolk
- Grade II* listed buildings in Suffolk

== Sources ==
- Bettely, James; Pevsner, Nikolaus (2015) [1961], Suffolk: West, The Buildings of England, New Haven and London: Yale University Press, ISBN 978-0-300-19655-9
