= Adam Gordon =

Adam Gordon may refer to:

- Adam Gordon of Auchindoun (1545–1580), Scottish soldier
- Lord Adam Gordon (British Army officer) (1726–1801), Scottish soldier and politician
- Adam Gordon (Canadian politician) (1831–1876), Canadian politician
- Lord Adam Gordon (1909–1984), British royal courtier
- Adam Lindsay Gordon, Australian poet, jockey and politician
- Adam Gordon (businessman) (born 1960), American environmentalist and real estate developer

== See also ==
- Adam de Gordon (disambiguation)
- Gordon Adam, engineer
- Gordon Adam (rower)
