= Gurdon =

Gurdon can refer to:

== People ==
=== People with the surname Gurdon ===
- Gurdon (surname)
- Henry Gurdon Marquand (1819–1902), American financier, philanthropist and collector

=== People with the given name Gurdon ===
- Gurdon Buck (1807–1877), pioneer military plastic surgeon during the Civil War
- Gurdon Denison (1744–1807), physician and political figure in Nova Scotia
- Gurdon Wattles (1855–1932), early businessman, banker and civic leader in Omaha, Nebraska
- Gurdon Saltonstall (1666–1724), governor of the Colony of Connecticut
- Gurdon Saltonstall Hubbard (1802–1886), American fur trader
- Gurdon Saltonstall Mumford (1764–1831), United States Representative from New York
- Gurdon Woods (1915–2007), American sculptor, academic administrator

== Places ==
- Gurdon, Arkansas, a town in the United States
  - The Gurdon Light is an unexplained light located near railroad tracks in a wooded area of Gurdon, Arkansas

== Miscellaneous ==
- The Wellcome Trust / Cancer Research UK Gurdon Institute is a research facility at the University of Cambridge
