= John Gurdon (disambiguation) =

Sir John Gurdon (1933–2025) was a Nobel-winning biologist.

John Gurdon may also refer to:

- John Gurdon (died 1623), MP for Sudbury
- John Gurdon (died 1679), MP for Ipswich, Suffolk and Sudbury
- John Gurdon (died 1758), MP for Sudbury
- John Everard Gurdon (1898–1973), First World War flying ace
