= Thornhagh Gurdon =

English antiquarian

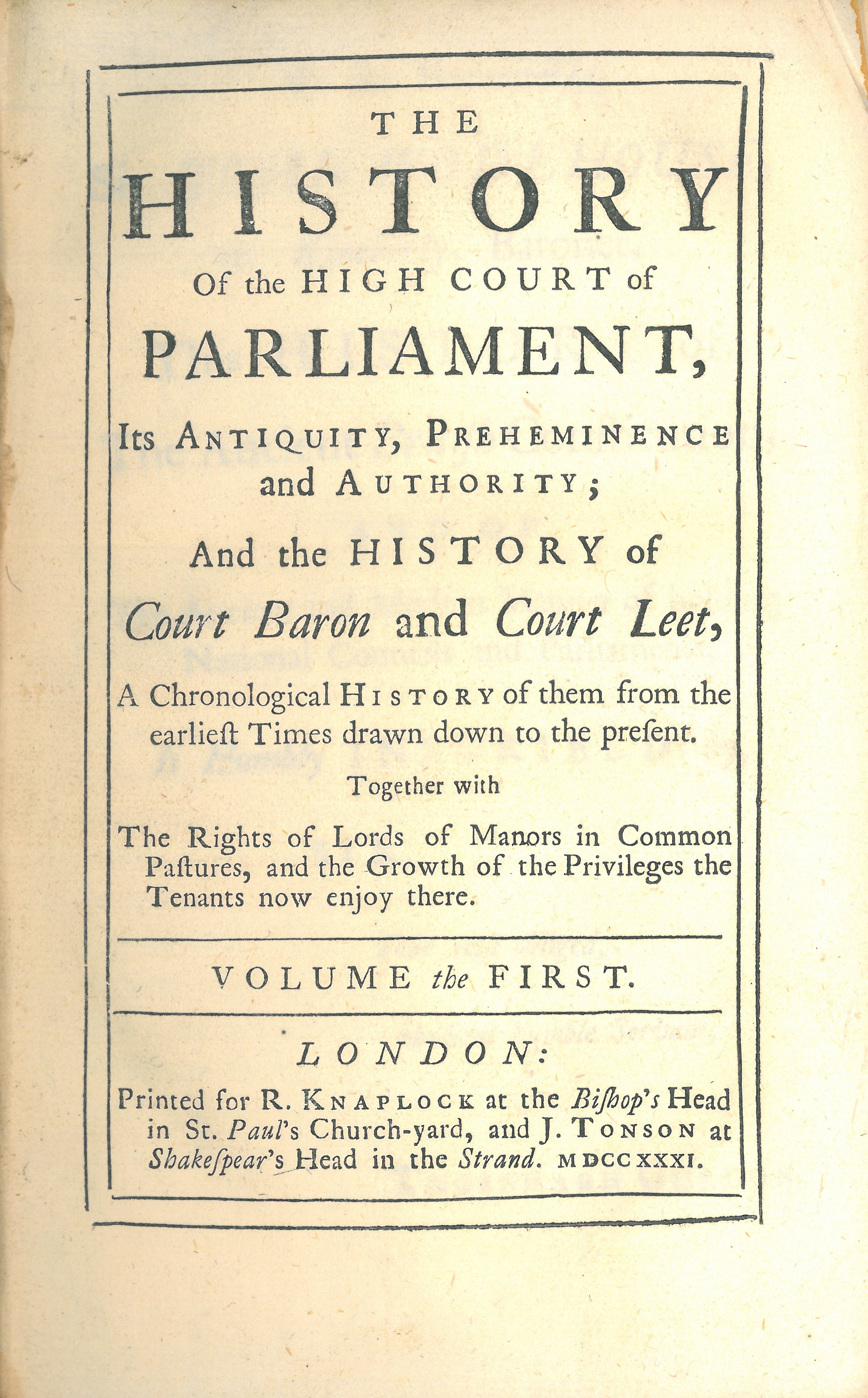
The title page of the first volume of Gurdon's The History of the High Court of Parliament (1st ed., 1731)

Thornhagh Gurdon, F.S.A. (1663 – November 1733) was an English antiquarian.

Gurdon, born in 1663, was the son of Brampton Gurdon of Letton, Norfolk, and his wife Elizabeth, and the elder brother of Brampton Gurdon (c. 1672 – 20 November 1741). As a member of Caius College, Cambridge, he received the degree of M.A. comitiis regiis in 1682, and in the reign of Queen Anne was appointed receiver-general of Norfolk. He resided mostly at Norwich, where in 1728 he published anonymously a valuable Essay on the Antiquity of the Castel of Norwich, its Founders and Governors from the Kings of the East Angles down to modern Times (octavo). Another work of great merit was his History of the High Court of Parliament, its Antiquity, Preheminence, and Authority; and the History of Court Baron and Court Leet, ... Together with the Rights of Lords of Manors in Common Pastures, and the Growth of the Privileges the Tenants Now Enjoy There (2 vols., octavo, 1731). Gurdon was elected a Fellow of the Society of Antiquaries of London in March 1718.

Gurdon died in November 1733 aged 70, and was buried in the church of Cranworth with Letton, Norfolk. By his wife Elizabeth, one of the daughters and coheirs of Sir William Cooke, Baronet of Brome, Suffolk, he had two sons, Brampton, who died before him, and Thornhagh; and three daughters, Jane, Elizabeth, and Letitia. Mrs. Gurdon survived until 1745.
