= Adam de Gurdon =

English knight (died 1305)

Sir Adam de Gurdon (died 1305) was an English knight who rebelled against King Henry III and fought in single combat against the Prince Edward, the king's son and the future King Edward I. They were reconciled and he served Edward faithfully from then on. It is said that the story of Robin Hood (Rob in hood) is based on Sir Adam de Gurdon's life.

== Biography ==
Adam Gurdon was the son of Adam de Gurdon, one of the bailiffs of Alton, Hampshire. He sided with Simon de Montfort, 6th Earl of Leicester in the Second Barons' War; and on 28 July 1265 repulsed the Welsh who were plundering in Somerset, at Dunster. He was one of the disinherited in 1266, and with others of his party formed a band which ravaged Berkshire, Buckinghamshire, and Hampshire. Prince Edward marched against them in person, and meeting them in the vicinity of Alton Wood (or perhaps at Halton, Buckinghamshire) defeated Gurdon in single combat. Sir Adam's prowess won the admiration of his conqueror, who restored him to his estates and made him one of his most trusted supporters.

Sir Adam was a justice of the forest in 1280, and in 1293 mention is made of forest offences which had been tried before him. He took part both in the Welsh and Scottish wars, and in 1295 was custos of the sea shores of Hampshire, and a commissioner of array in that county, and in Dorset and in Wiltshire. He died in 1305.

== Family ==
Sir Adam married:

1. Constance, daughter and heiress of John de Vanuz, whose estates were at Selborne;
2. Almeria, by whom he had two sons;
3. Agnes, whose daughter Johanna was his heiress.

From his second son, Robert, the Gurdons of Assington and Letton are descended. His estate of Gurdon Manor is now the property of Magdalen College, Oxford.
