= 100 Federal Street =

Office skyscraper in Boston, Massachusetts

100 Federal Street First National Bank Building
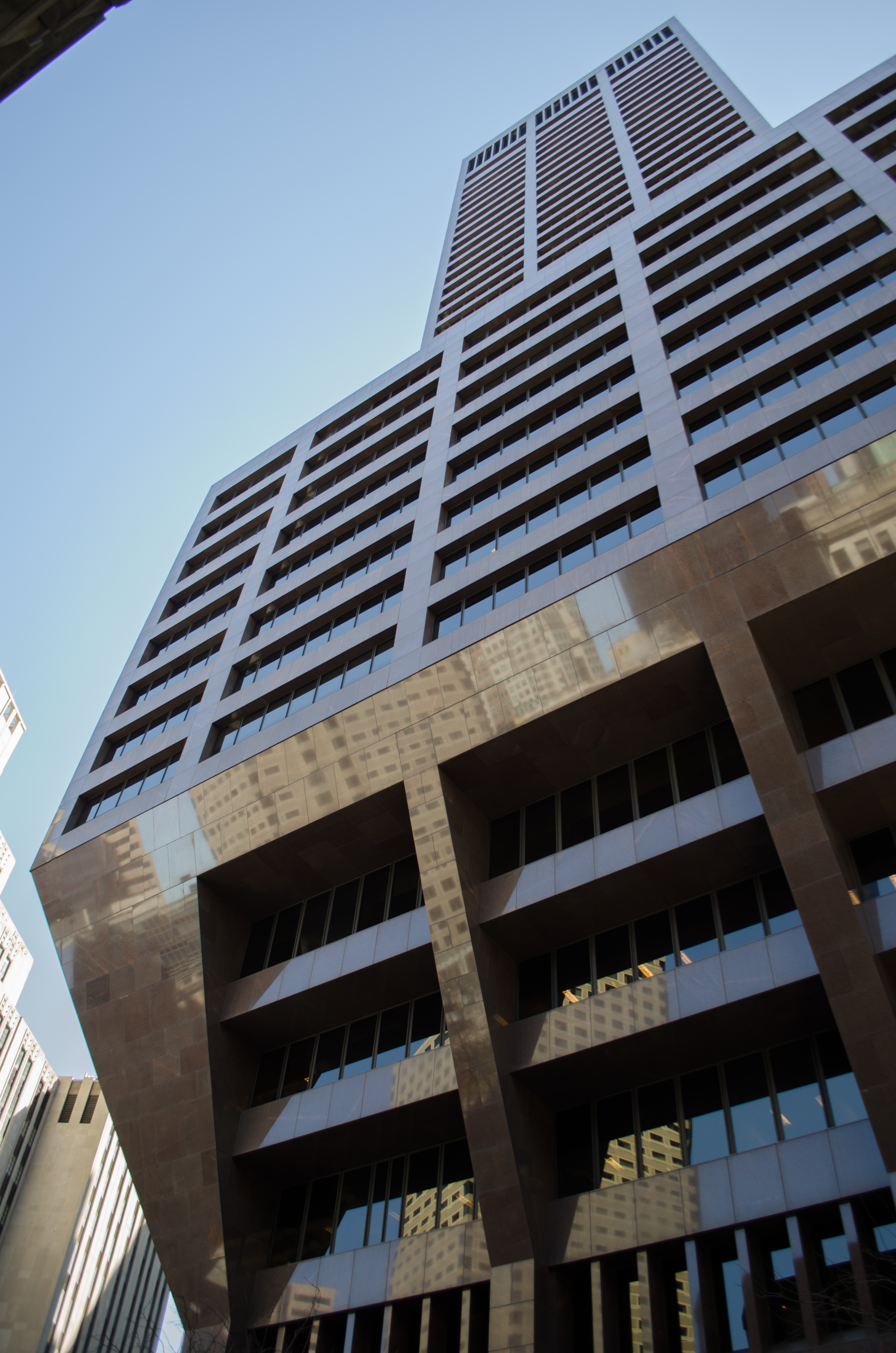
- Interactive map of the 100 Federal Street; First National Bank Building area

General information
- Type: Office
- Location: 100 Federal Street; Boston, Massachusetts, United States
- Coordinates: 42°21′18″N 71°03′22″W
- Construction started: 1968
- Completed: 1971

Height
- Roof: 591 ft (180 m)

Technical details
- Floor count: 37
- Floor area: 1,174,988 sq ft (109,160.0 m^{2})

Design and construction
- Architect: Campbell, Aldrich & Nulty
- Developer: UBS PaineWebber, Inc.

Website
- https://www.100federaloffice.com/

100 Federal Street, formerly known as the First National Bank Building and nicknamed the Pregnant Building, is a skyscraper located in the Financial District of Boston, Massachusetts. The skyscraper, rising 591 feet (180 m) and 37 floors, is Boston's 11th-tallest building. The building was completed in 1971, and formerly served as the world headquarters of Bank of Boston/BankBoston. When Fleet Financial Group of Providence, Rhode Island merged with BankBoston to form FleetBoston Financial, it became the merged company's headquarters until Bank of America acquired it in 2004. The building is now the center of Bank of America's New England operations.

The building was purchased by Boston Properties, Inc. in March 2012 for $615 million (USD). As part of the sale, Bank of America will continue to occupy office space in the building with a long-term lease. The name of the building was also officially changed to its street address, 100 Federal Street.

== Design ==
The design of the First National Bank Building is unusual, as it has a bulge of several stories near its base. These protruding floors are the origin of the building's nickname, the "Pregnant Building." The architect of the skyscraper, Campbell, Aldrich & Nulty, designed the building alongside LeMessurier with the bulge in order to give pedestrians a wider view of the street but at the same time provide the building with more floor space at higher levels. The skyscraper is considered to have an Art Moderne style.

== Tenants ==
- Bank of America
- Empower
- Putnam Investments
- Thomas H. Lee Partners
- Crescent Capital
- Best Doctors

== See also ==
- List of tallest buildings in Boston
