= Brampton Gurdon (lecturer) =

English clergyman and academic

Brampton Gurdon (c. 1672 in Letton, Norfolk – 20 November 1741) was an English clergyman and academic, Boyle lecturer in 1721.

== Life ==
Gurdon was the younger son of Brampton Gurdon, of Letton, Norfolk (who was nephew of John Gurdon), by his wife Elizabeth, daughter of Francis Thornhagh, of Fenton, Nottinghamshire. His older brother was Thornhagh Gurdon (1663 – November 1733), the English antiquarian. Gurdon was admitted at the age of 15 to Caius College, Cambridge, in 1687, and graduated B.A. in 1691 and M.A. in 1695. By 1696 he had been elected fellow of his college. His Boyle lectures were published as The Pretended Difficulties in Natural or Reveal'd Religion no Excuse for Infidelity. Sixteen Sermons preach'd in the Church of St. Mary le Bow, London, in ... 1721 and 1722, 8vo, London, 1723. Gurdon was a favourite of Lord Chancellor Macclesfield, who made him his chaplain and gave him the rectory of Stapleford Abbotts, Essex, 17 March 1719 – 1720, a living he resigned 3 November 1724. On 16 March 1726–7 he was collated to the archdeaconry of Sudbury; became rector of Denham, Buckinghamshire, 17 October 1730; and rector of St. Edmund the King, Lombard Street, about 1732, preferments which he held until his death.

He died unmarried in the parish of St. Giles-in-the-Fields, 20 November 1741.

== Works ==
His other writings are:

- Probabile est animam non semper cogitare. Idea Dei non est innata [in verse.], s.sh.fol. [Cambridge], 1696.
- The Distinction of Christians into Clergy and Laity justified: in a sermon [on Ephes. iv. 11, 12] preached . . . at the consecration of ... John [Leng] . . . bishop of Norwich, 4to, London, 1723.
- Christian Religion supported by the Prophecies of the Old Testament: or, a Defence of the Argument drawn from Prophecy, 8vo, London, 1728.
- A Letter to a Lady: where-in the canonical authority of St. Matthew's Gospel is defended [anon.], 8vo, London, 1732.
- An Answer to the Defence of the Dissertation or Enquiry concerning the Gospel according to St. Matthew ... By the Author of the Letter to a Lady, 8vo, London, 1733.
