= Suffolk Trained Bands =

Auxiliary force of the British Army

- Active: 1558–1662
- Country: Kingdom of England
- Branch: Trained Bands
- Role: Infantry and Cavalry
- Size: 4 Regiments of Foot, 1 Regiment of Horse
- Engagements: First Bishops' War; Second Bishops' War; Siege of Colchester; Battle of Worcester

Commanders
- Notable commanders: Col Sir Thomas Barnardiston, 1st Baronet; Col Brampton Gurdon of Letton; Major John Moody

The Suffolk Trained Bands were a part-time auxiliary military force in the county of Suffolk on the East Coast of England from 1558 until they were reconstituted as the Suffolk Militia in 1662. They were periodically embodied for home defence, for example in the army mustered at Tilbury during the Armada Campaign of 1588. They served in the Bishops' Wars and the Second and Third English Civil Wars, including the Siege of Colchester and the Battle of Worcester. They were also reorganised to support the Commonwealth and Protectorate regimes during the 1650s.

== Origin ==
The English militia was descended from the Anglo-Saxon Fyrd, the military force raised from the freemen of the shires under command of their Sheriff. It continued under the Norman kings, and was reorganised under the Assizes of Arms of 1181 and 1252, and again by King Edward I's Statute of Winchester of 1285.

The legal basis of the militia was updated by two acts of 1557 covering musters (4 & 5 Ph. & M. c. 3) and the maintenance of horses and armour (4 & 5 Ph. & M. c. 2) under the lord lieutenant, assisted by the deputy lieutenants and justices of the peace (JPs). The entry into force of these acts in 1558 is seen as the starting date for the formal county militia in England.

Suffolk was one of the southern counties called upon to send troops to suppress the Rising of the North in 1569. Although the militia obligation was universal, this assembly confirmed that it was clearly impractical to train and equip every able-bodied man. After 1572 the practice was to select a proportion of men for the Trained Bands (TBs), who were mustered for regular training, while the others might be employed as pioneers. The following year Suffolk reported a total of 19,000 males between the ages of 16 and 60, of whom 9000 were classed as 'able men'; of these, 2600 were selected for training, 1500 others were carpenters, smiths and labourers, and there were just over 100 cavalry. From 1583 the maritime counties such as Suffolk were given precedence for training: in return for a reduced quota they were supplied with professional captains to muster and train them. In 1584 the county had 2000 trained men, of which 800 were equipped with firearms, 600 with bows, and 600 were 'corslets' (armoured pikemen).

== Spanish War ==
The Armada Crisis in 1588 led to the mustering of the TBs in April. They were put on one hour's notice in June and called out on 23 July as the Armada approached. Suffolk was ordered to assign 2000 men to defend the county's ports and landing places and to send 2500 into Essex to join the Queen's army at Tilbury. Those actually mobilised in Suffolk numbered 3892 out of 4239 able men (of whom 2000 were nominally trained). In addition the county furnished 80 lancers, 230 light horse, and 84 'petronels' (the petronel was an early cavalry firearm).

In the 16th Century little distinction was made between the militia and the troops levied by the counties for overseas expeditions. Between 1589 and 1601 Suffolk supplied over 2250 levies for service in Ireland, France or the Netherlands. However, the counties usually conscripted the unemployed and criminals rather than the Trained Bandsmen – in 1585 the Privy Council had ordered the impressment of able-bodied unemployed men, and the Queen ordered 'none of her trayned-bands to be pressed'. Replacing the weapons issued to the levies from the militia armouries was a heavy cost on the counties. A detachment of the Suffolk TBs is believed to have acted as marines aboard the Ipswich ships Corslet and James, which took part in Lord Howard of Effingham's Capture of Cádiz in 1596.

With the passing of the threat of invasion, the TBs declined in the early 17th Century. Later, King Charles I attempted to reform them into a national force or 'Perfect Militia' answering to the king rather than local control. Renewed Anglo-French tensions in the 1620s led to England's coastal defences being repaired. Rather than have a divided command responsible for the Orwell estuary, the lords-lieutenant of Essex and Suffolk agreed that Essex would be responsible for the new fort at Landguard on the Suffolk shore (Note: Leading to its confusing description in some official documents as being 'Landguard in Essex'.) as well as the new bulwarks at Harwich in Essex. In turn, Suffolk Trained Band horse and foot would always be in readiness to reinforce the peacetime garrison of Landguard. The situation became so tense in 1625 that the Suffolk TBs were placed on one hour's notice for duty at the yet-uncompleted fort.

== Bishops' Wars ==
=== First Bishops' War ===
In 1638 the Suffolk Trained Bands mustered 4148 men, armed with 2359 muskets and 1789 'corslets' (pikemen with armour), organised as four regiments of foot, together with a mounted force of 300 cuirassiers. The TBs were called upon to send contingents for the Bishops' Wars, in 1639 and 1640, though many of the men who actually went were untrained substitutes. In the First Bishops' War Suffolk (along with Essex and Kent) supplied both a contingent of pressed men and homogeneous TB companies (1200 men) for Colonel Sir Nicholas Byron's Regiment of Foot and for Sir Simon Harcourt's Regiment of Foot, which was drawn from the Cambridgeshire, Essex and Suffolk TBs. But Suffolk was unusually obedient in providing good men and weapons: the King's commander, the Marquis of Hamilton, complained that the Cambridge, Essex and Kent men were almost entirely untrained and improperly armed. The officers of both regiments were inexperienced, and Hamilton had too few trained TB men to provide enough non-commissioned officers (NCOs).

In April 1639 Harcourt's regiment was one of those shipped to the Firth of Forth and landed on the island of Inchcolm. However, the Covenanters onshore were too strong for Hamilton to attempt a landing. In May the regiments were re-embarked and sailed back to anchor off Dunbar, later continuing to Holy Island, where they arrived on 28 May. They marched to Berwick-upon-Tweed and in June were present at the final stand-off between the armies between Birks and Duns Law on the border. After that the army was dispersed to its homes.

=== Second Bishops' War ===
In the Second Bishops' War Suffolk was ordered to assemble 600 men for service against the Scots on 27 May 1640 and march then to Yarmouth on 6 June, ready to embark there on 8 June for Newcastle upon Tyne. This time the Suffolk men were unwilling, and mutinied, detaining their officers.

== Civil Wars ==
=== First English Civil War ===
Control of the trained bands was one of the major points of dispute between Charles I and Parliament that led to the First English Civil War. When open warfare broke out between the King and Parliament, neither side made much use of the trained bands beyond securing the county armouries for their own full-time troops who would serve anywhere in the country, many of whom were former trained bandsmen. Suffolk was in Parliamentary territory far from the battlefronts, and Landguard Fort was held for Parliament throughout the war.

=== Second English Civil War ===
However, when the Second English Civil War broke out in 1648, East Anglia. was at the heart of the fighting. By now the Suffolk TBs were organised as follows:

- Col Sir Thomas Barnardiston's Foot
- Col James Harvey's Foot (raised from the Ipswich division)
- Col John Fothergill's Foot (raised from the Bury St Edmunds division)
- Col William Blois's (or Bloyse's) Foot
- Col Brampton Gurdon's Horse (7 Troops)
- Capt Thomas Johnson's Aldeburgh Company
- Two Ipswich Companies

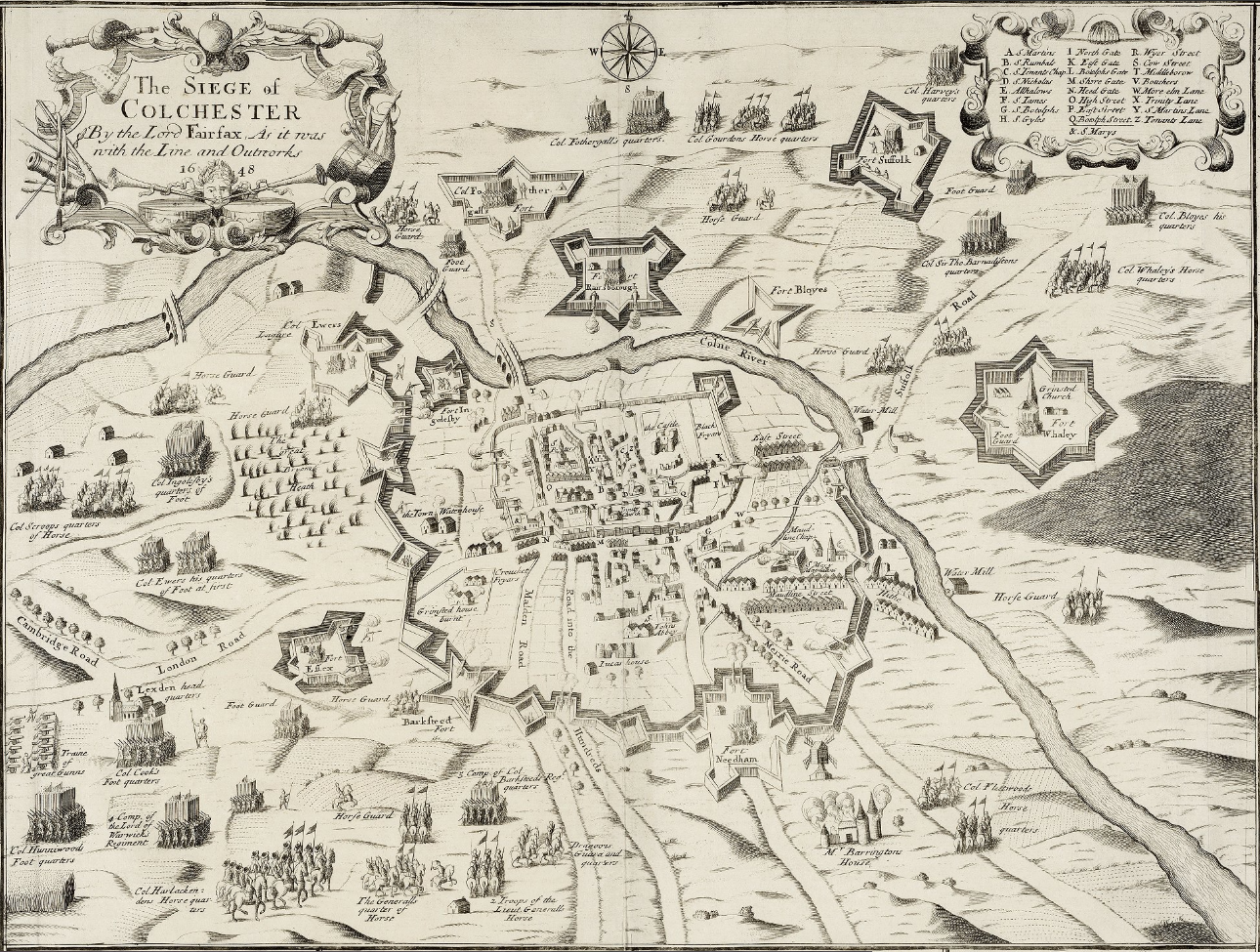
Map of the Siege of Colchester, 1648: 'Col Fothergill's Fort', 'Col Fothergill's quarters' and 'Col Gourdon's Horse quarters' are indicated in the north, 'Col Harvey's quarters' beyond Fort Suffolk, 'Col Sir Thos Barnardiston's quarters' and 'Col Bloyse his quarters' in the north-east, with 'Fort Bloyse' close to the River Colne, across from the town's north-east bastion.

Barnardiston's Regiment was called out briefly in May to put down a riot in Bury St Edmunds. A month later the whole county force was called out to oppose the Royalist army that had invaded Essex. Despite initial reluctance to cross the county border, the Suffolk regiments (including Ipswich's companies) joined Sir Thomas Fairfax's army on 24 June and participated in the Siege of Colchester. According to a map of the siege published in a contemporary broadsheet (see picture) the Suffolk TBs were camped across the River Colne covering the northern approaches to the town, while the regulars of the New Model Army conducted the siege works to the south. The TBs were stood down after the Royalists surrendered the town at the end of August.

Once Parliament had re-established full control it passed new Militia Acts in 1648 and 1650 that replaced lords lieutenant with county commissioners appointed by Parliament or the Council of State. At the same time the term 'Trained Band' began to disappear. Under the Commonwealth and Protectorate the militia received pay when called out, and operated alongside the New Model Army to control the country. The four Suffolk Foot Regiments were reduced to three, with Fothergill's the first to be recommissioned on 12 June 1650, followed by Harvey's on 6 July. Also in July four commissions for coast defence companies were issued, including Capt John Base's at Ipswich (the Ipswich TBs having been disbanded and the town's weapons sold off). Later these became a full regiment of five companies under Col Humphrey Brewster, assigned to the Beccles division, with another company added from Harvey's regiment in November. Barnardiston and Blois were not recommissioned, though Barnardiston continued to serve as a militia commissioner. The Suffolk Militia were embodied again during the insurrection in neighbouring Norfolk in November 1650, and three troops of dragoons were added to Gurdon's seven horse troops.

=== Third English Civil War ===
During the Third English Civil War, Major-General Thomas Harrison was sent to North West England in April 1651 with a temporary brigade of horse and dragoons recruited for six months' service from volunteers from the militia. Colonel Humphrey Brewster of the Suffolk Foot Militia, Major John Moody and Captains Robert Sparrow and Richard Moyse of Gurdon's Suffolk Horse Militia all served as troop commanders in this composite force. Brewster and Moody's Troops served with Col Nathaniel Rich's Horse in the Midlands, while Sparrow and Moyse's marched with Harrison. When the Scots Invaded England in July 1651, a composite regiment under Maj Blake consisting of five regular garrison companies and five militia companies from the Eastern Counties was ordered north to join Harrison's force, with five other militia companies called out to replace the garrisons. However, the situation was changing rapidly as the Scots continued to march south. A general call-out of the English Militia was ordered on 12 August. Those from the Eastern Counties were sent to a rendezvous at St Albans on 26 August under Lieutenant-General Charles Fleetwood (to which Blake's composite regiment was also diverted). Fothergill's and Harvey's regiments of foot and Gurdon's regiment of horse militia marched, leaving Brewster's in the county for local defence, with one troop of horse sent to Lothingland and reinforcements made available for Landguard Fort in case of intervention by the Dutch. As the crisis deepened the St Albans rendezvous was changed to Dunstable on 25 August, the militia to track the advance of the Scottish army as it moved south. Then on 23 August the Eastern Counties Militia were sent straight to Buckingham and finally on 24 August to Oxford where they rendezvoused with the militia from South East England. Some of the militia regiments (including the Suffolks) were then sent from this concentration and were involved in the Battle of Worcester, as were the two Troops with Harrison's force and possibly the two with Rich.

=== Protectorate Militia ===
After Worcester the militia were neglected, but they were embodied in March 1655 in response to the Penruddock uprising in the West Country. A scheme to call out a 1000-strong regiment in Suffolk to counter a possible invasion in the First Dutch War came to nothing. Fothergill's Foot may have been regularly mustered and exercised as late as 1659. In that year Col Brewster recommended that Ipswich should re-establish its two companies, and this was done in time for the Restoration.

However, the Protectorate government did experiment with 'Select Militia' for internal security, more directly under its own control. These units (mainly troops of horse) were manned by volunteers from the general militia, paid for by subscriptions and by fines on Royalists, and were analogous to the later Yeomanry Cavalry. A volunteer units of foot had briefly existed in Suffolk in 1651, commanded by John Fothergill of the county militia. Two horse troops were formed in Suffolk in the crisis of March 1655, commanded by John Fothergill and Robert Sparrow, with a third under Humphrey Brewster added in the north-east part of the county in October 1655. The same officers commanded troops during the interregnum of 1659, together with a troop of volunteers from Eye under a Mr Barker, with a further 20 horse and dragoons raised in Ipswich.

== Restoration Militia ==
After the Restoration of the Monarchy, the English Militia was re-established by the Militia Act of 1661 under the control of the king's lords lieutenant, the men to be selected by ballot. This was popularly seen as the 'Constitutional Force' to counterbalance a 'Standing Army' tainted by association with the New Model Army that had supported Cromwell's military dictatorship, and almost the whole burden of home defence and internal security was entrusted to the militia.
