= Brampton Gurdon of Letton =

English politician

Brampton Gurdon
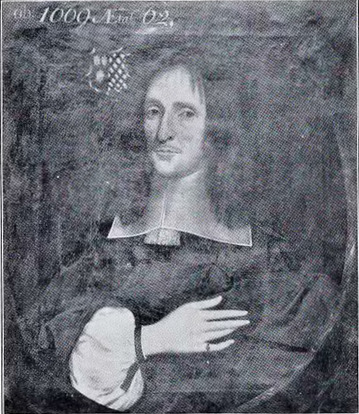

Member of the English Parliament for Sudbury
- In office Long Parliament

Personal details
- Born: 1606
- Died: 3 November 1669 (aged 62–63)
- Spouse: Mary Polstead
- Parent: Brampton Gurdon (father)
- Occupation: barrister

Military service
- Rank: colonel
- Battles/wars: English Civil War

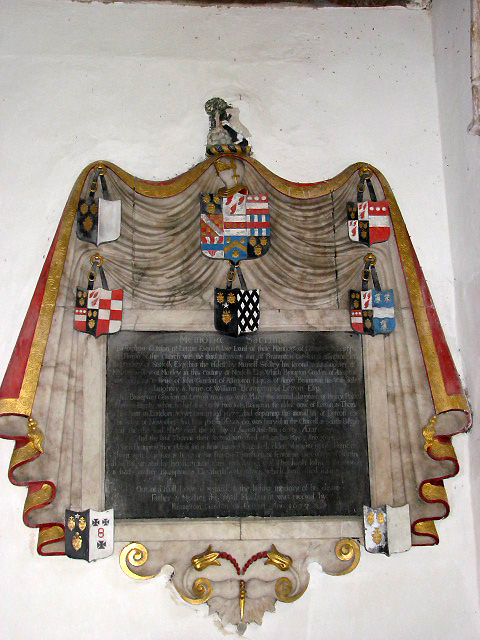
St Mary's church, Cranworth – wall monument Memorial to Brampton Gurdon

Brampton Gurdon (1606 – 3 November 1669), of Letton in Norfolk, was an English Member of Parliament (MP), lawyer and a colonel of cavalry during the English Civil War.

Gurdon was the son of Brampton Gurdon (died c. 1650), an MP and High Sheriff of Suffolk, by his second marriage. His father left him the Letton estate while passing the family's other estate (at Assington in Suffolk) to Brampton's older half-brother, John. Brampton qualified as a barrister, and in 1645 was elected a member of the Long Parliament, filling a vacancy at Sudbury, though he does not seem to have been an active member. During the Civil War he was Colonel of a regiment of Suffolk Trained Band Horse and served as a member of the court martial which condemned Sir Charles Lucas and Sir George Lisle to death after the Siege of Colchester. In 1651 and 1659 he commanded a Troop of Norfolk Trained Band Horse.

He married Mary Polstead, and died 3 November 1669. He was succeeded by his son, also called Brampton Gurdon (died 1691).

== Sources ==
- John Burke, A Genealogical and Heraldic History of the Commoners of Great Britain and Ireland (London: Henry Colburn, 1835)
- D Brunton & D H Pennington, Members of the Long Parliament (London: George Allen & Unwin, 1954)

Parliament of England
Preceded by [	Member of Parliament for Sudbury; 1645–1648; With: Simonds d'Ewes (until Pride's Purge)	Succeeded by
