= William Truman Aldrich =

American architect and painter

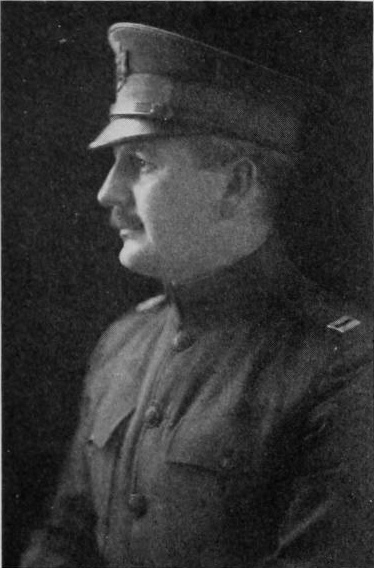
- Aldrich during WW1
- Born: February 16, 1880; Washington, D.C., United States
- Died: June 2, 1966 (aged 86); Brookline, Massachusetts, United States
- Occupations: Architect and painter

William Truman Aldrich FAIA (February 16, 1880 – June 2, 1966) was an American architect and painter. Though primarily a residential architect, he is also known for large museum buildings in Providence, Rhode Island, Worcester, Massachusetts and elsewhere.

== Life and career ==
William Truman Aldrich was born February 16, 1880, to Nelson W. Aldrich, United States Representative from Rhode Island from 1879 to 1881 and Senator from 1881 to 1911, and Abigail Pearce Truman Chapman.

He graduated from the Massachusetts Institute of Technology in 1901, and then studied in Paris at the École nationale supérieure des Beaux-Arts. In 1909 he started working for Carrère & Hastings. In 1912 Aldrich returned to Boston and formed a partnership with fellow architect Robert P. Bellows. Bellows and Aldrich worked together until 1924, when both architects established separate offices. He continued to work as a private practitioner for the remainder of his career.

Between 1945 and 1950 he was a member of the United States Commission of Fine Arts.

== Work as an architect ==
With Robert P. Bellows, Aldrich was responsible for a building for the School of Theology of Boston University (1916) and a large house in Providence, Rhode Island for lawyer Rush Sturges (1922), among other projects. This is now the President's House of Brown University.

After dissolving his partnership, Aldrich designed a number of prominent museum, academic and government buildings. These include the Eliza G. Radeke Building of the Rhode Island School of Design Museum (1926), the front building of the Worcester Art Museum in Worcester, Massachusetts (1931–33), the United States Post Office in Gloucester, Massachusetts (1932–35, with William Chester Chase) and Munger Hall (1933) and the original part of the Keohane Sports Center (1938) on the campus of Wellesley College. After World War II, Aldrich's most important work is the Memorial Chapel of the Brittany American Cemetery and Memorial in Normandy, France, completed in 1956.

Smaller projects include the Temple to Music in Roger Williams Park in Providence, Rhode Island (1924), a museum extension to the former building of the Lynn Historical Society in Lynn, Massachusetts (1929) and the Spee Club in Cambridge, Massachusetts (1931).

Aldrich was also responsible for a number of large private residences. In Providence, he designed houses for Frederick E. Bodell (1928), Frederick H. Perkins (1929–30) and Donald E. Jackson (1935). He also designed Assington (1929–30), the country estate of George Lewis in Sherborn, Massachusetts. The estate was listed on the National Register of Historic Places in 1986.

== Personal life ==
Aldrich married in 1910, to Dorothea Davenport of Boston. Their son, Nelson Wilmarth Aldrich, also became an architect. The younger Aldrich is best known for his work as a member of the firm of Campbell, Aldrich & Nulty of Boston. Aldrich died June 2, 1966, at home in Brookline, Massachusetts.

== Work as a painter ==
His painted work was part of the painting event in the art competition at the 1928 Summer Olympics. The Museum of Fine Arts, Boston owns eight of his paintings, while the Harvard Art Museums own a further nine works. The Rhode Island School of Design Museum hosted an exhibition of his water colours in 1927.

Aldrich worked with his sister, Abby Aldrich Rockefeller, in her efforts to establish the Museum of Modern Art.

== Gallery of architectural works ==
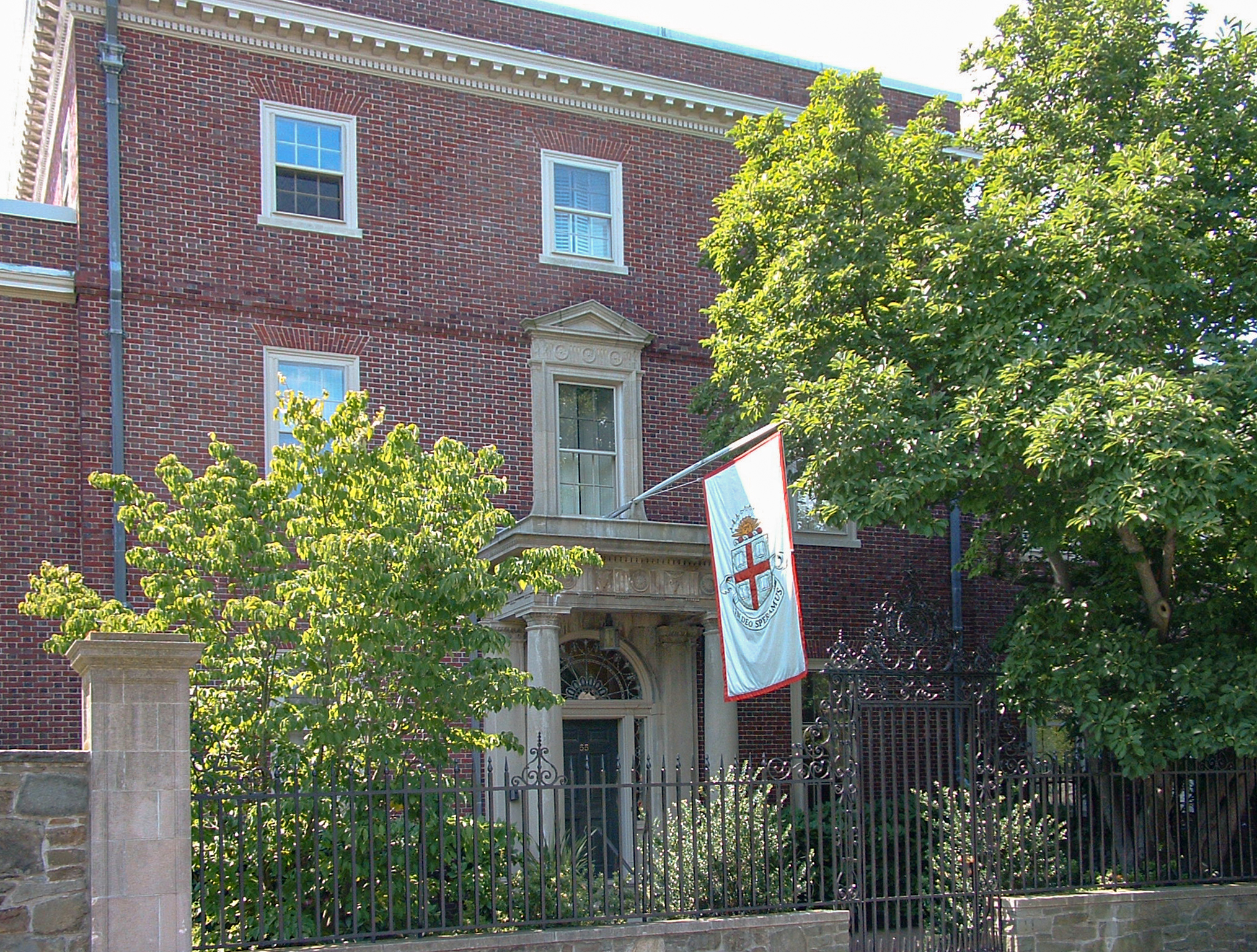
House for Rush Sturges, Providence, Rhode Island, 1922.

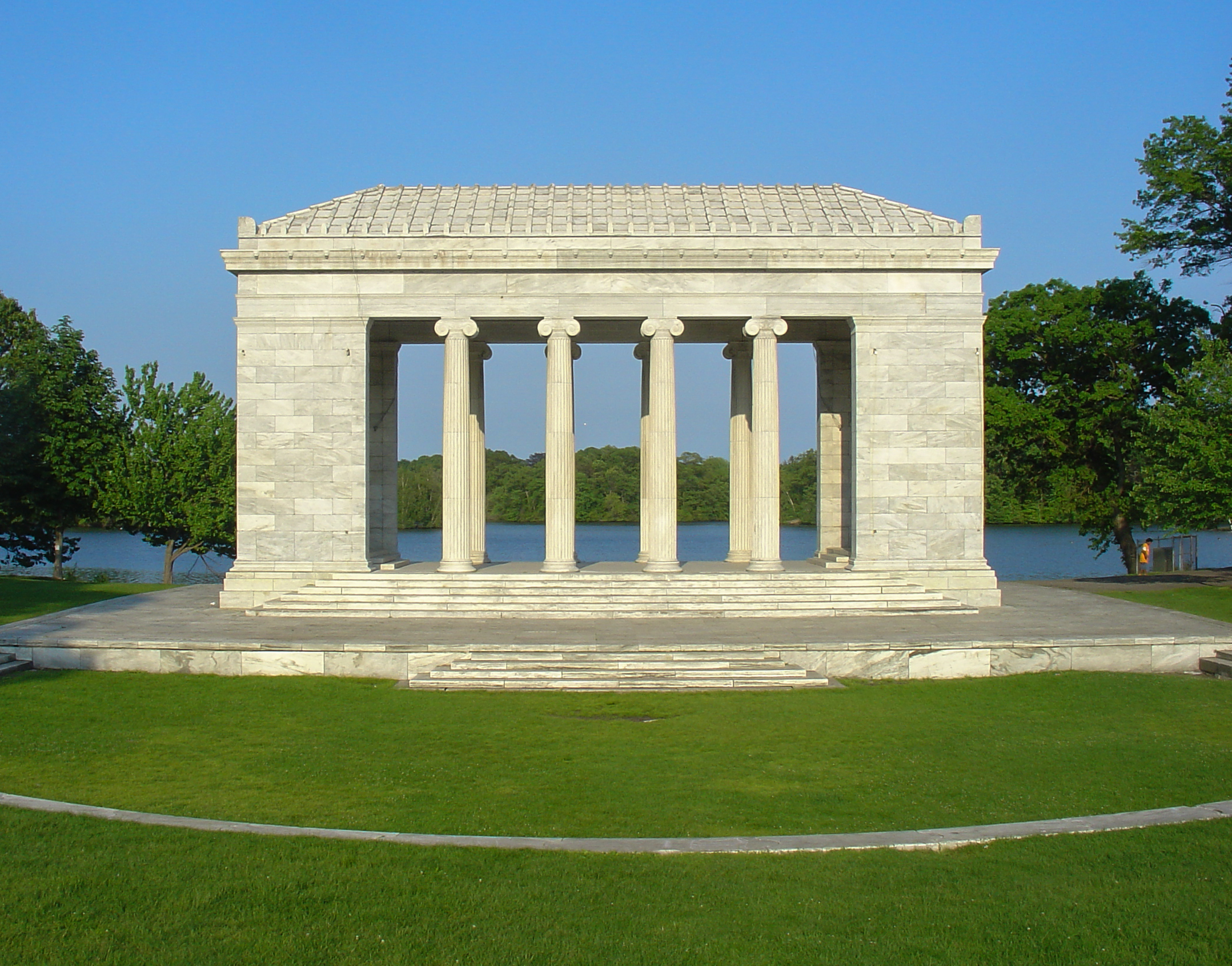
Temple to Music, Roger Williams Park, Providence, Rhode Island, 1924.

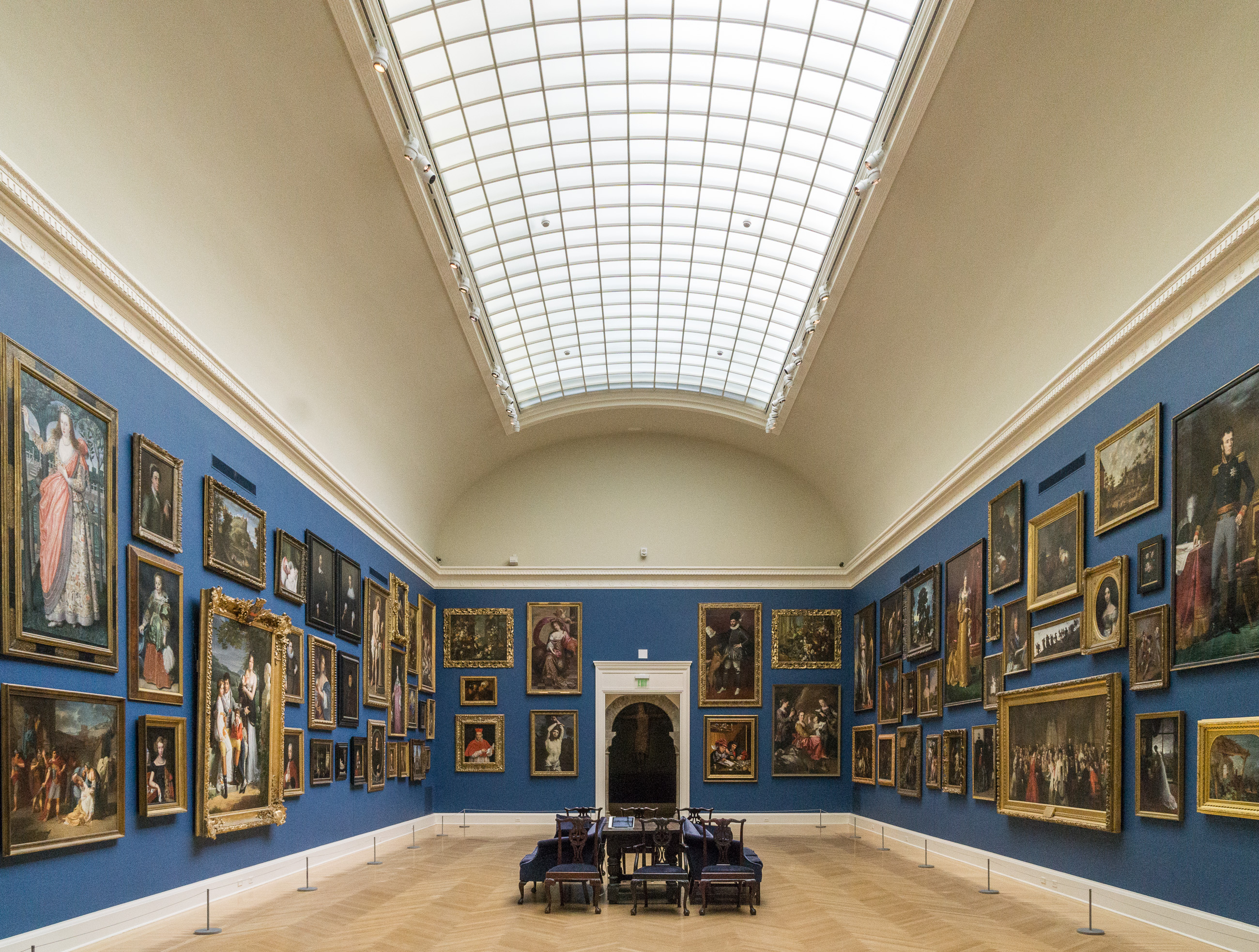
Interior of the Eliza G. Radeke Building, Rhode Island School of Design Museum, Providence, Rhode Island, 1926.

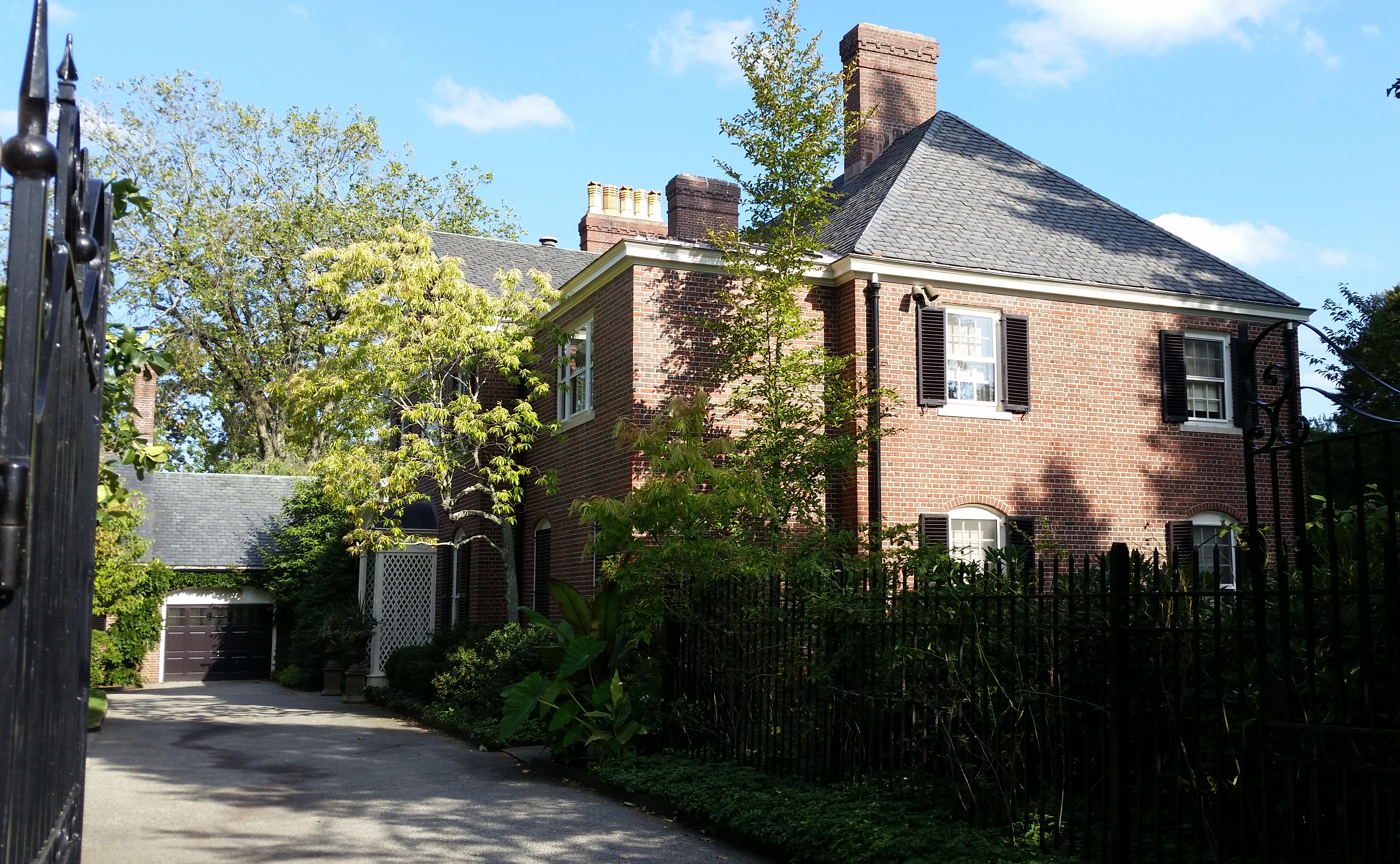
House for Frederick E. Bodell, Providence, Rhode Island, 1928.

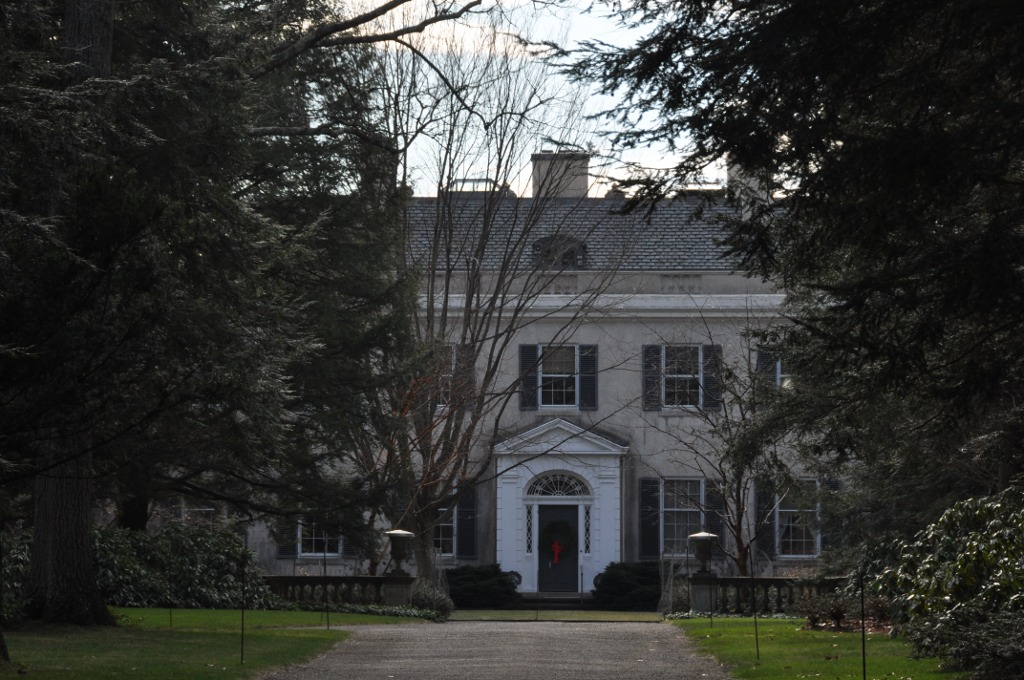
Assington, Sherborn, Massachusetts, 1929-30.

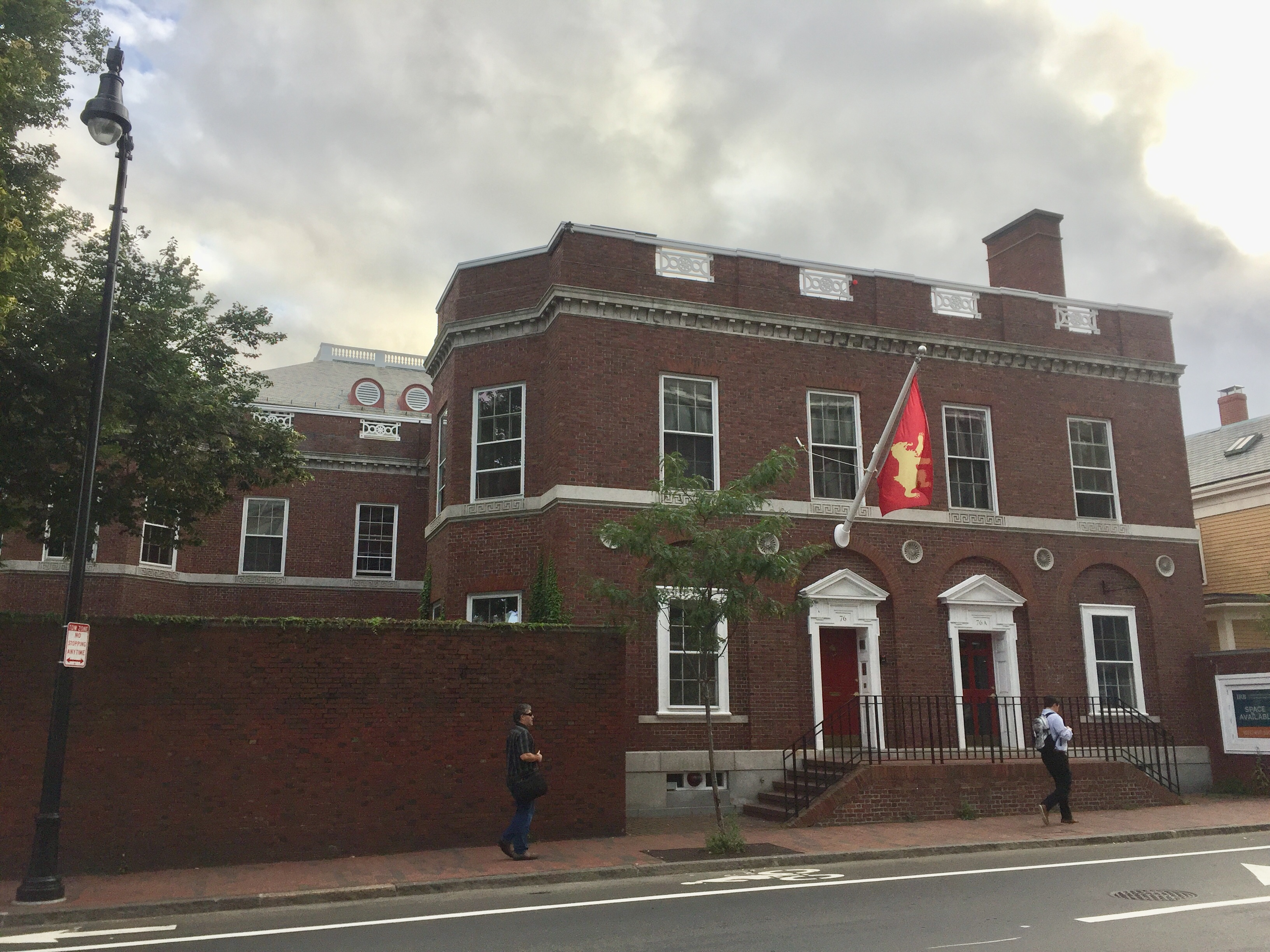
Spee Club, Cambridge, Massachusetts, 1931.

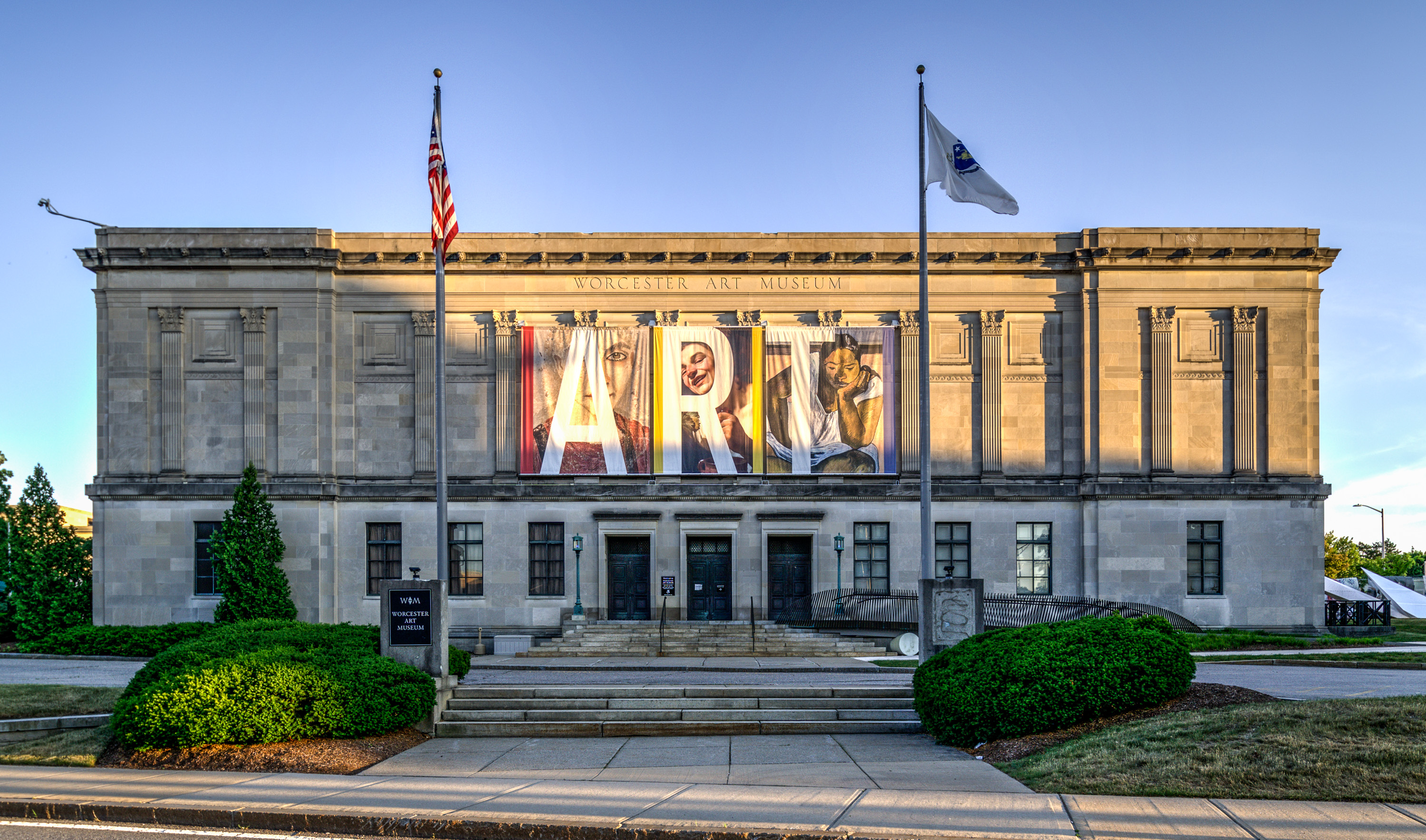
Worcester Art Museum, Worcester, Massachusetts, 1931-33.

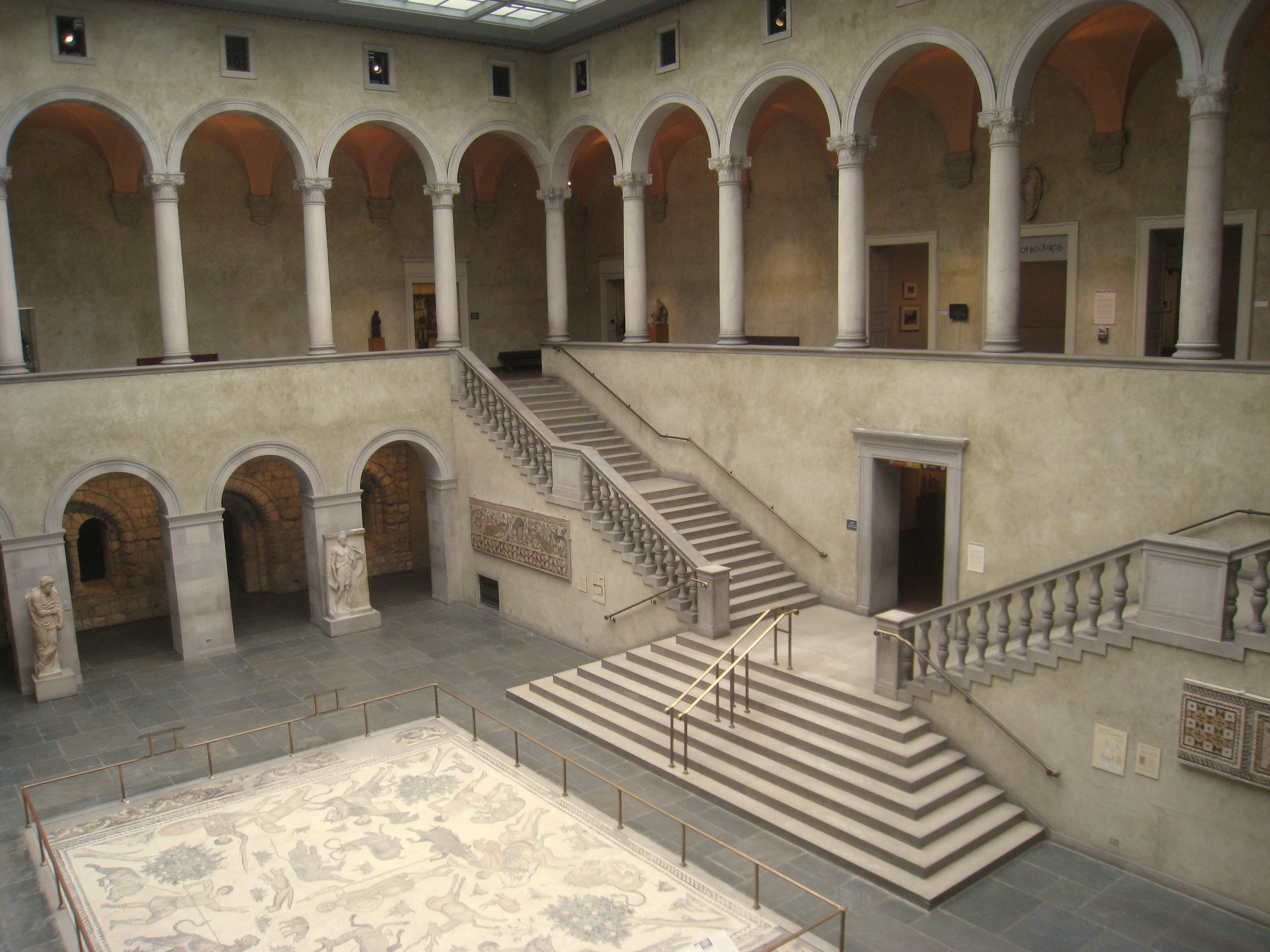
Interior of the Worcester Art Museum, Worcester, Massachusetts, 1931-33.

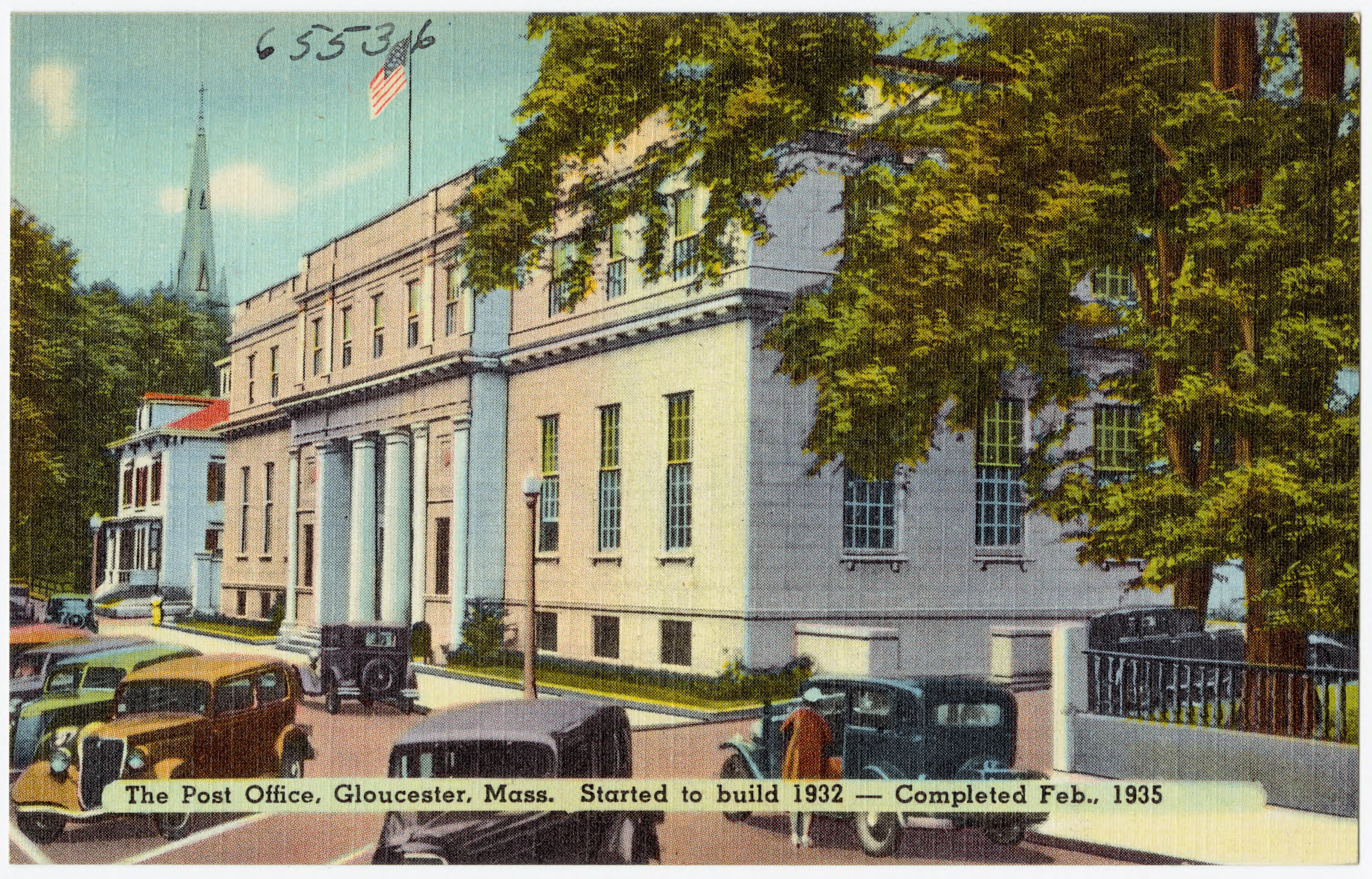
United States Post Office, Gloucester, Massachusetts, 1932-35.

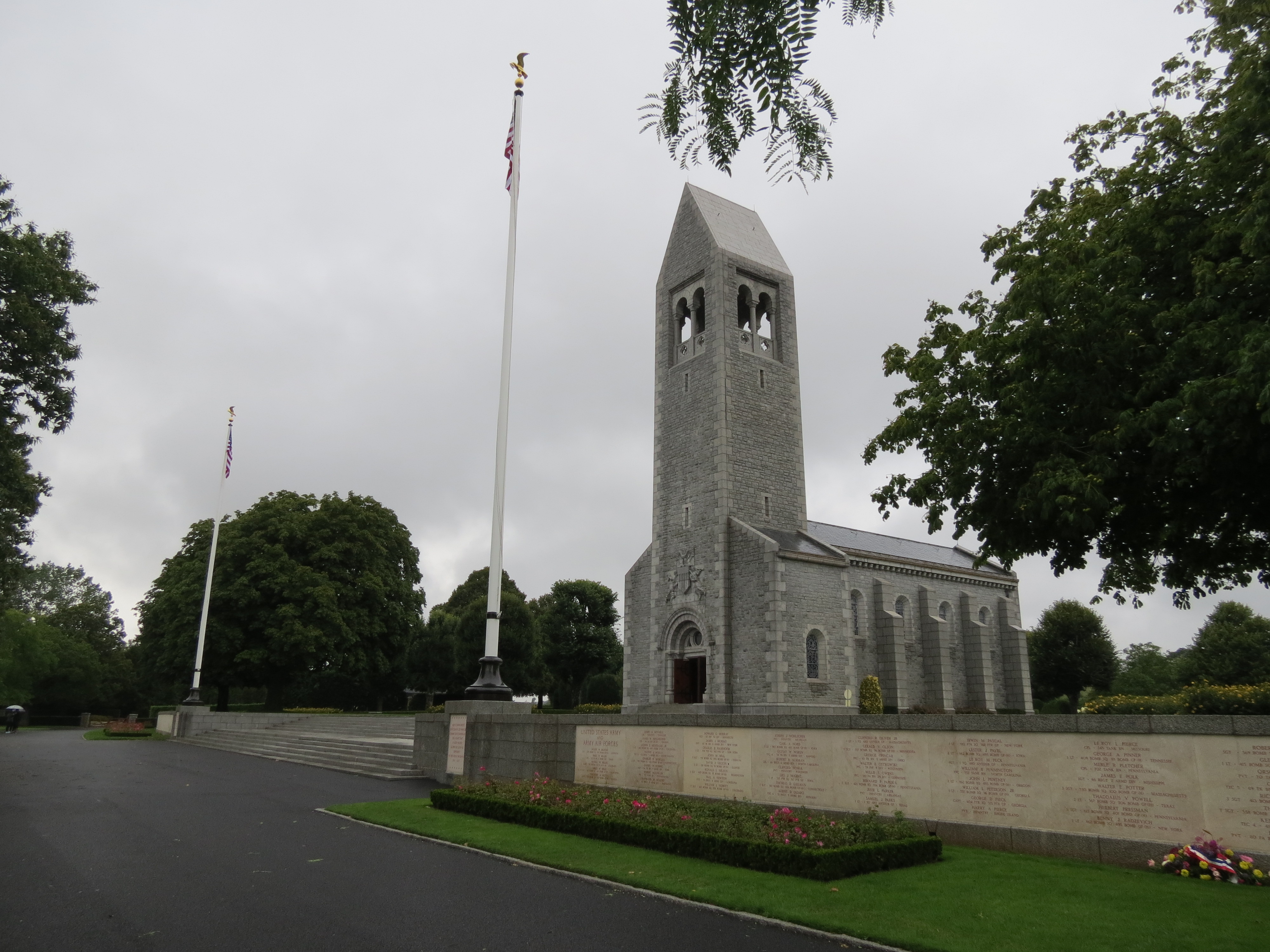
Memorial Chapel, Brittany American Cemetery and Memorial, Saint-James, Normandy, France, 1952-56.
