= Brampton Gurdon (of Assington and Letton) =

English politician

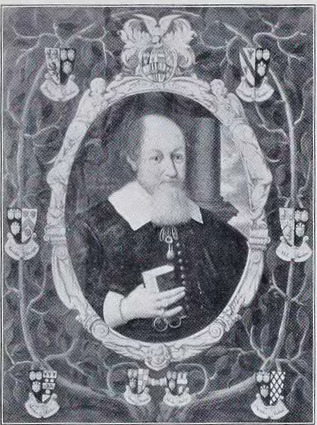

Member of the English Parliament for Sudbury
- In office 1621–1622

Sheriff of Suffolk
- In office 1628–1629

Personal details
- Born: July 1566
- Died: c. 1650
- Spouses: Elizabeth Barrett; Muriel Sedley
- Children: 15, including John and Brampton
- Parent: John Gurdon (father)

Brampton Gurdon (July 1566 – c. 1650) was an English country gentleman and politician who sat in the House of Commons from 1621 to 1622.

Gurdon was the son of John Gurdon of Assington, Suffolk and his wife Amy Brampton, daughter of William Brampton of Letton, Norfolk. His father was MP for Sudbury and High Sheriff of Suffolk in 1585.

In 1621, Gurdon was elected Member of Parliament for Sudbury. He became Sheriff of Suffolk in 1628.

Gurdon married twice. His first wife was Elizabeth Barrett, daughter of Edward Barrett of Bellhouse, Essex, and they had sons John and Robert and a daughter Amy who married Sir Henry Mildmay of Graces. He married secondly Muriel Sedley, daughter of Sir Martyn Sedley of Morley Norfolk and they had a son Brampton and daughters Muriel who married Richard Saltonshall of Yorkshire, and Abigail who married Roger Hill of Somerset. He divided his estates between his two sons: John, who was MP for several constituencies during the Civil War period and a member of the Council of State succeeded to Assington, and Letton passed to Brampton who was a cavalry colonel on the Parliamentary side during the Civil War and later also MP for Sudbury.

He was interred on 2 April 1650. There is a memorial to him in the church of St Edmund in Assington.

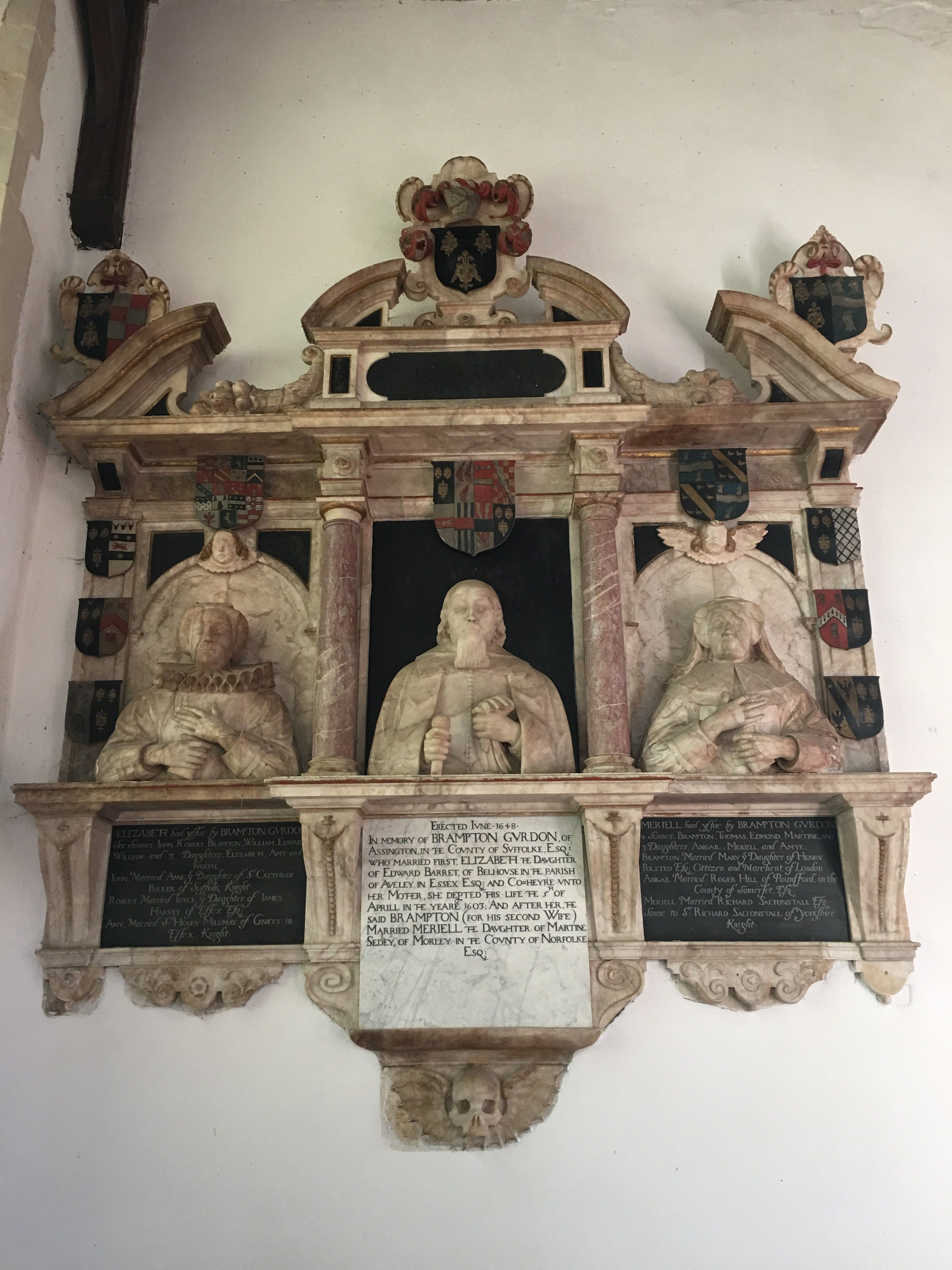
Memorial to Brampton Gurdon in the church of St Edmund in Assington, Suffolk

Parliament of England
Preceded by Robert Crane; Henry Binge	Member of Parliament for Sudbury; 1621–1622; With: Edward Osborne	Succeeded by Robert Crane; Sir William Pooley
