= Campbell, Aldrich & Nulty =

Modernist architectural firm in Boston

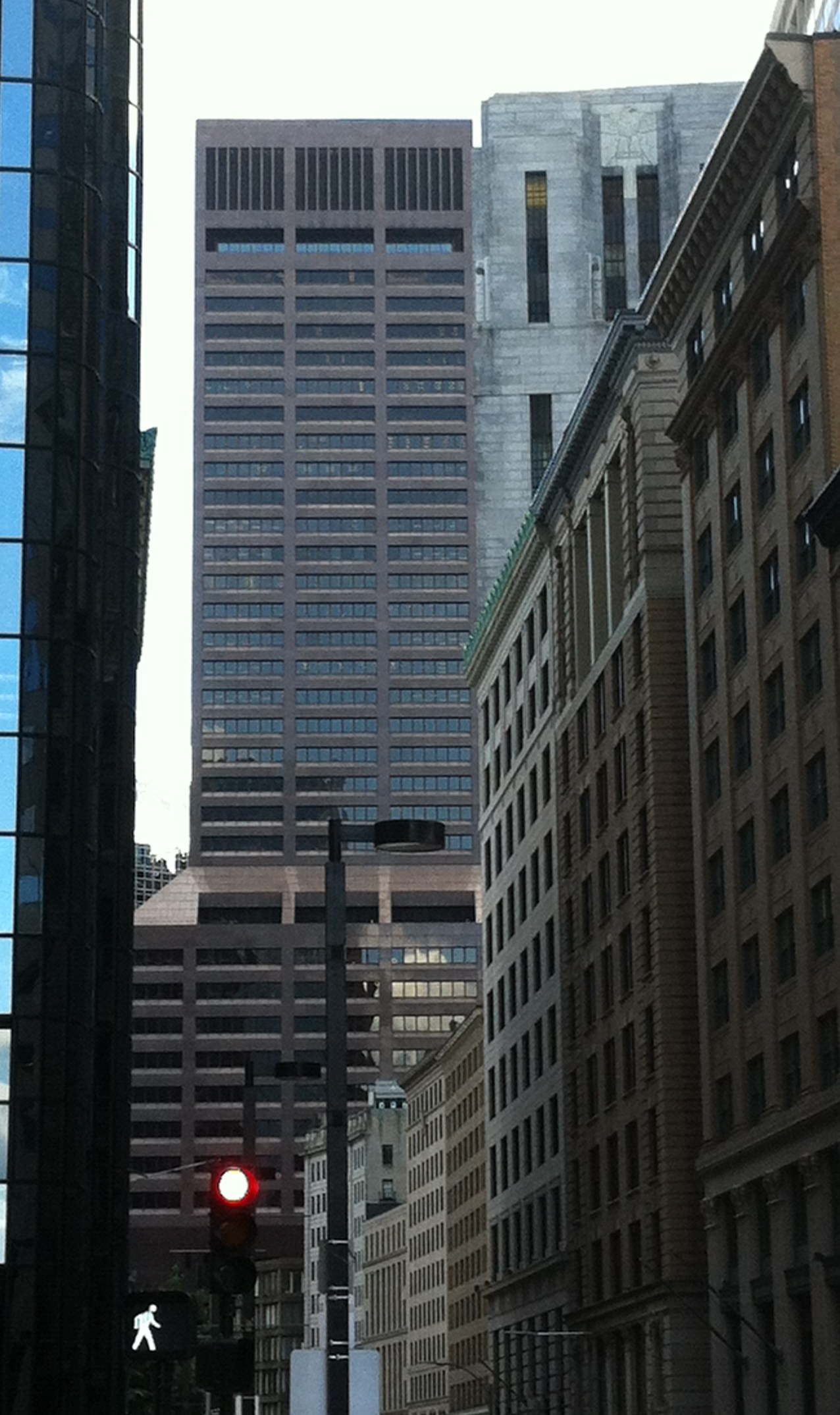
100 Federal Street in Boston, designed by the firm

Campbell, Aldrich & Nulty (CAN) was an architectural firm based in Boston, Massachusetts. The firm's principals were leading modernists, from the 1950s to the 1970s, when International Modernism matured in America. CAN was a successor of Campbell & Aldrich, founded in 1945. Its principals were Walter E. Campbell, Nelson Wilmarth Aldrich, and Lawrence Frederick Nulty. In the late 1960s and in the 1970s, the partnership of Aldrich and Nulty designed some of New England's most recognizable and controversial modernist architecture.

== Building designs ==
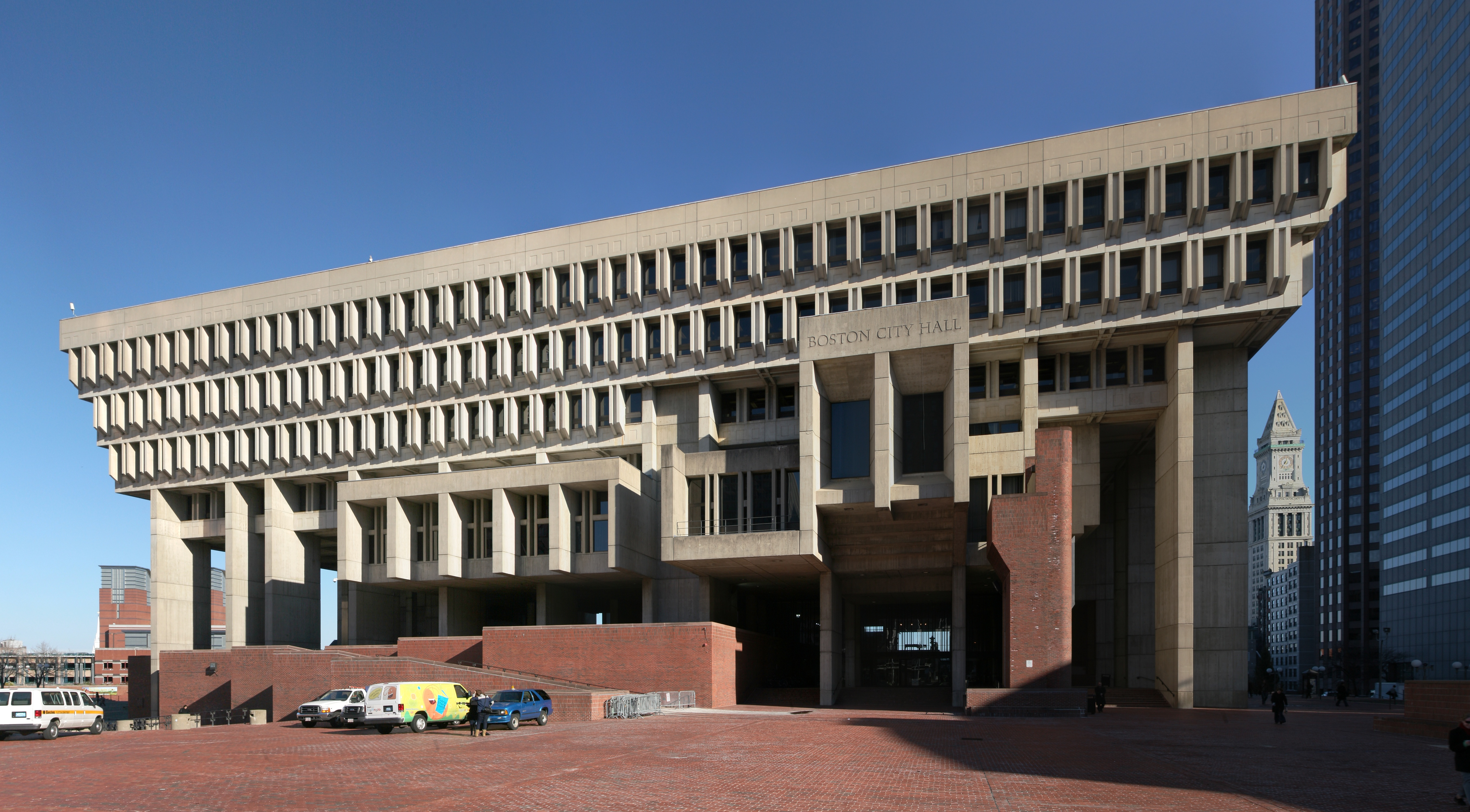
Boston City Hall

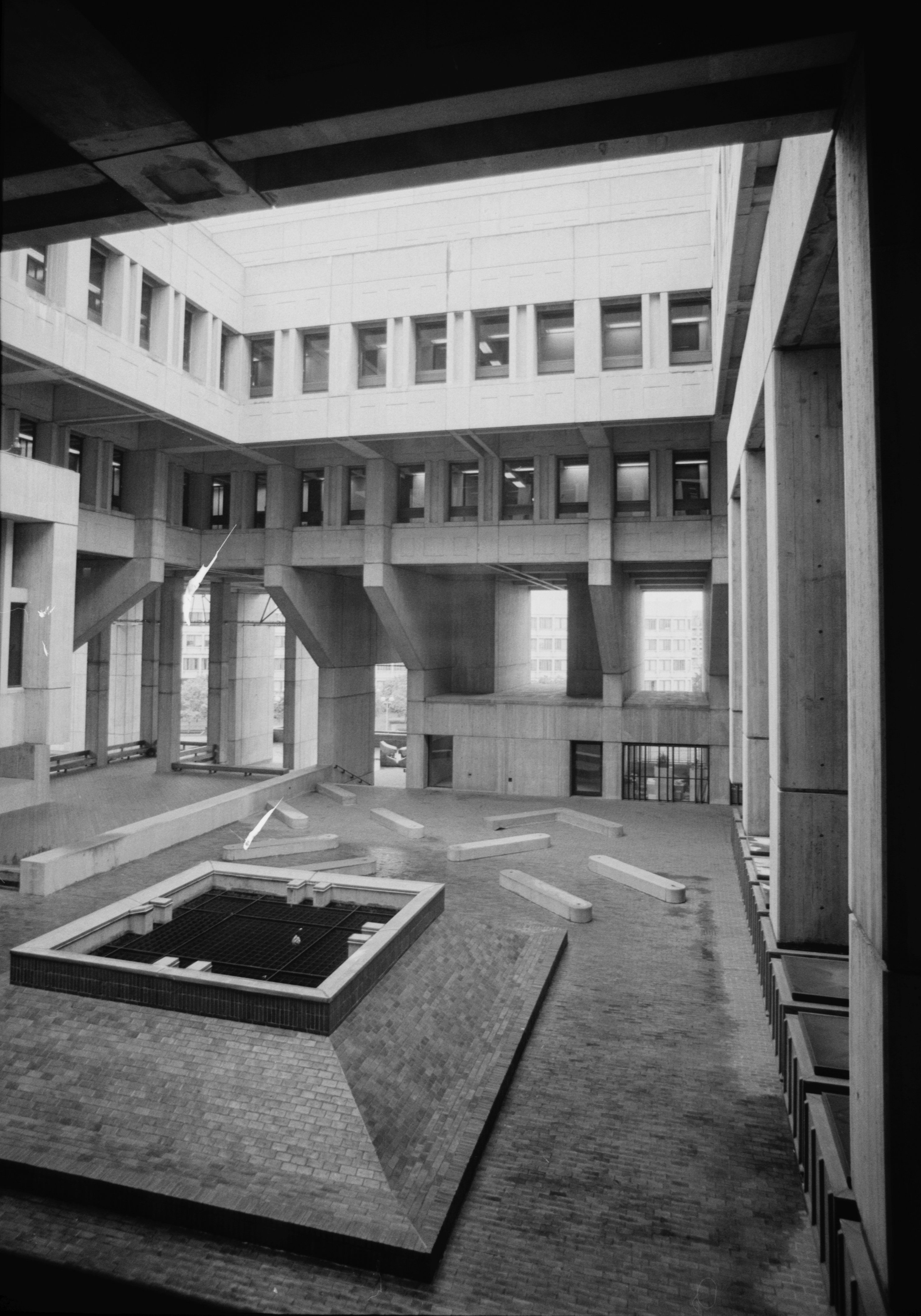
Boston City Hall's interior courtyard

Some of the New England structures designed by CAN in a modernist and frequently brutalist idiom are Boston's 100 Federal Street 37-floor skyscraper, formerly known as the First National Bank Building and nicknamed the Pregnant Building; the Lederle Graduate Research Center at the UMass Amherst; the Merrill Science Center at Amherst College; the Weiss Science Tower at Rockefeller University; the Murdough Center at Dartmouth College; and Boston City Hall (as associate architects). A 1976 poll of architects, historians and critics conducted by the American Institute of Architects listed the Boston City Hall with Thomas Jefferson's University of Virginia campus and Frank Lloyd Wright's Fallingwater as one of the ten proudest achievements of American architecture in the nation's first two hundred years.

== Restorations ==
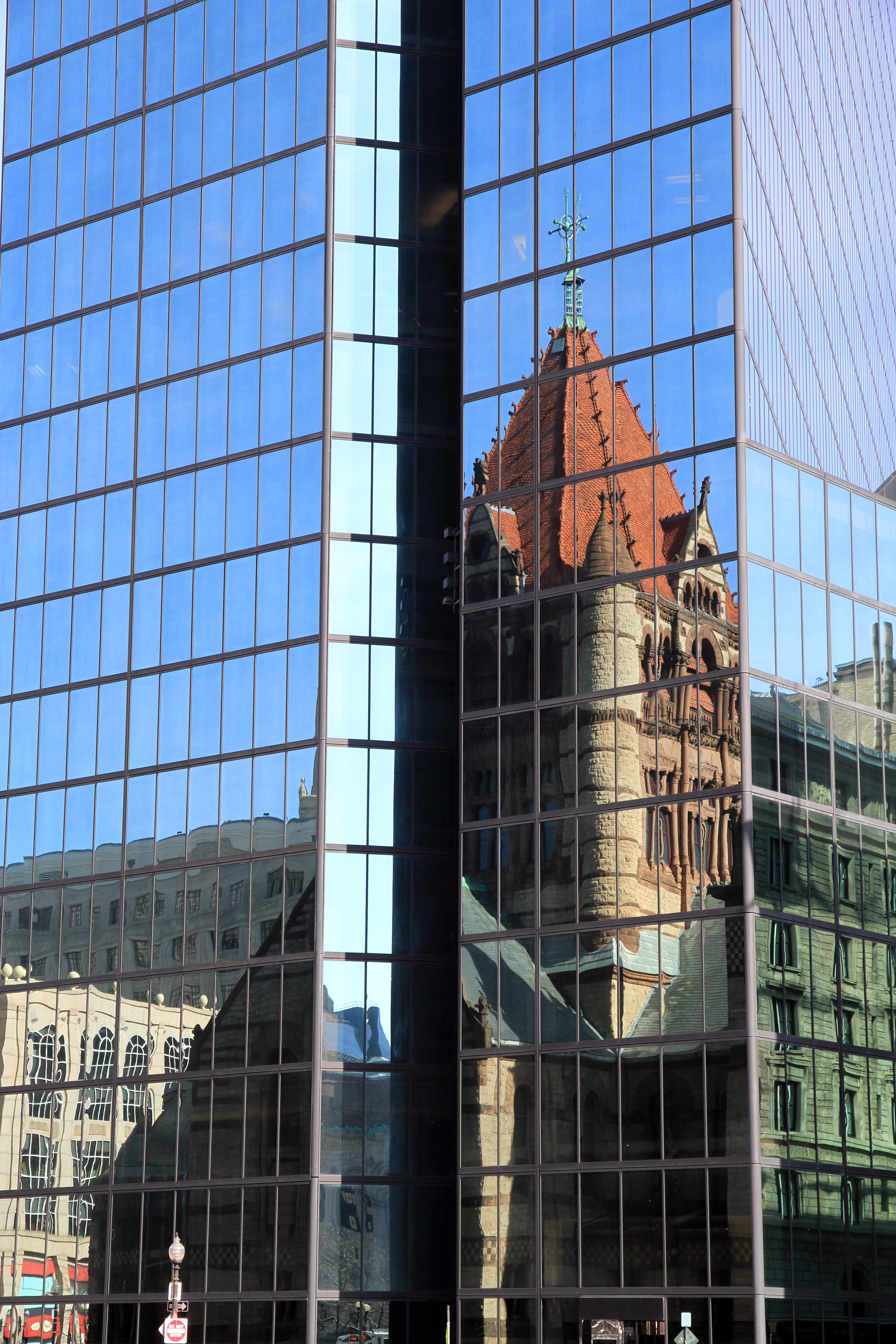
A reflection of Trinity Church in Boston

CAN also completed renovations of some of Massachusetts' best known historical buildings, including modern annexes for some. Notable among these renovations and additions are those at Trinity Church (Boston), the only church in the United States and the only building in Boston considered by the American Institute of Architects to be one of the "Ten Most Significant Buildings in the United States"; Emmanuel Episcopal Church, Boston; and Salem, Massachusetts' John Tucker Daland House.

== Partners ==
=== Walter Campbell ===
Walter Edward Campbell (died 1993)) studied architecture at the Massachusetts Institute of Technology and received his degree in 1926. He was named a Fellow of the American Institute of Architects in 1959.

=== Nelson Aldrich ===
Nelson Wilmarth Aldrich (1911–1986) was the son of William Truman Aldrich and grandson of Senator Nelson Wilmarth Aldrich (1841-1915), making him a nephew of Abby Aldrich (Rockefeller) (wife of John D. Rockefeller Jr.) and thus the cousin of her son, Vice President Nelson Aldrich Rockefeller. He studied under Walter Gropius and Marcel Breuer at the Harvard Graduate School of Design and received his architecture degree in 1938. He joined Campbell in 1946 and was named a Fellow of the American Institute of Architects in 1958.

He was an American modernist architect and a proponent of correlating theories of urbanism and urban planning. He was elected a fellow of the American Academy of Arts and Sciences in 1964. A Boston civic leader, in the 1960s, Aldrich was appointed a distinguished member of that city's Urban Renewal Design Advisory Committee. He was a trustee of the Institute of Contemporary Art, Boston (1947-1960), the Boston Arts Festival (1955–62), the Metropolitan Boston Arts Center (1959-1963), the Rhode Island School of Design (1955-1962), Radcliffe College (1957-1972), and the Boston Architectural Center (1968-1973).

=== Lawrence Nulty ===
Lawrence Frederick Nulty (1921–2019) received his architecture degree from Yale University in 1952. He joined Campbell & Aldrich in 1955.
