= John Gurdon (died 1623) =

English politician

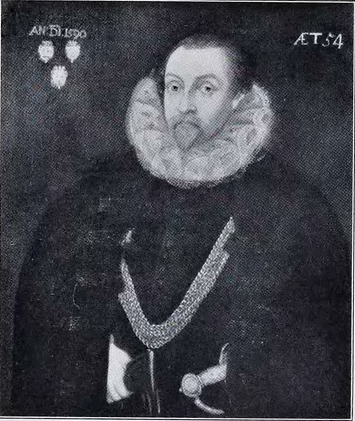
- Died: 21 September 1623
- Spouse(s): Amy Brampton
- Children: Brampton Gurdon
- Parent(s): Robert Gurdon; Rose Sexton
- Position held: Member of the 1571 Parliament

John Gurdon (c. 1544 – 21 September 1623) was an English landowner and politician who sat in the House of Commons in 1571.

Gurdon was the son of Robert Gurdon of Assington, Suffolk and his wife Rose Sexton, daughter of Robert Sexton of Lavenham, Suffolk and widow of William Appleton of Little Waldingfield. He was a student of Inner Temple in 1558.

In 1571, Gurdon was elected Member of Parliament (MP) for Sudbury. He succeeded to Assington on the death of his father in 1578 and was a J.P. for Suffolk from about 1579. In 1585 he was Sheriff of Suffolk.

Gurdon died at the age of about 78 in 1623.

Gurdon married Amy Brampton, daughter of William Brampton of Letton, Norfolk through whom he acquired the estate of Letton. They had a daughter and a son Brampton who also became MP for Sudbury.

Parliament of England
Preceded by John Heigham; Thomas Andrews	Member of Parliament for Sudbury; 1571; With: John Hunt	Succeeded by Richard Eden; Martin Cole
