= Cranworth =

Village in Norfolk, in England

Coordinates: 52.603518°N 0.927043°E

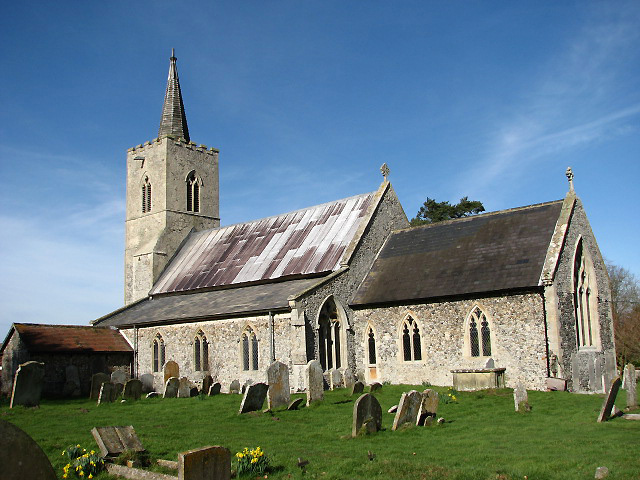
- St. Mary's Church

- Location within Norfolk
- Area: 20.62 km^{2} (7.96 sq mi)
- Population: 468 (2021 census)
  - Density: 23/km^{2} (60/sq mi)
- OS grid reference: TF9831004660
- District: Breckland
- Shire county: Norfolk
- Region: East
- Country: England
- Sovereign state: United Kingdom
- Post town: Thetford
- Postcode district: IP25
- Dialling code: 01362
- Police: Norfolk
- Fire: Norfolk
- Ambulance: East of England
- UK Parliament: South West Norfolk

Cranworth is a village and civil parish in the Breckland district of the English county of Norfolk.

Cranworth is located 4.7 miles (7.6 km) north-east of Watton and 16 miles (26 km) west of Norwich.

== History ==
Cranworth's name is of Anglo-Saxon origin and derives from the Old English for an enclosed part of land with cranes and herons.

In the Domesday Book, Cranworth is recorded as a settlement of 42 households located in the hundred of Mitford. In 1086, the village formed part of the estates of King William.

== Geography ==
According to the 2021 census, Cranworth has a population of 468 people which shows an increase from the 419 people recorded in the 2011 census.

== St. Mary's Church ==
Cranworth's parish church is dedicated to Saint Mary and dates from the Thirteenth Century. St. Mary's is located off Woodrising Road and has been Grade I listed since 1960.

St. Mary's churchtower is topped with a medieval spire whilst the interior was heavily restored in the Victorian era. The church holds various memorials to members of the Gurdon family who lived at nearby Letton Hall.

St. Mary's Churchyard holds the grave of Pilot Officer Noel G. Cromie who was killed in a flying accident when his Miles Martinet lost power over The Wash.

== Notable residents ==
- Robert Rolfe PC, Baron Cranworth- (1790–1868) lawyer and politician, born in Cranworth.

== Governance ==
Cranworth is part of the electoral ward of Shipdham & Scarning for local elections and is part of the district of Breckland.

The village's national constituency is South West Norfolk which has been represented by Labour's Terry Jermy MP since 2024.

== War memorial ==
Cranworth War Memorial is a stone memorial in St. Mary's Churchyard with also lists war dead from Letton and Southburgh. The memorial lists the following people from Cranworth and Southburgh:

Rank	Name	Unit	Date of death	Burial
LCpl.	Frederick C. Ward	63rd Bn., Machine Gun Corps	3 Sep. 1918	Vis-en-Artois Memorial
LCpl.	Robert R. Tuttle	1st Bn., Norfolk Regiment	17 Sep. 1916	Delville Wood Cemetery
Dvr.	William F. Lyon	Army Service Corps	5 Feb. 1919	Maubeuge Cemetery
Pte.	Victor Edwards	8th Bn., Border Regiment	5 Jul. 1916	Thiepval Memorial
Pte.	Ernest W. Graves	6th Bn., The Buffs	19 Mar. 1918	Cite Bonjean Cemetery
Pte.	F. Samuel Sidell	1st Bn., Royal Irish Fusiliers	24 Aug. 1918	Ploegsteert Memorial
Pte.	Frederick J. Green	61st Bn., Machine Gun Corps	21 Mar. 1918	Pozières Memorial
Pte.	John Hagan	2nd Bn., Norfolk Regiment	22 Apr. 1916	Basra Memorial
Pte.	Lionel W. Green	1/5th Bn., Norfolk Regt.	19 Apr. 1917	Gaza War Cemetery
Pte.	Jonathan Berry	7th Bn., Norfolk Regt.	20 Nov. 1917	Feuchy Cemetery
Pte.	Sidney Hipkin	9th Bn., Norfolk Regt.	8 Oct. 1918	Montbrehain Cemetery
Pte.	Bartlett J. Hart	1st Bn., Queen's Royal Regiment	25 Sep. 1917	Tyne Cot

And, the following for the Second World War:

Rank	Name	Unit	Date of death	Burial/Commemoration
AS	Geoffrey G. Ebbage	HMS Calcutta	1 Jun. 1941	Chatham Naval Memorial
Gnr.	George W. F. Graves	71 (Anti-Air) Regt., Royal Artillery	3 Dec. 1942	St. Andrew's Churchyard
Pte.	Albert C. Clarke	1st Bn., Hampshire Regiment	30 Jul. 1944	Bayeux War Cemetery
