= Radek Gardoň =

Czech ice hockey player (born 1969)

- Born: April 19, 1969 (age 56)
- Height: 5 ft 9 in (175 cm)
- Weight: 168 lb (76 kg; 12 st 0 lb)
- Position: Centre
- Shot: Left
- Played for: HC Kladno; HC Vsetín; HC Zlín
- Playing career: 1986–2009

Radek Gardoň (born April 19, 1969) is a Czech former professional ice hockey centre.

Gardoň played 600 games in the Czech Extraliga, playing for HC Kladno, HC Vsetín and HC Zlín. He also played two seasons in the Japan Ice Hockey League for Furukawa Ice Hockey Club between 1997 and 1999.

Gardoň played in the 1988 and 1989 World Junior Ice Hockey Championships for Czechoslovakia.

Gardoň is currently active in coaching of young hockey-players.

== Career statistics ==
			Regular season					Playoffs
Season	Team	League	GP	G	A	Pts	PIM	GP	G	A	Pts	PIM
1985–86	Rytiri Kladno U20	Czechoslovakia U20	39	30	21	51	—	—	—	—	—	—
1986–87	TJ Kladno	Czech2	15	7	4	11	6	5	1	0	1	2
1987–88	TJ Kladno	Czechoslovakia	31	5	3	8	2	13	2	3	5	4
1988–89	ASD Dukla Jihlava B	Czech2	—	7	—	—	—	—	—	—	—	—
1989–90	HC Tábor	Czech3	32	19	16	35	—	—	—	—	—	—
1990–91	TJ Kladno	Czechoslovakia	44	7	11	18	24	—	—	—	—	—
1991–92	HC Kladno	Czechoslovakia	28	15	10	25	24	8	1	3	4	10
1992–93	HC Kladno	Czechoslovak Extraliga	36	9	20	29	12	5	0	2	2	0
1993–94	HC Kladno	Czech	37	21	25	46	18	11	4	12	16	6
1994–95	EC Bad Tölz	Germany2	46	32	55	87	36	—	—	—	—	—
1997–98	Furukawa Ice Hockey Club	JIHL	40	21	32	53	53	—	—	—	—	—
1998–99	Furukawa Ice Hockey Club	JIHL	35	15	15	30	18	—	—	—	—	—
1999–00	HC Kladno	Czech	45	3	21	24	45	—	—	—	—	—
2000–01	HC Kladno	Czech	32	15	17	32	28	—	—	—	—	—
2001–02	HC Kladno	Czech	46	19	15	34	57	—	—	—	—	—
2002–03	HC Vsetín	Czech	10	3	8	11	8	—	—	—	—	—
2002–03	HC Kladno	Czech2	17	6	7	13	18	7	6	3	9	8
2003–04	HC Kladno	Czech	47	12	15	27	24	—	—	—	—	—
2004–05	HC Kladno	Czech	45	7	9	16	32	7	2	3	5	4
2005–06	HC Kladno	Czech	44	7	14	21	80	—	—	—	—	—
2005–06	HC Hamé Zlin	Czech	6	3	2	5	4	6	2	2	4	6
2006–07	HC Kladno	Czech	48	10	20	30	40	3	1	0	1	2
2007–08	HC Kladno	Czech	44	6	5	11	42	9	0	0	0	6
2008–09	HC Řisuty	Czech3	30	16	27	43	79	—	—	—	—	—
Czech totals			404	106	151	257	378	36	9	17	26	24
