= Letton Hall =

House in Cranworth, Norfolk, England

Coordinates: 52.6147°N 0.9110°E

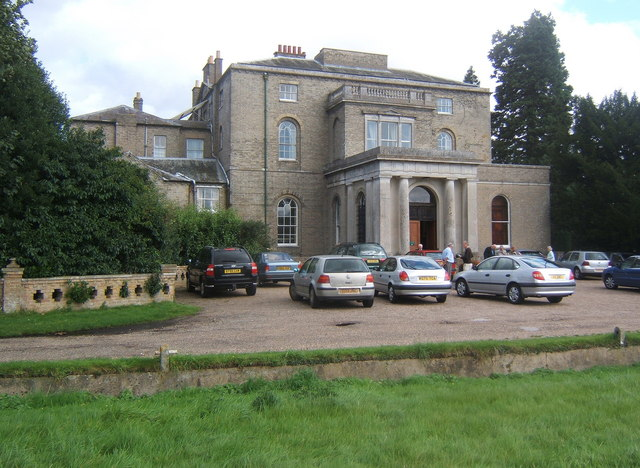
Letton Hall

Letton Hall is a Grade II listed eighteenth-century Neoclassical stately home designed by Sir John Soane for the Gurdon family between 1783 and 1789. It is located at Letton near Shipdham, Norfolk.

== History ==
=== Construction ===
The house was Sir John Soane's first domestic commission, which he designed in 1783 and constructed during the following six years for Brampton Gurdon Dillingham. This replaced the Old Hall, which Dillingham had inherited in 1783, but had been convinced by Soane to demolish.

Soane designed a three-storey main block on a square plan, with a lower service block to the west. It was built in white brick with Portland stone dressings and originally had a Doric porch, since replaced by a two-storey addition. Despite this and other alterations, Soane's interiors remain largely intact.

=== Victorian and Edwardian Period ===
The house passed through the Gurdon family throughout the 19th century. Following the death of John Brampton Gurdon in 1881, his son Robert Thornhagh Gurdon commissioned Edward Boardman to renovate the site, changes including the construction of the clock-tower and summer-house and a remodelling of the gardens. Bertram Francis Gurdon succeeded to the estate in 1899, aged 25, and extended the library to create a billiards room. However he put the property up for auction in 1914, at the eve of the First World War, and moved to his family estates in Woodbridge.

=== Twentieth Century ===
At the 1914 auction, the estate was purchased by Arthur Gordon, who moved in after the conclusion of the war. Gordon improved the utilities of the Hall, but, after its requisition during the Second World War, put the estate up for sale. It was purchased by George Eglington, who developed the estate into a successful agricultural venture, notably breeding Welsh Pigs and Polled Friesian Cattle. While the Eglingtons still farm the estate, after George Eglington's death, the Hall was separated from the grazing land and once more put up for sale.

In 1979 Peter Carroll bought Letton Hall and ten acres of gardens to create a conference and activity centre; Mary, his wife, died just six months after their arrival, but their project was completed.

=== Present Day ===
The hall is now mainly used for Christian conferences, youth camps and school trips. The hall includes its own purpose-built karting track.
