= Adam Gordon (businessman) =

American real estate developer

- Born: September 23, 1960 (age 65); New York, U.S.
- Education: University of Michigan, Wharton School
- Occupation: Real estate developer
- Spouse: Kristina O'Neal

Adam I Gordon (born September 23, 1960) is an American environmentalist and real estate developer known for his contributions to sustainable agriculture and urban development. He is the co-founder and managing partner of Wildflower Studios alongside Robert De Niro. Gordon has been a member of the Directors' Council at the Scripps Institution of Oceanography, where he helped develop the institution's 100-year plan.

He has collaborated with researchers from Stanford University to devise a fire resilience strategy for the ecosystem of Knights Valley.

== Biography ==
Biography Adam Gordon was born in New York, U.S., on September 23, 1960. He completed his undergraduate studies at the University of Michigan, earning a Bachelor of Arts degree in International Relations. He later obtained an MBA in finance from The Wharton School.

== Career ==
Gordon began his career in real estate development, co-founding Madison Development. His work primarily focused on urban infill self-storage facilities and single-family townhouse development. He collaborated with architect Steven Harris to create a collection of homes in New York City. One of Gordon's residential developments is 92 Jane Street.

Gordon's environmental interests led him to collaborate with researchers from Stanford University to devise a fire resilience strategy for the ecosystem of Knights Valley. His work in sustainable agriculture is exemplified by Knights Valley Wagyu, where he employs ranching methods that prioritize animal welfare and ecological balance. These methods include allowing cows to roam freely, restoring overgrazed areas, and banning pesticides and hormones. Gordon's ranching methods include allowing cows to roam freely, restoring areas that have been overgrazed, and implementing bans on pesticides and hormones.

Gordon is the managing partner of Wildflower Ltd., a company known for pioneering real estate strategies in New York. Wildflower Ltd. is particularly noted for developing Wildflower Studios in Queens—a vertical village for film production designed by Bjarke Ingels and developed in collaboration with Robert De Niro.

As the managing partner of Wildflower LTD, Gordon has played a role in developing modern e-commerce warehouses, including leasing the first modern e-commerce warehouse in NYC to Amazon. Wildflower Ltd. has since become one of Amazon's most active developers in the city.

== Environmental and Philanthropic Efforts ==
Gordon is an emeritus member of the Directors' Council at the Scripps Institution of Oceanography. He has worked on initiatives that aim to protect marine ecosystems and promote responsible environmental practices.
