= Assington =

Village in Suffolk, England

Coordinates: 52.007°N 0.816°E

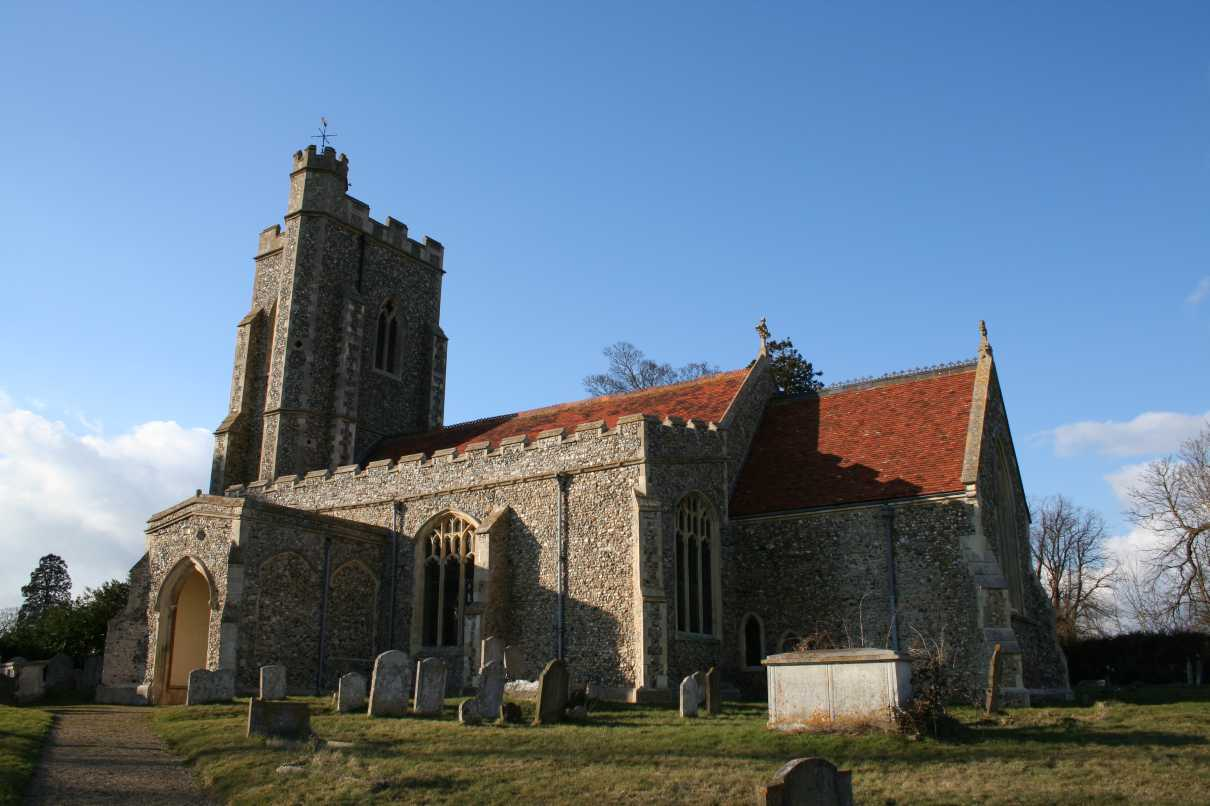
- St Edmund's church, Assington.

- Location within Suffolk
- Interactive map of Assington
- Area: 11.20 km^{2} (4.32 sq mi)
- Population: 402 (2011)
  - Density: 36/km^{2} (93/sq mi)
- OS grid reference: TL934381
- District: Babergh
- Shire county: Suffolk
- Region: East
- Country: England
- Sovereign state: United Kingdom
- Post town: SUDBURY
- Postcode district: CO10
- Dialling code: 01787
- Police: Suffolk
- Fire: Suffolk
- Ambulance: East of England
- UK Parliament: South Suffolk

Assington is a village in Suffolk, England, 4 miles (6.4 km) south-east of Sudbury. At the 2011 Census it had a population of 402, estimated at 445 in 2019. The parish includes the hamlets of Rose Green and Dorking Tye.

== History ==
According to Eilert Ekwall, the meaning of the name is "homestead of Assi". Before the Norman Conquest, the village was held by Siward Barn. The Domesday Book of 1086 records the village as being made up of 78 households including 5 villagers, 6 freemen, 55 smallholders, and 12 slaves along with 23 cattle, 60 pigs, 90 sheep, 12 goats, 6 beehives, 30 pigs, 1 mill, and 16 acres of meadow. At the time the Lord and tenant in chief of the village was Ranulf Peverel 78 households implies a population similar to that of today

A church on the site of St Edmunds was recorded in the Domesday Book, with the earliest recorded mention of a vicar being in 1349 and that of a dedication to St Edmund in 1459.

== Historic buildings ==
The parish church is dedicated to St Edmund the Martyr and built of flint and dressed stone. It dates from the 15th century and was restored in the 19th century. A ring of six bells hangs in the tower, the largest of them weighing about 10.5 cwt (533 kg). All six were cast and hung in 1890 by John Warner & Sons in a modified frame. Ringing is currently prohibited.

Assington Hall, which is adjacent to the church, was the home of the Gurdon family for several centuries. John Gurdon (c. 1544–1623) was elected a Member of Parliament for the borough of Sudbury, Suffolk, in 1571, as was his son Brampton Gurdon (died 1648) in 1621, who became High Sheriff of Suffolk in 1629.

Later members of the Gordon family were involved in local charities through the 18th century. The hall was pulled down in 1957 after a fire, but the stables and coach house remain and are grade II listed.

== Transport ==
Assington is served on Monday to Saturday by daytime buses between Sudbury and Colchester. The nearest railway station is at Bures (about 3 miles – 5 km – away). Hourly trains to and from Marks Tey link with mainline trains to and from London and Colchester.

== Amenities ==
The village has a farm shop, a pub-restaurant (the Shoulder of Mutton), a village hall and a post office, all in The Street running off the main A134 road between Sudbury and Colchester.
