= Letton, Norfolk =

Former civil parish in Norfolk, England

Coordinates: 52.616°N 0.911°E

Letton
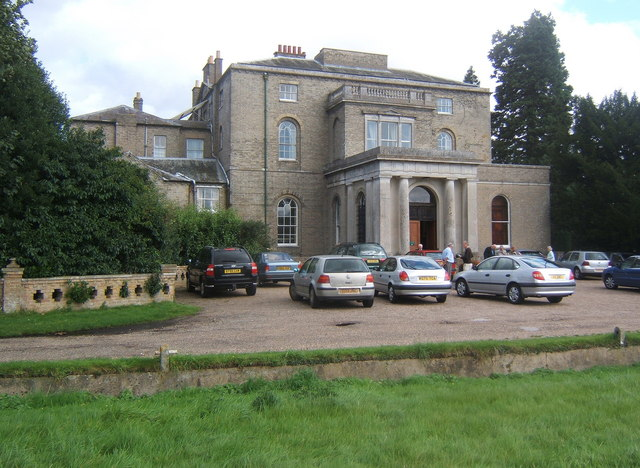
- Letton Hall

- Location within Norfolk
- Civil parish: Cranworth
- District: Breckland
- Shire county: Norfolk
- Region: East
- Country: England
- Sovereign state: United Kingdom
- Post town: THETFORD
- Postcode district: IP25
- Dialling code: 01362

Letton is a former village and civil parish, now part of the parish of Cranworth, in the Breckland district of Norfolk, England. The settlement is south-east of Shipdham and about 5 miles (8 km) south-west of Dereham. In 1931 the parish had a population of 83. On 1 April 1935 the parish was abolished and merged with Cranworth.

The main building in Letton is Letton Hall a Grade II listed building, now mainly a religious holiday centre. The property was formerly owned by the Gurdon family. The former church of All Saints is now a ruin.
