= Mary Hervey =

English courtier (d. 1768)

The Right Honourable The Lady Hervey
- Born: Mary Lepell c. 1700
- Died: 2 September 1768 (aged 67–68)
- Burial place: Ickworth, England, United Kingdom
- Spouse: John Hervey (m. 1720)
- Children: 8, including George, Augustus and Frederick

Mary Hervey, Lady Hervey (née Lepell; c. 1700 – 2 September 1768) was an English courtier.

== Family and early life ==
Born around 1700, Mary Lepell was the daughter of Brigadier-general Nicholas Wedig Lepell and his wife, Mary Brooke, daughter and co-heiress of John Brooke of Rendlesham, Suffolk. Her tombstone states that she was born on 26 September 1700; there is, however, some uncertainty about the date of her birth and the baptism registers state it was 16 September 1699.

Her father was born in Germany. While a page of honour to Prince George of Denmark, he married in 1698, and in the following year obtained an act of naturalisation. On 3 April 1705, he received a Commission to raise a new regiment of foot, and on 1 January 1710 was promoted to the rank of brigadier-general, before being appointed Supreme Commander of the British Forces in Spain, which position he held until 1712.

In 1715, through family connections, she was appointed a maid of honour to Queen Caroline. According to a letter written by the Duchess of Marlborough in December 1737, Mary was made a cornet by her father "in his regiment as soon as she was born … and she was paid many years after she was a maid of honour. She was extreme forward and pert, and my Lord Sunderland got her a pension of the late king George I, it being too ridiculous to continue her any longer an officer in the army."

== Encomia ==
At court, Mary Lepell divided the honours for wit and beauty with her friend Mary Bellenden, subsequently the wife of Colonel John Campbell, who became the fourth Duke of Argyll. Pope and Gay sang her praises. William Pulteney, first Earl of Bath, and Philip Dormer Stanhope, fourth Earl of Chesterfield wrote a joint ballad in her honour to the tune of "Molly Mogg". Even Horace Walpole, who became a correspondent of hers later in life, and in 1762 dedicated to her his Anecdotes of Painting in England, always spoke of her with the greatest respect and admiration. Her good sense and good nature won for her the esteem of the ladies as well as the flatteries of the wits.

== Marriage ==
Her marriage with John Hervey, afterwards 2nd Baron Hervey of Ickworth, was announced to have taken place on 25 October 1720. It must, however, have occurred several months earlier (21 April 1720), as in a letter preserved at Ickworth, and dated 20 May 1720, Lord Bristol congratulates her on her marriage, which he calls a secret. Lady Mary Wortley Montagu records, in a letter written to the Countess of Mar, in July 1721, "the ardent affection" shown to her by Mrs Hervey and "her dear spouse".

They had eight children:

1. Lady Mary Hervey (c. 1720–), married 31 October 1745 George FitzGerald of Turlough, County Mayo and had issue, including the notoriously eccentric landowner and duellist George Robert FitzGerald ("Fighting FitzGerald"), hanged for conspiracy to murder in 1786
2. Hon. George William Hervey, later 3rd Baron Hervey, later 2nd Earl of Bristol (1721–1775), died unmarried
3. Lady Lepell Hervey (15 April 1723 – 11 May 1780), married 26 February 1742–3 Constantine John Phipps, 1st Baron Mulgrave, and had issue
4. Hon. Augustus John Hervey, later 3rd Earl of Bristol (1724–1779), died without legitimate issue
5. Hon. Frederick Augustus Hervey, later 4th Earl of Bristol (1730–1803), married 1752 Elizabeth Davers, and had issue (including Lady Elizabeth Foster)
6. General Hon. William Hervey (13 May 1732 – 1815), died unmarried
7. Lady Amelia Caroline Nassau Hervey (1734–1814), died unmarried
8. Lady Caroline Hervey (1736–1819), died unmarried

Despite her husband's reported infidelity, she lived with him on apparently amicable terms, and reared a large family of children, who inherited those qualities which gave rise to the well-known saying — ascribed to Lady Mary Wortley Montagu among others — "that this world consisted of men, women, and Herveys". She appears to have been always a partisan of the Stuarts. Though she suffered from severe attacks of the gout, she was said to have retained many of the attractions of her youth long after her husband's death.

In a letter to his son dated 22 October 1750, Chesterfield directed him to "trust, consult, and to apply" to Lady Hervey at Paris. He speaks in the most admiring terms of her good breeding, and says that she knows more than is necessary for any woman, "for she understands Latin perfectly well, though she wisely conceals it".

== Death and legacy ==
She died on 2 September 1768, aged 68, and was buried at Ickworth, Suffolk. The epitaph on her tombstone was written by Horace Walpole.

Lady Hervey was a lively and intelligent letter writer. Her letters to the Rev. Edmund Morris, formerly tutor to her sons, written between 1742 and 1768, were published in 1821. Several earlier letters of hers written to the Countess of Suffolk are in the two volumes of Lady Suffolk's Letters, 1824.

Two portraits of Lady Hervey are in the possession of the National Trust at Ickworth. Another, formerly belonging to the Strawberry Hill collection, painted by Allan Ramsay, was lent by Lord Lifford to the Exhibition of National Portraits at South Kensington in 1867. An engraving from a miniature, also formerly at Strawberry Hill, is in Walpole's Letters.
