= William FitzRoy =

William FitzRoy may refer to:

- William FitzRoy, 3rd Duke of Cleveland (1698–1774), English nobleman
- William FitzRoy (British Army Officer) (1830–1902), British Army officer
- Lord William FitzRoy (1782–1857), British Royal Navy officer
- William FitzRoy, 6th Duke of Grafton (1819–1882), British peer and politician
