= Baron Southampton =

Barony in the Peerage of Great Britain

- Blazon: Arms: Quarterly: 1st and 4th, France and England quarterly; 2nd, Scotland, 3rd, Ireland; the whole debruised by a Baton Sinister compony Argent and Azure, and with a Crescent for difference.; Crests: On a Chapeau Gules turned up Ermine a Lion statant guardant Or ducally crowned Azure and gorged with a Collar compony Argent and Azure.; Supporters: Dexter: A Lion guardant Or ducally crowned Azure and gorged with a Collar compony Argent and Blue; Sinister: A Greyhound Argent gorged as the dexter supporter
- Creation date: 17 October 1780
- Created by: King George III
- Peerage: Peerage of Great Britain
- First holder: Charles FitzRoy, 1st Baron Southampton
- Present holder: Edward Charles FitzRoy, 7th Baron Southampton
- Heir apparent: the Hon. Charles Edward Millett FitzRoy
- Status: Extant
- Motto: ET DECUS ET PRETIUM RECTI (The ornament and recompense of virtue)

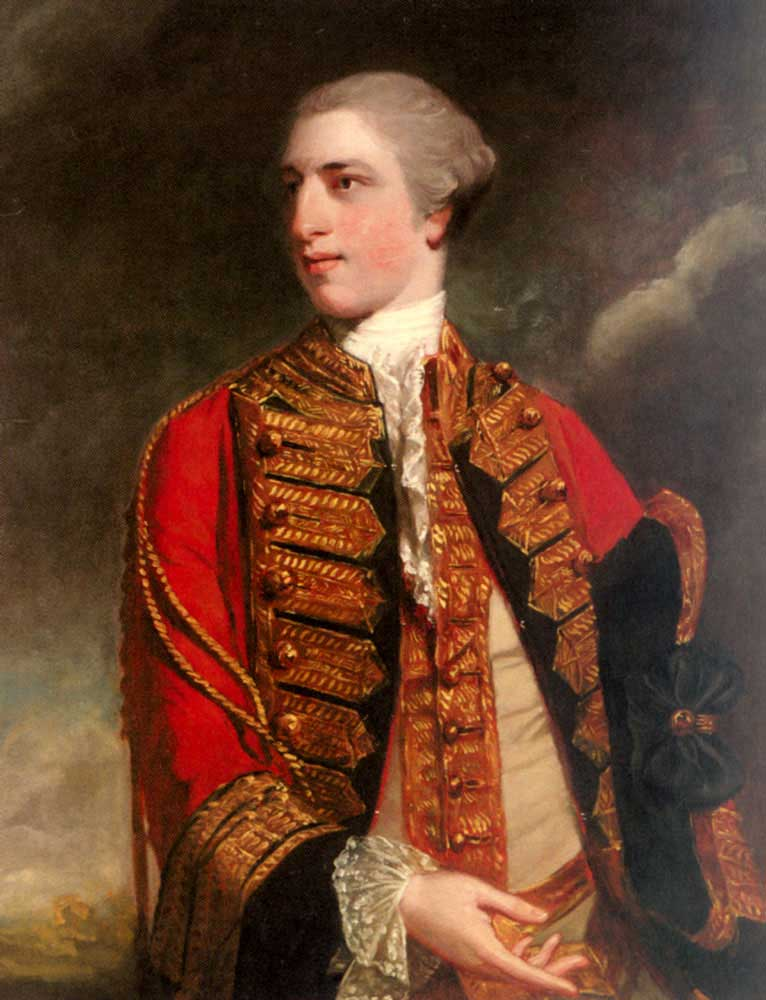
Charles FitzRoy, 1st Baron Southampton

Baron Southampton, of Southampton in the County of Hampshire, is a title in the Peerage of Great Britain. It was created in 1780 for the soldier and politician Charles FitzRoy. He was the third son of Lord Augustus FitzRoy, second son of Charles FitzRoy, 2nd Duke of Grafton, while Prime Minister Augustus FitzRoy, 3rd Duke of Grafton was his elder brother. Lord Southampton was also the great-great-grandson (through an illegitimate line) of King Charles II by his mistress Barbara Palmer, 1st Duchess of Cleveland. The Southampton title had previously been created for Charles FitzRoy, eldest natural son of Charles II and the Duchess of Cleveland and the elder brother of Henry FitzRoy, 1st Duke of Grafton, but had become extinct in 1774 on the death of his son William FitzRoy, 3rd Duke of Cleveland and 2nd Duke of Southampton, six years before the creation of the barony of Southampton.

The first Baron Southampton's grandson, the third Baron, notably served as Lord-Lieutenant of Northamptonshire from 1867 to 1872. Lord Southampton was succeeded by his eldest son, the fourth Baron. He held the title for 86 years and 144 days, the fourth longest time anyone has held a peerage (the others being the 7th Marquess Townshend 88 years, the 13th Lord Sinclair, 87 years, and the 3rd Baron Montagu of Beaulieu (86 years and 155 days)). His son, the fifth Baron, disclaimed the title on 16 March 1964. Since 2015 the title has been held by his grandson, the seventh Baron.

Several other members of this branch of the FitzRoy family also gained distinction. Henry FitzRoy, second son of the second Baron, was a politician. Edward FitzRoy, second son of the third Baron, served as Speaker of the House of Commons from 1928 until his death in 1943. In 1943 his widow was created Viscountess Daventry in his honour. William FitzRoy (1830–1902), a great-grandson of the first Baron, was a major-general in the army.

== Barons Southampton (1780) ==
- Charles FitzRoy, 1st Baron Southampton (1737–1797)
- George Ferdinand FitzRoy, 2nd Baron Southampton (1761–1810)
- Charles FitzRoy, 3rd Baron Southampton (1804–1872)
- Charles Henry FitzRoy, 4th Baron Southampton (1867–1958)
- Charles FitzRoy, 5th Baron Southampton (1904–1989) (disclaimed 1964)
- Charles James FitzRoy, 6th Baron Southampton (1928–2015)
- Edward Charles FitzRoy, 7th Baron Southampton (b. 1955)

The heir apparent is the present holder's son The Hon. Charles Edward Millett FitzRoy (b. 1983).

== See also ==
- Duke of Grafton
- Duke of Southampton
- Viscount Daventry
