= Thomas Hervey (politician) =

English pamphleteer and politician (1699–1775)

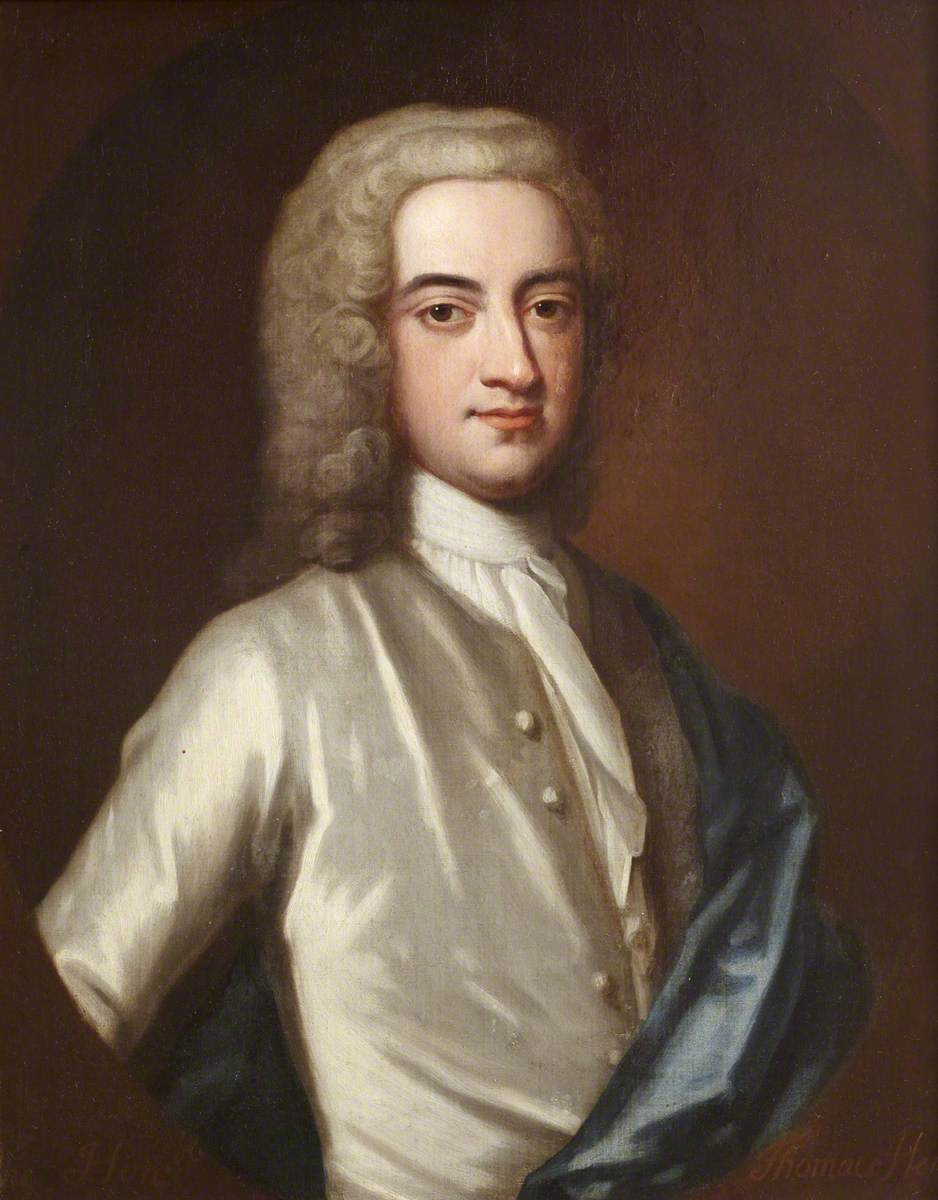
The Honourable Thomas Hervey (1699–1775), MP by John Fayram (active 1713–1743)

Thomas Hervey (20 January 1699 – 1775), of Bond Street, London, was an English pamphleteer and politician who sat in the House of Commons from 1733 to 1747. He became embroiled with the wife of a neighbour who left her husband, and the ensuing dispute brought him to the brink of madness. He was noted for his eccentric open letters.

== Life ==
Hervey was the second son of John Hervey, 1st Earl of Bristol, MP and his second wife Elizabeth Felton, daughter of Sir Thomas Felton, 4th Baronet of Playford, Suffolk. He was educated at Westminster School from 1712 to 1717 and matriculated at Christ Church, Oxford on 10 May 1717 aged 17. He was taken away from Oxford to study law at Lincoln's Inn where he was admitted on 17 February 1720. He was thus denied what he desired, a post in the army; and gave himself up to drink, with the result that, as his allowance from his father was only £120 per annum, he ‘many, many times wanted a dinner.’ At an early age he was engaged in two duels, and was nearly involved in a third. His ill-health was chronic. For eleven years he was unable to lie in his bed ‘one single night from night to morning;’ he was racked by a ‘constant fever, for which in 17 or 18 years he had been blooded more than 100 times,’ and before he was of age his mind was ‘unhinged.’

Hervey was appointed Equerry to Queen Caroline in 1728. He was returned as Member of Parliament for the family seat at Bury St Edmunds at a by-election on 29 June 1733. He was returned again at the 1734 In 1737, his brother Lord Hervey procured him a present of money from Walpole, and in 1738, a post of £500 p.a. as surveyor of the King's gardens in place of his equerry position.

In 1737, the wife of Sir Thomas Hanmer, 4th Baronet, a considerable heiress, left her husband and put herself under Hervey's protection. In 1739 she made a will bequeathing to Hervey the reversion of her estates in Cambridgeshire, Middlesex, Anglesey and Caernarvonshire, which had been settled ‘after death of me and my husband and failure of issue of my body to the use of such person or persons as I should appoint’. She also asked to Hanmer to leave to Hervey her principal estate of Barton, Suffolk, which he had acquired absolutely under their marriage settlement. Hervey's mother disinherited him for his refusal to separate himself from Colonel Thomas Norton, his colleague in the representation of Bury St. Edmunds. His income through his places and the property which he acquired from Lady Hanmer amounted to £2,000 per annum. Lady Hanmer died on 24 March 1741 and Hanmer ignored her request regarding Barton. He also started cutting down timber of one of the reversionary estates. The ensuing dispute with Sir Thomas Hanmer had an effect on Hervey's ‘distressed mind in a distempered body’ and drove Hervey mad to the extent that he was admitted to an asylum. Hervey was returned as MP for Bury St Edmunds at the 1741 and continued to vote with the government except in an important vote on the chairman of the elections committee in December 1741, when he erratically voted with the Opposition. His only explanation was ‘Jesus knows my thoughts, one day I blaspheme and pray the next’ which prompted Horace Walpole to say ‘Tom Hervey is quite mad’.

In August 1745, Hervey married (it is said in the Fleet prison in 1744) Anne Coghlan, daughter of Francis Coghlan, counsellor at law in Ireland, after she had lived with him for some time, and their son. When Hanmer died in 1746, Hervey succeeded to all his wife's estates except Barton which went to Hanmer's nephew. Hervey decided not to stand at the 1747 British general election.

Hervey felt aggrieved over several matters and carried on writing open letters ‘full of madness and wit’. He died on 18 January 1775 leaving a natural son by Lady Hanmer, Thomas, an officer in the first regiment of foot-guards, who, on 26 February 1774, had leave to drop the name of Hanmer and to use the name and arms of Hervey. His legitimate son William Thomas, aide-de-camp to General Shirley, was killed at Fort Ticonderoga. Samuel Johnson wrote of Hervey ‘Tom Hervey, though a vicious man, was one of the genteelest men that ever lived.’

Parliament of Great Britain
Preceded by Lord Hervey; Sir Jermyn Davers, Bt	Member of Parliament for Bury St Edmunds; 1733–1747; With: Thomas Norton	Succeeded by Felton Hervey; Viscount Petersham
