= William Hervey (British Army officer) =

British general (1732–1815)

General The Honourable William Hervey
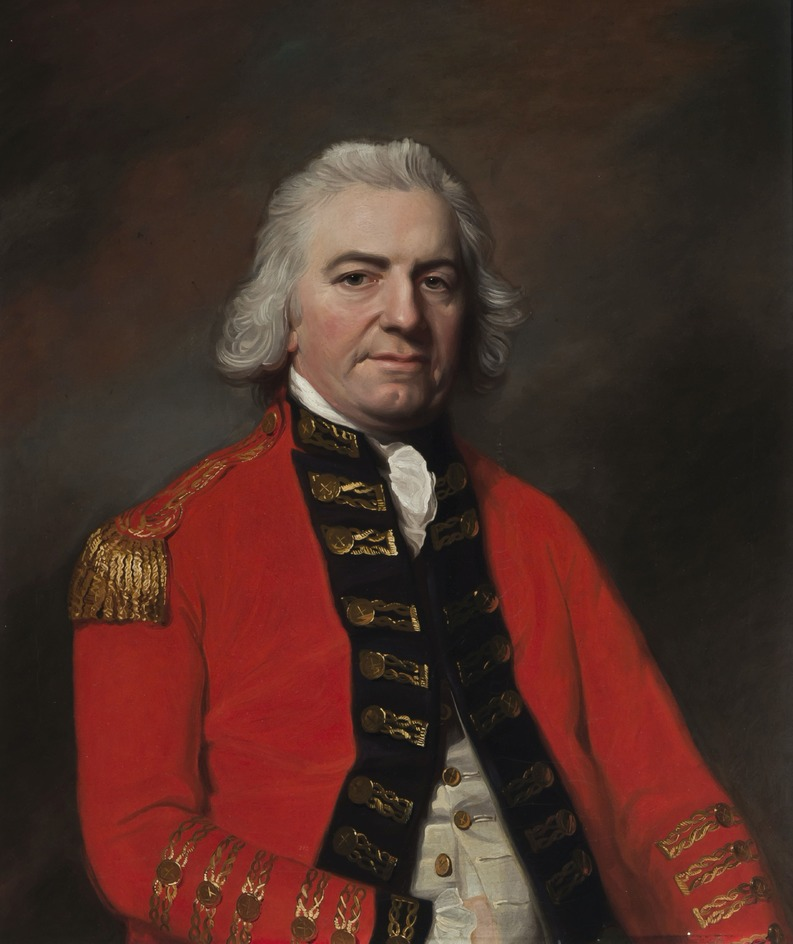
- Portrait by Lemuel Francis Abbott, c. 1797
- Born: 13 May 1732
- Died: 15 January 1815 (aged 82)
- Burial place: Ickworth House
- Alma mater: Westminster School; Corpus Christi College, Cambridge
- Military career
- Allegiance: United Kingdom
- Branch: British Army
- Service years: 1755–1815
- Rank: General
- Units: 44th Regiment of Foot; 1st Foot Guards
- Conflicts: Seven Years' War; Battle of Fort Niagara

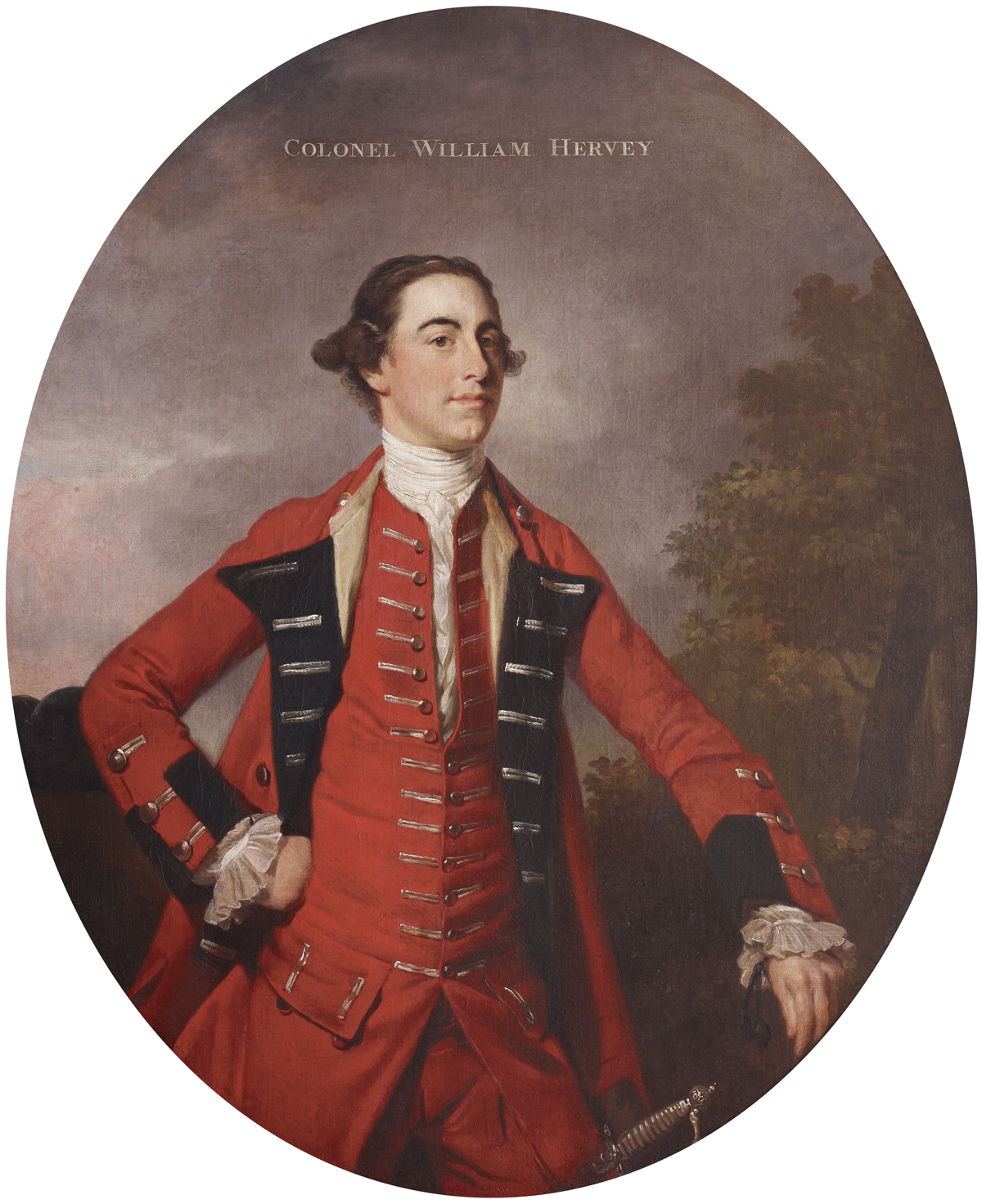
General William Hervey (1732–1815), attributed to Johann Zoffany in 1766

General William Hervey (13 May 1732 – 15 January 1815) was a British Army officer and, briefly, a politician.

== Life ==
Hervey was the son of Lord John Hervey and Mary Lepel. He was the younger brother of Augustus John Hervey (later the 3rd Earl of Bristol), and he was educated at Westminster School and at Corpus Christi College, Cambridge.

He joined the British Army in 1755 with the rank of lieutenant and he was posted to North America. He was there when the French were beaten at the Battle of Fort Niagara and Montreal. He was in Canada until 1763. He became a general in 1798.

While in America, he was elected in absentia at a by-election in 1763 as a member of parliament (MP) for Bury St Edmunds. He is not recorded as ever having spoken in the House of Commons and appears to have not have enjoyed his time there. He did not stand in the 1768 general election. There is a painting of him that is dated to 1766 that is attributed to Johann Zoffany. In September 1772, he was in Florence with his uncle, the Honourable Felton Hervey, and two of his children. His uncle was also being painted by Zoffany.

Hervey did not stand for parliament in 1768 although he did attempt to gain a seat in 1775 and 1780 in Bury St. Edmunds. His mother reported that he was a man with few pretensions and he would be as pleased to walk and eat plainly with water as he was to travel by coach and consume fine meats and wine. His diaries reveal him to be a keen traveller and a generous philanthropist. He gave his money to help the poor and debtors and to support schools. An 1803 diary entry records that he paid for locals to be inoculated using cow pox.

Hervey died in 1815 and was buried at Ickworth.

Parliament of Great Britain
Preceded by Hon. Augustus Hervey; Hon. Charles FitzRoy	Member of Parliament for Bury St Edmunds; 1763 – 1768; With: Hon. Charles FitzRoy	Succeeded by Hon. Charles FitzRoy; Hon. Augustus Hervey
