= 119th Regiment of Foot =

Two regiments of the British Army have been numbered the 119th Regiment of Foot:

- 119th (The Prince's Own) Regiment of Foot, raised in 1761
- 119th Regiment of Foot (1794), raised in 1794
