= General Stanhope (disambiguation) =

James Stanhope, 1st Earl Stanhope (c. 1673–1721) was a British Army general.

General Stanhope may also refer to:

- Charles Stanhope, 3rd Earl of Harrington (1753–1829), British Army general
- William Stanhope, 2nd Earl of Harrington (1719–1779), British Army general
