= 2nd Earl of Bristol =

2nd Earl of Bristol may refer to:

- George Digby, 2nd Earl of Bristol (1612–1677)
- George William Hervey, 2nd Earl of Bristol (1721–1775)

== See also ==
- Earl of Bristol
