= John Hervey, 1st Earl of Bristol =

English Whig politician and peer (1665–1751)

The Right Honourable The Earl of bristol
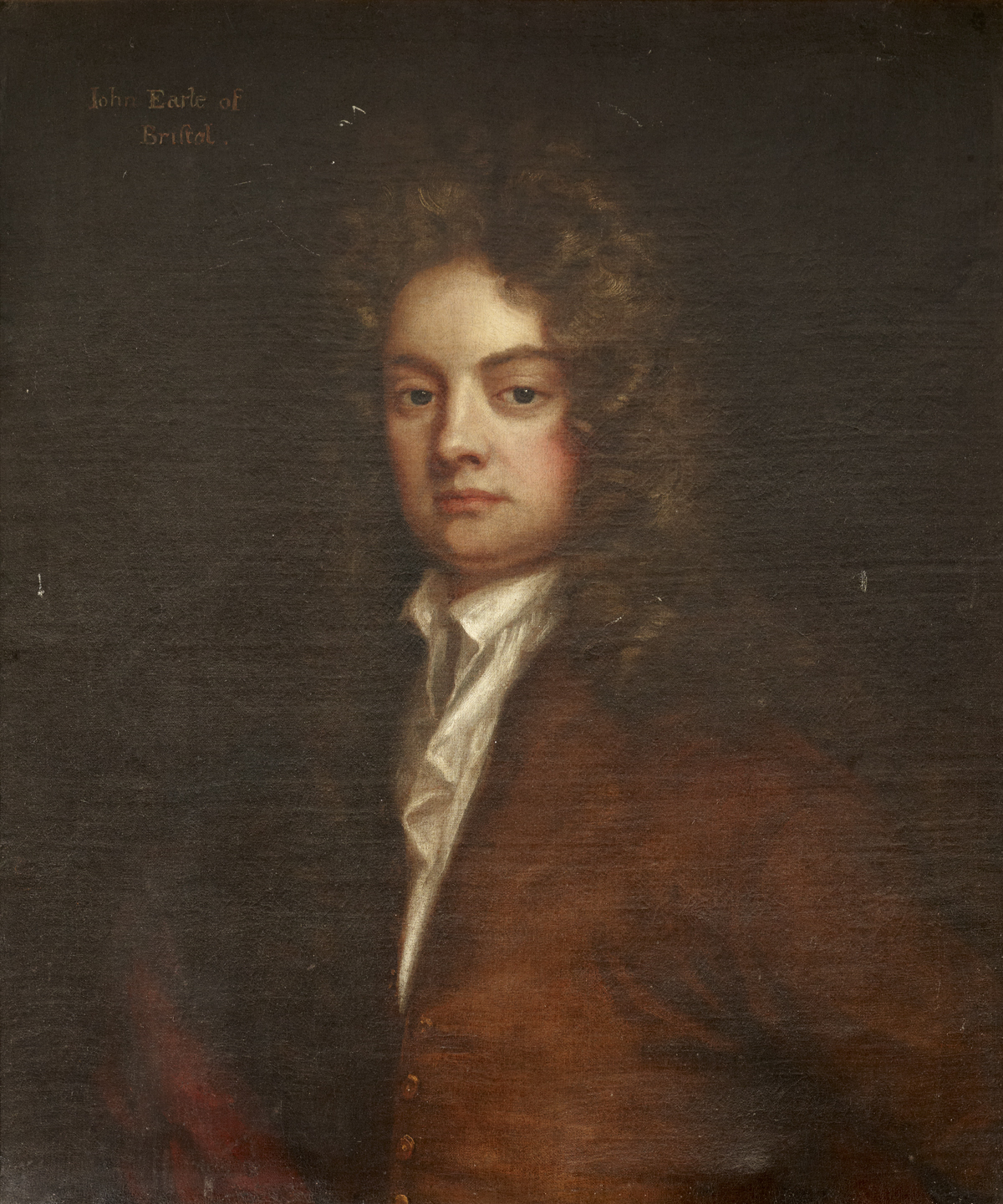
- Portrait of Hervey after Godfrey Kneller

Personal details
- Born: 27 August 1665 Bury St Edmunds, Suffolk
- Died: 20 January 1751 (aged 85) Ickworth House, Suffolk
- Parent(s): Sir Thomas Hervey; Isabella May

John Hervey, 1st Earl of Bristol (27 August 1665 – 20 January 1751) was an English Whig politician and peer.

== Early life ==
John Hervey was born in Bury St Edmunds, Suffolk, the son of Sir Thomas Hervey and Isabella, daughter of Sir Humphrey May. He was educated at Bury St Edmunds Grammar School and Clare College, Cambridge.

== Political career ==
Hervey first contested the Bury St Edmunds constituency in 1689, but was unsuccessful. He was, however, returned as one of two Members of Parliament for the seat at a by-election in 1694. He maintained good relations with his constituents and was returned at every subsequent general election with unanimous support.

Hervey was a Whig in his politics; he was quick to sign the Association of 1696 and on 25 November that year he voted in favour of the attainder of Sir John Fenwick, 3rd Baronet. In 1700, he was listed as being a supporter of the Whig Junto. On 21 May 1701 he spoke against a Tory proposal to reduce the civil list. At the November 1701 English general election, he successfully ousted the Tory Sir Robert Davers, 2nd Baronet from the second seat in Bury and had him replaced by the Whig Sir Thomas Felton, 4th Baronet. In the following parliament, he was listed by Robert Harley as being among the Whig parliamentarians. He found less favourable political circumstances following the accession of Anne in 1702, and applauded the May 1702 resignations of the Duke of Devonshire and the Earl of Carlisle.

Nonetheless, in early 1703, the Duchess of Marlborough successfully petitioned the queen to include Hervey among the new peers. On 27 March 1703 he was created 1st Baron Hervey, of Ickworth in the county of Suffolk and assumed his seat in the House of Lords. Hervey's elevation met considerable hostility from Tories including Sir John Leverson-Gower, one the Tory nominees.

Once a peer, Hervey took a more independent political line, but retained an affinity with Whig principles. In October 1714 was created Earl of Bristol as a reward for his zeal in promoting the principles of the revolution and supporting the Hanoverian succession. He became a critic of Court Whiggery under the Walpole ministry.

== Estates ==
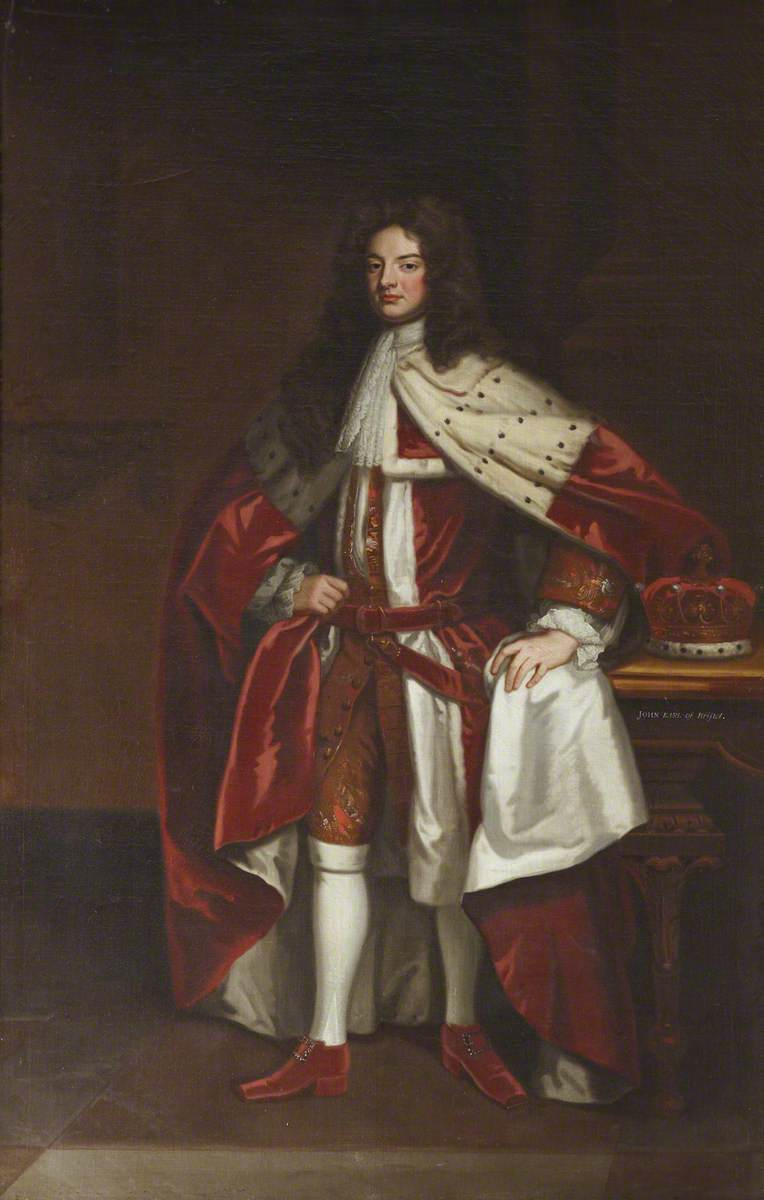
The Earl of Bristol in his robes as a peer (after Godfrey Kneller)

The principal estate owned by John Hervey was Ickworth House, which his ancestor Thomas Hervey (died 1467) acquired following his marriage to Jane Drury, the sole heiress to Henry Drury. He made Ickworth his primary residence in 1702. However, when he married Elizabeth Felton, he acquired property in other parts of Suffolk: Tuddenham, Playford and Shotley following the death of her father Sir Thomas Felton, 4th Baronet in 1709.

== Marriages and issue ==
Lord Bristol married twice:

- to Isabella (died 1693), daughter of Sir Robert Carr, 3rd Baronet, of Sleaford, Lincolnshire
- 25 July 1695, Boxted Hall in Suffolk, to Elizabeth (died 1741), daughter and co-heir of local Suffolk dignitary Sir Thomas Felton, 4th Baronet and his noble wife styled from birth Lady Elizabeth, daughter and co-heir of James Howard, 3rd Earl of Suffolk.

By his marriage to Isabella he had three children:

- Lady Isabella Hervey (died November 1711), unmarried
- Carr Hervey, Lord Hervey (1691–1723), who was educated at Clare College, Cambridge and was a Tory MP for the same seat as his father and grandfather from 1713 to 1722. He died unmarried on 14 November 1723.
- Catherine Hervey (b. 1693), died young

By his marriage to Lady Elizabeth he had seventeen children:

- John Hervey, 2nd Baron Hervey (1696–1743), was a politician, court wit and pamphleteer. On the death of his half-brother Carr in 1723 he took the courtesy title of Lord Hervey and gained some renown both as a writer and in politics. In 1733, he was summoned to the House of Lords through a writ of acceleration in his father's junior title of Baron Hervey. He also predeceased his father.
- Lady Elizabeth Hervey (1698–1727), married Bussy Mansel, without issue
- Thomas Hervey (20 January 1699 – 16 January 1775), was one of the members for Bury from 1733 to 1747; held various offices at court; and eloped with Elizabeth, wife of Sir Thomas Hanmer, 4th Baronet. He had very poor health, and his reckless life frequently brought him into pecuniary and other difficulties. He wrote numerous pamphlets, and when he died Dr. Johnson said of him, "Tom Hervey, though a vicious man [ie a man of vice], was one of the genteelest men who ever lived".

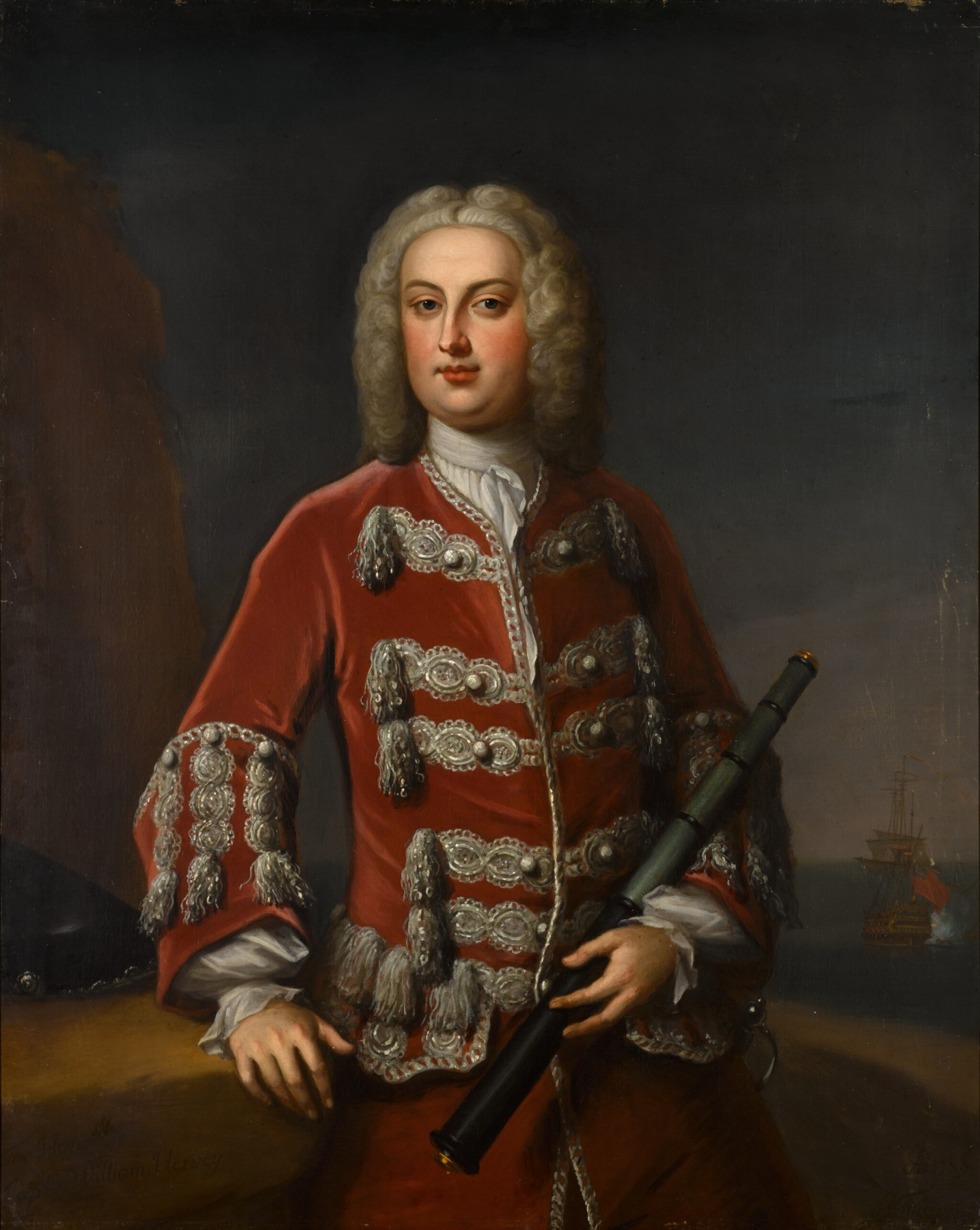
Portrait of Captain William Hervey by John Fayram

- Capt. William Hervey, RN (25 December 1699 – January 1776), married Elizabeth Ridge and had issue
- Rev. Henry Hervey (5 January 1701 – 16 November 1748); married Catherine Aston, assumed her surname, and had issue
- Rev. Charles Hervey (5 April 1703 – 21 March 1783), prebendary of Ely
- Lady Henrietta Hervey (5 April 1703 – April 1712)
- A stillborn son, 6 July 1704
- James Porter Hervey (24 June 1706 – August 1706)
- Lady Anne Hervey (c. 1707 – 15 July 1771)
- Lady Barbara Hervey (c. 1707 – 25 July 1727)
- Humphrey Hervey (b. 3 June 1708), died young
- Felton Hervey (3 July 1710 – 16 July 1710)
- Felton Hervey (1712–1773), was also Member of Parliament for the family borough of Bury St Edmunds. He appears in the foreground of Zoffany's "The Tribuna of the Uffizi." Having assumed the additional name of Bathurst, Felton's grandson, Felton Elwell Hervey-Bathurst (1782–1819), was created a baronet in 1818, and on his death a year later the title descended to his brother, Frederick Anne Hervey-Bathurst (1783–1824).
- James Hervey (5 March 1713 – May 1714)
- Lady Louisa Carolina Isabella Hervey (1715 – 11 May 1770), married Sir Robert Smyth, 2nd Baronet and had issue
- Lady Henrietta Hervey (25 September 1716 – July 1732)

When John Hervey, 1st Earl of Bristol, died in January 1751, the earldom of Bristol and the barony of Hervey, along with the estates of Ickworth House, passed to his grandson George, the eldest son of John, Lord Hervey.

Parliament of England
Preceded by Sir Robert Davers, Bt; Henry Goldwell	Member of Parliament for Bury St Edmunds; 1694–1703; With: Sir Robert Davers, Bt 1694–1701; Sir Thomas Felton 1701–03	Succeeded by Sir Robert Davers, Bt; Sir Thomas Felton
Peerage of Great Britain
New creation	Earl of Bristol; 1714–1751	Succeeded by George Hervey
Peerage of England
New creation	Baron Hervey (descended by acceleration); 1703–1733	Succeeded by John Hervey
