= Thomas Norton (died 1748) =

British landowner and Whig politician

Thomas Norton (1684–1748) of Ixworth Abbey, Bury St. Edmunds, Suffolk, was a British landowner and Whig politician who sat in the House of Commons from 1727 to 1747.

Norton was the son of Colonel William Norton of Wellow, Hampshire and his wife Elizabeth Norton, daughter of Sir Thomas Norton, 1st Baronet of Coventry. In 1696, he succeeded his father. He was educated at Bury Grammar School. In 1708, he succeeded his uncle Major Richard Norton to Ixworth Abbey. He joined the army and was captain and brevet-colonel in the 1st Foot Guards in 1710 and was on reserve in March 1714. He married Frances Felton, daughter of Sir Compton Felton, 5th Baronet MP of Playford Hall, Suffolk.

At the 1727 British general election, Norton was returned as Whig Member of Parliament for Bury St Edmunds on his own interest with the support of the 1st Earl of Bristol, with whom he was connected by marriage. He was appointed a governor of Chelsea Hospital in 1730 and held the position for the rest of his life. Walpole said of him in 1733 that he never swerved from his Whig principles, nor voted against the Administration. He was returned in 1734 and 1741 and continued to vote with the Government in all recorded divisions. He retired at the 1747 British general election.

Norton died without issue on 28 April 1748.

Parliament of Great Britain
Preceded by Lord Hervey; Sir Jermyn Davers, Bt	Member of Parliament for Bury St Edmunds; 1727–1747; With: Lord Hervey 1727-1733; Thomas Hervey 1733-1747	Succeeded by Felton Hervey; Viscount Petersham
