= Edward Rudge (politician) =

English politician

Edward Rudge (22 October 1703 – 6 June 1763), of Evesham Abbey, Worcestershire, was an English politician who sat in the House of Commons between 1728 and 1761.

== Early life ==
Rudge was the only son of John Rudge, MP of Mark Lane, London and Evesham Abbey, Worcestershire, and his wife Susanna Letten, daughter of John Letten of London. He was elected a Fellow of the Royal Society in 1726. He married Elizabeth Howard, the daughter and coheiress of Matthew Howard of Hackney, Middlesex on 8 April 1729.

== Career ==
Rudge was returned unopposed as Whig Member of Parliament (MP) for Aylesbury on the interest of his brother-in-law, Sir William Stanhope, at a by-election on 21 February 1728. He generally voted against the Government and did not stand at the 1734 general election. His father died in 1740 and he succeeded to his estate at Evesham. He was also returned unopposed as MP for Evesham, which was formerly his father's seat, at the 1741 general election. He was returned unopposed again at the 1747 general election.

In September 1753 Rudge was described as ‘one who though he had not much attended Parliament always voted with Government’. At the 1754 general election the Administration put up a candidate to oppose him. Rudge was defeated, although he was said to have spent ‘the greatest profusion of money’ in the contest. He was returned as MP for Evesham in a contest at a by-election on 23 April 1756. He did not stand at the 1761 general election.

Rudge died without issue on 6 June 1763.

Parliament of Great Britain
Preceded by Sir William Stanhope; Philip Lloyd	Member of Parliament for Aylesbury; 1728– 1734; With: Philip Lloyd 1728-1730; Thomas Ingoldsby 1730-1734	Succeeded by George Champion; Christopher Tower
Preceded by Sir John Rushout; William Taylor	Member of Parliament for Evesham; 1741–1754; With: Sir John Rushout	Succeeded by Sir John Rushout; John Porter
Preceded by Sir John Rushout; John Porter	Member of Parliament for Evesham; 1756–1762; With: Sir John Rushout	Succeeded by Sir John Rushout; John Rushout
