= Charles FitzRoy, 1st Baron Southampton =

British Army officer, politician and courtier (1737–1797)

The Right Honourable The Lord Southampton
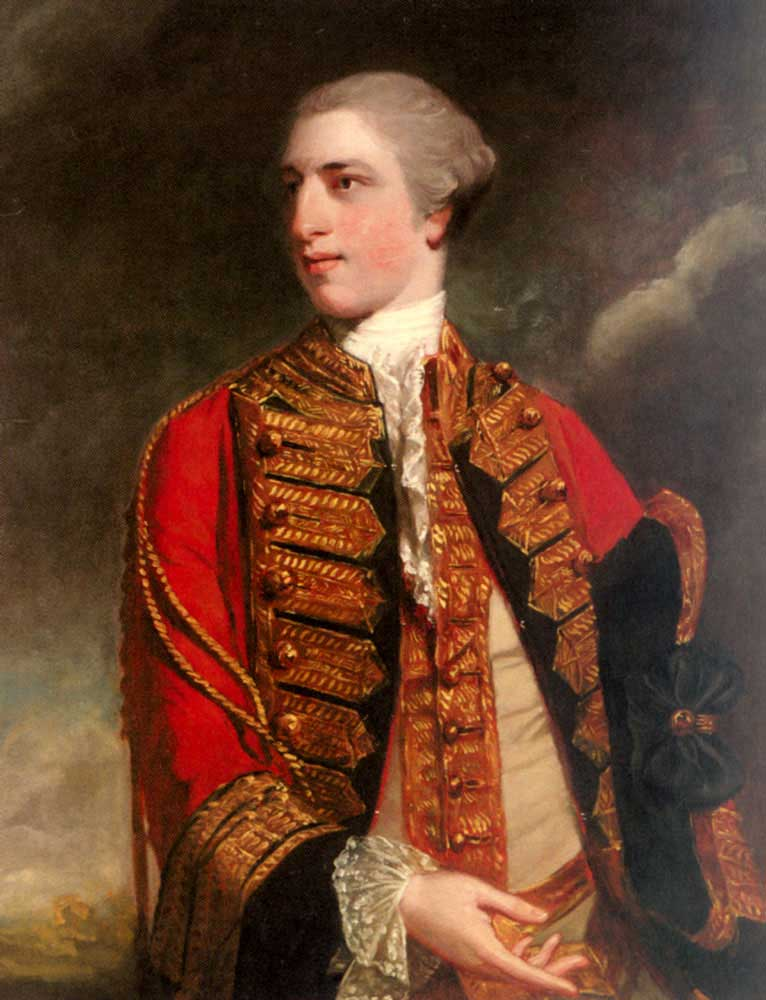
- Portrait by Sir Joshua Reynolds, c. 1760

Member of Parliament for Orford
- In office 1759–1761

Member of Parliament for Bury St Edmunds
- In office 1761–1774

Member of Parliament for Thetford
- In office 1774–1780

Personal details
- Born: 25 June 1737
- Died: 21 March 1797 (aged 59) Stanhope Street, London
- Resting place: St James's burial ground, Hampstead Road
- Party: Whig
- Spouse: Anne Warren
- Children: 16, including George FitzRoy, 2nd Baron Southampton and Charles FitzRoy
- Parents: Lord Augustus FitzRoy (father); Elizabeth Cosby (mother)
- Relatives: Augustus FitzRoy, 3rd Duke of Grafton (brother)

Military service
- Allegiance: Great Britain
- Branch/service: British Army
- Years of service: 1752–1797
- Rank: General
- Unit: 1st Regiment of Foot Guards
- Commands: 119th (The Prince's Own) Regiment of Foot; 14th Regiment of Dragoons; 3rd Regiment of Dragoons
- Battles/wars: Seven Years' War; Battle of Minden; Battle of Vellinghausen

General Charles FitzRoy, 1st Baron Southampton (25 June 1737 – 21 March 1797) was a British Army officer, politician and courtier who served in the Seven Years' War and sat in the House of Commons from 1759 to 1780. The second son of Lord Augustus FitzRoy, FitzRoy joined the 1st Regiment of Foot Guards as an ensign in 1752 and was promoted to lieutenant colonel in 1758. In the following year he fought at the Battle of Minden as an aide-de-camp, where he was a part of the controversy surrounding Lord George Sackville's slow reaction to orders sent to him. FitzRoy was also present at the Battle of Vellinghausen in 1761. Having been quickly promoted through the ranks with the support of his powerful family, he was promoted to major general in 1772 and became a full general in 1793.

With the patronage of his elder brother Augustus FitzRoy, 3rd Duke of Grafton, FitzRoy also had a long political career. He was a Groom of the Bedchamber from 1760 to 1762 and Whig Member of Parliament for Orford from 1759 to 1761, for Bury St Edmunds from 1761 to 1774 and for Thetford from 1774 to 1780. He was created Baron Southampton on 17 October 1780 for his support of Lord North's ministry and became Groom of the Stole to the Prince of Wales later in the year, a position he would hold for the rest of his life. He was succeeded by his eldest son, George, upon his death in 1797.

== Life ==
=== Early military service ===
Charles FitzRoy was born on 25 June 1737, the second son of Lord Augustus FitzRoy and Elizabeth née Cosby, who was the daughter of Colonel William Cosby. Descended from the aristocratic FitzRoy family, FitzRoy's older brother Augustus would go on to become the third Duke of Grafton. When FitzRoy's father died of a fever while serving at the Battle of Cartagena de Indias in 1741, the brothers were given over to the care of their grandfather, Charles FitzRoy, 2nd Duke of Grafton. In 1752 FitzRoy joined the British Army as an ensign in the 1st Regiment of Foot Guards. With the backing of his powerful family, FitzRoy was promoted quickly. He became lieutenant (regimental rank) and captain (army rank) in 1756, (Note: In this period officers of the Foot Guards held two ranks. Buying a commission in these regiments cost more than it would have in other regiments, and so if an officer in the Foot Guards transferred in his rank to a different regiment he would lose money. To counter this Foot Guards officers held both a regimental rank and an army rank; if they transferred to a regiment outside of the Foot Guards then they would hold their higher, army, rank and would therefore not lose money.) and captain and lieutenant colonel in 1758. In the following year he became aide-de-camp to Field Marshal Prince Ferdinand of Brunswick for service in the Seven Years' War.

With Ferdinand, FitzRoy was present at the Battle of Minden on 1 August, described by the historian Piers Mackesy as "an excited and breathless youth of twenty-two". Towards the end of the battle FitzRoy was tasked with giving an order from Ferdinand to the commander of the British contingent of the army, Lieutenant-general Lord George Sackville, that would have seen the British cavalry make a decisive charge. Sackville was unusually slow in understanding and responding to the order, and argued with FitzRoy over what he was meant to be doing before halting the cavalry and riding away to speak with Ferdinand. A court martial was held over the incident by the request of Sackville who wanted to clear his name. FitzRoy gave evidence during the event, the result of which was Sackville's disgrace in March 1760. Sackville's attempts to defend himself included the publication of An Answer to Colonel FitzRoy, in which he replied to FitzRoy's testimonies.

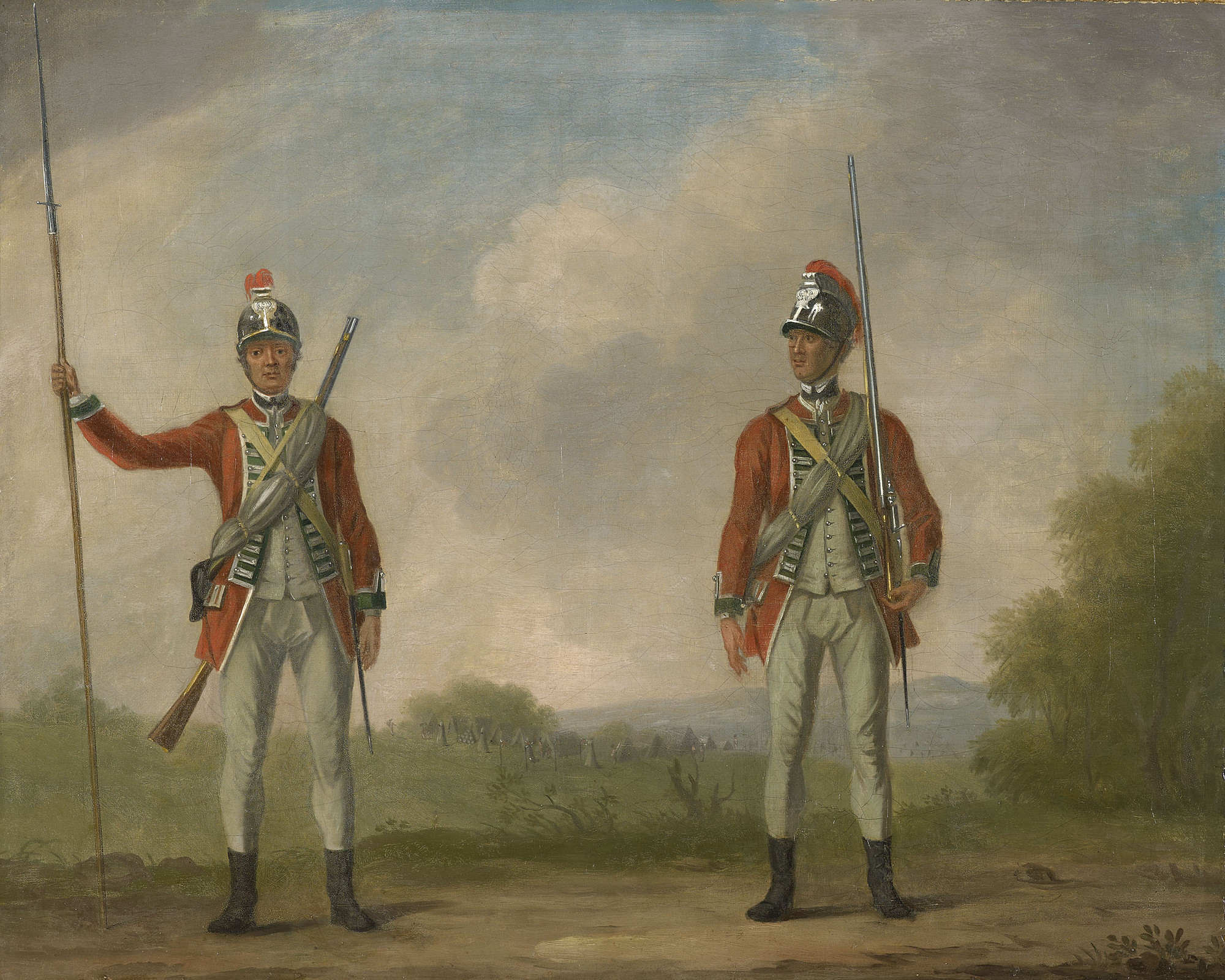
Two privates of the 119th Foot, which FitzRoy commanded as colonel

FitzRoy was named by Ferdinand after the battle as one of those "whose behaviour he especially admired". In the same year he was appointed a Groom of the Bedchamber. He continued to serve in the army during this time, fighting at the Battle of Vellinghausen on 15 July 1761. Returning to England in 1762, FitzRoy was promoted to colonel, commanding the 119th (The Prince's Own) Regiment of Foot, which was disbanded in 1763.

=== Political career ===
Like his brother Grafton, an established politician, FitzRoy was a Whig, part of a political faction that was often brought together more by kinship than by shared ideology. While serving in the Seven Years' War, he was elected as a member of parliament (MP) for the constituency of Orford in August 1759. The election was organised by the prime minister Lord Newcastle, who in December also provided a secret-service pension for FitzRoy. (Note: Secret-service pensions were a form of bribery available to politicians in this period. The historian Sir Lewis Namier describes them as an "ill-famed, subterranean stream of corruption" that was "the last resort of political beggars in distress, and of Opposition leaders in search of a topic".) Still serving in Germany, FitzRoy did not actively enter politics but was elected as MP for Bury St Edmunds in 1761. Having returned to England in 1762, he began to play a part in politics.

While initially FitzRoy followed the political leads of Newcastle and Grafton, in May Newcastle was dismissed as prime minister and FitzRoy refused to support him in opposition. Despite this FitzRoy still voted against the new prime minister, Lord Bute, on the peace preliminaries in December that were to end the Seven Years' War. For this Bute had FitzRoy removed from his position as Groom of the Bedchamber.

Despite his earlier break with Newcastle, FitzRoy continued to work with Grafton. He spoke in Parliament against the 1765 Regency Bill in April of the year, and in May worked as an intermediary between Grafton and fellow Whig William Pitt in the organisation of Lord Rockingham's term as prime minister. With Rockingham coming into power, Grafton was made Secretary of State for the Northern Department and FitzRoy found new favour in his military career. He was made colonel of the 14th Regiment of Dragoons on 11 September of the same year because of this, and began serving as Vice-Chamberlain to Queen Charlotte in 1768. Grafton then became prime minister, a position he would hold until 1770. Towards the end of 1769 FitzRoy fell out with Grafton again, as a result of which he refused an appointment as Vice-Chamberlain of the Household in 1770.

=== Baron Southampton ===
FitzRoy was promoted to major general in 1772, and on 20 October transferred his colonelcy from the 14th Regiment of Dragoons to the 3rd Regiment of Dragoons. He moved as an MP from Bury St Edmunds to Thetford in 1774, at which point he began to operate more independently in politics. When Grafton moved to the opposition in October 1775 due to Prime Minister Lord North's aggressive policies towards Patriots in the Thirteen Colonies, FitzRoy again refused to join him. He was promoted to lieutenant-general on 29 August 1777. As a reward for his support of North's policies FitzRoy was created Baron Southampton on 17 October 1780.

In December 1780 FitzRoy was appointed Groom of the Stole to the Prince of Wales. (Note: FitzRoy resigned as Groom of the Stole in July 1786 but was reinstated on 23 May 1787.) In this role he was a special advisor and head of household to Wales. FitzRoy acted as an intermediary between the prince and his father George III during the disagreements surrounding the prince's secret marriage to Maria Fitzherbert. He was also heavily involved in the troubles, and attempted solutions, surrounding the prince's very large debts, much of which came from the construction of Carlton House. One contemporary said of FitzRoy that he "had only one fault, to be dislik'd by [the Prince of Wales] and a blind attachment to the king".

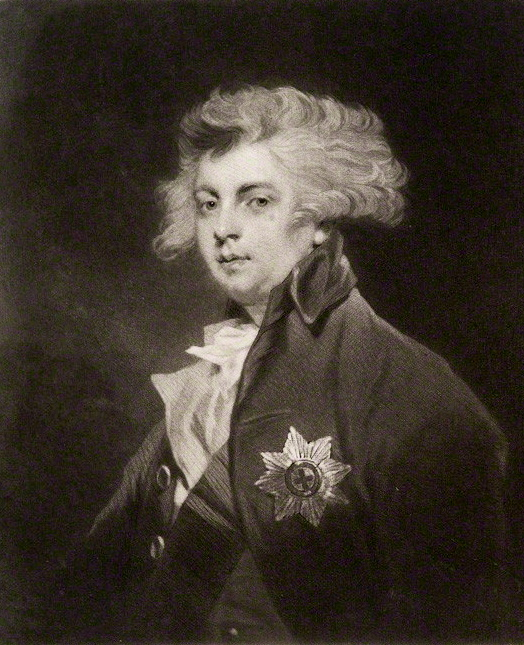
The Prince of Wales, future George IV, who FitzRoy served as Groom of the Stole

Now serving in the House of Lords, FitzRoy created the motion for the loyal address to the king at the opening of parliament in 1781, and in 1782 returned to his military roots when Sackville, now known as Germain, was created Viscount Sackville. This was not a popular decision, and on 18 February Lord Carmarthen moved to protest against it, arguing that Germain's court martialling should disqualify him from becoming a peer. In the subsequent debate Germain argued that his court martial had been politically motivated, but FitzRoy intervened to disagree, saying that it had not been "animated by a factious spirit". Carmarthen made two attempts to stop Sackville being accepted into the Lords but failed in both.

In the same year FitzRoy's role in the court of Queen Charlotte came to an end. Continuing on in the Lords after this, FitzRoy stayed neutral in the debates over the 1789 Regency Bill, speaking on it on 16 February of that year. He was promoted to general on 25 October 1793 and died at his home in Stanhope Street, London, on 21 March 1797. He was buried in St James's burial ground, Hampstead Road, on 30 March.

== Family ==
FitzRoy married Anne Warren (died 13 July 1807), the daughter and co-heir of Vice-Admiral Sir Peter Warren, on 27 July 1758. Together the couple and their family lived at FitzRoy Farm near Highgate, which was part of the FitzRoy-owned Tottenham Court. (Note: FitzRoy owned several pieces of land within London. He employed architect Robert Adam to develop one of them into Fitzroy Square.) FitzRoy's children included:

- Anne Caroline FitzRoy (born 9 May 1759), died an infant.
- Susannah Maria FitzRoy (7 September 1760 – 27 January 1795)
- George FitzRoy, 2nd Baron Southampton (7 August 1761 – 24 June 1810)
- General Charles FitzRoy (5 September 1762 – 18 October 1831), incorrectly assumed to be an illegitimate child of George III. Maybe his son-in-law (in an illegal marriage, for Royal Marriages Act 1772, with the King's daughter, Princess Amelia)
- William FitzRoy (21 July 1764 – 28 August 1786)
- Henry FitzRoy (13 September 1765 – 19 March 1794), married Lady Anne Wesley.
- Charlotte FitzRoy (born 13 July 1767), married Arthur Hill-Trevor, 2nd Viscount Dungannon.
- Warren FitzRoy (1 September 1768 – 24 May 1806)
- Frederic FitzRoy (born 10 October 1769)
- Emily FitzRoy (26 December 1770 – 1800), married William Bagot, 2nd Baron Bagot.
- Louisa FitzRoy (born 12 December 1771), married James Allen of Bromsgrove.
- Lieutenant-general William FitzRoy (12 December 1773 – 19 June 1837), married daughter of Sir Simon Clarke, 7th Baronet.
- Robert FitzRoy (27 May 1775 – before 1812)
- Edward Somerset FitzRoy (25 October 1776 – before 1812)
- Unnamed son (born July 1778), died an infant.
- Unnamed son (born November 1779), died an infant.
- Georgiana FitzRoy (13 October 1782 – 6 February 1835), married William Ponsonby.

== Notes and citations ==
=== Citations ===
Parliament of Great Britain
Preceded by Viscount Chewton; Henry Bilson Legge	Member of Parliament for Orford; 1759–1761; With: John Offley	Succeeded by John Offley; Thomas Worsley
Preceded by Felton Hervey; Lord Hervey	Member of Parliament for Bury St Edmunds; 1761–1774; With: Lord Hervey to 1763; William Hervey 1763–68; Lord Hervey from 1768	Succeeded by Lord Hervey; Sir Charles Davers
Preceded by Henry Seymour Conway; Viscount Petersham	Member of Parliament for Thetford; 1774–1780; With: Charles FitzRoy-Scudamore	Succeeded by Charles FitzRoy-Scudamore; Richard Hopkins
Military offices
Preceded by New regiment	Colonel of the 119th (The Prince's Own) Regiment of Foot; 1762–1763	Succeeded by Regiment disbanded
Preceded by Marquess of Lorne	Colonel of the 14th Regiment of Dragoons; 1765–1772	Succeeded by Daniel Webb
Preceded by Earl of Albemarle	Colonel of the 3rd Regiment of Dragoons; 1772–1797	Succeeded by Francis Lascelles
Political offices
Preceded by Robert Brudenell	Vice Chamberlain to Queen Charlotte; 1768–1782	Succeeded by Stephen Digby
Preceded by Position established	Groom of the Stole to the Prince of Wales; 1780–1797	Succeeded by ?
Peerage of Great Britain
New creation	Baron Southampton; 1780–1797	Succeeded by George FitzRoy
