= Thomas Ingoldsby (politician) =

English politician

Thomas Ingoldsby (3 March 1689 – 1768), of Waldridge, near Aylesbury, Buckinghamshire, was an English politician who served in the House of Commons from 1730 to 1734.

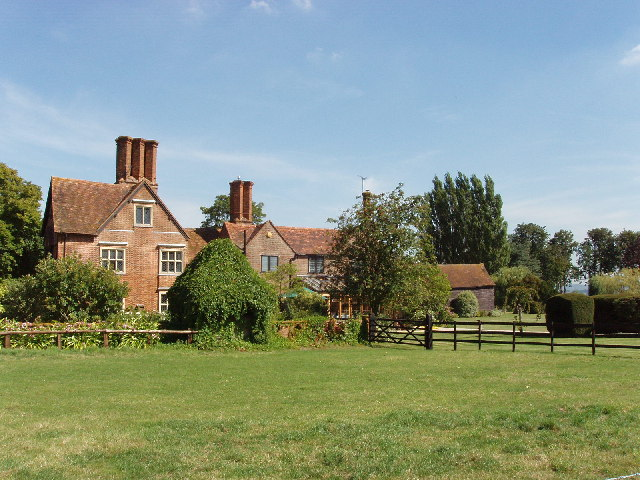
Waldridge Manor

Ingoldsby was the eldest surviving son of Richard Ingoldsby of Waldridge and Mary Colmore, daughter of William Colmore of Warwick. Upon his father’s death in 1703, he inherited the family estate. He was likely educated at Winchester College in 1704 and matriculated at St. John's College, Oxford, on 19 September 1706, at the age of 16. He later married Anne Limbrey, the daughter of John Limbrey of Tangier Park, Hampshire.

Ingoldsby entered Parliament as the Member of Parliament (MP) for Aylesbury after a contested by-election on 13 February 1730, defeating the sitting member, a follower of Robert Walpole. During his time in Parliament, he supported the Government, voting in favor of the Excise Bill in 1733 and the repeal of the Septennial Act in 1734. Although he backed administration candidates in Buckinghamshire for the 1734 general election, he did not stand himself.

Ingoldsby died in late 1768, leaving one surviving daughter.

Parliament of Great Britain
Preceded by Edward Rudge; Philip Lloyd	Member of Parliament for Aylesbury; 1730–1734; With: Edward Rudge	Succeeded by George Champion; Christopher Tower
