= George Champion (politician) =

English merchant and politician

Sir George Champion (1713–1754) of St Clement's Lane, London, and Baulking, Berkshire (now Oxfordshire), was an English merchant and politician who sat in the House of Commons from 1734 to 1741. He was notably passed over for the role of Lord Mayor of London.

== Early life ==
Although born in London, George Champion descended from the Champion family of Baulking, near Uffington, Berkshire. He was baptised on 29 November 1713 at St Bride's, Fleet Street, London, the son of George Champion (born 1687) of Uffington, Berkshire and his wife Catherine Bould. He was the cousin of the London-based merchant Alexander Champion. He married Susanna Andrews, daughter of Sir Jonathan Andrews of Kempton Park, Middlesex. She died on 3 September 1738.

== Career ==
Champion became a London merchant and was a Common Councillor for Langbourn ward from 1726 to 1729. In 1729 he became a freeman of the Coopers’ Company and was chosen as alderman for Bridge ward on 26 December 1729. He served on committees set up by the common council of the city to raise petitions against legislation on the Charitable Corporation, and the excise bill, and was so effective that he became ‘the darling of the city’. At the 1734 British general election, he was returned as Member of Parliament (MP) for Aylesbury. He was knighted on 18 January 1737, and served as Sheriff of London for the year 1737 to 1738. In Parliament he was the only London alderman to vote for the Spanish convention. A Treasury order of 25 April 1738 was issued to the commissioners of customs to stay proceedings against him for unpaid duties until further orders. This may have been an incentive to win his vote for the Convention and the City figures were unimpressed. As the senior alderman below the chair, Champion would have expected to be chosen as Lord Mayor of London under the strict rotation that had prevailed for the previous 30 years. He translated to Haberdasher's Company on 18 September 1739 under the tradition that Lord Mayors were members of the oldest 12 livery companies. However, when he stood for the office of lord mayor, he was defeated on a show of hands by a great majority. Nonetheless he was Master of the Haberdashers’ for the year 1740 to 1741. In Parliament, he voted with the Administration for the place bill in 1740. He did not stand at the 1741 British general election.

== Later life and legacy ==
Champion made a second marriage on 27 February 1744, to Mrs Jones, a widow of Moulsford, Berkshire. In 1745 he became colonel the White Regiment of the City of London trained bands. He became President of the Honourable Artillery Company in 1750. He died on 18 July 1754, leaving a daughter by his first wife. A son by his second wife predeceased him.

Parliament of Great Britain
Preceded by Edward Rudge; Thomas Ingoldsby	Member of Parliament for Aylesbury; 1734–1741; With: Christopher Tower	Succeeded by Charles Pilsworth; Viscount Petersham
