= Felton Hervey =

English politician (1712–1773)

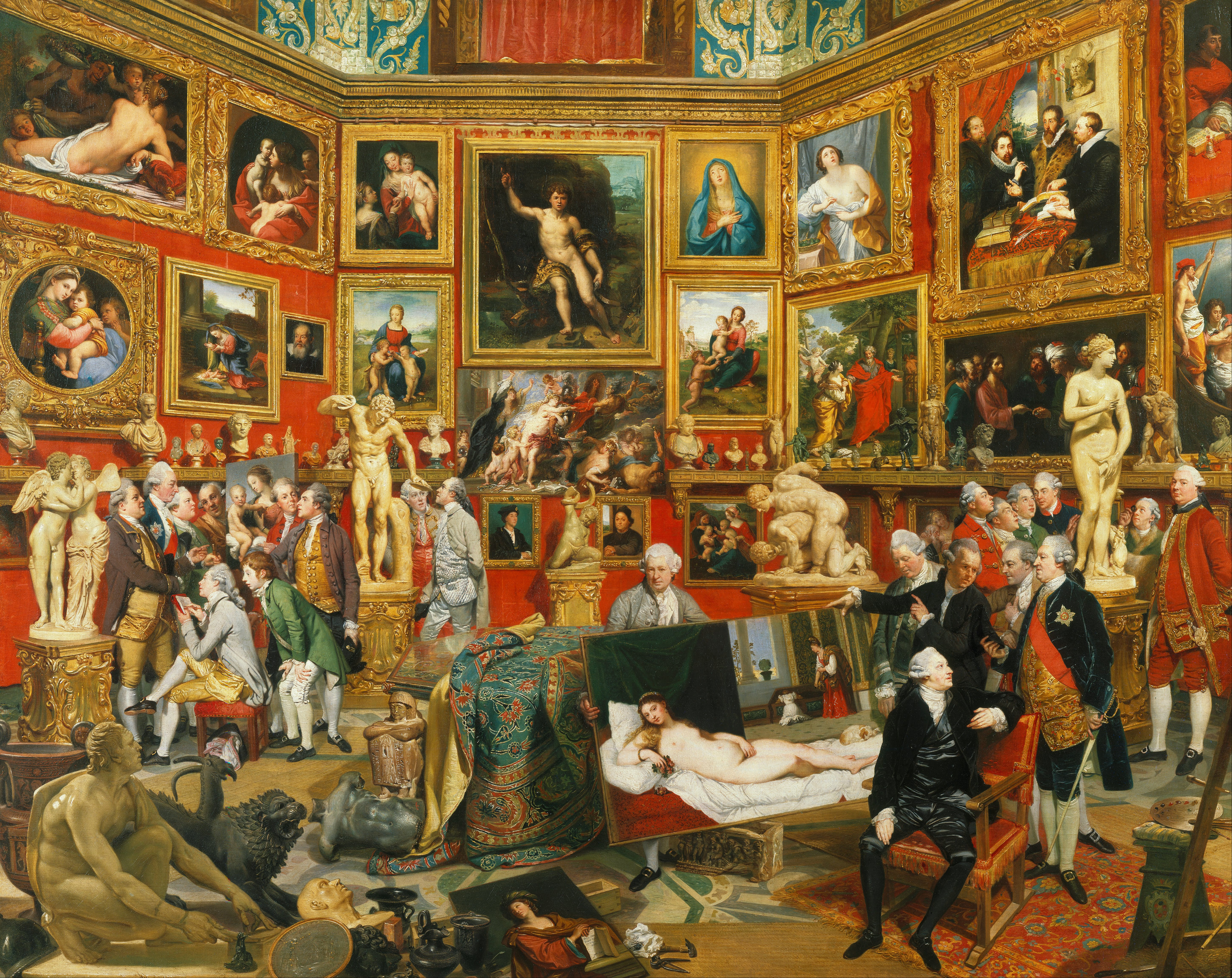
The Tribuna of the Uffizi

Felton Hervey (12 February 1712 – 16 August 1773) was an aristocratic English politician from Bury St Edmunds in Suffolk, and a member of the British royal household. He took his son and daughter on a grand tour of Italy where he met Johann Zoffany and Pope Clement XIV.

== Life ==
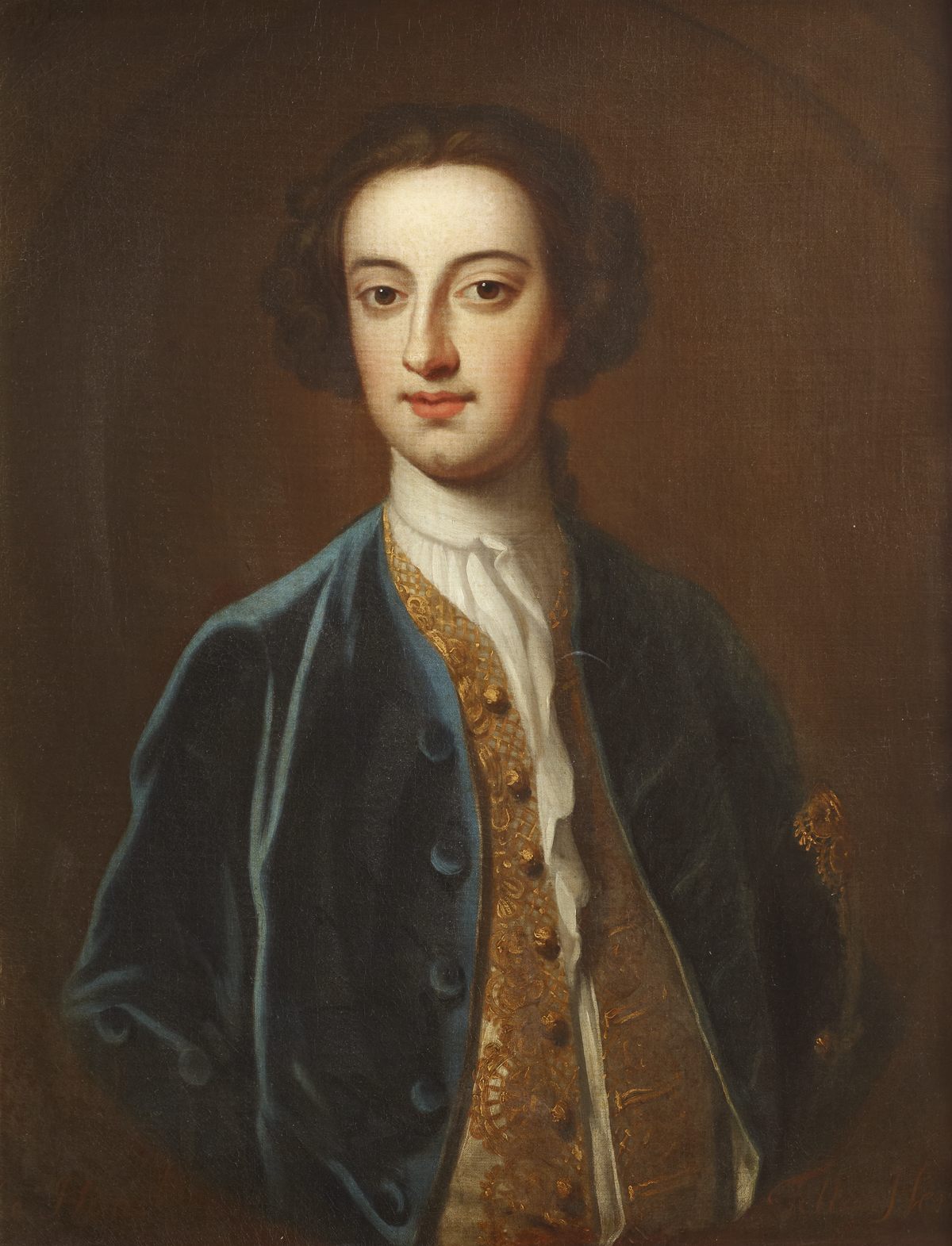
The Honourable Felton Hervey by John Fayram

Hervey was born in 1712; he was the tenth son (and seventeenth child) of John Hervey, 1st Earl of Bristol. His mother, Elizabeth Felton, was the daughter and heir of Sir Thomas Felton, 4th Baronet, who, like her husband, was also an MP for the family seat of Bury St Edmunds. He was the second child to be called Felton, as an elder brother who had lived only a few weeks had been given that name. His elder brother's brief life and death are recorded in a naive painting conserved in the Rotunda, Ickworth House, that is possibly by Joseph Brooke.

He was educated at Bury St Edmunds Grammar School and later expelled from Eton College.

Hervey was Queen Caroline's equerry in 1736–7, but he was dismissed for misconduct. However, from 1737 to 1756 he was the groom of the bedchamber to her seventh child, Prince William, Duke of Cumberland. In 1754 Hervey stood for the House of Commons against the naval officer Augustus Hervey to whom he was related having quarrelled with Lord Bristol. He became one of the members of parliament (MP) for Bury St Edmunds in Suffolk. Hervey said that he was expecting a position by the then Whig Prime Minister Henry Pelham, but he eventually gave up hope despite Pelham's reassurances. In 1756 Hervey resigned his position with the Duke of Cumberland citing the problems of travelling several times a year. (In 1757 his nephew Augustus Hervey was narrowly elected for Bury St Edmunds by one vote despite still being in active command of a ship in the Mediterranean.)

Hervey was successful in being appointed to the sinecure post of Remembrancer to the Exchequer. He shared this post unusually with his son, who continued with the post after his father's death.

In September 1772 Hervey was in Florence with his nephew Colonel William Hervey and two of his children. Hervey was portrayed among the virtuosi in the foreground of Johann Zoffany's painting Tribuna of the Uffizi. Zoffany's painting was not complete until after Hervey's death but he is the figure in the foreground surrounded by the British Consul, the artist Thomas Patch and other members of the British set in Italy. Hervey had an audience with the Pope in 1773 and died shortly after returning from Italy. He never saw the completed Zoffany painting, as it was not finished until 1777.

== Family ==
Hervey had married Dorothy, daughter of Solomon Ashley, of Westminster. MP and widow of Charles Pitfield of Hoxley on 25 December 1740, and together they had a son and three (or four) daughters.

- Amelia Hervey (b. 3 January 1742), was baptised at St James's Church, Piccadilly.
- Caroline Hervey (b. 29 March 1745), was baptised at St James's Church, Piccadilly.
- Elizabeth Hervey.
- Felton Lionel Hervey (b. 21 May 1751), was baptised at St James's Church, Piccadilly.
- Isabella Hervey (b. 16 August 1756), was baptised at St James's Church, Piccadilly.

== Legacy ==
Beside the Zoffany painting there is also a much younger and larger portrait by John Fayram in the Ickworth Rotunda, and the National Trust own a miniature of him by Christian Friedrich Zincke, which dates from about 1730.

In 1775 an auction was organised by Christie's at his former home in Bury St Edmunds of his considerable art collection. Hervey's son Lieutenant Felton Lionel Hervey, who had worked for the exchequer with him, was left the manor in Bury St Edmunds. His son later committed suicide in a London gunsmiths.

Parliament of Great Britain
Preceded by Thomas Hervey; Thomas Norton	Member of Parliament for Bury St Edmunds; 1747–1761; With: Viscount Petersham 1747–56; Earl of Euston 1756–57; Hon. Augustus Hervey from 1758	Succeeded by Hon. Charles FitzRoy; Hon. Augustus Hervey
Preceded by Samuel Masham, 2nd Baron Masham	King's Remembrancer with his son 1776–1773	Succeeded by Edward James Eliot
