= Charles Pilsworth =

18th-century British politician

Charles Pilsworth (died 1749) was a British politician. He was Member of Parliament for Aylesbury from 1741 to 1747.

== Personal background ==
Pilsworth married Parnell Tyringham and resided in the manor of Lower Winchendon, which she held as co-heiress, along with her sister Mary, at the time of the 1735 death of her brother Lord Francis Tyrington.

Parliament of Great Britain
Preceded by George Champion; Christopher Tower	Member of Parliament for Aylesbury; 1741–1747; With: Viscount Petersham	Succeeded by Edward Willes; The Earl of Inchiquin
