= John Hervey, 2nd Baron Hervey =

English courtier and political writer (1696-1743)

The Right Honourable The Lord Hervey PC
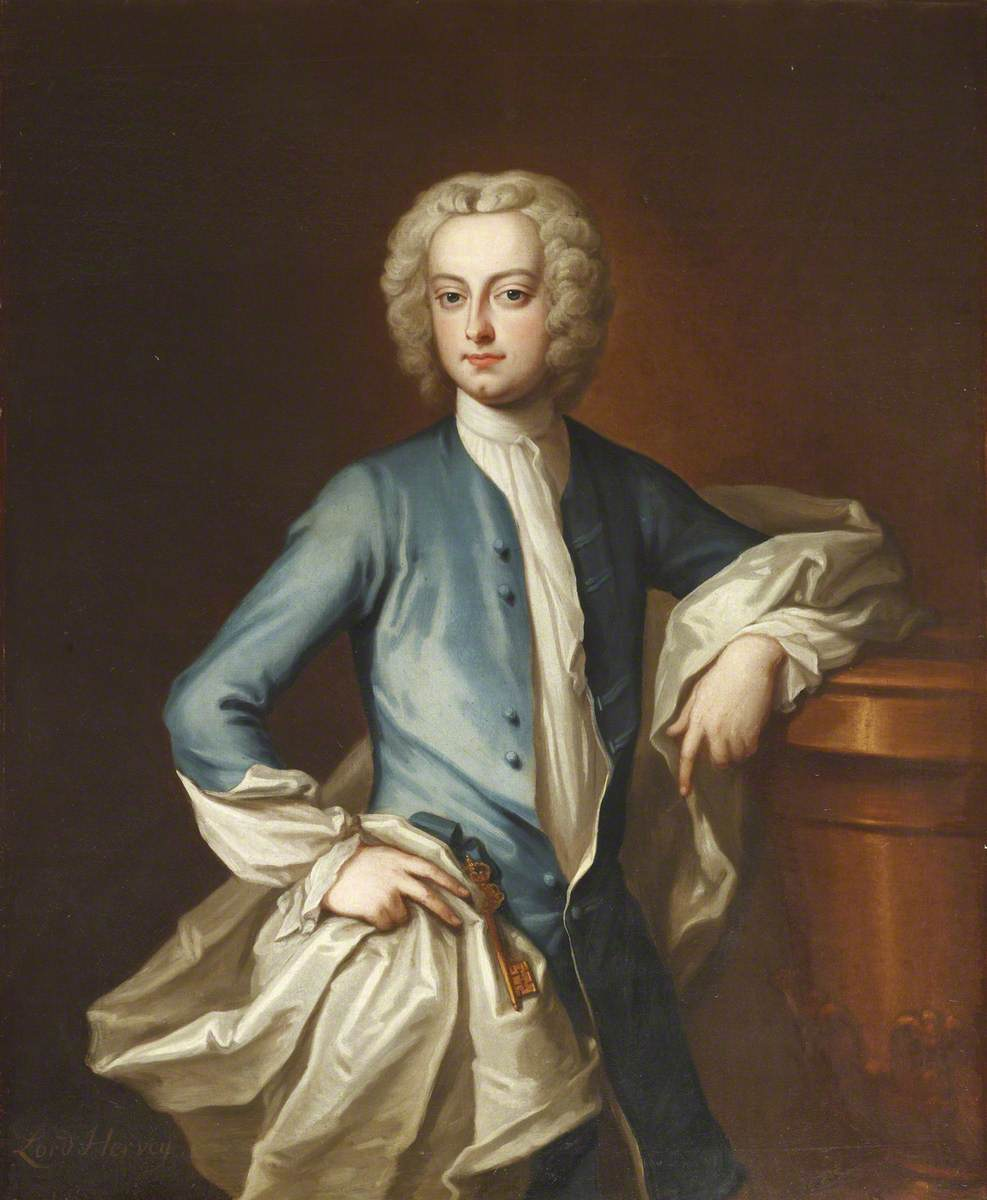
- Portrait by John Fayram, c. 1737

Lord Privy Seal
- In office 7 April 1740 – 13 July 1742
- Monarch: George II
- Prime Minister: Robert Walpole
- Preceded by: The Earl of Godolphin
- Succeeded by: The Earl Gower

Personal details
- Born: 13 October 1696
- Died: 5 August 1743 (aged 46)
- Spouse: Mary Lepell
- Children: 8, including George, Augustus and Frederick
- Parent(s): John Hervey, 1st Earl of Bristol; Elizabeth Felton

John Hervey, 2nd Baron Hervey, PC (13 October 1696 – 5 August 1743) was an English courtier and political writer. Heir to the Earl of Bristol, he obtained the key patronage of Walpole, and was involved in many court intrigues and literary quarrels, being apparently caricatured by Pope and Fielding. His memoirs of the early reign of George II were too revealing to be published in his time and did not appear for more than a century.

== Family background ==
Hervey was the eldest son of John Hervey, 1st Earl of Bristol, by his second wife, Elizabeth Hervey, Countess of Bristol. He was known as Lord Hervey from 1723, upon the death of his elder half-brother, Carr, the only son of his father's first wife, Isabella, but Lord Hervey never became Earl of Bristol, as he predeceased his father.

== Life ==
Hervey was educated at Westminster School and at Clare College, Cambridge, where he took his M.A. degree in 1715. His father then sent him to Paris in 1716, and thence to Hanover to pay court to George I.

He was a frequent visitor at the court of the Prince and Princess of Wales at Richmond, and in 1720 he married Mary Lepell, daughter of Nicholas Lepell, who was one of the Princess's ladies-in-waiting, and a great court beauty. In 1723 John's elder half-brother Carr died, whereby he became heir apparent to the Earldom of Bristol with the courtesy title of Lord Hervey. In 1725 he was elected M.P. for Bury St Edmunds.

Hervey had been at one time on very friendly terms with Frederick, Prince of Wales, but in about 1732 they quarrelled, apparently because they were rivals for the affection of Anne Vane. These differences probably account for the scathing picture he draws of the Prince's callous conduct. Hervey had been hesitating between William Pulteney (afterwards earl of Bath) and Robert Walpole, but in 1730 he definitely took sides with Walpole, of whom he was thenceforward a faithful adherent. He was assumed by Pulteney to be the author of Sedition and Defamation display'd, with a Dedication to the patrons of The Craftsman (1731). Pulteney, who, up to this time, had been a firm friend of Hervey, replied with A Proper Reply to a late Scurrilous Libel, and the quarrel resulted in a duel from which Hervey narrowly escaped with his life.

Hervey is said to have denied the authorship of both the pamphlet and its dedication, but a note on the manuscript at Ickworth, apparently in his own hand, states that he wrote the latter. He was able to render valuable service to Walpole from his influence with the Queen. Through him the minister governed Queen Caroline and indirectly George II. Hervey was vice-chamberlain in the royal household and a member of the Privy Council. In 1733 he was called to the House of Lords by writ of acceleration in his father's Barony. He was then elected a governor of the Foundling Hospital prior to its foundation in 1739. In spite of repeated requests he received no further preferment until after 1740, when he became Lord Privy Seal.

After the fall of Sir Robert Walpole, he was dismissed (July 1742) from his office. A political pamphlet, Miscellaneous Thoughts on the present Posture of Foreign and Domestic Affairs, shows that he still retained his mental vigour, but he was liable to epilepsy, and his weak appearance and rigid diet were a constant source of ridicule for his enemies. He predeceased his father, but three of his sons became successively Earls of Bristol.

== Memoirs and literary quarrels ==
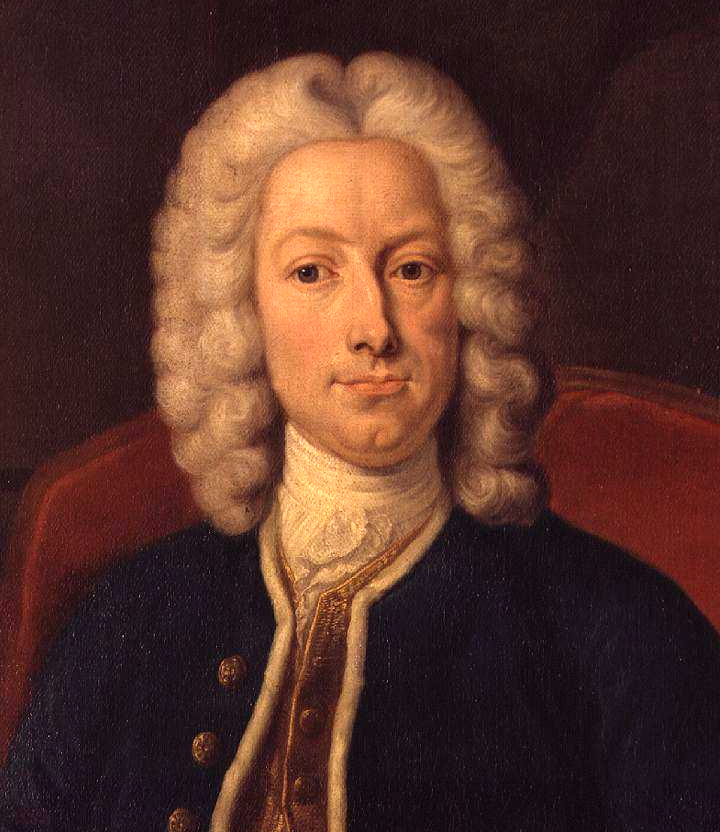
John Hervey, 2nd Baron Hervey

Hervey wrote detailed and brutally frank memoirs of the court of George II of Great Britain from 1727 to 1737. He gave a most unflattering account of the King, and of Frederick, Prince of Wales, and their family squabbles. For the Queen Caroline of Ansbach and her daughter, Princess Caroline of Great Britain, he had genuine respect and attachment. The Princess's affection for him was commonly said to be the reason for the close retirement in which she lived after his death. The manuscript of Hervey's memoirs was preserved by the family, but his son, Augustus John, 3rd Earl of Bristol, left strict injunctions that they should not be published until after the death of George III. In 1848 they were published under the editorship of J. W. Croker, but the manuscript had been subjected to a certain amount of mutilation before it came into his hands. Croker also softened in some cases the plainspokenness of the original. Hervey's account of court life and intrigues resembles in many points the memoirs of Horace Walpole, and the two books corroborate one another in many statements that might otherwise have been received with suspicion.

Until the publication of the Memoirs Hervey was chiefly known as the object of savage satire on the part of Alexander Pope, in whose works he figured as Lord Fanny, Sporus, Adonis and Narcissus. The quarrel is generally put down to Pope's jealousy of Hervey's friendship with Lady Mary Wortley Montagu. In the first of the Imitations of Horace, addressed to William Fortescue, Lord Fanny and Sappho were generally identified with Hervey and Lady Mary, although Pope denied the personal intention. Hervey had already been attacked in the Dunciad and the Peribathous, and he now retaliated. There is no doubt that he had a share in the Verses to the Imitator of Horace (1732) and it is possible that he was the sole author. In the Letter from a nobleman at Hampton Court to a Doctor of Divinity (1733), he scoffed at Pope's deformity and humble birth.

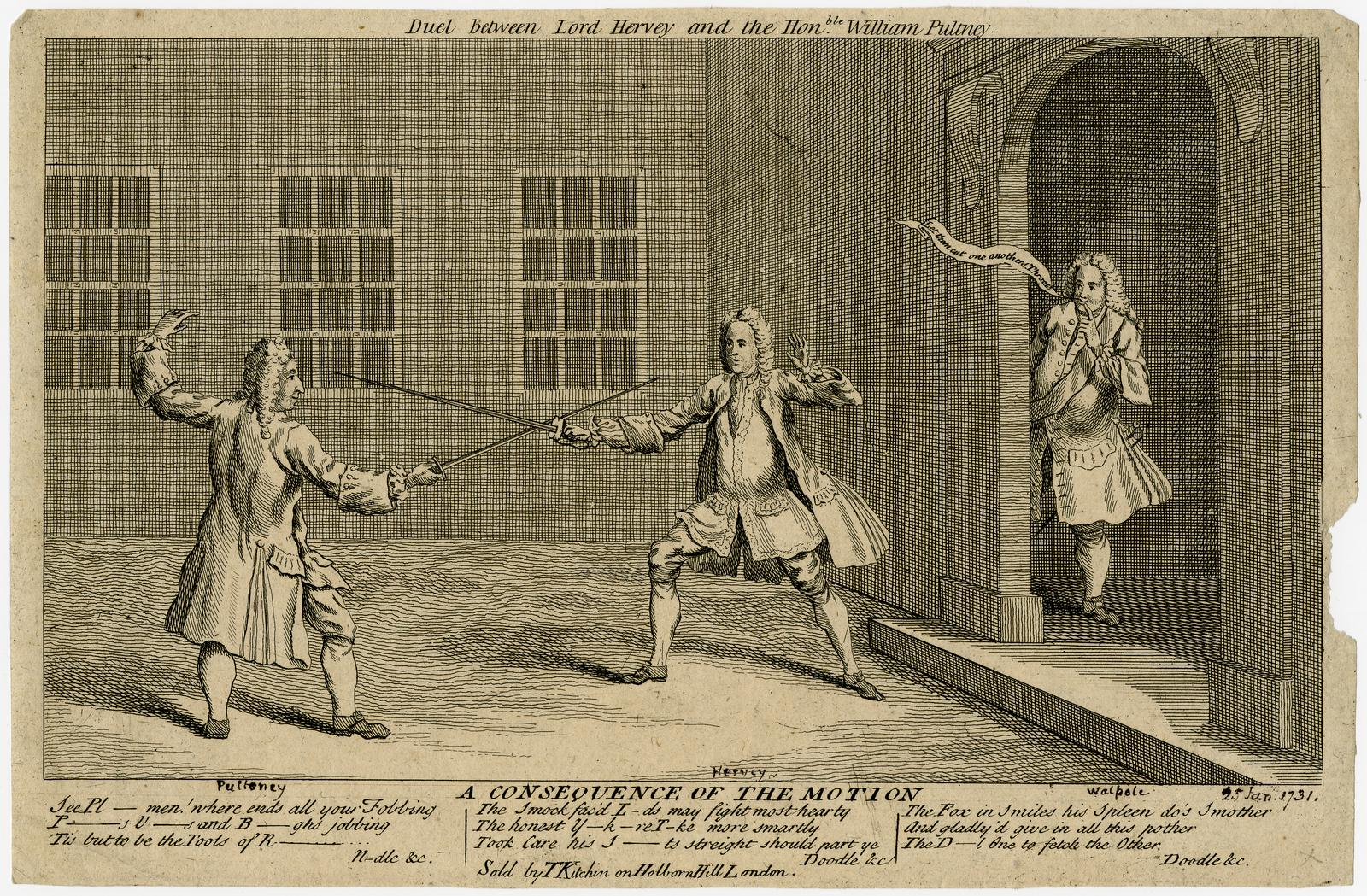
A depiction of the duel between Lord Hervey and William Pultney in 1731

Pope's reply was a Letter to a Noble Lord, dated November 1733, and the portrait of Sporus in the Epistle to Dr Arbuthnot (1743), which forms the prologue to the satires. Many of the insinuations and insults contained in it are borrowed from Pulteney's A Proper Reply to a late Scurrilous Libel.

Some literary critics, such as Martin C. Battestin, suggest that Pope's friend and fellow-satirist Henry Fielding intended the character of Beau Didapper in Joseph Andrews to be read as Hervey. Beau Didapper is described as obedient to the commands of a "Great Man" (presumably Walpole) "which he implicitly submitted to, at the Expence of his Conscience, his Honour, and of his Country." Didapper is also compared to Hylas, and is mistaken for a woman in the dark on account of his soft skin.

The malicious caricature of Sporus does Hervey great injustice, and he is not much better treated by Horace Walpole, who in reporting his death in a letter (14 August 1743) to Horace Mann, said he had outlived his last inch of character. Nevertheless, his writings prove him to have been a man of real ability, condemned by Walpole's tactics and distrust of able men to spend his life in court intrigue, the weapons of which, it must be owned, he used with the utmost adroitness. His wife Lady Hervey (1700–1768), of whom an account is to be found in Lady Louisa Stuart's Anecdotes, was a warm partisan of the Stuarts. She retained her wit and charm throughout her life, and has the distinction of being the recipient of English verses by Voltaire.

== Marriages, affairs, and sexuality ==
Hervey married Mary Lepell (1700–1768) on 21 April 1720. They had eight children:

1. George William Hervey, 2nd Earl of Bristol (1721–1775), unmarried
2. Lepell Hervey (15 April 1723 – 11 May 1780), married in 1743 Constantine John Phipps, 1st Baron Mulgrave, leaving issue
3. Augustus John Hervey, 3rd Earl of Bristol (1724–1779), died without legitimate issue
4. Mary Hervey (1725–1815), married 1747 George FitzGerald, of Turlough, County Mayo, and was the mother of the notoriously eccentric duellist George Robert FitzGerald, hanged for conspiracy to murder in 1786
5. Frederick Augustus Hervey, 4th Earl of Bristol (1730–1803), married 1752 Elizabeth Davers, had issue
6. General William Hervey (13 May 1732 – 1815), unmarried
7. Amelia Caroline Nassau Hervey (1734–1814), unmarried
8. Caroline Hervey (1736–1819), unmarried

Hervey was bisexual. He had an affair with Anne Vane, and possibly with Lady Townshend, Lady Mary Wortley Montagu and Princess Caroline. He lived with Stephen Fox often during the decade after he followed him to Italy in 1728. He wrote passionate love letters to Francesco Algarotti, whom he first met in 1736. He may have had a sexual affair with Prince Frederick before their friendship dissolved. He was in fact denounced as a sexually ambiguous figure in his time most notably by William Pulteney, then leader of the Opposition and as cited above, by Alexander Pope in his "Sporus" portrait: "Let Sporus tremble/What that thing of silk...His wit all seesaw between that and this/Now high, now low, now master up, now miss/And he himself one vile antithesis...". He was also attracted to Henry Fox before his affair with Stephen Fox.

== Ancestry ==
Ancestors of John Hervey, 2nd Baron Hervey

8. William Hervey (1587–1660)
4. Sir Thomas Hervey (1625–94)
9. Susan Jermyn (1590–1637)
2. John Hervey, 1st Earl of Bristol (1685–1750)
10. Sir Humphrey May (1573–1630)
5. Isabella May (1625–86)
11. Judith Poley (1598–)
1. John, Lord Hervey of Ickworth
12. Sir Henry Felton (-1690)
6. Sir Thomas Felton, 4th Baronet (1649–1709)
13. Susannah Tollemache (1621–)
3. Elizabeth Felton (1676–1741)
14. James Howard, 3rd Earl of Suffolk (1607–88)
7. Lady Elizabeth Howard (1656–81)
15. Barbara Villiers (1622–81)

== Writings ==
See Hervey's Memoirs of the Court of George II, edited by John Wilson Croker (1848); and an article by G. F. Russell Barker in the Dictionary of National Biography. Besides the Memoirs he wrote numerous political pamphlets, and some occasional verses.

== Modern portrayals ==
Hervey appears as a character in the 1999 British television series Aristocrats, where he is portrayed by Anthony Finigan. He is shown acting as a patron to the younger Henry Fox.

Hervey appears as a character in the historical novel Peter: The Untold True Story (2013) by Christopher Mechling, a tale of 18th-century feral child Peter the Wild Boy, whom the author believes to have been the inspiration for Peter Pan.

Parliament of Great Britain
Preceded by James Reynolds; Sir Jermyn Davers	MP for Bury St Edmunds; 1725–1733 with Sir Jermyn Davers 1725–1727; Thomas Norton 1727–1733	Succeeded by Thomas Hervey; Thomas Norton
Political offices
Preceded by Sir William Stanhope	Vice-Chamberlain of the Household; 1730–1740	Succeeded by Lord Sidney Beauclerk
Preceded by The Earl of Godolphin	Lord Privy Seal; 1740–1742	Succeeded by The Lord Gower
Peerage of Great Britain
Preceded by John Hervey	Baron Hervey (writ of acceleration); 1733–1743	Succeeded by George Hervey
