= Christopher Tower (MP, died 1771) =

English politician

Christopher Tower (c. 1694–1771), of Huntsmoor Park, near Iver, Buckinghamshire, was an English politician who sat in the House of Commons from 1727 to 1742.

Tower was the eldest son of Christopher Tower of Huntsmoor Park, and his wife Elizabeth Hale daughter of Richard Hale of New Windsor. He matriculated at Trinity College, Oxford on 7 May 1712, aged 17. In 1719, he married Jane Proctor, daughter of William Proctor of Epsom, Surrey. He succeeded his father to Huntsmoor in 1728.

Tower was returned as a Whig Member of Parliament (MP) for Lancaster at a by-election on 1 May 1727. He headed the poll at the succeeding 1727 British general election. In June 1732, he was granted the reversion of one of the posts as auditor of the imprest, while the other was held for his brother Thomas. As it turned out, they never succeeded to the posts. Tower was by then resident at Huntsmoor, and he transferred to Aylesbury for the 1734 British general election when he was elected in a contest. At the 1741 British general election he was put forward by the Administration for Bossiney. He was defeated at the poll but was returned on petition on 11 December 1741 and voted for Walpole's candidate for chairman of the elections committee on 16 December 1741. After the fall of Walpole, he was unseated on a further petition at Bossiney on 18 March 1742 and did not stand for Parliament again.

Tower was a director of the Bank of England from 1734 to 1740. In 1733 he became a trustee for the newly formed colony of Georgia on the east coast of America. In 1738 he was also made a councilman for the colony.

Tower's wife Jane died on 20 November 1739, and he married as his second wife on 25 October 1746, Jane Tash, eldest daughter of George Tash of Delaford Park.

Tower died on 6 September 1771. He had two daughters by his first wife, of whom Jane married her cousin Sir William Beauchamp Proctor, 1st Baronet. He had a son by his second wife. His younger brother was Thomas Tower.

== See also ==
- Trustees for the Establishment of the Colony of Georgia in America

Parliament of Great Britain
Preceded by William Heysham, junior Sir Thomas Lowther	Member of Parliament for Lancaster; 1727–1734; With: Sir Thomas Lowther	Succeeded by Robert Fenwick; Sir Thomas Lowther
Preceded by Edward Rudge; Thomas Ingoldsby	Member of Parliament for Aylesbury; 1734–1741; With: George Champion	Succeeded by Charles Pilsworth; Viscount Petersham
Preceded by Richard Liddell; Thomas Foster	Member of Parliament for Bossiney; 1741–1742; With: John Sabine	Succeeded by Richard Liddell; Thomas Foster
