= William FitzRoy (British Army officer) =

British Army general

Major-General William FitzRoy JP
- Born: 1832
- Died: 7 October 1902 (aged 69–70); London
- Military career
- Allegiance: United Kingdom
- Branch: British Army
- Service years: 1849–
- Rank: Major-General

Major-General William FitzRoy (1830 – 7 October 1902) was a British Army officer.

== Career ==
FitzRoy was born in 1830, the eldest son of William Simon Haughton FitzRoy (1802–1882), of Brookeside lodge, Warwickshire, by his wife Anne Bagge (1802–1860), daughter of Thomas Bagge (grandfather of Sir William Bagge, 1st Baronet). Through his father he was a great-grandson of Charles FitzRoy, 1st Baron Southampton, a paternal (though illegitimate) descendant of King Charles II of England.

He entered the army in 1849, was promoted to lieutenant in 1854, captain in 1855 and major in 1867. Further promotion to lieutenant-colonel followed in 1875, and to colonel in 1880. He commanded the 4th Regimental district, then between 1881 and 1886 the 61st Regimental district, and was appointed a major-general in 1886, after he retired.

He was a Justice of the peace for Warwickshire.

FitzRoy died at his residence, Northcote house, Rugby on 7 October 1902.

== Family ==
FitzRoy married in 1864 Gertrude Mary Wentworth, daughter of Captain S. H. Wentworth, Royal Engineers. She died in 1896. They had issue:

- William Wentworth FitzRoy (1867–1884)
- Captain Philip Fitzwilliam FitzRoy (1870–1923), an officer in the Royal Artillery
- Captain Frederick Henry FitzRoy (1872–1937), an officer in the Royal Naval Reserve
- George Francis FitzRoy (1873–1927)
- Sir Charles Edward FitzRoy (1876–1954), solicitor
- Major Robert Hope FitzRoy (b.1881–1952), an officer in the Royal Garrison Artillery
- a daughter
