= 96th Regiment of Foot (British Musketeers) =

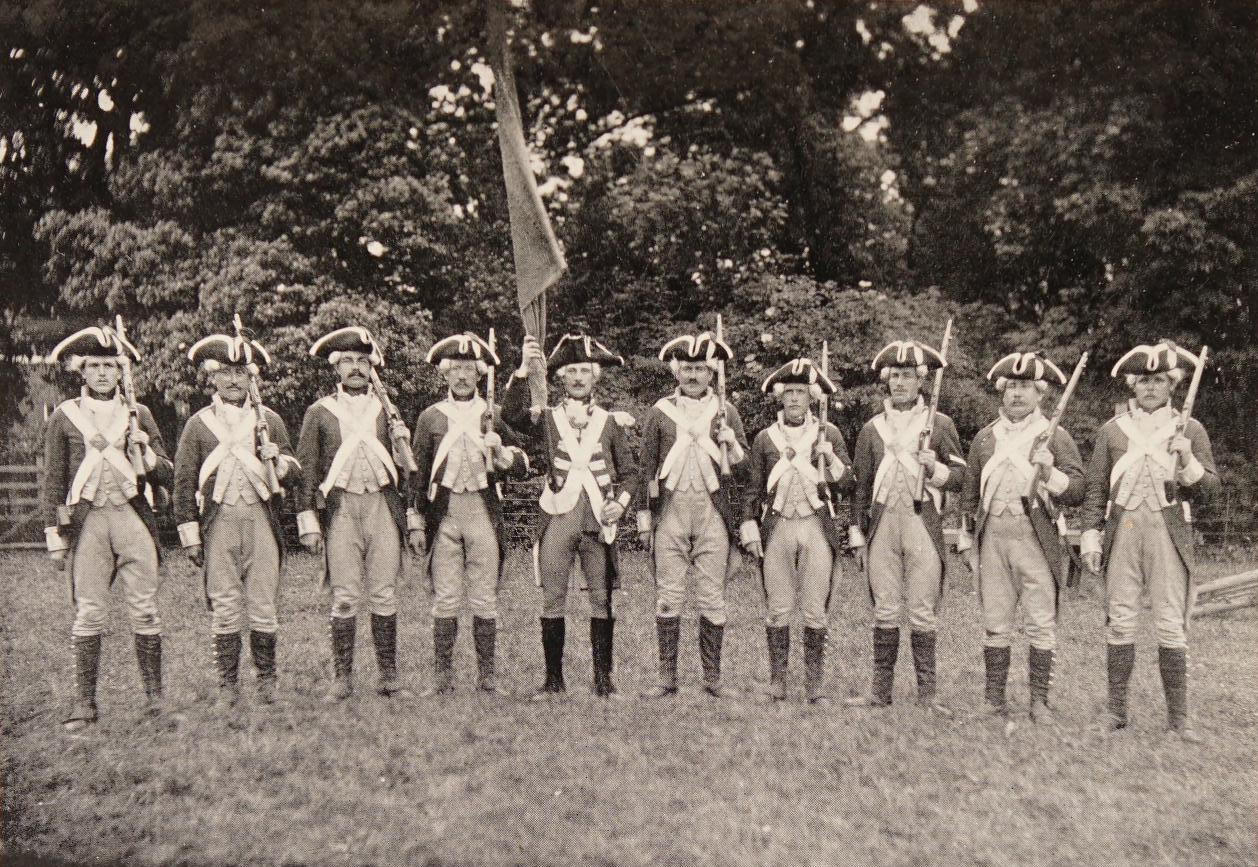
- Historical reenactment of the 96th Foot with the regiment's original Colour, London, 1910
- Active: 1780–1784
- Country: Kingdom of Great Britain
- Branch: British Army
- Type: Infantry

Commanders
- Colonel of the Regiment: Gen. Richard Whyte

The 96th Regiment of Foot (British Musketeers) was an infantry regiment in the British Army from 8 April 1780 to 1784. It was one of several regiments raised in consequence of the American Revolutionary War.

The Colonel-Commandant of the regiment was General Richard Whyte. After serving for some time in Ireland the regiment was posted to the Channel Isles, where it was disbanded in 1784.
