= William Stanhope, 2nd Earl of Harrington =

British politician and soldier

General The Right Honourable The Earl of Harrington

Member of Parliament for Bury St Edmunds
- In office 1747–1754 Serving with Felton Hervey
- Preceded by: Thomas Norton; Thomas Hervey
- Succeeded by: Felton Hervey; Earl of Euston

Member of Parliament for Aylesbury
- In office 1741–1747 Serving with Charles Pilsworth
- Preceded by: George Champion; Christopher Tower
- Succeeded by: The Earl of Inchiquin; Edward Willes

Personal details
- Born: William Stanhope; 18 December 1719
- Died: 1 April 1779 (aged 59)
- Spouse: Lady Caroline FitzRoy (m. 1746)
- Children: Caroline Mackenzie, Countess of Seaforth; Isabella Molyneux, Countess of Sefton; Amelia Barry, Countess of Barrymore; Charles Stanhope, 3rd Earl of Harrington; Henry Fitzroy Stanhope; Henrietta Foley, Baroness Foley; Anna Maria, Lady Craufurd
- Parent(s): William Stanhope, 1st Earl of Harrington; Anne Griffith (daughter of Colonel Edward Griffith and Elizabeth Lawrence)

Military service
- Battles/wars: Battle of Fontenoy

General William Stanhope, 2nd Earl of Harrington (18 December 1719 – 1 April 1779) was a British politician and soldier.

== Early life ==
Coat of Arms of the Earls of Harrington

Stanhope was the son of William Stanhope, 1st Earl of Harrington and Anne Griffith. His mother died giving birth to William and his twin brother, Thomas (1719–1743).

His paternal grandparents were John Stanhope and Dorothy Agard. His uncle, Charles Stanhope, was also a politician and deeply involved in the South Sea Company financial scandal, while his father's cousin James Stanhope, was considered an alternative candidate to Robert Walpole for the title of Britain's first Prime Minister. His maternal grandparents were Col. Edward Griffith and Elizabeth (née Lawrence) Griffith.

== Career ==
Stanhope took up a military career and joined the Foot Guards in 1741, and was also returned for Aylesbury. He was wounded at the Battle of Fontenoy and shortly thereafter, om 5 June 1745, he was appointed colonel of the Second Troop of Horse Grenadier Guards, an appointment he held for the remainder of his life.

In 1747, he became MP for Bury St Edmunds, and in 1755, was promoted Major-general. He succeeded to the earldom in 1756, and was promoted Lieutenant-general in 1758 and General in 1770.

== Personal life ==
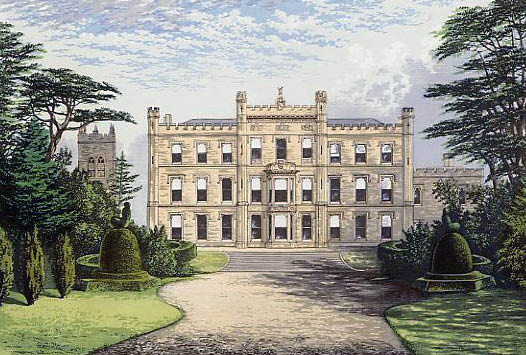
Elvaston Castle

On 11 August 1746, he married Lady Caroline FitzRoy (1722–1784), daughter of Charles FitzRoy, 2nd Duke of Grafton, (Note: The 2nd Duke of Grafton was the only child and heir of Henry FitzRoy, 1st Duke of Grafton (1663–1690) (an illegitimate son of King Charles II by his mistress Barbara Villiers) by his wife Isabella Bennet, 2nd Countess of Arlington, a great-granddaughter of William the Silent.) and Lady Henrietta Somerset (the daughter of Charles Somerset, Marquess of Worcester). Together, they had seven children:

- Lady Caroline Stanhope (1747–1767), who married Kenneth Mackenzie, 1st Earl of Seaforth.
- Lady Isabella Stanhope (c. 1748–1819), who married Charles Molyneux, 1st Earl of Sefton.
- Lady Amelia Stanhope (1749–1780), who married Richard Barry, 6th Earl of Barrymore.
- Charles Stanhope, 3rd Earl of Harrington (1753–1829), who married Jane Fleming, daughter of Sir John Fleming, 1st Baronet, in 1778; she was a Lady of the Bedchamber to Queen Charlotte.
- Capt. Hon. Henry Fitzroy Stanhope (1754–1828), who married Elizabeth Falconer. (Note: Capt. Hon. Henry Fitzroy Stanhope was subject to a court martial in June 1783 over his actions during the invasion of Tobago but was found not guilty. The Lieutenant Governor of the island George Ferguson was also cleared of any blame at a subsequent enquiry. Henry Stanhope went on to become MP for Bramber from February 1782 until 1784.)
- Lady Henrietta Stanhope (c. 1756–1781), who married Thomas Foley, 2nd Baron Foley.
- Lady Anna Maria Stanhope (c. 1760–1834), who married Thomas Pelham-Clinton, 3rd Duke of Newcastle-under-Lyne in 1782. After his death in 1795, she married Lt.-Gen. Sir Charles Craufurd in 1800.

Lord Harrington died on 1 April 1779.

=== Reputation ===
He was known to society as "the goat of quality" for the dissipation of his personal life: he visited the brothel of Sarah Prendergast in King's Place, St James's, London, four times a week. His wife Lady Harrington formed "The New Female Coterie", a group of demimondaines which met in the same house.

Parliament of Great Britain
Preceded by George Champion; Christopher Tower	Member for Aylesbury; 1741–1747; With: Charles Pilsworth	Succeeded by The Earl of Inchiquin; Edward Willes
Preceded by Thomas Norton; Thomas Hervey	Member for Bury St Edmunds; 1747–1754; With: Felton Hervey	Succeeded by Felton Hervey; Earl of Euston
Military offices
Preceded by The Earl of Rothes	Captain and Colonel of the 2nd Troop Horse Grenadier Guards; 1745–1779	Succeeded by The Lord Amherst
Peerage of Great Britain
Preceded by William Stanhope	Earl of Harrington; 1756–1779	Succeeded by Charles Stanhope
Preceded by William Stanhope	Baron Harrington; 1756–1779	Succeeded by Charles Stanhope
