= George Hervey, 2nd Earl of Bristol =

English diplomat and politician

George Hervey
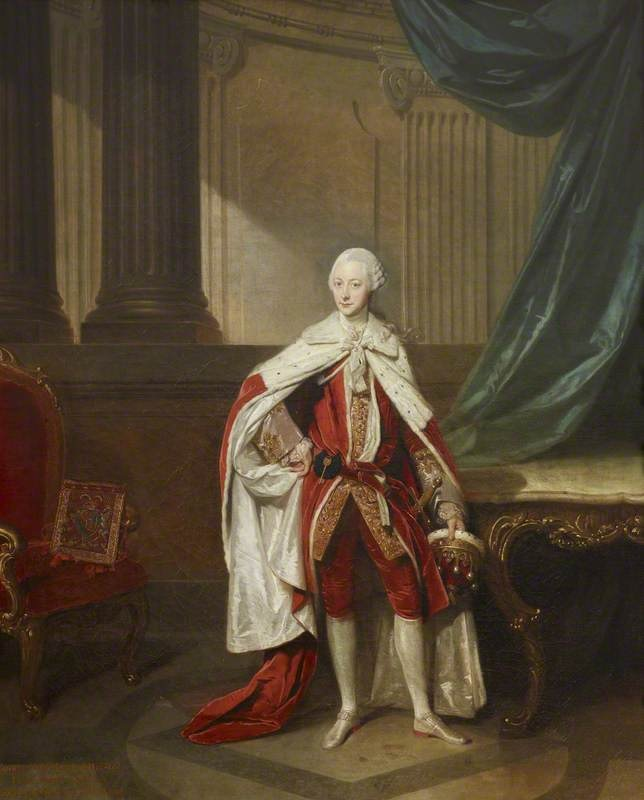

British Ambassador to Spain
- In office 1758–1761
- Preceded by: Benjamin Keene
- Succeeded by: William Zuylestein

Personal details
- Born: 3 August 1721
- Died: March 1775 (aged 53)
- Parent(s): John Hervey; Mary Lepell

Military service
- Allegiance: Great Britain

George William Hervey, 2nd Earl of Bristol (3 August 1721 – 18/20 March 1775) was an English diplomat and politician who was the eldest son of John Hervey, 2nd Baron Hervey, by his marriage with Mary Hervey.

Lord Bristol served for some years in the British Army, and in 1755 was sent to Turin as envoy extraordinary. He was ambassador at Madrid from 1758 to 1761, filling a difficult position with credit and dignity, and ranked among the followers of William Pitt the Elder.

Appointed Lord Lieutenant of Ireland in 1766, he never visited that country during his short tenure of this office, and, after having served for a short time as keeper of the Privy Seal, became Groom of the Stool to George III in January 1770. He died unmarried, despite a youthful flirtation with the Lady Townshend, and was succeeded by his brother.

Diplomatic posts
Unknown	British Minister at Turin; 1755–1758	Succeeded by James Stuart-Mackenzie
Preceded by Benjamin Keene	British Ambassador to Spain; 1758–1761	Vacant No representation due to war Title next held by The Earl of Rochford
Political offices
Preceded by The Earl of Hertford	Lord Lieutenant of Ireland; 1766	Succeeded by The Viscount Townshend
Preceded by The Earl of Chatham	Lord Privy Seal; 1768–1770	Succeeded by The Earl of Halifax
Peerage of England
Preceded by John Hervey	Earl of Bristol; 1751–1775	Succeeded by Augustus Hervey
