= The Ballad of Molly Mogg =

1726 poem by John Gay

- by John Gay; Alexander Pope; Dean Swift
- First published in: 1726
- Country: England
- Language: English
- Publisher: Mist's Weekly Journal

The Ballad of Molly Mogg (first published as "Molly Mogg, or the Fair Maid of the Inn") is a poem written by John Gay with contributions from Alexander Pope and Dean Swift. It is written about Molly Mogg, the beautiful barmaid at the Rose Inn, Wokingham, England.

== Background ==
In the early 18th century, Gay, Swift and Pope were regular customers to the Rose Inn public house in Wokingham, which was run by John Mogg (though John Timbs identifies the public house as the Rose Inn in Covent Garden) On one visit, they were forced to stay in the inn longer than planned due to a storm. To pass the time, they wrote verses about Molly, the attractive eldest daughter of the landlord. The poem alludes to the melancholy mood of Edward Standen, the heir to Arborfield Manor and customer of the inn, who had fallen in love with (and was repeatedly rejected by) Molly.

Molly was born in 1699 and never married, despite her beauty. She died a spinster at the age of 67 in 1766. Her death record named her as "Mary Mogg" and described her as "advanced in years but in her youth a celebrated beauty and toast, possessed of a good fortune that she has left among her relations". Her only brother had no son, so when Molly died the Mogg family name ended. Edward Standen died in 1730 at the age of 27.

== Poem ==
Says my Uncle, I pray you discover,
What hath been the cause of your woes,
Why you pine and you whine like a lover?
I've seen Molly Mog of the Rose.

Oh, nephew, your grief is but folly,
In town you may find better prog;
Half-a-crown there will get you a Molly,
A Molly much better than Mog.

I know that by wits 'tis recited
That Women at best are a clog,
But I'm not so easily frightened
From loving my sweet Molly Mog.

The School Boy's delight is a play day,
The School Master's joy is a flog.
The Milkmaid's delight is a May day,
But mine is on sweet Molly Mog.

Will of wisp leaves the traveller gadding
Through ditch and through quagmire and bog.
But no light can set me a-madding
Like the eyes of my sweet Molly Mog.

For guineas in other men's breeches
Your gamester will palm and will cog,
But I envy them none of their riches,
So I may win sweet Molly Mog.

The heart when half wounded is changing,
It here and there leaps like a frog.
But my heart can never be ranging,
'Tis so fixed upon sweet Molly Mog.

Who follows all Ladies of pleasure
In pleasure is thought but a hog.
All the sea cannot give so good measure
Of joys as my sweet Molly Mog.

I feel I am in love to distraction,
My senses all lost in a fog,
And nothing can give satisfaction
But thinking of sweet Molly Mog.

A letter when I am indicting,
Comes Cupid and gives me a jog,
And I fill all the paper with writing
Of nothing but sweet Molly Mog.

If I would not give up the three Graces
I wish I were hanged like a dog,
And in court all the drawing-room faces,
For a glance of my sweet Molly Mog.

Those faces want nature and spirit
And seem as cut out of a log;
Juno, Venus and Pallas's merit
Unite in my sweet Molly Mog.

Those who toast all the family Royal
In bumpers of hogan and nog,
Have hearts not more true or more loyal
Than mine to my sweet Molly Mog.

Were Virgil alive with his Phillis,
And writing another eclogue,
Both his Phillis and fair Amaryllis
He'd give up for sweet Molly Mog.

While she smiles on each guest like her liquor,
Then jealousy sets me agog,
To be sure she's a bit for the Vicar,
And so I shall lose Molly Mog.

== Legacy ==
The poem was first published in 1726 in Mist's Weekly Journal, and was described as having been "writ by two or three men of wit, upon the occasion of their lying at a certain Inn at Ockingham, where the daughter of the House was remarkably pretty, and whose name was Molly Mog."

The Welsh ballad "Gwinfrid Shones" (published in 1733) also mentions Mogg:

Some sing Molly Mogg of the Rose,
And call her the Oakingham belle;
Whilst others does ferces compose,
On beautiful Molle Lapelle.

Molly Mogg's, a public house in London's Soho district (at the junction of Old Compton Street and Charing Cross Road) is named after Mogg.

== Sources ==
- Arborfield Local History Society (2010), Standen Family, Arborfield, Berkshire: Arborfield Local History Society
- Fletcher, Damien (25 March 2010), What's Inn a Name? Secrets Behind the People Pubs Are Named After, London: Daily Mirror
- Ford, David Nash (2001a), Wokingham, Finchampstead, Berkshire: Royal Berkshire History
- Ford, David Nash (2001b), The Ballad of Molly Mog, Finchampstead, Berkshire: Royal Berkshire History
- Millson, Cecilia (1986), Old Berkshire Tales, Newbury, Berkshire: Countryside Books, ISBN 0-905392-69-8
- Drabble, Margaret, ed. (2000), "Molly Mog, or The Fair Maid of the Inn", Oxford Companion to English Literature, Oxford, Oxfordshire: Oxford University Press
- Timbs, John (1866), Club Life of London, London: J. Bentley
