= Augustus Hervey, 3rd Earl of Bristol =

Royal Navy officer and politician (1724–1779)

Vice-Admiral The Right Honourable The Earl of Bristol PC
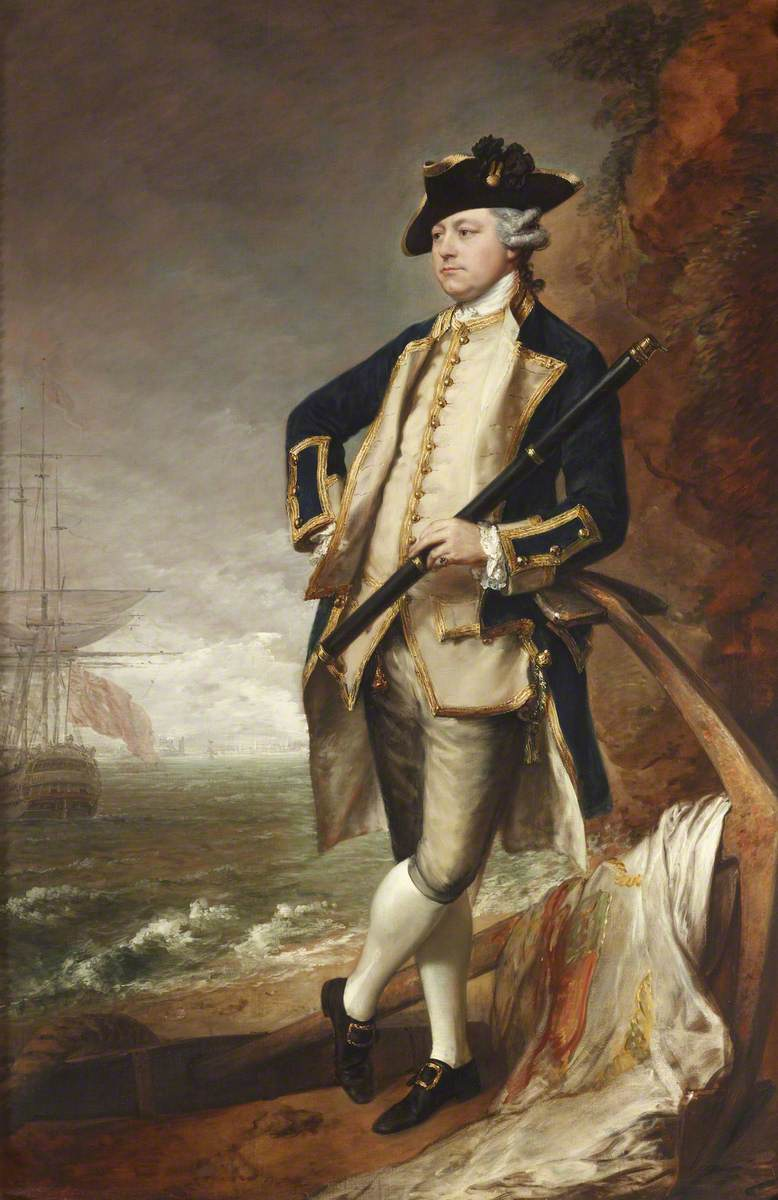
- Portrait of Augustus Hervey by Thomas Gainsborough, 1767
- Born: 19 May 1724; Derbyshire
- Died: 23 December 1779 (aged 55); St James's Square, London
- Burial place: Ickworth, Suffolk
- Spouse: Elizabeth Chudleigh
- Military career
- Allegiance: Great Britain
- Branch: Royal Navy
- Service years: 1735–1775
- Rank: Vice admiral
- Commands: HMS Princess; HMS Phoenix; HMS Defiance; HMS Hampton Court; HMS Monmouth; HMS Dragon; HMS Centurion; Mediterranean Fleet
- Conflicts: Seven Years' War

Vice-Admiral Augustus John Hervey, 3rd Earl of Bristol, PC (19 May 1724 – 23 December 1779) was a Royal Navy officer and politician. He commanded the sixth-rate HMS Phoenix at the Battle of Minorca in May 1756 as well as the third-rate HMS Dragon at the Capture of Belle Île in June 1761, the Invasion of Martinique in January 1762 and the Battle of Havana in June 1762 during the Seven Years' War. He went on to be Chief Secretary for Ireland and then First Naval Lord.

== Early life ==
Hervey was born the second son of John, Lord Hervey and educated at Westminster School from 1733. He entered the Royal Navy in 1735 and was promoted to lieutenant in 1740.

== Naval career ==
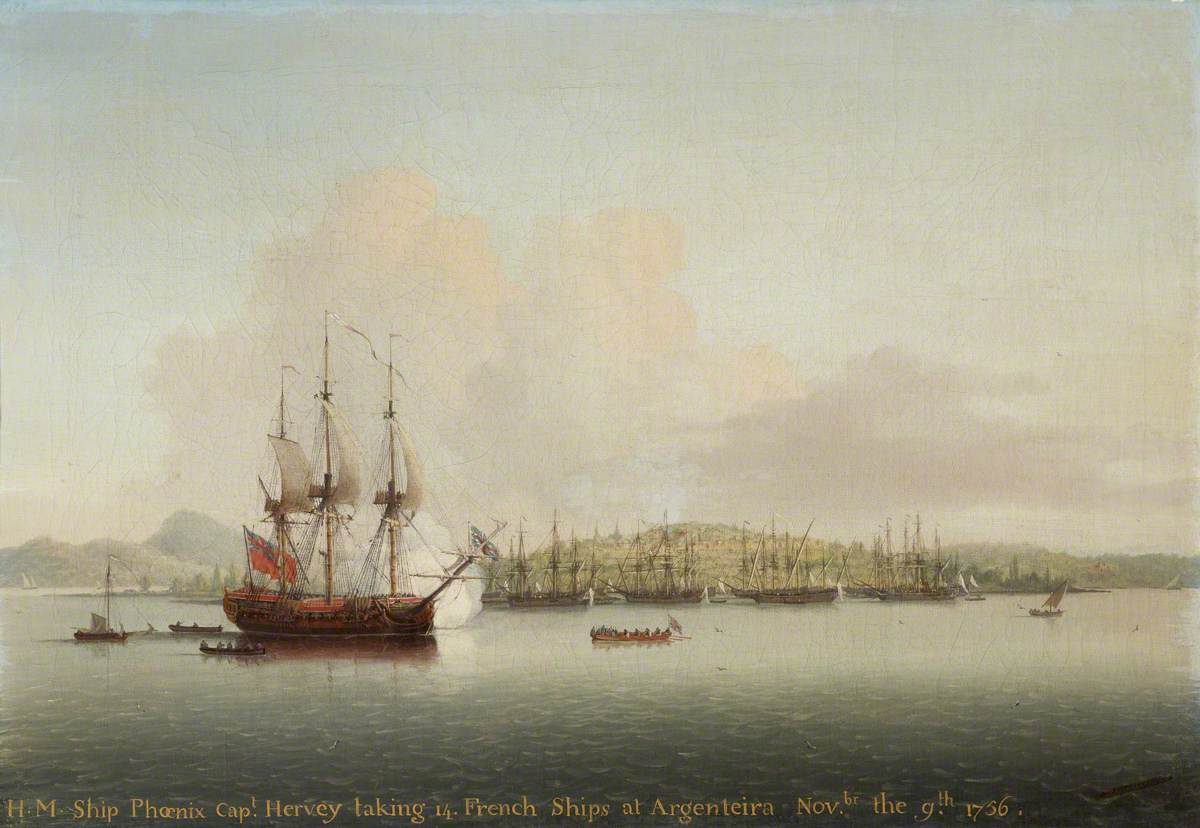
HMS Phoenix capturing 14 French ships at Argentiera on 9 November 1756

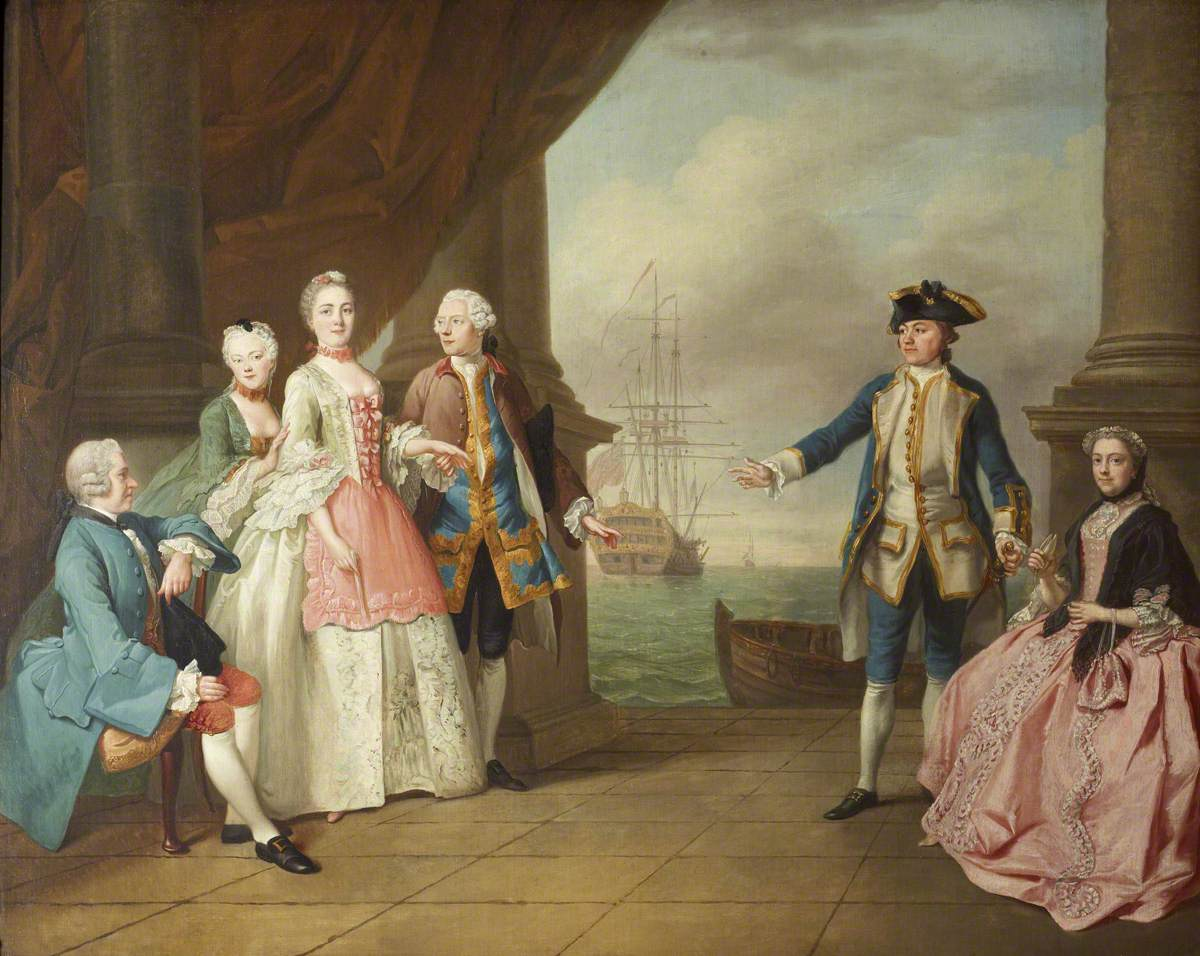
1750 painting of Hervey (second from right) by Jean-Étienne Liotard

Promoted to post-captain on 15 January 1747, Hervey was given command of the third-rate HMS Princess and later the sixth-rate HMS Phoenix in January 1752 and saw action in her at the Battle of Minorca in May 1756. He went on to command the fourth-rate HMS Defiance later that month, the third-rate HMS Hampton Court in May 1757 and the third-rate HMS Monmouth in March 1758.

Hervey distinguished himself in several encounters with the French, and was of great assistance to Admiral Hawke in 1759, although he had returned to England before the Battle of Quiberon Bay in November 1759. He took command of the third-rate HMS Dragon in March 1760 and saw action during the Capture of Belle Île in June 1761, the Invasion of Martinique in January 1762 and the Battle of Havana in June 1762 before transferring to the fourth-rate HMS Centurion in May 1763.

Having served with distinction in the West Indies under Rodney, his active life at sea ceased when the Peace of Paris was concluded in February 1763. He was, however, nominally Commander-in-Chief of the Mediterranean Fleet in this year. He was promoted to rear-admiral on 31 March 1775 and to vice-admiral on 29 January 1778. He was known as the English Casanova, due to his colourful personal life.

== Political career ==
Hervey was Member of Parliament for Bury St Edmunds from 1757 to 1763, and, after being for a short time Member for Saltash, again represented Bury St Edmunds from 1768 until he succeeded his brother in the earldom of Bristol in 1775; as a member of the House of Lords, he automatically became ineligible to sit in the Commons. He often took part in debates in Parliament, and was a frequent contributor to periodical literature. He was an opponent of the Rockingham ministry and a strong defender of Admiral Keppel with whom he had worked closely.

He was a Groom of the Bedchamber to King George III from 1763 to 1775 and Chief Secretary to the Lord Lieutenant of Ireland from 1766 to 1767. He joined the Board of Admiralty as First Naval Lord in the North ministry in February 1771 and stood down from the Admiralty Board in April 1775.

== Personal life ==
In August 1744 Hervey had been secretly married to Elizabeth Chudleigh (1720–1788), afterwards Duchess of Kingston, but this union was dissolved in 1769. Lord Bristol died leaving no legitimate issue, and having, as far as possible, alienated his property from the title.

In 1748 after Hervey had rejoined his ship and his marriage was foundering, he had formed a deep passion for Etheldreda Townshend, who had previously attracted the amorous attentions of both his elder brother George and his father.

In about 1765 Hervey paid to take Ann Elliot off the stage to become his mistress. She would go on to take the King's brother as her lover. From 1775 Hervey had taken as his mistress Mary Nesbitt, a former artists' model of some notoriety. They lived together, apparently faithfully, at his Surrey home of Norwood House and she received property in his will. He made changes to Norwood House including an ornamental lake and a stable. He died due to gout in the stomach at St James's Square, London on 23 December 1779, aged 55, and was buried at Ickworth in Suffolk; he was succeeded by his brother Frederick.

Many of his letters are in the Record Office, and his journals are in the British Museum. Other letters are printed in the Grenville Papers, vols. iii. and iv. (London, 1852–1853), and the Life of Admiral Keppel, by the Rev. Thomas Keppel (London, 1852). Hervey Bay, Queensland, a bay and city in the Fraser Coast region of Australia, was named after him by Captain James Cook while carrying out the survey of the east coast of Australia on 22 May 1770. Bristol Bay, the rich salmon fishing ground in southwest Alaska, was so named in honour of Hervey by Captain James Cook, who first charted the region in July 1778. Bristol Island, a five-mile long ice-covered quake-prone chain of volcanos in the South Sandwich Islands and the coral atoll comprising the islands of Manuae and Te-O-Au-Tu in the Cook Islands were also named in honour of Hervey by Captain James Cook.

== Sources ==
- Courtney, William Prideaux (1891). "Hervey, Augustus John" . In Stephen, Leslie; Lee, Sidney (eds.). Dictionary of National Biography. Vol. 26. London: Smith, Elder & Co.
- Keppel, Thomas (1842). The life of Augustus, Viscount Keppel. Henry Colburn. p. 353. "augustus hervey keppel."
- Rodger, N.A.M. (1979). The Admiralty. Offices of State. Lavenham: T. Dalton Ltd. ISBN 0900963948.

Parliament of Great Britain
Preceded by Felton Hervey; Earl of Euston	Member of Parliament for Bury St Edmunds; 1757–1763; With: Felton Hervey 1757–1761; Charles FitzRoy 1761–1763	Succeeded by Charles Fitzroy; William Hervey
Preceded by John Clevland; George Adams	Member of Parliament for Saltash; 1763–1768; With: George Adams	Succeeded by Martin Hawke; Thomas Bradshaw
Preceded by Charles Fitzroy; William Hervey	Member of Parliament for Bury St Edmunds; 1768–1775; With: Charles Fitzroy 1768–1774; Sir Charles Davers 1774–1775	Succeeded by Sir Charles Davers; Henry Seymour Conway
Political offices
Preceded by Viscount Beauchamp	Chief Secretary for Ireland; 1766–1767	Succeeded by Theophilus Jones
Military offices
Preceded by Sir Francis Holburne (as Senior Naval Lord)	First Naval Lord; 1771–1775	Succeeded by Sir Hugh Palliser
Peerage of Great Britain
Preceded by George Hervey	Earl of Bristol; 1775–1779	Succeeded by Frederick Hervey
