= 119th (The Prince's Own) Regiment of Foot =

Infantry regiment of the British Army

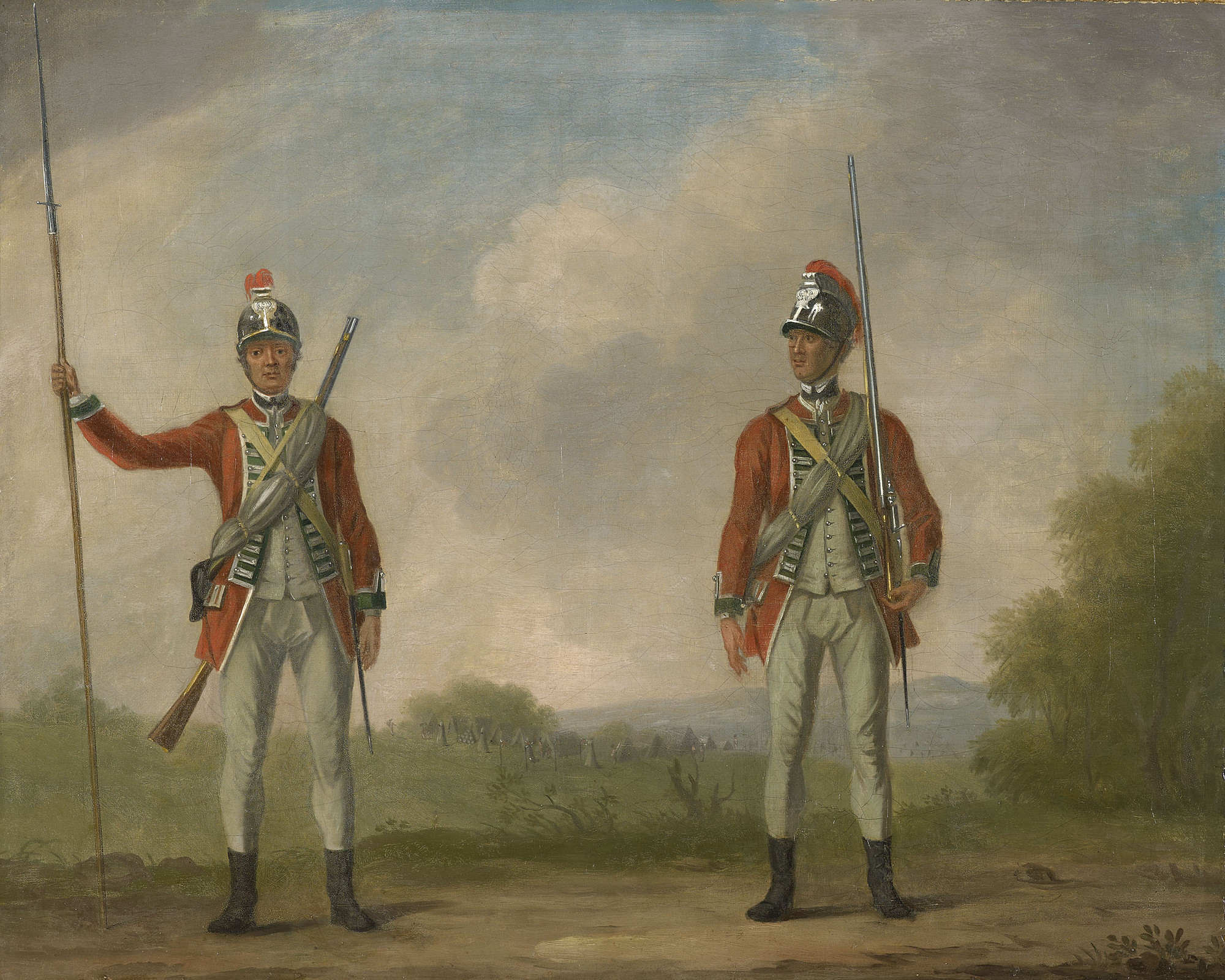
c. 1762 painting of two regimental privates

The 119th (The Prince's Own) Regiment of Foot was a line infantry regiment of the British Army. It was raised in 1761 during the Seven Years' War via the regimentation of several independent companies and disbanded in 1763 upon the conclusion of the conflict.
