= John Fayram =

English painter (died 1744)

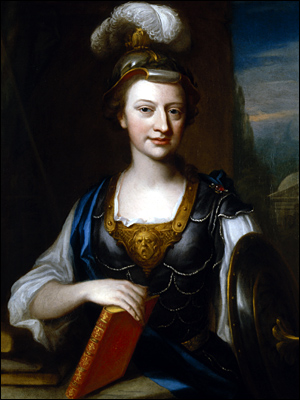
Portrait of Elizabeth Carter, ca. 1740

John Fayram was an English portrait and landscape painter, who practised in London. He died in 1744.

== Life ==
Fayram was active before 1744.

There are by him some slight, coarse etchings of views in the neighbourhood of Chelsea and Battersea, and also one of the Hermitage in Kew Gardens. He also has a number of portraits in national collections. Many of these are of the Hervey family including Felton Hervey.
