= William Crofts =

William Crofts may refer to:

- William Crofts, 1st Baron Crofts (c. 1611–1677), English Peer and Gentleman of the Bedchamber
- William Crofts (MP), Member of Parliament for Bury St Edmunds, 1685–89
- William Carr Crofts (1846–1898), architect and photographer
- William Crofts (rower) (1846–1912), rower and schoolmaster

== See also ==
- William Croft (disambiguation)
