= James Oakes =

James Oakes may refer to:

- James Oakes (historian) (born 1953), professor of history at the City University of New York
- James L. Oakes (1924–2007), judge of the United States Court of Appeals for the Second Circuit
- Jimmy Oakes (1902–1992), English footballer
- James Oakes (diarist) (1741–1829), diarist, businessman and banker
- James Oakes (MP) (1821–1901), British Conservative politician
