= 1944 Bury St Edmunds by-election =

UK by-election

← 1935	29 February 1944	1945 →

Constituency of Bury St Edmunds
- Turnout: 50.8%
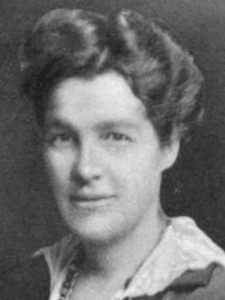
	First party	Second party
	Con
Candidate	Edgar Keatinge	Margery Corbett Ashby
Party	Conservative	Independent Liberal
Popular vote	11,705	9,121
Percentage	56.2%	43.8%
MP before election
Frank Heilgers
Conservative
Elected MP
Edgar Keatinge
Conservative

The 1944 Bury St Edmunds by-election was a parliamentary by-election for the British House of Commons constituency of Bury St Edmunds, Suffolk on 29 February 1944.

== Vacancy ==
The by-election was caused by the death of the sitting Conservative MP, Frank Heilgers who was killed in the Ilford rail crash on 16 January 1944. A local man, he had been MP here since holding the seat in 1931.

== Election history ==
Bury St Edmunds had been won by the Conservatives at every election since the seat was created in 1885 and was a safe seat. So safe was it that Heilgers was returned unopposed in 1931 and 1935.

== Candidates ==
The local Conservatives selected 39-year-old Edgar Keatinge. Keatinge served in the Royal Artillery. He commanded a mountain battery of the West African Frontier Force, and became the first commander of the West African Artillery School. When, after serious illness, he returned to Suffolk in 1943, he was again attached to the Suffolk Yeomanry, eventually reaching the rank of lieutenant-colonel. He had been a member of West Suffolk County Council since 1933, and was selected in 1938 as the Conservative prospective parliamentary candidate for the Isle of Ely constituency, to stand against Liberal MP James de Rothschild. The parties had expected a general election in late 1939, but it was postponed for the duration of the war.

The Bury St Edmunds Liberals had selected H.C. Drayton as prospective parliamentary candidate for the next general election. At the outbreak of war, the Conservative, Liberal and Labour parties had agreed an electoral truce which meant that when a by-election occurred, the party that was defending the seat would not be opposed by an official candidate from the other two parties. When the Labour and Liberal parties joined the Coalition government, it was agreed that any by-election candidate defending a government seat would receive a letter of endorsement jointly signed by all the party leaders. This was enough to deter Bury St Edmunds Liberals from submitting their candidate.

However, the 62-year-old leading Liberal activist Margery Corbett Ashby decided to contest the seat. She resigned her position in the Liberal Party, and stood as an Independent Liberal candidate, with the support of the Radical Action group. She had been President of the International Woman Suffrage Alliance since 1923. She received an honorary LLD at Mount Holyoke College, USA, in 1937 in recognition of her international work. In 1942 she went on a government propaganda mission to Sweden. She had no connection with the area and it hardly seemed the most promising of seats for a Liberal to enter parliament. Ashby had a track record of flying the Liberal flag in some less hopeful constituencies that included 1918 Birmingham Ladywood, 1922 and 1923 Richmond, Surrey, 1924 Watford, 1929 Hendon and 1935 and 1937 Hemel Hempstead.

== Campaign ==
Polling day was set for 29 February 1944. When nominations closed, it was to reveal a two horse race, between the Conservative Keatinge and the Independent Liberal Ashby.

Keatinge received a joint letter of endorsement from all the leaders of the parties in the coalition, including Liberal Leader, Sir Archibald Sinclair. It was also announced that H.C. Drayton, the local Liberals ppc would speak in support of Keatinge.

Unlike the Independent Liberal candidates at 1943 Chippenham by-election and 1943 Darwen by-election, Ashby attracted plenty of outside help, firstly from large numbers of Liberals who were growing tired of the electoral truce. Secondly, she was able to enlist the support of Richard Acland and his successful Common Wealth Party by-election circus. Furthermore, she benefited from organised support in Bury St Edmunds that went by the name of the United Progressive Front. This group included Liberal, Labour and Communist activists, harking back to the pre-war days of the Popular Front.

The contest gained national attention, and became seen as a test of the credibility of the government.

== Result ==
The Conservative Keatinge hung onto the seat;

Bury St Edmunds by-election, 1944 Electorate
Party	Candidate	Votes	%	±%
Conservative	Edgar Keatinge	11,705	56.2	N/A
Independent Liberal	Margery Corbett Ashby	9,121	43.8	New
Majority		2,584	12.4	N/A
Turnout		20,828	50.8	N/A
Conservative hold		Swing	N/A	

== Aftermath ==
Neither Keatinge nor Ashby stood at the 1945 general election. The result at the following General Election saw the anti-Tory vote increase to the point that they would have gained the seat had the vote not been split between three candidates;

General election 1945: Bury St Edmunds Electorate 45,482
Party	Candidate	Votes	%	±%
Conservative	Geoffrey Clifton-Brown	15,013	48.7	−7.5
Labour	Cecily Alicia McCall	9,195	29.8	New
Liberal	H.C. Drayton	5,863	19.0	New
Common Wealth	E. C. Gordon England	750	2.4	New
Majority		5,818	18.9	−6.5
Turnout		30,821	67.8	+17.0
Conservative hold		Swing		

== See also ==
- List of United Kingdom by-elections
- United Kingdom by-election records
