= Edward Greene (MP) =

English brewer and Conservative politician

Edward Greene (17 August 1815 – 5 April 1891) was an English brewer and Conservative politician who sat in the House of Commons between 1865 and 1891.

Greene was the son of Benjamin Greene, a West Indies Slave owner, who established the Greene King brewery in Bury St Edmunds in 1799. Greene was educated at the Grammar School at Bury St Edmunds and in 1836 took over the management of the brewery company from his father. He expanded and diversified the company significantly, doubling the brewery workforce to fifty and increasing output to 40,000 barrels a year by 1870. Greene introduced unprecedented benefits for his workforce including a pension scheme and new standards of housing for his workers. He was a J.P. and Deputy Lieutenant for Suffolk and a master of the Suffolk Fox Hounds.

Greene was elected at the 1865 general election as Member of Parliament (MP) for Bury St Edmunds, and held the seat until the constituency was reduced to one member at the 1885 general election.

He did not stand in 1885, but at the 1886 general election he was elected for the Stowmarket constituency, and held that seat until his death in 1891, aged 75.

Greene married firstly in 1840 Emily Smythies, daughter of Rev. G Smythies of Stanground near Peterborough, and secondly in 1870 Caroline Dorothea Hoste, daughter of Charles Prideaux Brune and widow of Rear Admiral Sir William Hoste. His son Edward succeeded as brewer and MP.

Parliament of the United Kingdom
Preceded by Lord Alfred Hervey and Joseph Hardcastle	Member of Parliament for Bury St Edmunds; 1865–1885; With: Joseph Hardcastle to 1874; Lord Francis Hervey 1874–1880; Joseph Hardcastle 1880–1885	Succeeded by Lord Francis Hervey
Preceded by Felix Cobbold	Member of Parliament for Stowmarket; 1886–1891	Succeeded by Sydney Stern
