= Sir Robert Crane, 1st Baronet =

English politician

Sir Robert Crane
- Baronet of Chilton
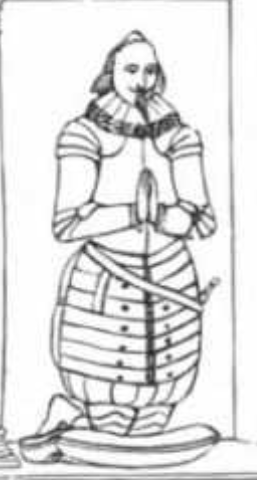
- Born: 1585; Chilton, Suffolk, Kingdom of England
- Died: 17 February 1642 (aged 56–57); London, Kingdom of England
- Spouse: Dorothea Hobart (m. 1616 – 1624) Susan Alington (m. 1624 – d. 1642)
- Issue: Mary Hare Anne Armine Susan Walpole Katherine Bacon
- Father: Henry Crane Esq., of Chilton
- Mother: Katherine Jerningham

Sir Robert Crane, 1st Baronet (1586 – February 1643) of Chilton, Suffolk and of Buckenham Tofts, Norfolk, was an English politician who sat in the House of Commons variously between 1614 and 1643.

Crane was the son of Henry Crane of Chilton and educated in the law at the Inner Temple and Lincoln's Inn.

In 1614 Crane was elected Member of Parliament for Sudbury and held the seat until 1620. He was elected MP for Suffolk in 1621 and re-elected MP for Sudbury in 1624 and 1625. He was created a Baronet of Chilton, in Suffolk on 21 April 1626. Crane was re-elected MP for Suffolk in 1626 and re-elected MP for Sudbury in 1628. He sat until 1629 when King Charles decided to rule without parliament for eleven years. In 1632–33 Crane was High Sheriff of Suffolk.

In April 1640, Crane was elected MP for Sudbury in the Short Parliament and in November 1640 for the Long Parliament. He held the seat until his death in February 1643.

In 1618 Robert Ryece dedicated The Breviary of Suffolk to Robert Crane. The manuscript was preserved in the Harleian Collection until published in 1902 in an edition edited by Lord Francis Hervey as Suffolk in the XVII Century.

The baronetcy became extinct on Crane's death as he had no sons. He had married firstly Dorothy Hobart, daughter of Sir Henry Hobart, 1st Baronet Lord Chief Justice of the Court of Common Pleas, by whom he had no issue. He married secondly, Susan Alington, ?granddaughter of Sir Giles Alington of Horseheath and a great-granddaughter of Lord Burghley, chief minister of Elizabeth I. They had four daughters - Mary who married Sir Ralph Hare, 1st Baronet, Anne who married firstly Sir William Armine, 2nd Baronet, and secondly John Belasyse, 1st Baron Belasyse, Susan who married Sir Edward Walpole, and Katherine who married Edmund Bacon, nephew of Sir Robert Bacon, 3rd Baronet.

After Crane's death, Lady Crane married secondly, Isaac Appleton, esq. of Waldingfeld.

Parliament of England
Preceded by Sir Thomas Beckingham; Thomas Eden	Member of Parliament for Sudbury; 1614–1620; With: Henry Binge	Succeeded by Edward Osborne; Brampton Gurdon
Preceded by Thomas Jermyn; Sir Robert Gardener	Member of Parliament for Suffolk; 1621–1622; With: Thomas Clench	Succeeded by Sir William Spring; Sir Roger North
Preceded by Edward Osborne; Brampton Gurdon	Member of Parliament for Sudbury; 1624–1625; With: William Pooley; Sir Nathaniel Barnardiston	Succeeded by Sir Nathaniel Barnardiston; Thomas Smith
Preceded by Sir Edmund Bacon; Thomas Cornwallis	Member of Parliament for Suffolk; 1626; With: Sir Robert Naunton	Succeeded by Sir William Spring; Sir Nathaniel Barnardiston
Preceded by Sir Nathaniel Barnardiston; Thomas Smith	Member of Parliament for Sudbury; 1628–1629; With: William Pooley	Parliament suspended until 1640
Parliament suspended since 1629	Member of Parliament for Sudbury; 1640–1643; With: Richard Pepys 1640; Simonds d'Ewes 1640–1643	Succeeded by Simonds d'Ewes; Brampton Gurdon
Baronetage of England
New creation	Baronet (of Chilton); 1627–1643	Extinct
