= Thomas Jermyn (1573–1645) =

English courtier and Royalist (1573–1645)

The Right Honourable Sir Thomas Jermyn
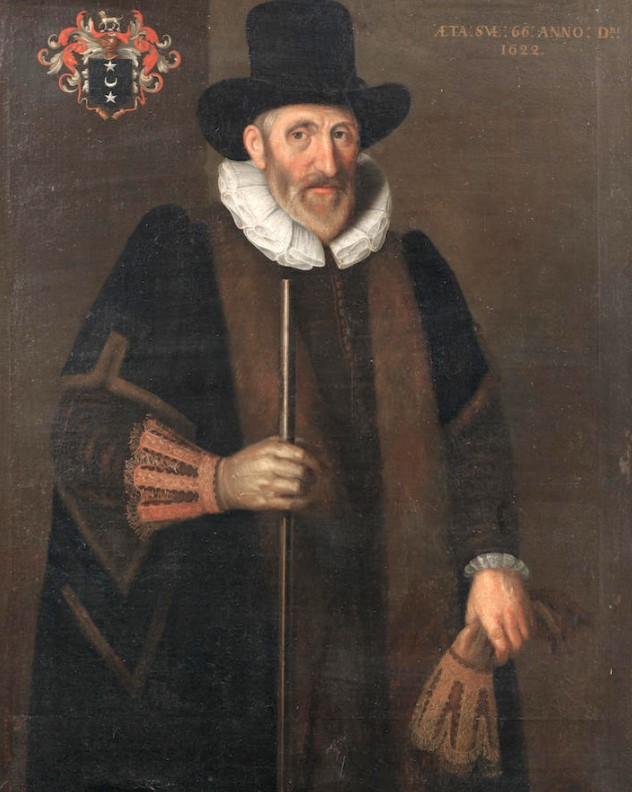
- A portrait of Thomas Jermyn in circa 1622

Comptroller of the Household
- In office 1639–1641
- Monarch: Charles I
- Preceded by: Henry Vane the Elder
- Succeeded by: Sir Peter Wyche

Personal details
- Born: 1573
- Died: 1645 (aged 71–72)
- Parent(s): Sir Robert Jermyn; Judith Blagge

Sir Thomas Jermyn (1573–1645) of Rushbrooke, Suffolk, was an English Royalist soldier and politician who was a Member of Parliament between 1604 and 1640. He became an influential courtier and served as Comptroller of the Household to Charles I from 1639 to 1641.

== Early life ==
Jermyn was the son of Sir Robert Jermyn of Rushbrooke Hall and Judith, daughter of Sir George Blagge. He was admitted at Emmanuel College, Cambridge in 1585 and entered the Middle Temple in 1590. From 1591 to 1592 he served as a volunteer in the French Wars of Religion, and fought in Henry IV's unsuccessful Siege of Rouen. He was knighted at Rouen on 27 September 1591 by the Earl of Essex. He continued to fight under Essex in the Anglo-Spanish War and was at the Capture of Cádiz in 1596.

In 1597 he participated in the Islands Voyage and then served in the Nine Years' War in Ireland. In January 1599 he raised a regiment of levies in Suffolk and became their colonel, taking the regiment to fight in Connaught by April. Despite his association with Essex, he avoided any involvement in Essex's Rebellion in 1601. In 1603 he was made a Knight of the Bath and appointed a gentleman of the privy chamber on the accession of James I.

== Political and court career ==
In 1604 Jermyn was elected as a Member of Parliament for Andover on the interest of Henry Wriothesley, 3rd Earl of Southampton, with whom he had served in Ireland. In the opening session of parliament he served in a committee to consider the union of England and Scotland. In 1607 he made a contribution to the recently established Virginia Company. He held the seat of Andover until 1611. In 1614 he was elected as an MP for the prestigious county seat of Suffolk. That same year he inherited his father's estates. He became a deputy lieutenant for Suffolk in 1615. Jermyn accompanied the diplomatic mission of Lord Hay to France in 1616. In 1617 he was appointed a justice of the peace for Suffolk.

He was elected for Bury St Edmunds, Suffolk, in the elections of 1621, 1623, 1625, 1626 and 1628. In 1623, Jermyn accompanied the Prince of Wales and Duke of Buckingham to Spain in an attempt to secure a Spanish marriage for the prince. The same year he was appointed a deputy lieutenant for Cambridgeshire. By 1624, Jermyn had become a vocal critic of Spanish policy and on 1 March he argued in the Commons that relations with Spain should be immediately severed. In 1626 he was on a parliamentary committee which considered Dudley Digges' proposal for a private enterprise war with Spain. Jermyn defended the Duke of Buckingham when parliament attempted to impeach him, and also spoke in defence of Buckingham's ally Dudley Carleton. In 1626–7 it was rumoured that Jermyn would be elevated to the peerage, but such a promotion never materialised.

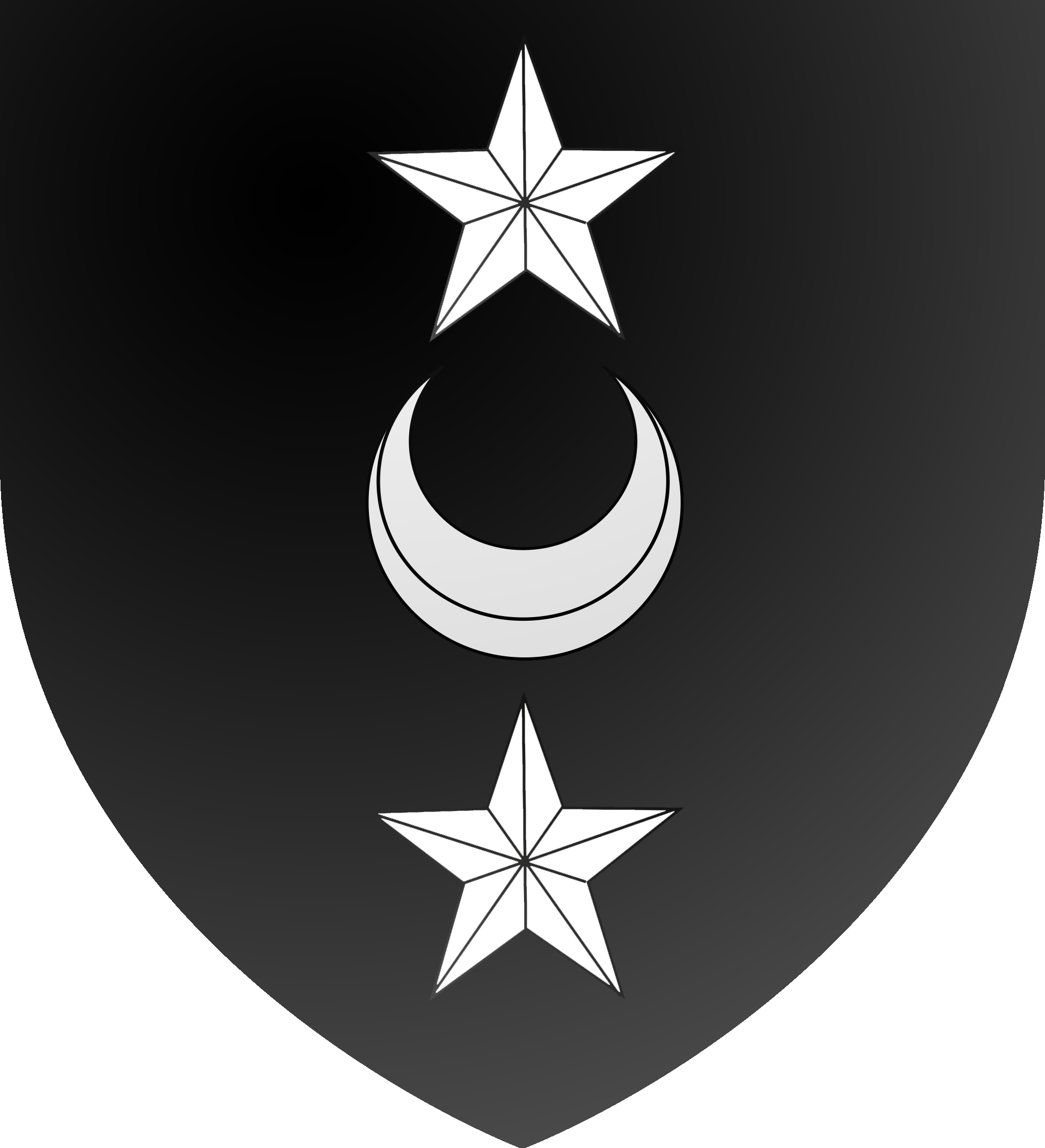
Blazon of Jermyn

In the 1628 parliament he voted consistently for the king's proposals and his attempts to raise additional taxes. Jermyn nonetheless supported the Petition of Right which was passed on 7 June 1628. Jermyn, however, also admonished John Eliot for criticising royal ministers. In the second session, at the grand committee on the customs administration on 23 February 1629, Jermyn sought to discriminate between the misdeeds of officials and the king's commands. In March 1629, Charles I decided to rule for eleven years without parliament and the Commons was dismissed.

By 1629, Jermyn was facing financial difficulties and sought a promotion at court. In 1630 he was made vice-chamberlain of the royal household and became a member of the Privy Council of England. On 22 December 1631 he became a non-resident Governor of Jersey and through the 1630s he sat on several administrative commissions. Jermyn was then appointed Comptroller of the Royal Household in 1639. In April 1640 Jermyn was re-elected for Bury St Edmunds in the Short Parliament, and a few months later was elected to the Long Parliament. He was made Lord Lieutenant of Suffolk the same year.

In 1641, he sold his position at court for £2,000 and left the Commons with the intent of retiring, only to be resummoned to parliament in August and November 1642 on suspicion of sending the king money to raise arms. In the ensuing Civil War he fought as a Royalist, becoming disabled through injury in 1644 and dying in the following year aged 72. He was buried at the church of St Nicholas, Rushbrooke on 7 January 1645. Having already made generous provision for his servants, he bequeathed all his disposable property to his second wife. His son Thomas inherited the estate and debts of over £3,300.

== Marriage and issue ==
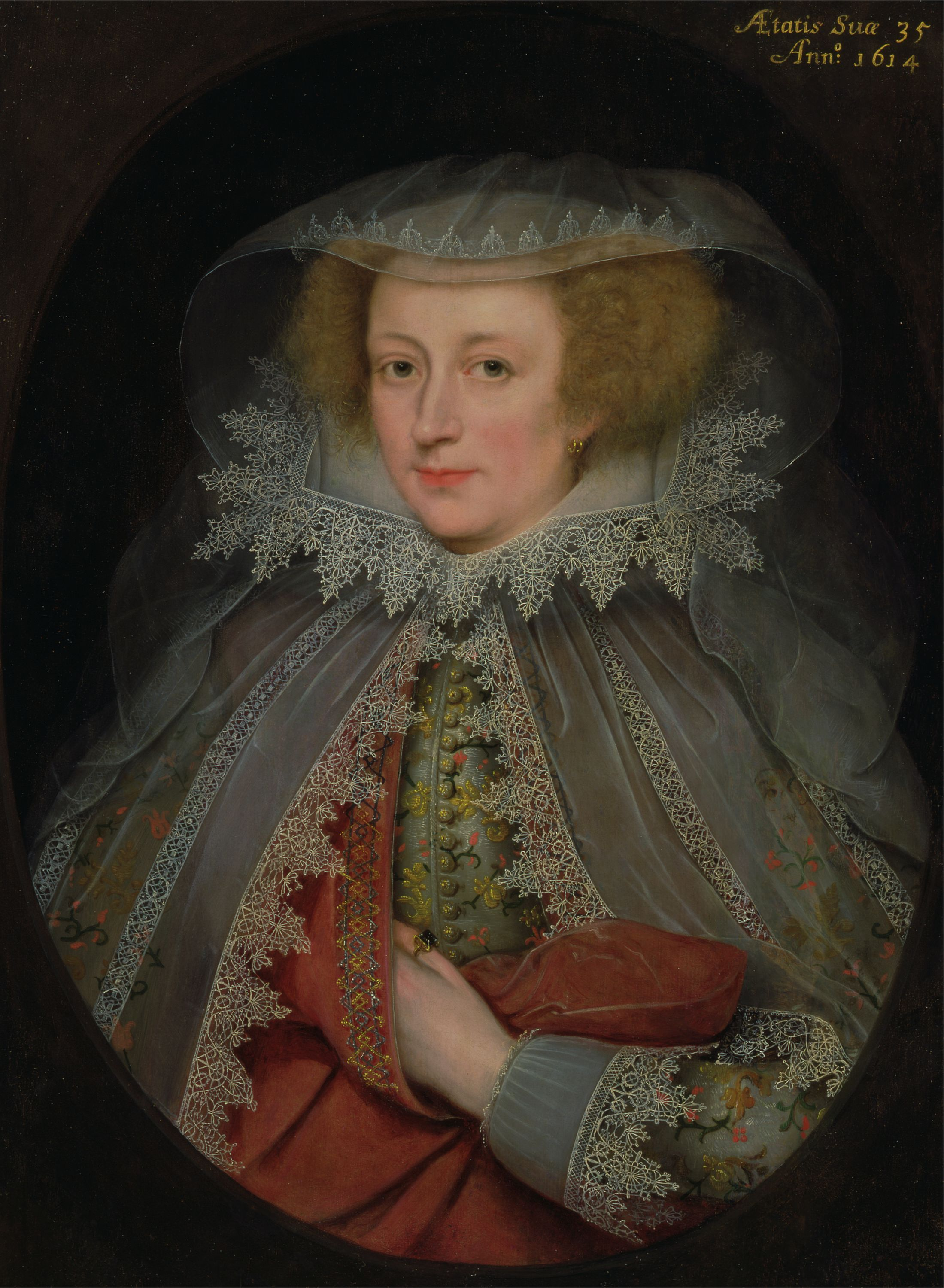
Catherine Killigrew, aged 35, first wife of Sir Thomas Jermyn. 1614 Portrait by Marcus Gheeraerts the Younger (1561–1636), Yale Center for British Art, Connecticut

On 26 November 1599, Jermyn married Catherine Killigrew (1579–1640), a daughter of Sir William Killigrew (died 1622) of Hanworth, Middlesex, a courtier to Elizabeth I and James VI and I, whom he served as Groom of the Privy Chamber. By his first wife he had four sons and one daughter. In 1605 their daughter, Elizabeth, died from eating a piece of bread baited with rat poison. The following children survived to adulthood:

- Robert Jermyn (1601–1623), MP for Penryn, predeceased his father;
- Thomas Jermyn (1604–1659), eldest surviving son, MP for Bury St Edmunds;
- Henry Jermyn, 1st Earl of St Albans (1605–1684), MP, courtier and Royalist.

On 17 March 1642, Jermyn married secondly Mary (died 1679), the daughter of Edmund Barber of Bury St Edmunds and widow of Thomas Newton of Norwich. The couple had one daughter, Elizabeth, who married Cyril Wyche and was the mother of Jermyn Wyche.

Parliament of England
Preceded by Henry Ludlow; Nicholas Hyde	Member of Parliament for Andover; 1604–1611; With: Thomas Antrobus	Succeeded by Richard Venables; Peter Noyes
Preceded by Sir John Heigham; Robert Drury	Member of Parliament for Suffolk; 1614; With: Sir Robert Gardiner	Succeeded by Sir Robert Crane, Bt; Thomas Clench
New constituency	Member of Parliament for Bury St Edmunds; 1621–1629; With: Josiah Woodford 1621; Anthony Crofts 1623; Sir William Spring 1625; Emanuel Gifford 1626; Sir William Hervey 1628–1629	Parliament suspended until 1640
Parliament suspended since 1629	Member of Parliament for Bury St Edmunds; 1640; With: John Godbolt 1640	Succeeded by Thomas Jermyn; Henry Jermyn
