= John Duncombe =

John Duncombe may refer to:

- John Duncombe (Bury St Edmunds MP) (1622–1687), English politician, Chancellor of the Exchequer
- John Duncombe (writer) (1729–1786), Church of England clergyman and writer
- John Duncombe (Yarmouth MP), represented Yarmouth (Isle of Wight) (UK Parliament constituency)
