= Edmund Poley (1619–1671) =

English Royalist and politician

Sir Edmund Poley (1619–1671) was an English Royalist and politician from Suffolk.

== Early life ==
Poley was eldest surviving son of Edmund Poley of Badley, Suffolk and his wife, Dorothy Warner. He was educated at Pembroke College, Cambridge, graduating with a BA in 1638. The same year he entered Gray's Inn. He succeeded to his father's estate in 1640. Between 1643 and 1646 he was a justice of the peace for the Suffolk. Poley fought as a Royalist during the English Civil War. He was knighted by Charles I at Oxford on 11 April 1646 and subsequently participated in the defence of the city during the Siege of Oxford. Following the Royalist defeat, in September 1646 he petitioned to compound on articles of surrender at Oxford, and was fined £728 by the Parliamentarians. He lived quietly in Suffolk during the Commonwealth of England until the Stuart Restoration in 1660.

== Political career ==
He was on the list of proposed Knights of the Royal Oak, with an income estimated at £1,000 per year in 1660. That year he was appointed a deputy lieutenant for Suffolk for life. In 1661 he was returned as the Member of Parliament for Bury St Edmunds on the interest of his father-in-law, Sir Henry Crofts. Poley was an active member of the Cavalier Parliament and was appointed to 169 committees.

He was recorded in the diary of Samuel Pepys as being among the "discontented Cavaliers that think their loyalty is not considered" and he aligned himself to the Earl of Arlington against the Earl of Clarendon. He was a reliable supporter of the court. In July 1667, he was authorised to act as receiver of revenue in Norfolk and Huntingdonshire and was given a post in customs in September. After the fall of Clarendon in 1667, Poley was appointed to the committees to inquire into the miscarriage of the Second Anglo-Dutch War and to inspect the militia laws. In 1668 he was granted £3,000 as royal bounty. He continued to represent Bury St Edmunds until his death in October 1671.

== Marriage and family ==
In 1651, Poley married Esther, daughter of Sir Henry Crofts. The couple had eight sons and seven daughters. Those who survived to adulthood were:

- William Poley (died 1672), died unmarried
- Henry Poley (5 January 1654 – 7 August 1707), politician, died unmarried
- Edmund Poley (14 December 1655 – 16 May 1714), diplomat, died unmarried
- Elizabeth Poley (died 11 November 1715), married Sir Richard Gipps (died 1681)
- Judith Poley (29 June 1654 – 1726), married Henry Jermyn, 1st Baron Dover (died 1708)
- Dorothy Poley (died 1680), died unmarried
- Cicely Poley (died 1679), died unmarried
- Anne Poley (died 1679), died unmarried

Parliament of England
Preceded by Henry Crofts; Sir John Duncombe	Member of Parliament for Bury St Edmunds; 1661–1671; With: Sir John Duncombe	Succeeded by William Duncombe; Sir John Duncombe
