= Edmund Poley =

Edmund Poley may refer to:

- Edmund Poley (1544–1613), member of the Parliament of England for Bodmin, 1572–1581, for Knaresborough, 1584 and for Clitheroe, 1586
- Edmund Poley (1619–1671), member of the Parliament of England for Bury St Edmunds, 1661–1671
- Edmund Poley (1655–1714), British diplomat and son of the above
