= Henry Goldwell =

Henry Goldwell was one of the two MPs for Bury St Edmunds between 1690 and 1694.
