= Joseph Hardcastle (politician) =

English politician

Joseph Alfred Hardcastle
- Born: 15 September 1815; Clapham, Surrey, England
- Died: 8 August 1899 (aged 83); Beaminster, Dorset, England
- Known for: Member of Parliament

Joseph Alfred Hardcastle (15 September 1815 – 8 August 1899) was an English Liberal politician who sat in the House of Commons variously between 1847 and 1885.

== Life ==
Hardcastle was born at Clapham, London, the son of Alfred Hardcastle of Hatcham House, New Cross (then in Surrey) and the grandson of Joseph Hardcastle. He was educated at Mill Hill School and the Grammar School at Bury St Edmunds. He studied at King's College, London, and matriculated at Wadham College, Oxford in June 1834, but transferred to Trinity College, Cambridge, being admitted in October 1834. He obtained a scholarship in 1836, and graduated B.A. (11th classic) in 1838 (promoted to M.A. in 1841). He was a Cambridge Apostle.

He was admitted to the Inner Temple in 1837, and called to the bar in 1841.

He was a Deputy Lieutenant for Surrey and a Justice of the Peace for Essex, Norfolk and Suffolk.

Hardcastle was elected at the 1847 general election as Member of Parliament (MP) for Colchester, but was defeated in 1852. At the 1857 general election he was elected for Bury St Edmunds, and held the seat until his defeat at the 1874 general election.

He was re-elected at the 1880 general election, but when the borough's representation was reduced to one seat for the 1885 general election, he was defeated by the Conservative candidate, and did not stand again.

Hardcastle died at Woodlands, Beaminster, Dorset at the age of 83.

== Family ==
Hardcastle married firstly Frances Lambirth, daughter of H. W. Lambirth of Writtle on 24 February 1840, and had issue, including Emma Winifred O'Malley. He married secondly Hon. Mary Scarlett Campbell, daughter of Lord Chancellor Campbell.

Parliament of the United Kingdom
Preceded by Richard Sanderson and Sir George Henry Smyth, Bt.	Member of Parliament for Colchester; 1847–1852; With: Sir George Henry Smyth to 1850; John Manners from 1850	Succeeded by John Manners and William Warwick Hawkins
Preceded by James Oakes and The Earl Jermyn	Member of Parliament for Bury St Edmunds; 1865–1874; With: The Earl Jermyn to 1859; Lord Alfred Hervey 1859–1865; Edward Greene from 1865	Succeeded by Edward Greene and Lord Francis Hervey
Preceded by Edward Greene and Lord Francis Hervey	Member of Parliament for Bury St Edmunds; 1880–1885; With: Edward Greene	Succeeded by Lord Francis Hervey
