= Anthony Crofts =

English politician

Anthony Crofts (c. 1593 – 1 October 1657) was an English politician who sat in the House of Commons in 1624.

Crofts was probably the son of Sir John Crofts of Little Saxham, Suffolk, and Toddington, Bedfordshire. He was admitted at Emmanuel College, Cambridge at Easter, 1611 and was admitted at Gray's Inn on 22 May 1612. In 1624, he was elected Member of Parliament for Bury St Edmunds.

Crofts died at the age of 63.

Parliament of England
Preceded by Sir Thomas Jermyn; Josiah Woodford	Member of Parliament for Bury St Edmunds; 1624; With: Sir Thomas Jermyn	Succeeded by Sir Thomas Jermyn; Sir William Spring
