= Richard Spring, Baron Risby =

British politician (born 1946)

The Right Honourable The Lord Risby
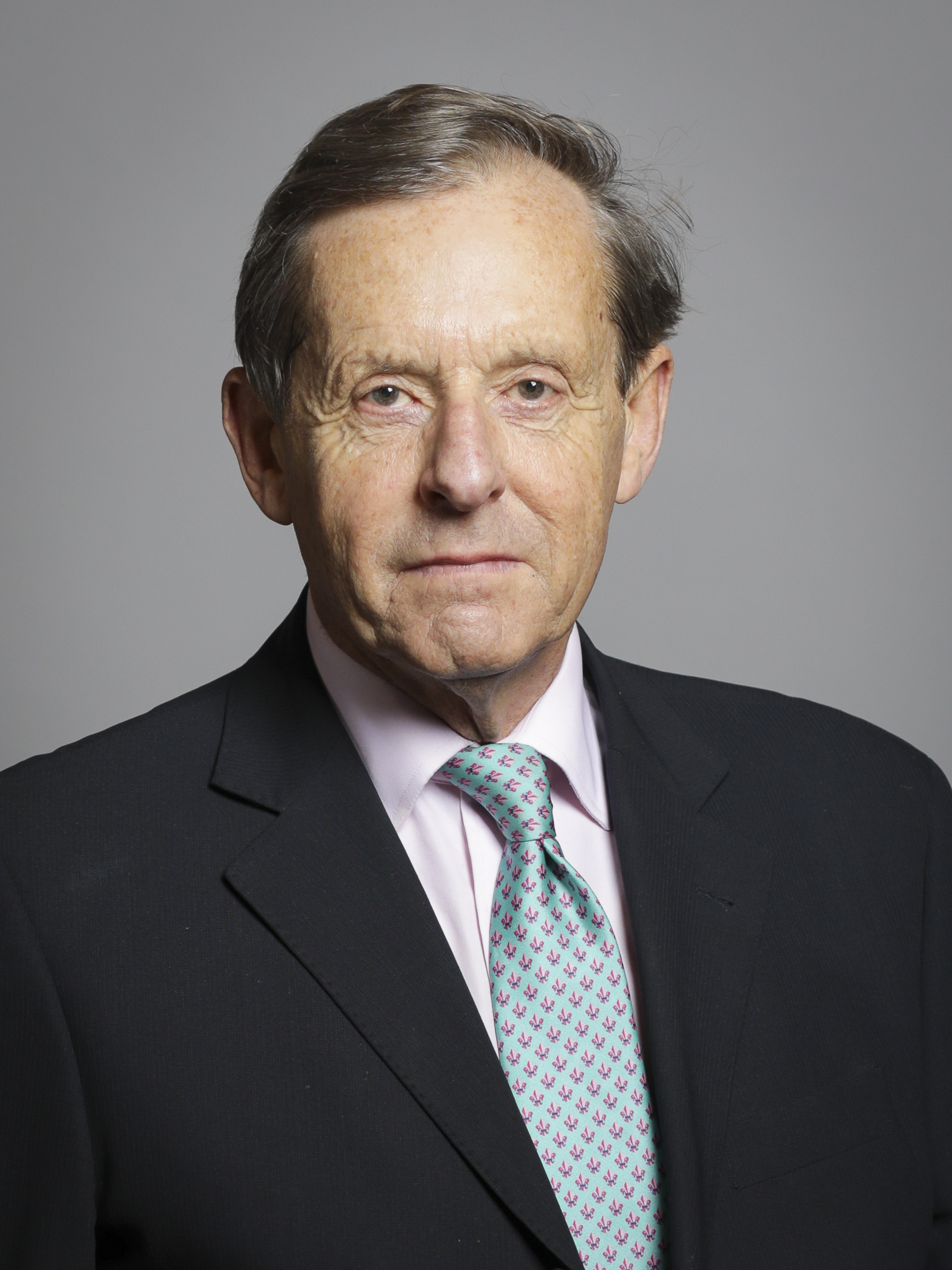

Member of the House of Lords
- Lord Temporal
- Life peerage 24 December 2010

Member of Parliament for West Suffolk
- In office 1 May 1997 – 12 April 2010
- Preceded by: new constituency
- Succeeded by: Matt Hancock

Member of Parliament for Bury St Edmunds
- In office 9 April 1992 – 8 April 1997
- Preceded by: Eldon Griffiths
- Succeeded by: David Ruffley

Personal details
- Born: 24 September 1946 (age 80) Cape Town, Union of South Africa
- Party: Conservative
- Spouse: Jane Henniker-Major (divorced)
- Education: University of Cape Town, Magdalene College, Cambridge
- Occupation: Politician

Richard John Grenville Spring, Baron Risby (born 24 September 1946) is a former Conservative Party politician in the United Kingdom. He served as Member of Parliament (MP) for Bury St Edmunds from 1992 to 1997, and for West Suffolk from 1997 to 2010. He joined the House of Lords in 2010.

== Biography ==
Spring was born into the prominent Spring family, in 1946 in Cape Town, South Africa where he attended Rondebosch and Cape Town University. He subsequently studied at Magdalene College, Cambridge. He married Hon. Jane Henniker-Major, daughter of John Henniker-Major, 8th Baron Henniker, in 1979. They divorced, having had two children.

== Career ==
=== Finance ===
Lord Risby has more than 20 years' experience in the financial sector. Following his graduation from Cambridge University, Spring started his career in the City. He joined Merrill Lynch in 1971 and was appointed as vice-president in 1976, a position which he held until 1986. He has furthermore worked with E F Hutton, Lehman Brothers and Furman Selz.

=== Parliament ===
Spring contested Ashton-under-Lyne at the 1983 general election. He was first elected as an MP at the 1992 General Election, representing Bury St Edmunds. Spring served as Parliamentary Private Secretary to Sir Patrick Mayhew as Secretary of State for Northern Ireland (1994–95).

Spring resigned from this position in 1995, after News of the World published a story detailing a sex encounter he had allegedly been involved in. The publication of the story was attacked as an example of paid entrapment, and on the grounds that it served no public interest. News of the World columnist Woodrow Wyatt, writing in The Times, stated that "[t]hat anyone is entitled to privacy in their homes, in their cups or in their beds is a wholly alien concept to the News of the World. The News of the World has as good as asked for a privacy law. The Government and Opposition should no longer hesitate to produce it". Even the News of the World's proprietor, Rupert Murdoch, privately criticised the story as "over the top". A fulsome and complete apology was subsequently received.

Spring's resignation was seen as a blow to John Major's Back to Basics campaign. Spring subsequently served as PPS to Tim Eggar as Minister for Trade and Industry (1995–96) and to Nicholas Soames and James Arbuthnot as Ministers of State at the Ministry of Defence (1996–97).

In 1997, Spring was elected as MP for West Suffolk. Between 1997 and 2000 he was Opposition spokesman for Culture, Media and Sport. He was Opposition Spokesman for Foreign Affairs between 2000 and 2004 and Shadow Minister for the Treasury between 2004 and 2005.

In 1995, in his constituency he founded a successful taskforce, including doctors, teachers, social workers, police and the racing industry, to deal with community social problems. After a visit by the Home Secretary it was included as a model in a government green paper.

On 23 November 2009, Spring announced that he would stand down at the 2010 general election.

He served as a Governor of the Westminster Foundation for Democracy from 2000 to 2009.

Between 2005 and 2010 he was a vice-chairman of the Conservative Party and vice-chairman of Conservative Business Relations. In 2005 he was appointed co-chairman of Conservative City Circle and in 2007 he founded Conservative City Future, of which he is Patron with Sir John Major.

He was also Director of the British Syrian Society between 2003 and 2011, and featured on a 2012 Dispatches programme on the Assad regime. He is honorary Vice Chairman of the Conservative Middle East Council.

On 24 December 2010, Spring was created a life peer as Baron Risby of Haverhill in the County of Suffolk. Lord Risby sits as a Conservative in the House of Lords.

From 2011 to 2015, Risby was the vice-chairman of the All-Party Parliamentary Group for East Asian Business. In November 2012, Lord Risby was announced as one of nine prime ministerial trade envoys, with responsibility for Algeria and, in 2019, Lebanon.

Lord Risby was on the EU External Affairs Committee in the Lords between 2015 and 2018. In 2020 to 2022 he was a member of the International Agreements Committee.

=== Other interests ===
In 1994, he chaired a parliamentary enquiry into the taxation of horseracing. Its recommendations were accepted by HM Treasury.

Risby is a Member of the All Party Parliamentary Group for Ukraine, a country which he has frequently visited. In his capacity as the Chairman of the British Ukrainian Society, he co-chaired the Scenarios for Ukraine programme for the World Economic Forum in Davos. Since May 2022 he has been on the Russian Government black list.

In November 2023, Risby initiated a parliamentary campaign to persuade the UK Government to declare the Ukrainian Holodomor as genocide. In April 2026, Lord Risby visited the National Holodomor Museum as part of a working visit to Kyiv and the Chernihiv region. In Chernihiv Lord Risby visited an educational and rehabilitation centre for children with visual impairments to donate a powerful battery charging station alongside the NGO Kent With Ukraine.

Risby is Vice Chairman of the All Party Parliamentary Group for Critical Minerals.

Risby has been a director of several businesses and organisations, including Hawkley Oil and Gas Ltd and Minexco Petroleum Inc, and was the president of the Association for Decentralised Energy. He is also the Deputy Chairman of the Small Business Bureau. Between 2016 and 2025, he was a Government appointed director the Horserace Betting Levy Board. Acknowledging his years of support for the equine industry he was granted lifetime access to racecourses across the UK.

In 2025 he was Patron of the extensive celebrations covering the 500th anniversary of St Peter and St Paul's Church, Lavenham. The Church, which was completed in 1525 was built by the Spring and de Vere families.

He was Patron of the London Magazine, is a Patron the Open Road charity, and is a member of the advisory board of the Council on Geostrategy, having been its first Chairman. He is Honorary President of the NGO Kent WIth Ukraine.

In 2007, he was nominated for a British Computer Society award for accessibility. In 2009, he was awarded the Parliamentary Award for Road Safety in recognition of his community campaigning.

Parliament of the United Kingdom
Preceded by Sir Eldon Griffiths	Member of Parliament for Bury St Edmunds; 1992 – 1997	Succeeded by David Ruffley
New constituency	Member of Parliament for West Suffolk; 1997 – 2010	Succeeded by Matt Hancock
Orders of precedence in the United Kingdom
Preceded by The Lord Lexden	Gentlemen; Baron Risby	Followed by The Lord Strasburger
