= David Ruffley =

British politician (born 1962)

Member of Parliament for Bury St Edmunds
- In office 1 May 1997 – 30 March 2015
- Preceded by: Richard Spring
- Succeeded by: Jo Churchill

Personal details
- Born: 18 April 1962 (age 64) Bolton, Greater Manchester, England
- Party: Conservative
- Education: Queens' College, Cambridge
- Occupation: Solicitor (1985–91); Special adviser (1991–96)
- Committees: Treasury Select Committee
- Website: davidruffleymp.com

David Laurie Ruffley (born 18 April 1962, Bolton) is a former Conservative Party politician in the United Kingdom. He was the Member of Parliament (MP) for the constituency of Bury St Edmunds in Suffolk, which encompasses Bury St Edmunds and Stowmarket, having first taken his seat at the 1997 general election.

A solicitor by profession, Ruffley served as special adviser to Ken Clarke (1991–96). He sat on the Treasury Select Committee from 1999 to 2004, on which he was an arch-critic of Gordon Brown, before becoming a whip in 2004. Ruffley served as Shadow Minister for Welfare Reform from 2005 to 2007 and Shadow Minister for Police Reform from 2007 to 2010. In 2010, he was unanimously re-elected to the Treasury Select Committee.

== Early life ==
Ruffley was born in Bolton, Lancashire. He went to the Bolton School (Boys' Division), an independent school in the town. He studied at Queens' College, Cambridge, receiving a BA in law in 1985. From 1985 to 1991, he worked for solicitors Clifford Chance in London. He was then a special adviser to Ken Clarke, first as Secretary of State for Education and Science (1991–92), then as Home Secretary (1992–93), and finally as Chancellor of the Exchequer (1993–96). From 1996 to 1997, he was an economic consultant to the Conservative Party and Vice President of the Small Business Bureau.

During this time, he was an adviser to the Grant Maintained Schools Foundation (1993–96), as well as governor of St Marylebone School (1992–94) and Pimlico School (1994–96). He would later be a governor of Bolton School (1997–99), which he had attended himself.

Ruffley sought selection for parliamentary seats, being beaten to selection in Harrogate and Knaresborough by Norman Lamont. After Richard Spring was selected to fight West Suffolk, selection for Spring's former seat of Bury St Edmunds with changed boundaries, was won by Ruffley. He won by a majority of 368 in 1997, increasing this at subsequent elections to 2,503, 9,930 and 12,380. In December 2013 he was reselected as the Bury St Edmunds Conservative parliamentary candidate for the 2015 election.

== Parliamentary career ==
=== Backbencher ===
Ruffley served on William Hague's campaign team in the 1997 party leadership election.

Ruffley was voted onto the powerful Treasury Select Committee in 1999. He remained on the committee until 2004, and criticised then-Chancellor Gordon Brown's handling of the economy, dubbing him 'Gambling Gordon' in 2002. He criticised Brown for hiding higher taxes by counting tax credits as a negative income tax, citing the OECD's classification of it as an increase in spending.

In the 2001 leadership election, Ruffley initially supported Michael Portillo, and publicly declared support for his former boss Ken Clarke after Portillo was knocked out in the final MPs' ballot. He voted against Iain Duncan Smith in 2003. In the leadership election that followed the vote of no confidence in Duncan Smith, Ruffley was variously described as being a 'likely supporter' of Michael Howard or a member of David Davis's 'wider [campaign] team'.

On his return to the backbenches, Ruffley resumed an active role in representing his constituents. He voted against equal marriage for same sex couples

=== Shadow Minister ===
With Howard as leader, Ruffley became a whip on 15 March 2004, after the resignation of David Curry.

In December 2005, he was appointed by David Cameron as the Shadow Minister for Welfare Reform.

In 2006, a group that included BBC Radio Suffolk and the East Anglian Daily Times saw the failure of their programme to get St Edmund named as the patron saint of England. Ruffley had taken up the cause and helped deliver a large petition to the government in London. Prime Minister Tony Blair rejected the request, but St Edmund was named patron saint of Suffolk.

From July 2007 to 2010, Ruffley was Shadow Minister for Police Reform replacing Nick Herbert MP. In 2008, he took charge of reducing the safety and health burden on police officers, and obtained figures showing police spent less than two-thirds of their time on patrol. He said that there was an 'emerging crisis of public confidence' in the Criminal Records Bureau (CRB), after 700 people were falsely accused of having criminal records in the year to February 2008, and highlighted the risk posed by CRB checks to work experience. He pledged to end police moonlighting, after it was discovered in January 2009 that 4,300 officers held second jobs. He campaigned against speed cameras being used to 'milk' motorists of £250,000 a day.

=== Expenses Scandal ===
During the United Kingdom Parliamentary Expenses Scandal it was revealed that Ruffley had claimed thousands in expenses for the furnishing of his properties, including £1,674 for a sofa and £2,175 for a television. He also claimed up to £17,000 per year under the Additional Costs Allowance system in order to pay the rent on one property and the mortgage on another. Additionally, he claimed expenses for moving between the two properties, as well as for household cleaning products, including scrubbing brushes and nearly £150 for anti-moth sachets.

=== Since 2010 ===
He was voted back onto the Treasury Select Committee in November 2010, replacing David Rutley.

On the select committee, Ruffley has opposed the Payments Council's plans to withdraw personal cheques by 2018, saying that it 'scared the pants off Middle England', accusing the Council of 'rank incompetence', and calling for the council's chairman to resign. He has also criticised the withdrawal of cheque guarantee cards in July 2011, saying that the public were not given sufficient warning.

In January 2011 Ruffley interrogated bankers appearing before the select committee, including Barclays' chief executive Bob Diamond, whom Ruffley asked whether he was "grateful to the British taxpayer" for the estimated £100bn of benefit of the 2008 United Kingdom bank rescue package to the wider banking system. Ruffley has opposed the Liberal Democrats' plan to give the government's shares in the partly nationalised Lloyds and RBS to each of the 46 million people on the electoral roll, and called instead for them to be sold to raise money for a cut in the basic rate of income tax.

In July 2011, Ruffley supported Sajid Javid's private member's bill to limit government debt to 40% of gross domestic product.

He voted against the Cameron–Clegg coalition government in 2013 on the issue of British military intervention in the Syrian civil war.

On 24 July 2014, it was reported that Ruffley was under investigation by the Conservatives' Chief Whip, Michael Gove, with the possibility that disciplinary measures may be taken against him. This follows his police caution from the Metropolitan Police for Ruffley's common assault of his former partner.

On 28 July 2014 he announced that he would stand down at the 2015 general election as a result of the "protracted media debate" regarding his future as an MP, because he believed it would not "serve the interests" of the Conservative Party. In November 2014 Jo Churchill was selected as the Conservative PPC for the constituency

== Personal life ==
On 17 June 2010, Ruffley suffered minor injuries after jumping into the path of an oncoming train at Victoria Station, London. He missed the live rail and the train safely passed over him, inflicting only cuts and bruises. The police treated the incident as "non-suspicious". Ruffley was reported to have been suffering from depression at the time and was granted sick leave to recover. He returned to work in October 2010. In March 2016 Ruffley was reported to have been convicted for drink-driving following his arrest on 27 January when he was found slumped over the wheel of his car following a crash in Page Street, Westminster. He was reported to be nearly three times over the legal limit and received a two-year ban and ordered to do 80 hours of unpaid community service.

Parliament of the United Kingdom
Preceded by Richard Spring	Member of Parliament for Bury St Edmunds; 1997–2015	Succeeded by Jo Churchill
