= Richard Pepys =

English lawyer and politician (1589–1659)

- Born: 2 July 1589
- Died: 2 January 1659 (aged 69)

Sir Richard Pepys (2 July 1589 – 2 January 1659) was an English lawyer and politician who sat in the House of Commons in 1640 and was Lord Chief Justice of Ireland. He was a first cousin one removed of Samuel Pepys, the diarist (Pepys Diary 26 April 1664).

Pepys was born at Bunstead, Essex, the son of John Pepys of Cottenham, Cambridgeshire and his wife Elizabeth Bendish, daughter of John Bendish of Bowes Hall, Essex. He entered Middle Temple in 1609 and was called to the bar in 1617. He was a bencher of his inn in 1636 and acted as reader in 1640.

In April 1640, Pepys was elected Member of Parliament for Sudbury in the Short Parliament. He was active in local government, attending meetings of the County Committee for Suffolk between 1642 and 1648. He acted as treasurer of the Middle Temple in 1648. He was appointed Baron of the Exchequer on 30 May 1654 and became Serjeant-at-Law at the same time. He was appointed Chief Justice of Ireland in 1654 between 22 August and 3 November. He sat in court with Miles Corbet on occasion and was also appointed chief justice of the Upper Bench and commissioner of the great seal in 1655. He was on the circuit in Ulster in early 1657. In 1658, he presented books to the Inner Temple. He died suddenly in 1659 and was buried in Christ Church Cathedral, Dublin.

Pepys married firstly Judith Cutte, daughter of Sir William Cutte of Arkesden, in 1620. He married secondly Mary Gosnold, daughter of Bartholomew Gosnold, who played a major part in the establishment of Virginia along with his wife, Mary Goldinge. He had three sons and three daughters and was an ancestor of the Earl of Cottenham. From the Diary of Samuel Pepys, it is known that the great diarist, Richard's first cousin once removed, was on friendly terms with at least one of his sons, also called Samuel, and two of his daughters, Elizabeth Strudwick and Judith Scott, who died in 1664. Pepys grieved at the death of Judith, "a good woman", more so since like so many of the Pepys family of their generation, she was childless: "it is a sad consideration how the Pepyses do decay."

Parliament of England
Vacant Parliament suspended since 1629 Title last held by Sir Robert Crane; Sir William Pooley	Member of Parliament for Sudbury; 1640; With: Sir Robert Crane, 1st Baronet	Succeeded by Simonds d'Ewes; Sir Robert Crane, 1st Baronet
Legal offices
Vacant Title last held by Sir George Shurley	Lord Chief Justice of Ireland; 1654–1659	Succeeded by John Santhey
