= Henry Cadogan, Viscount Chelsea =

British Army officer, civil servant and politician

Viscount Chelsea DL
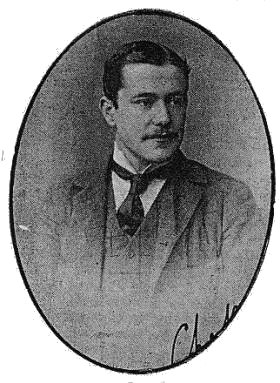

Personal details
- Born: Henry Arthur Cadogan; 13 June 1868 London
- Died: 2 July 1908 (aged 40) Theobalds House, Hertfordshire
- Cause of death: cancer
- Resting place: Culford, Suffolk
- Party: Conservative
- Spouse: Mildred Sturt (m. 1892)
- Relations: Edward Cadogan (brother); Gerald Cadogan (brother); William Cadogan (brother); Alexander Cadogan (brother); William Brownlow (brother-in-law); Samuel Scott (brother-in-law); 2nd Earl Craven (maternal grandfather)
- Children: Sibyl Stanley, Lady Stanley; Edith Mills, Baroness Hillingdon; Cynthia, Lady de Trafford; Mary Spencer-Churchill, Duchess of Marlborough; Victoria, Lady Gilmour; Edward Cadogan, Viscount Chelsea
- Parents: George Cadogan, 5th Earl Cadogan (father); Lady Beatrix Craven (mother)
- Education: Eton College
- Alma mater: Trinity College, Cambridge
- Profession: Army officer, civil servant, politician

Henry Arthur Cadogan, Viscount Chelsea, DL (born Henry Arthur Cadogan; 13 June 1868 – 2 July 1908) was a British Army officer, civil servant and politician.

This Viscount Chelsea (the title is a courtesy title) was a Conservative Member of the House of Commons (MP) elected twice to the seat of Bury St Edmunds. He was previously a captain in the 3rd Battalion of the Royal Fusiliers and a civil servant to the Prime Minister. His father was a major developer of part of Kensington and Chelsea and represented the Crown in Ireland. Henry became his expectant heir from the age of 10 but had no sons who survived childhood and he predeceased his father at the age of 40.

His wife, Cecilia Mildred Harriet Sturt, had a less notable career than Henry. She suffered the loss of her husband and two years later, that of their only son but that year married again and being widowed again, married youngest son of the Duke of Manchester.

== Background ==
Lord Chelsea was the second son of the 5th Earl Cadogan and his first wife, née Lady Beatrix Craven. On 2 August 1878, his older brother died at the age of twelve, so at the age of ten he became the heir to his father's peerage and acquired the courtesy title Viscount Chelsea (originally granted in 1800 in acknowledgment of the family's inheritance of the manor of Chelsea). His father later was appointed to the Privy Council of the United Kingdom and became Lord Lieutenant of Ireland (1895–1902).

== Careers ==
Lord Chelsea had three careers, that of a captain in the 3rd Battalion of the Royal Fusiliers, that of Private Secretary to a Prime Minister (at the time, officially termed the First Lord of the Treasury) and that of an MP for the eight years from his election in 1892.

In 1892 he was elected (as Member of Parliament) for Bury St Edmunds. In February 1904, he was appointed a deputy lieutenant of the County of London.

== Marriage and family ==
On 30 April 1892, he married Mildred Cecilia Harriet Sturt (1867–1942), a daughter of politician Lord Alington, at Holy Trinity, Sloane Street, Chelsea and they had six children:

- Sibyl Louise Beatrix (1893–1969), married Lord Stanley.
- Edith Mary Winifred (1895–1969), married the 3rd Baron Hillingdon.
- Cynthia Hilda Evelyn (1896–1966), married Sir Humphrey de Trafford, 4th Baronet.
- Alexandra Mary (1900–1961), married the 10th Duke of Marlborough.
- Victoria Laura (1901–1991), married Sir John Gilmour, 2nd Baronet, of Craigmillar.
- Edward George John Humphrey, briefly Viscount Chelsea (1903–1910); a godson of Edward VII and George, Prince of Wales.

His own death from cancer at age 40 at Temple House, Theobalds Park, Hertfordshire, preceded the death of his only son in childhood illness.

Two years after his death, in 1910, his wife married Hedworth Lambton (later Meux) (a son of the 2nd Earl of Durham); in 1930 she married Lord Charles Montagu (a son of the 7th Duke of Manchester).

Parliament of the United Kingdom
Preceded by Lord Francis Hervey	Member of Parliament for Bury St Edmunds; 1892–1900	Succeeded by Sir Edward Greene
