= William Spring of Pakenham =

Sir William Spring of Pakenham (29 July 1588 – 2 March 1638) was a Suffolk gentry politician who sat in the House of Commons at various times between 1623 and 1629.

== Biography ==
He was the son of John Spring (d.1601) and his wife Mary (or Anne) Trelawney. He was the grandson of Sir William Spring of Lavenham and his first wife Anne Kitson, and of John Trelawney of Menheniot, Cornwall and his wife Anne Reskymer. His stepfather was Sir Robert Gardiner, Lord Chief Justice of Ireland (died 1620). He was educated at Emmanuel College, Cambridge, graduating in 1603, followed by Middle Temple until 1606. At university, Spring became a close friend of another student from Suffolk, John Winthrop, with whom he would correspond for the rest of his life.

He served as High Sheriff of Suffolk and was knighted by James I on 12 February 1611. He served his second term as High Sheriff in 1621. He was first elected as Member of Parliament for Suffolk in 1623. Whilst in London for the 1624 meeting of Parliament, Spring kept a diary of proceedings in the House of Commons, which is now a valuable record of the time. He was elected to serve as the MP for Bury St Edmunds in 1625. Spring had been brought up as a Puritan by his stepfather, Sir Robert Gardiner, and was involved in several Parliamentary commissions regarding the Roman Catholic faith in England, such as a commission of "inquiry into popish schoolmasters". He was initially reluctant to stand for Parliament in the 1628 elections due to poor health, but was convinced by Sir Edward Coke and was returned as the MP for Suffolk. Spring was appointed to a bill committee concerning the neglect of preaching and catechizing, and sat on a committee of inquiry into electoral irregularities in Cornwall. He left no trace on the records of the Commons' brief 1629 session. Spring was a Justice of the Peace in Suffolk between 1618 and his death, and held numerous other local offices such as Commissioner for Piracy (1627) and Commissioner for Trade (1625). During the 1630s, Spring used his large fortune to found two lectureships at the University of Cambridge. However, they were opposed by the Laudian bishop and Vice-Chancellor of the university, Matthew Wren, who subsequently closed down both of them.

Sir William died in 1638 at Ridenhall, and was buried at Pakenham. He had married Elizabeth Smith, daughter of Sir William Smith, in 1610, with whom he had nine children. He was succeeded by his son, William, who was made a baronet by Charles I.

Political offices
Preceded by Thomas Crofts	High Sheriff of Suffolk; 1596	Succeeded by Thomas Eden (died 1614)
Preceded by Sir Robert Crane, 1st Baronet; Thomas Clench	Member of Parliament for Suffolk; 1624; With: Sir Roger North	Succeeded by Sir Edmund Bacon, 2nd Baronet; Thomas Cornwallis (died 1627)
Preceded by Thomas Jermyn; Anthony Crofts	Member of Parliament for Bury St Edmunds; 1625; With: Thomas Jermyn	Succeeded by Thomas Jermyn; Emanuel Gifford
Preceded by Robert Naunton; Sir Robert Crane, 1st Baronet	Member of Parliament for Suffolk; 1628; With: Sir Nathaniel Barnardiston	Parliament suspended until 1640
