= Godbolt =

Godbolt is a surname. Notable people with the surname include:

- A. J. Godbolt (born 1984), American soccer player
- Matt Godbolt (born 1976), English computer scientist and programmer
- Jim Godbolt (1922–2013), English jazz writer and historian
- John Godbolt (c. 1582–1648), English judge and politician
