= William Croft (disambiguation) =

William Croft was a musician.

William Croft may also refer to:

- William Croft (linguist)
- William Denman Croft, British Army officer
- Sir William Croft (civil servant), English civil servant
- William Croft (MP) for Launceston (UK Parliament constituency)
- William Croft (Canadian politician) in Toronto municipal election, 1939

== See also ==
- William Crofts (disambiguation)
