= 1925 Bury St Edmunds by-election =

UK Parliamentary by-election

The 1925 Bury St Edmunds by-election was held when the sitting MP for Bury St Edmunds, Walter Guinness was nominated as Minister of Agriculture in 1925. A by-election was required under the electoral law of the time, which he won.

Bury St Edmunds by-election, 1925 Electorate 30,544
Party	Candidate	Votes	%	±%
Unionist	Walter Guinness	14,700	62.8	−0.3
Liberal	George Nicholls	8,703	37.2	+0.3
Majority		5,997	25.6	−0.6
Turnout		23,403	73.9	−7.9
Conservative hold		Swing	-0.3	
