= Frank Heilgers =

British politician

Lieutenant-Colonel Frank Frederick Alexander Heilgers (25 June 1892 – 16 January 1944) was a British Conservative Party Member of Parliament (MP) who was killed in a train crash during World War II. He fought in World War I in Gallipoli, Egypt and Palestine, earning a mentioned in dispatches. He was also a Royal Artillery officer.

== Early life and education ==
Heilgers was from Bardwell in Suffolk and was educated at Magdalen College, Oxford.

== Work ==
Heilgers was elected as MP for Bury St Edmunds at the 1931 general election. He was Parliamentary Private Secretary to the Minister of Agriculture from 1935 to 1936, to the Minister of Pensions from 1937 to 1940, and the First Commissioner of Works in 1939–40. He was awarded the Silver Medal of the RSPCA for promoting the passage of the Riding Establishment Act into Law, 1939.

He was made a JP for the county of Suffolk in 1923, and was an Alderman of West Suffolk County Council. He farmed over 1,000 acres in the county and was a breeder of British Friesian cattle and Large Black pigs. He was recalled to the army on the outbreak of World War II in 1939 and served on the staff at home as Deputy Assistant Quartermaster General to 11 Corps in 1940 and at the War Office in 1942.

Heilgers was killed, aged 51, in the 1944 Ilford rail crash. He was laid to rest in Bardwell churchyard.

Parliament of the United Kingdom
Preceded by Walter Guinness	Member for Bury St Edmunds; 1931 – 1944	Succeeded by Edgar Mayne Keatinge
