= Lord Francis Hervey =

Lord Francis Hervey (16 October 1846 – 10 January 1931) was a British barrister and Conservative politician who sat in the House of Commons in two periods between 1874 and 1892.

== Background ==
Hervey was the fourth and youngest son of Frederick Hervey, 2nd Marquess of Bristol and his wife Lady Katherine Isabella Manners, fourth daughter of John Manners, 5th Duke of Rutland. His older brothers were Frederick Hervey, 3rd Marquess of Bristol, Lord Augustus Hervey and Lord John Hervey. He was educated at Eton College, where he won the Newcastle Scholarship, and later Balliol College, Oxford, where he graduated with a Bachelor of Arts in 1869. Hervey was called to the bar by Lincoln's Inn in 1872 and was nominated an Honorary Fellow of Hertford College, Oxford two years later.

== Career ==
At the 1874 general election Hervey was elected Member of Parliament for Bury St Edmunds and held the seat until 1880. He was elected for the constituency again in 1885 and sat for it until 1892. In the latter year, he was appointed Second Civil Service Commissioner, an office he held until 1907, when he was promoted to First Civil Service Commissioner. Hervey retired from this post in 1909 and maintaining the family's connections with Brighton College, he served as a member of its Council from 1910 to his death. He secured the school a 35-year lease on 8.5 acres (3.4 ha) of the family's Manor Farm property to serve as playing fields. Hervey was Justice of Peace for Suffolk.

Parliament of the United Kingdom
| Preceded by Joseph Hardcastle; Edward Greene | Member of Parliament for Bury St Edmunds; 1874–1880; With: Edward Greene | Succeeded by Joseph Hardcastle; Edward Greene |
| Preceded by Joseph Hardcastle; Edward Greene | Member of Parliament for Bury St Edmunds; 2-seat constituency until 1885; 1885–1892 | Succeeded by Viscount Chelsea |
Government offices
| Preceded by William John Courthope | First Civil Service Commissioner; 1907–1909 | Succeeded by Sir Stanley Mordaunt Leathes |
