= Emanuel Gifford =

English politician

Emanuel Gifford (died c 1633) was an English politician who sat in the House of Commons twice between 1621 and 1626.

Gifford was the son of Anthony Gifford, of Milton Damerell, Devon. He was possibly at Peterhouse, Cambridge in 1599 or 1600. He was awarded MA at Cambridge University and was incorporated at Oxford University on 30 August 1605. In 1621, he was elected Member of Parliament for Rye. He was elected MP for Bury St Edmunds in 1626.

Gifford probably died in 1633 as his will was proved in December of that year.

Parliament of England
Preceded by Edward Hendon; Thomas Watson	Member of Parliament for Rye; 1621–1622; With: John Angell	Succeeded by Thomas Conway; Sir Edward Conway
Preceded by Sir Thomas Jermyn; Sir William Spring	Member of Parliament for Bury St Edmunds; 1626; With: Sir Thomas Jermyn	Succeeded by Sir Thomas Jermyn; Sir William Hervey
