= 1892 Bury St Edmunds by-election =

UK parliamentary by-election

The 1892 Bury St Edmunds by-election was fought when the previous Conservative MP, Lord Francis Hervey resigned to become the Second Civil Service Commissioner. It was won by the unopposed Conservative candidate, Henry Cadogan.

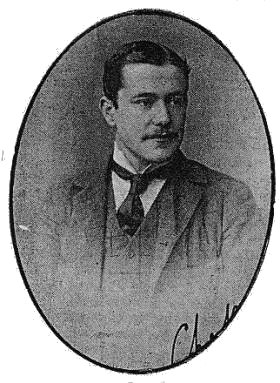
Cadogan

1892 Bury St Edmunds by-election
Party	Candidate	Votes	%	±%
Conservative	Henry Cadogan	Unopposed		
Conservative hold				
