= Frederick Hervey, 2nd Marquess of Bristol =

British politician

The Most Honourable The Marquess of Bristol PC FSA
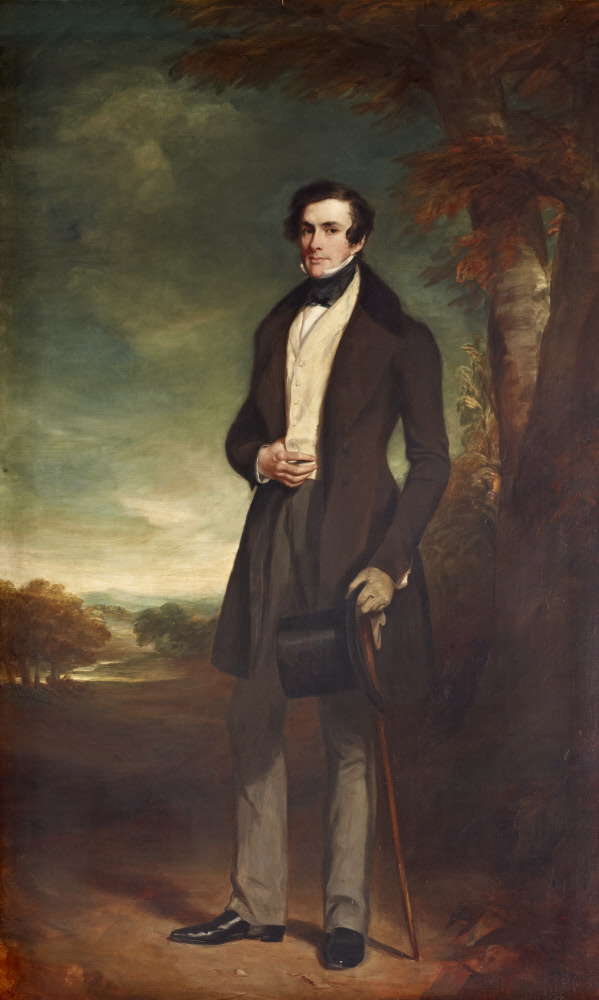
- Portrait by Francis Grant, 1839

Treasurer of the Household
- In office 9 September 1841 – 29 June 1846
- Monarch: Victoria
- Prime Minister: Sir Robert Peel, Bt
- Preceded by: George Byng
- Succeeded by: Lord Robert Grosvenor

Personal details
- Born: 15 July 1800 Portland Place, Marylebone, London
- Died: 30 October 1864 (aged 64) Ickworth House, Suffolk
- Party: Tory
- Spouse: Lady Katherine Manners (1809–1848)
- Children: 7, including Frederick, Augustus, and Francis
- Parent(s): Frederick Hervey, 1st Marquess of Bristol; Elizabeth Albana
- Education: Trinity College, Cambridge

Frederick William Hervey, 2nd Marquess of Bristol PC, FSA (15 July 1800 – 30 October 1864), styled Lord Hervey from 1803 to 1826 and Earl Jermyn from 1826 to 1859, was a British Tory politician. He served as Treasurer of the Household under Sir Robert Peel between 1841 and 1846.

== Background and education ==
Hervey was born at Portland Place, Marylebone, London, the eldest son of Frederick Hervey, 1st Marquess of Bristol, and his wife the Honourable Elizabeth Albana Upton, daughter of Clotworthy Upton, 1st Baron Templetown. Lord Arthur Hervey was his younger brother. He was educated at Eton and Trinity College, Cambridge.

== Political career ==
Styled Earl Jermyn after his father was raised to a marquessate in 1826, he became a member of Parliament as one of two representatives for Bury St Edmunds the same year. In 1841 he was sworn of the Privy Council and appointed Treasurer of the Household in the Tory administration of Sir Robert Peel, an office he retained until the government fell in 1846. He continued to represent Bury St Edmunds in Parliament until 1859, when he succeeded his father in the marquessate and entered the House of Lords.

He was appointed Colonel of the disembodied West Suffolk Militia on 25 March 1846. When the Militia was revived in 1853 he commanded the regiment at its first annual training at Bury St Edmunds. However, the appointment of colonel in the militia had been abolished, and Jermyn resigned on 3 August 1855, becoming the regiment's first Honorary Colonel.

Apart from his political career he was also a Fellow of the Society of Antiquaries.

== Family ==
Lord Bristol married Lady Katherine Isabella Manners, daughter of John Manners, 5th Duke of Rutland, in 1830. They had four sons and three daughters:

- Hon. Elizabeth Frederica Hervey (1832? – 1 June 1856)
- Lady Mary Katharine Isabella Hervey (1833? – 1 August 1928)
- Frederick William John Hervey, 3rd Marquess of Bristol (28 June 1834 – 7 August 1907)
- Lord Augustus Henry Charles Hervey (2 August 1837 – 28 May 1875)
- Major Lord John William Nicholas Hervey (15 November 1841 – 25 February 1902)
- Lady Adeliza Georgiana Hervey (17 August 1843 – 7 November 1911) - Richard Trench, 4th Earl of Clancarty
- Lord Francis Hervey (16 October 1846 – 10 January 1931)

Countess Jermyn died at 47 Eaton Place, London, on 20 April 1848, from smallpox, in a childbed, aged 39. Lord Bristol remained a widower until his death at Ickworth House, Suffolk, on 30 October 1864, aged 64. He was succeeded in the marquessate by his eldest son, Frederick.

Parliament of the United Kingdom
Preceded by Arthur Upton; Lord John FitzRoy	Member of Parliament for Bury St Edmunds; 1826–1859; With: Earl of Euston 1826–1831; Charles Augustus Fitzroy 1831–1832; Lord Charles FitzRoy 1832–1847; Edward Bunbury 1847–1852; John Stuart 1852; James Oakes 1852–1857; Joseph Hardcastle 1857–1859	Succeeded by Joseph Hardcastle; Lord Alfred Hervey
Political offices
Preceded by George Byng	Treasurer of the Household; 1841–1846	Succeeded by Lord Robert Grosvenor
Peerage of the United Kingdom
Preceded by Frederick Hervey	Marquess of Bristol; 1859–1864	Succeeded by Frederick Hervey
