= Robert Gardiner (judge) =

English-born Irish judge

Sir Robert Gardiner (1540 – 1620) was an English-born judge in Ireland who held the office of Lord Chief Justice of Ireland for eighteen years. In addition to his judicial duties, he was a trusted political adviser to both Elizabeth I and James I. He sat in the English House of Commons in the short-lived Addled Parliament of 1614.

== Early career ==
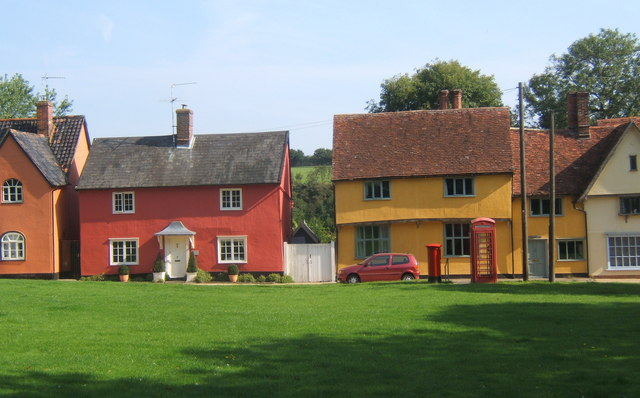
Hartest, Suffolk, present day

He was the son of William Gardiner, a substantial yeoman farmer who held lands at Hartest and Shimpling in Suffolk, and his wife Alice, widow of a Mr Ling. Born in 1540, he determined on a career in the law, although the estate he inherited from his father, who died before 1568, was large enough to live on in comfort. He entered Lincoln's Inn in 1562 and was Reader of the Inn in 1585. He was called to the Bar in 1570. There is reason to think that his practice was not particularly large: Chief Justice Wray, in recommending him for promotion to the Irish Bench, admitted that he "was not so much occupied as diverse others of smaller learning".

== Irish career ==
Queen Elizabeth, who despite their occasional quarrels, had great trust in Gardiner, sent him to Ireland as Lord Chief Justice in 1586 with exceptional powers to review the operation of the Courts of Common Law. Crawford states that he had "a mandate to reform both courts and administration", but it does not seem that he had much success in this mission. His appointment was strongly endorsed by Sir Christopher Wray, his counterpart as English Lord Chief Justice, who described him as "learned, wise, of good discretion and courage".

Irish politics at the time was dominated by the feud between the Lord Deputy of Ireland, Sir John Perrot, and his opponents, who were led by Adam Loftus, the Archbishop of Dublin. Gardiner took Loftus' side and worked for Perrot's recall. He was appointed one of the judicial commissioners to deal with the aftermath of the Desmond Rebellion in 1588: its proceedings caused a good deal of criticism on the grounds of bias, as virtually all claims were decided in the Crown's favour. During the Nine Years War he negotiated with the leader of the Rebellion, Hugh O'Neill in 1594 and 1596, leading to a serious quarrel with the Queen and his temporary disgrace. He served as Lord Justice of Ireland in 1597. He fought against Hugh O'Neill in 1598 and against the Spanish Army at Kinsale in 1601-2.

The Queen and Gardiner quarrelled in 1596/7, apparently over the humiliating peace terms which he agreed with the "arch-rebel" Hugh O'Neill, 2nd Earl of Tyrone, which in the Queen's view amounted to a virtual abdication of English rule in Ireland. He was in temporary disgrace as a result, and pleaded, not for the first or last time, for leave to resign. Nonetheless she retained great confidence in Gardiner, and knighted him in 1591. He seems to have been considered irreplaceable by each successive Lord Deputy of Ireland, who ignored his constant pleas, from early in his career in Ireland, to be allowed to retire on health grounds: "we find such sincerity, constancy and sincerity in him".Like some (though by no means all) English settlers in Ireland, he disliked the damp Irish climate and believed that it was damaging his health. In addition, his judicial duties were so heavy- for a time he was effectively in charge of three of the four Irish High Courts- that in 1592 Sir William FitzWilliam, the Lord Deputy, while refusing to allow him to retire, as he was too "wise, prudent and useful" to be spared, voiced concerns about the burden he was carrying. In 1603 he was finally permitted to retire.

== Later years ==
He resolved to live a peaceful private existence, but his public career was by no means over, since the new King James I found him as dependable a royal servant as Queen Elizabeth had. He was entrusted with the reform of the governments of Jersey and Guernsey in 1604-5, and was at Court advising on Irish affairs in 1607 and again in 1613-14; he was prominent in local government as late as 1609.

In 1614, rather unexpectedly given his advanced age, he entered the House of Commons as member for Suffolk. It is possible that his continued employment by the Crown prompted him to seek a role in Government. He was diligent in attendance, and spoke several times, but the so-called Addled Parliament of 1614 was completely ineffective and was dissolved after only two months.

In his last years, he founded almshouses at Elmswell, where he was lord of the manor, having purchased the estate from the Darcy family, for the care of six poor women, three from Elmswell and three from nearby Woolpit, where he also held the manor. The charity still exists. Through his marriage into the Spring family, he held for his lifetime the manor of Pakenham, Suffolk. He died in 1620 and was buried at Elmswell; a memorial was erected to him in the parish church.

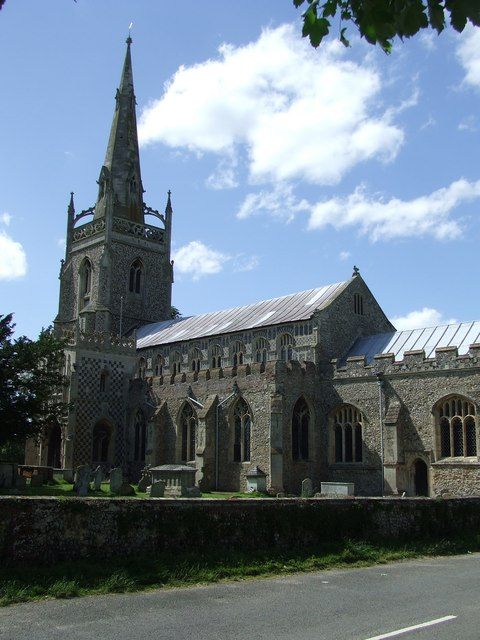
St Mary's Church, Woolpit. Gardiner was Lord of the Manor here.

== Family ==
He married firstly Anne Cordell (died 1587), daughter of Robert Cordell, brewer, a cousin of the prominent judge and politician Sir William Cordell. He married secondly Thomasine Barker, daughter of John Barker of Ipswich, and thirdly Mary (or Anne) Trelawney, daughter of John Trelawney of Menheniot, Cornwall and Anne Reskymer, and widow of John Spring of Lavenham. His three children by Anne all died young; most of his estate passed to a grandnephew, Gardiner Webb, who lived until 1674, having married a daughter of Sir Martin Stuteville of Dalham Hall. The residue was left to his sister Mary Snow. Through his third marriage he was the stepfather of the politician Sir William Spring (1588-1638), (whose son was made a baronet), to whom he left his choice of a horse. Robert seems to have treated William very much as though he were his own son, and raised him in his own strong Puritan beliefs.

== Character ==
Francis Bacon thought highly of Gardiner, urging one of his successors as Lord Chief Justice to follow the example of his "constancy and integrity". Bacon's high opinion of Gardiner was shared by many of his colleagues. The English Chief Justice Wray praised him as "wise, learned, discreet and courageous". Sir Henry Wallop called him the most constant man who was ever sent from England to govern Ireland. Lord Deputy FitzWilliam said that he was so "wise, temperate and useful" that his services to the Crown could not easily be spared. A eulogy on his death called him: "the favourite of his family, the glory of his friends".

In an age when a good deal of official corruption was tolerated, Gardiner had a reputation for honesty. He himself maintained that he had no interest in lining his pockets, being content with what his father had left him. However, he probably profited from his office to some extent, as he was able to purchase the manors of Elmswell and Woolpit, as well as lands in Norfolk.

Legal offices
Preceded by James Dowdall	Lord Chief Justice of Ireland; 1586–1603	Succeeded by James Ley
