= Bury St Edmunds (constituency) =

UK Parliamentary constituency, 1801–2024

Coordinates: 52.25°N 0.90°E

- Former county constituency for the House of Commons
- Boundary of Bury St Edmunds in Suffolk for the 2010 general election

- Location of Suffolk within East of England
- Local government in East of England: Suffolk
- Population: 113,678 (2011 census)
- Electorate: 89,644 (December 2019)
- Major settlements: Bury St Edmunds, Elmswell, Needham Market, Stowmarket, Thurston

1918–2024
- Seats: One
- Created from: Stowmarket and Bury St Edmunds (Borough)
- Replaced by: Bury St Edmunds and Stowmarket
- During its existence contributed to new seat(s) of: West Suffolk (1997)

Bury St Edmunds
- Former borough constituency for the House of Commons

1614–1918
- Seats: 1614–1885: Two; 1885–1918: One
- Replaced by: Bury St Edmunds (County)

Bury St Edmunds was a constituency (Note: A county constituency (for the purposes of election expenses and type of returning officer).) in Suffolk from 1621 to 2024, most recently represented in the House of Commons of the UK Parliament from 2015 to 2024 by Jo Churchill, a Conservative. (Note: As with all constituencies, the constituency elects one Member of Parliament (MP) by the first past the post system of election at least every five years.)

Under the 2023 Periodic Review of Westminster constituencies, the seat was subject to moderate boundary changes and was abolished for the 2024 general election, with the bulk of the electorate being included in the new constituency of Bury St Edmunds and Stowmarket.

== Constituency profile ==
The constituency covered Bury St Edmunds, Stowmarket and smaller settlements on the A14 corridor. Residents' wealth was around average for the UK.

== History ==
The constituency was created as a Parliamentary Borough in 1614, returning two MPs to the House of Commons of England until 1707, then to the House of Commons of Great Britain until 1800, and from 1800 to the House of Commons of the United Kingdom. By the mid eighteenth century the seat was seen as heavily influenced by the Earl of Bristol and the Duke of Grafton. Its representation was reduced to one seat under the Redistribution of Seats Act 1885. Under the Representation of the People Act 1918, it was abolished as a borough and reconstituted as a division of the Parliamentary County of West Suffolk. As well as the abolished borough, the expanded seat comprised most of the abolished Stowmarket Division, except for the town of Stowmarket itself. From 1950, it has been classified as a county constituency in terms of election expenses and type of returning officer.

The electorate has elected Conservative Party candidates at the general elections and two by-elections since a Liberal victory in 1880. The closest contest since that year was in 1997 when the Labour Party candidate fell 368 votes, less than 1%, short of winning the seat in 1997 during Tony Blair's first landslide result.

== Boundaries and boundary changes ==
=== 1918–1950 ===
- The Borough of Bury St Edmunds;
- The Urban District of Newmarket;
- The Rural Districts of Brandon, Mildenhall, and Thedwastre; and
- Parts of the Rural Districts of Moulton and Thingoe.

=== 1950–1983 ===
- The Borough of Bury St Edmunds:
- The Urban Districts of Haverhill and Newmarket; and
- The Rural Districts of Clare, Mildenhall, Thedwastre, and Thingoe.

Extended to the south-west, gaining western and northern parts of the abolished Sudbury Division of West Suffolk, including Haverhill.

=== 1983–1997 ===
- The Borough of St Edmundsbury wards of Abbeygate, Barningham, Barrow, Chevington, Eastgate, Fornham, Great Barton, Honington, Horringer, Ixworth, Northgate, Pakenham, Risby, Risbygate, Rougham, St Olave's, Sextons, Southgate, Stanton, Westgate, and Whelnetham; and
- The District of Forest Heath.

Southern areas, including Haverhill, were transferred to the new constituency of South Suffolk. The easternmost area, equivalent to the former Rural District of Thedwastre, was transferred to the new constituency of Central Suffolk.

=== 1997–2010 ===
- The Borough of St Edmundsbury wards of Abbeygate, Eastgate, Fornham, Great Barton, Horringer Court, Northgate, Pakenham, Risbygate, Rougham, St Olave's, Sextons, Southgate, Westgate, and Whelnetham; and
- The District of Mid Suffolk wards of Badwell Ash, Elmswell, Gislingham, Haughley and Wetherden, Needham Market, Norton, Onehouse, Rattlesden, Rickinghall, Ringshall, Stowmarket Central, Stowmarket North, Stowmarket South, Stowupland, Thurston, Walsham-le-Willows, and Woolpit.

Major reconfiguration, with the majority of the constituency, including Newmarket, forming the basis of the new County Constituency of West Suffolk. Extended eastwards, gaining western half of Central Suffolk, including Stowmarket.

=== 2010–2024 ===
Map of boundaries 2010–2024
- The Borough of St Edmundsbury wards of Abbeygate, Eastgate, Fornham, Great Barton, Horringer and Whelnetham, Minden, Moreton Hall, Northgate, Pakenham, Risbygate, Rougham, St Olave's, Southgate, and Westgate; and
- The District of Mid Suffolk wards of Bacton and Old Newton, Badwell Ash, Elmswell and Norton, Gislingham, Haughley and Wetherden, Needham Market, Onehouse, Rattlesden, Rickinghall and Walsham, Ringshall, Stowmarket Central, Stowmarket North, Stowmarket South, Stowupland, Thurston and Hessett, and Woolpit.

Marginal changes due to revision of local authority wards.

The constituency contained the towns of Bury St Edmunds, Stowmarket and Needham Market. Its boundaries did not match those of the former borough of St Edmundsbury, which included Haverhill (part of West Suffolk constituency), and excludes Stowmarket and Needham Market.

== Members of Parliament ==
=== MPs 1621–1660 ===
Parliament	First member	Second member
1621	Sir Thomas Jermyn	John Woodford
1624	Sir Thomas Jermyn	Anthony Crofts
1625	Sir Thomas Jermyn	Sir William Spring
1626	Sir Thomas Jermyn	Emanuel Gifford
1628	Sir Thomas Jermyn	Sir William Hervey
1629–1640	No Parliaments summoned	
1640 April	Sir Thomas Jermyn	John Godbolt
1640 November	Thomas Jermyn, disabled on 14 February 1644	Henry Jermyn, ennobled 6 September 1643
1645	Sir Thomas Barnardiston	Sir William Spring, excluded in Pride's Purge in 1648
1653	Bury St Edmunds not represented in Barebones Parliament	
1654	Samuel Moody	John Clarke
1656	Samuel Moody	John Clarke
1659	John Clarke	Thomas Chaplin
1659 Restored Rump Parliament	Sir Thomas Barnardiston	No second member (Note: Sir William Spring, 1st Baronet had died in 1654)

=== MPs 1660–1885 ===
Two Members

Year	First member	First party	Second member	Second party
1660	Sir Henry Crofts		Sir John Duncombe	
1661	Sir Edmund Poley		Sir John Duncombe	
1673	William Duncombe		Sir John Duncombe	
1679	Sir Thomas Hervey		Thomas Jermyn	
1685	Sir Thomas Hervey		William Crofts	
1689	Sir Thomas Hervey		Sir Robert Davers, Bt	Tory
1690	Henry Goldwell		Sir Robert Davers, Bt	Tory
1694	John Hervey	Whig	Sir Robert Davers, Bt	Tory
1701	John Hervey	Whig	Sir Thomas Felton, Bt	Whig
1703	Sir Robert Davers, Bt	Tory	Sir Thomas Felton, Bt	Whig
Dec. 1705	Aubrey Porter		Sir Thomas Felton, Bt	Whig
1709	Aubrey Porter		Joseph Weld	
1712	Aubrey Porter		Samuel Batteley	
1713	Aubrey Porter		Lord Hervey	
1717	James Reynolds		Lord Hervey	
1722	James Reynolds		Sir Jermyn Davers, Bt	Tory
1725	Lord Hervey		Sir Jermyn Davers, Bt	Tory
1727	Lord Hervey		Thomas Norton	
1733	Thomas Hervey		Thomas Norton	
1747	Felton Hervey		Viscount Petersham	
1756	Felton Hervey		The Earl of Euston	
1757	Felton Hervey		Hon. Augustus Hervey	
1761	Hon. Charles Fitzroy		Hon. Augustus Hervey	
1763	Hon. Charles Fitzroy		William Hervey	
1768	Hon. Charles Fitzroy		Hon. Augustus Hervey	
1774	Sir Charles Davers, Bt		Hon. Augustus Hervey	
1775	Sir Charles Davers, Bt		Henry Seymour Conway	Whig
1784	Sir Charles Davers, Bt		Hon. George FitzRoy	
1787	Sir Charles Davers, Bt		Lord Charles FitzRoy	
1796	Sir Charles Davers, Bt		Lord Hervey	
1802	Lord Charles FitzRoy		Lord Hervey	
1803	Lord Charles FitzRoy		The Lord Templetown	
1812	Lord Charles FitzRoy		Frederick Foster	Whig
1818	The Earl of Euston	Whig	Hon. Arthur Upton	Whig
1820	Lord John FitzRoy	Whig	Hon. Arthur Upton	Whig
1826	Earl Jermyn	Tory	Earl of Euston	Whig
1831	Earl Jermyn	Tory	Charles Augustus FitzRoy	Whig
1832	Earl Jermyn	Tory	Lord Charles FitzRoy	Whig
1834	Earl Jermyn	Conservative	Lord Charles FitzRoy	Whig
1847	Earl Jermyn	Conservative	Edward Bunbury	Whig
1852	Earl Jermyn	Conservative	John Stuart	Conservative
Dec 1852 by-election	Earl Jermyn	Conservative	James Oakes	Conservative
1857	Earl Jermyn	Conservative	Joseph Hardcastle	Whig
1859 by-election	Lord Alfred Hervey	Peelite	Joseph Hardcastle	Whig
1859	Lord Alfred Hervey	Peelite	Joseph Hardcastle	Liberal
1865	Edward Greene	Conservative	Joseph Hardcastle	Liberal
1874	Edward Greene	Conservative	Lord Francis Hervey	Conservative
1880	Edward Greene	Conservative	Joseph Hardcastle	Liberal
1885	representation reduced to one member			

=== MPs since 1885 ===
Year	Member	Party	Notes
1885	Lord Francis Hervey	Conservative	
1892 by-election	Henry Cadogan	Conservative	
1900	Edward Greene	Conservative	
1906	Frederick Hervey	Conservative	Succeeded to the peerage as 4th Marquess of Bristol
1907 by-election	Walter Guinness	Conservative	
Constituency merged with majority of the abolished Stowmarket
1918	Walter Guinness	Conservative	Minister of Agriculture and Fisheries (1925–1929)
1931	Frank Heilgers	Conservative	Died January 1944
1944 by-election	Edgar Keatinge	Conservative	
1945	Geoffrey Clifton-Brown	Conservative	
1950	William Aitken	Conservative	Died January 1964
1964 by-election	Eldon Griffiths	Conservative	Minister for Sport (1970–1974)
1992	Richard Spring	Conservative	Contested West Suffolk following redistribution
Constituency split, majority renamed West Suffolk, minority merged with parts of the abolished Central Suffolk
1997	David Ruffley	Conservative	
2015	Jo Churchill	Conservative	Minister of State for Employment (2023–2024)

== Election results 1997–2024 ==
2020s - 2010s – 2000s – 1990s – 1980s – 1970s – 1960s – 1950s – 1940s – 1930s – 1920s – 1910s – 1900s – 1890s – 1880s – 1870s – 1860s– 1850s– 1840s– Back to Top

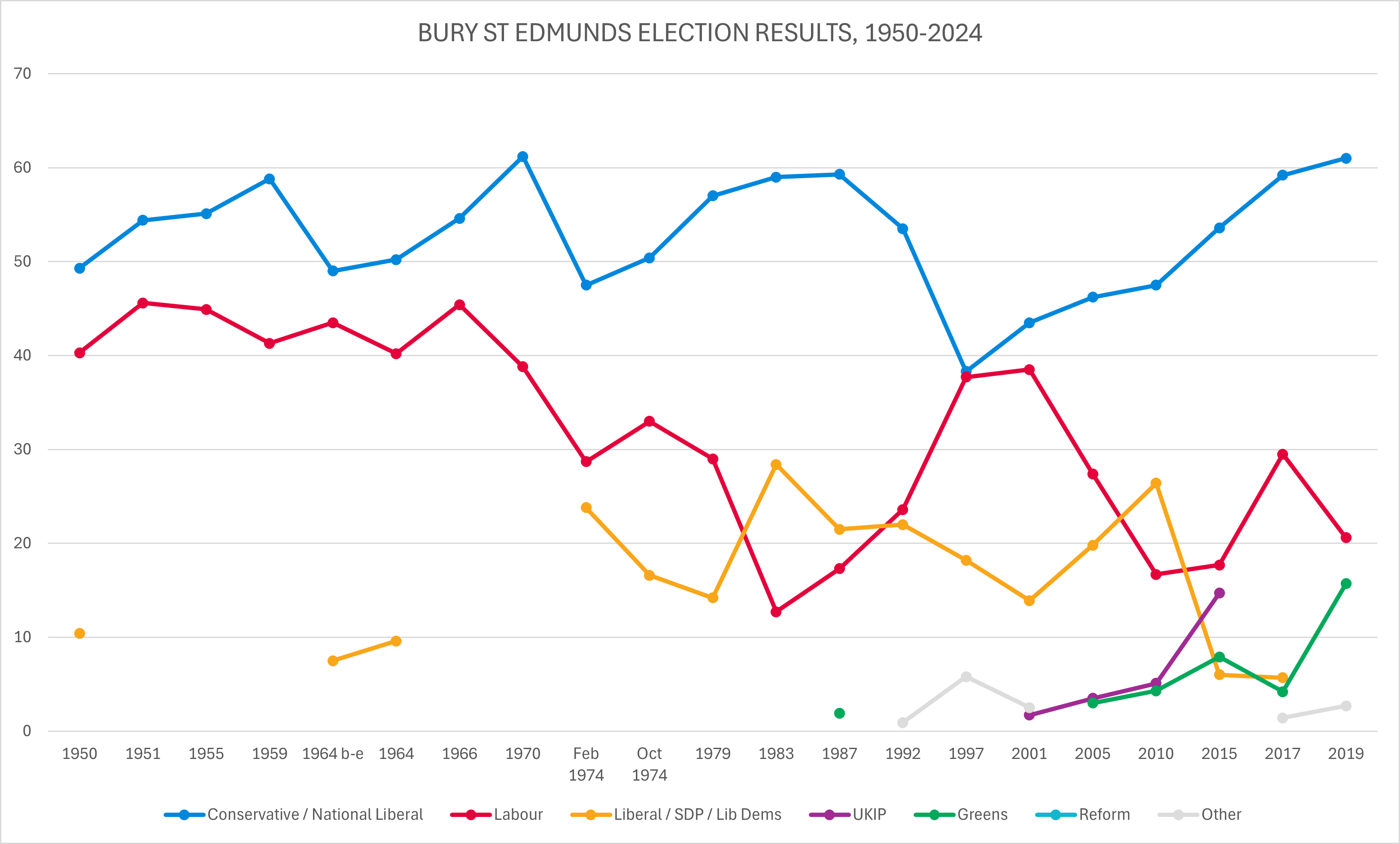
Election results 1950-2019

=== Elections in the 2010s ===
General election 2019: Bury St Edmunds
Party	Candidate	Votes	%	±%
Conservative	Jo Churchill	37,770	61.0	+1.8
Labour	Cliff Waterman	12,782	20.6	−8.9
Green	Helen Geake	9,711	15.7	+11.5
Independent	Paul Hopfensperger	1,694	2.7	New
Majority		24,988	40.4	+10.7
Turnout		61,957	69.1	−3.1
Registered electors		89,644		+4.2
Conservative hold		Swing	+5.3	

General election 2017: Bury St Edmunds
Party	Candidate	Votes	%	±%
Conservative	Jo Churchill	36,794	59.2	+5.6
Labour	William Edwards	18,353	29.5	+11.8
Liberal Democrats	Helen Korfanty	3,565	5.7	−0.3
Green	Helen Geake	2,596	4.2	−3.7
Independent	Liam Byrne	852	1.4	New
Majority		18,441	29.7	−6.2
Turnout		62,160	72.2	+3.2
Registered electors		86,071		
Conservative hold		Swing	-3.1	

Note: Independent politician St Edmundsbury Borough Councillor and Bury St Edmunds Town Councillor Paul Hopfensperger submitted a valid nomination but this was subsequently withdrawn. Because of the timing of the withdrawal, his name appears in the Statement of Persons Nominated for this election.

General election 2015: Bury St Edmunds
Party	Candidate	Votes	%	±%
Conservative	Jo Churchill	31,815	53.6	+6.1
Labour	William Edwards	10,514	17.7	+1.0
UKIP	John Howlett	8,739	14.7	+9.6
Green	Helen Geake	4,692	7.9	+3.6
Liberal Democrats	David Chappell	3,581	6.0	−20.4
Majority		21,301	35.9	+14.8
Turnout		59,341	69.0	−0.3
Registered electors				
Conservative hold		Swing	+2.5	

General election 2010: Bury St Edmunds
Party	Candidate	Votes	%	±%
Conservative	David Ruffley	27,899	47.5	+1.2
Liberal Democrats	David Chappell	15,519	26.4	+6.7
Labour	Kevin Hind	9,776	16.7	−10.7
UKIP	John Howlett	3,003	5.1	+1.6
Green	Mark Ereira-Guyer	2,521	4.3	+1.3
Majority		12,380	21.1	+2.2
Turnout		58,718	69.3	+2.5
Registered electors				
Conservative hold		Swing	−2.8	

=== Elections in the 2000s ===
2020s - 2010s – 2000s – 1990s – 1980s – 1970s – 1960s – 1950s – 1940s – 1930s – 1920s – 1910s – 1900s – 1890s – 1880s – 1870s – 1860s– 1850s– 1840s– Back to Top

General election 2005: Bury St Edmunds
Party	Candidate	Votes	%	±%
Conservative	David Ruffley	24,332	46.2	+2.7
Labour	David Monaghan	14,402	27.4	−11.1
Liberal Democrats	David Chappell	10,423	19.8	+5.9
UKIP	John Howlett	1,859	3.5	+1.8
Green	Graham Manning	1,603	3.0	New
Majority		9,930	18.8	+13.8
Turnout		52,619	66.1	+0.1
Registered electors				
Conservative hold		Swing	+6.9	

General election 2001: Bury St Edmunds
Party	Candidate	Votes	%	±%
Conservative	David Ruffley	21,850	43.5	+5.2
Labour	Mark Ereira-Guyer	19,347	38.5	+0.8
Liberal Democrats	Richard Williams	6,998	13.9	−4.3
UKIP	John Howlett	831	1.7	New
Independent	Michael Brundle	651	1.3	New
Socialist Labour	Michael Benwell	580	1.2	New
Majority		2,503	5.0	+4.4
Turnout		50,257	66.0	−9.0
Registered electors				
Conservative hold		Swing	+2.1	

=== Elections in the 1990s ===
2020s - 2010s – 2000s – 1990s – 1980s – 1970s – 1960s – 1950s – 1940s – 1930s – 1920s – 1910s – 1900s – 1890s – 1880s – 1870s – 1860s– 1850s– 1840s– Back to Top

General election 1997: Bury St Edmunds
Party	Candidate	Votes	%	±%
Conservative	David Ruffley	21,290	38.3	−7.6
Labour	Mark Ereira-Guyer	20,922	37.7	+11.7
Liberal Democrats	David A. Cooper	10,102	18.2	−8.7
Referendum	Ian C.H. McWhirter	2,939	5.3	New
Natural Law	Joanna B. Lillis	272	0.5	−0.4
Majority		368	0.6	−29.4
Turnout		55,525	75.0	+0.6
Registered electors				
Conservative hold		Swing	−14.6	

== Election results 1918–1997 ==
=== Elections in the 1990s ===
General election 1992: Bury St Edmunds
Party	Candidate	Votes	%	±%
Conservative	Richard Spring	33,554	53.5	−5.8
Labour	Tommy Sheppard	14,767	23.6	+6.3
Liberal Democrats	John B. Williams	13,814	22.0	+0.5
Natural Law	Joanna B. Lillis	550	0.9	New
Majority		18,787	29.9	−7.9
Turnout		62,685	78.9	+4.8
Registered electors				
Conservative hold		Swing	−6.1	

=== Elections in the 1980s ===
2020s - 2010s – 2000s – 1990s – 1980s – 1970s – 1960s – 1950s – 1940s – 1930s – 1920s – 1910s – 1900s – 1890s – 1880s – 1870s – 1860s– 1850s– 1840s– Back to Top

General election 1987: Bury St Edmunds
Party	Candidate	Votes	%	±%
Conservative	Eldon Griffiths	33,672	59.3	+0.3
SDP	Reginald Harland	12,214	21.5	−6.9
Labour	Christopher Greene	9,841	17.3	+4.6
Green	Ida Wakelam	1,057	1.9	New
Majority		21,458	37.8	+7.2
Turnout		56,784	74.1	+1.8
Registered electors				
Conservative hold		Swing	+3.6	

General election 1983: Bury St Edmunds
Party	Candidate	Votes	%	±%
Conservative	Eldon Griffiths	31,081	59.0	−2.0
SDP	Reginald Harland	14,959	28.4	+14.2
Labour	Wiktor Mosczynski	6,666	12.7	−16.3
Majority		16,122	30.6	+2.6
Turnout		52,706	72.3	−4.0
Registered electors				
Conservative hold		Swing		

=== Elections in the 1970s ===
2020s - 2010s – 2000s – 1990s – 1980s – 1970s – 1960s – 1950s – 1940s – 1930s – 1920s – 1910s – 1900s – 1890s – 1880s – 1870s – 1860s– 1850s– 1840s– Back to Top

General election 1979: Bury St Edmunds
Party	Candidate	Votes	%	±%
Conservative	Eldon Griffiths	41,426	57.0	+6.6
Labour	A. Gibson	21,167	29.0	−4.0
Liberal	G. Jones	10,836	14.2	−2.4
Majority		20,259	28.0	+10.6
Turnout		73,429	76.3	+3.1
Registered electors				
Conservative hold		Swing	+5.3	

General election October 1974: Bury St Edmunds
Party	Candidate	Votes	%	±%
Conservative	Eldon Griffiths	32,179	50.4	+2.9
Labour	J.K Stephenson	21,097	33.0	+4.3
Liberal	G Jones	10,631	16.6	−7.2
Majority		11,082	17.4	−1.4
Turnout		63,907	73.2	−8.1
Registered electors				
Conservative hold		Swing	−0.7	

General election February 1974: Bury St Edmunds
Party	Candidate	Votes	%	±%
Conservative	Eldon Griffiths	33,424	47.5	−13.7
Labour	J.K Stephenson	20,171	28.7	−10.1
Liberal	B. Boulton	16,772	23.8	New
Majority		13,253	18.8	−3.6
Turnout		70,367	81.3	+4.1
Registered electors				
Conservative hold		Swing	−7.2	

General election 1970: Bury St Edmunds
Party	Candidate	Votes	%	±%
Conservative	Eldon Griffiths	36,688	61.2	+6.6
Labour	Colin J. V. Seager	23,286	38.8	−6.6
Majority		13,402	22.4	+13.2
Turnout		59,974	77.2	−1.6
Registered electors				
Conservative hold		Swing		

=== Elections in the 1960s ===
2020s - 2010s – 2000s – 1990s – 1980s – 1970s – 1960s – 1950s – 1940s – 1930s – 1920s – 1910s – 1900s – 1890s – 1880s – 1870s – 1860s– 1850s– 1840s– Back to Top

General election 1966: Bury St Edmunds
Party	Candidate	Votes	%	±%
Conservative	Eldon Griffiths	27,782	54.6	+4.4
Labour	Colin J. V. Seager	23,140	45.4	+5.2
Majority		4,462	9.2	−0.8
Turnout		50,922	78.8	−3.4
Registered electors				
Conservative hold		Swing	-0.8	

General election 1964: Bury St Edmunds
Party	Candidate	Votes	%	±%
Conservative	Eldon Griffiths	25,206	50.2	−8.6
Labour	Noel James Insley	20,216	40.2	−1.1
Liberal	Richard L. Afton	4,840	9.6	N/A
Majority		4,990	10.0	−7.5
Turnout		50,262	82.2	+3.6
Registered electors				
Conservative hold		Swing	-7.5	

1964 Bury St Edmunds by-election
Party	Candidate	Votes	%	±%
Conservative	Eldon Griffiths	22,141	49.0	−9.8
Labour	Noel James Insley	19,682	43.5	+2.2
Liberal	Richard L. Afton	3,387	7.5	New
Majority		2,459	5.5	−12.0
Turnout		45,210		
Registered electors				
Conservative hold		Swing		

=== Elections in the 1950s ===
2020s - 2010s – 2000s – 1990s – 1980s – 1970s – 1960s – 1950s – 1940s – 1930s – 1920s – 1910s – 1900s – 1890s – 1880s – 1870s – 1860s– 1850s– 1840s– Back to Top

General election 1959: Bury St Edmunds
Party	Candidate	Votes	%	±%
Conservative	William Aitken	26,730	58.8	+3.7
Labour	Alison Margaret A. Walter	18,768	41.3	−3.6
Majority		7,962	17.5	+7.3
Turnout		45,498	78.6	+0.3
Registered electors				
Conservative hold		Swing	+3.6	

General election 1955: Bury St Edmunds
Party	Candidate	Votes	%	±%
Conservative	William Aitken	24,532	55.1	+0.7
Labour	Neville Stanley	19,962	44.9	−0.7
Majority		4,570	10.2	+1.4
Turnout		44,494	78.3	−1.5
Registered electors				
Conservative hold		Swing	+0.7	

General election 1951: Bury St Edmunds
Party	Candidate	Votes	%	±%
Conservative	William Aitken	24,679	54.4	+5.1
Labour	Neville Stanley	20,690	45.6	+5.3
Majority		3,989	8.8	−0.2
Turnout		45,369	79.8	−2.7
Registered electors				
Conservative hold		Swing	-0.1	

General election 1950: Bury St Edmunds
Party	Candidate	Votes	%	±%
Conservative	William Aitken	22,559	49.3	+0.6
Labour	Cecily Alicia McCall	18,430	40.3	+10.5
Liberal	Henry William Sparham	4,780	10.4	−8.6
Majority		4,129	9.0	−9.9
Turnout		45,769	82.5	+14.7
Registered electors				
Conservative hold		Swing	-4.9	

=== Elections in the 1940s ===
2020s - 2010s – 2000s – 1990s – 1980s – 1970s – 1960s – 1950s – 1940s – 1930s – 1920s – 1910s – 1900s – 1890s – 1880s – 1870s – 1860s– 1850s– 1840s– Back to Top

General election 1945: Bury St Edmunds
Party	Candidate	Votes	%	±%
Conservative	Geoffrey Clifton-Brown	15,013	48.7	N/A
Labour	Cicely McCall	9,195	29.8	New
Liberal	Harold Charles Drayton	5,863	19.0	New
Common Wealth	Eric Gordon England	750	2.4	New
Majority		5,818	18.9	N/A
Turnout		30,821	67.8	N/A
Registered electors		45,882		
Conservative hold		Swing	N/A	

Following the death of Frank Heilgers on 16 January 1944 a by-election was held on 29 February 1944.

1944 Bury St Edmunds by-election
Party	Candidate	Votes	%	±%
Conservative	Edgar Keatinge	11,705	56.2	N/A
Independent Liberal (Common Wealth)	Margery Corbett Ashby	9,121	43.8	New
Majority		2,584	12.4	N/A
Turnout		20,828	50.8	N/A
Registered electors		40,971		
Conservative hold		Swing	N/A	

=== Elections in the 1930s ===
2020s - 2010s – 2000s – 1990s – 1980s – 1970s – 1960s – 1950s – 1940s – 1930s – 1920s – 1910s – 1900s – 1890s – 1880s – 1870s – 1860s– 1850s– 1840s– Back to Top

General election 1935: Bury St Edmunds
Party	Candidate	Votes	%	±%
Conservative	Frank Heilgers	Unopposed		
Conservative hold				

General election 1931: Bury St Edmunds
Party	Candidate	Votes	%	±%
Conservative	Frank Heilgers	Unopposed		
Registered electors				
Conservative hold				

=== Elections in the 1920s ===
2020s - 2010s – 2000s – 1990s – 1980s – 1970s – 1960s – 1950s – 1940s – 1930s – 1920s – 1910s – 1900s – 1890s – 1880s – 1870s – 1860s– 1850s– 1840s– Back to Top

General election 1929: Bury St Edmunds
Party	Candidate	Votes	%	±%
Unionist	Walter Guinness	16,462	54.4	−8.7
Liberal	Dar Lyon	11,344	37.4	+0.5
Labour	Percy Astins	2,490	8.2	New
Majority		5,118	17.0	−9.2
Turnout		30,296	77.8	−4.0
Registered electors		38,938		
Unionist hold		Swing	−4.6	

On Guinness's nomination as Minister of Agriculture a by-election in 1925 was required under the electoral law of the time, which he won.

1925 Bury St Edmunds by-election
Party	Candidate	Votes	%	±%
Unionist	Walter Guinness	14,700	62.8	−0.3
Liberal	George Nicholls	8,703	37.2	+0.3
Majority		5,997	25.6	−0.6
Turnout		23,403	73.9	−7.9
Registered electors		31,648		
Unionist hold		Swing	−0.3	

General election 1924: Bury St Edmunds
Party	Candidate	Votes	%	±%
Unionist	Walter Guinness	16,073	63.1	N/A
Liberal	John Adam Day	9,392	36.9	New
Majority		6,681	26.2	N/A
Turnout		25,465	81.8	N/A
Registered electors		31,138		
Unionist hold		Swing	N/A	

General election 1923: Bury St Edmunds
Party	Candidate	Votes	%	±%
Unionist	Walter Guinness	Unopposed		
Registered electors				
Unionist hold				

General election 1922: Bury St Edmunds
Party	Candidate	Votes	%	±%
Unionist	Walter Guinness	Unopposed		
Registered electors				
Unionist hold				

=== Elections in the 1910s ===
2020s - 2010s – 2000s – 1990s – 1980s – 1970s – 1960s – 1950s – 1940s – 1930s – 1920s – 1910s – 1900s – 1890s – 1880s – 1870s – 1860s– 1850s– 1840s– Back to Top

General election 1918: Bury St Edmunds
Party		Candidate	Votes	%
C	Unionist	Walter Guinness	Unopposed	
Registered electors				
	Unionist win (new boundaries)			
C indicates candidate endorsed by the coalition government.

== Election results 1885–1918 ==
=== Elections in the 1910s ===
General Election 1914–15:

Another General Election was required to take place before the end of 1915. The political parties had been making preparations for an election to take place and by July 1914, the following candidates had been selected;

- Unionist: Walter Guinness
- Liberal:

General election December 1910: Bury St Edmunds
Party	Candidate	Votes	%	±%
Conservative	Walter Guinness	Unopposed		
Conservative hold				

General election January 1910: Bury St Edmunds
Party	Candidate	Votes	%	±%
Conservative	Walter Guinness	Unopposed		
Conservative hold				

=== Elections in the 1900s ===
2020s - 2010s – 2000s – 1990s – 1980s – 1970s – 1960s – 1950s – 1940s – 1930s – 1920s – 1910s – 1900s – 1890s – 1880s – 1870s – 1860s– 1850s– 1840s– Back to Top

1907 Bury St Edmunds by-election
Party	Candidate	Votes	%	±%
Conservative	Walter Guinness	1,631	68.8	+10.2
Liberal	Walter Baldwyn Yates	741	31.2	−10.2
Majority		890	37.6	+20.4
Turnout		2,372	86.6	−4.1
Registered electors		2,740		
Conservative hold		Swing	+10.2	

General election 1906: Bury St Edmunds
Party	Candidate	Votes	%	±%
Conservative	Frederick Hervey	1,481	58.6	N/A
Liberal	Walter Baldwyn Yates	1,047	41.4	New
Majority		434	17.2	N/A
Turnout		2,528	90.7	N/A
Registered electors		2,788		
Conservative hold		Swing	N/A	

General election 1900: Bury St Edmunds
Party	Candidate	Votes	%	±%
Conservative	Edward Greene	Unopposed		
Conservative hold				

=== Elections in the 1890s ===
2020s - 2010s – 2000s – 1990s – 1980s – 1970s – 1960s – 1950s – 1940s – 1930s – 1920s – 1910s – 1900s – 1890s – 1880s – 1870s – 1860s– 1850s– 1840s– Back to Top

General election 1895: Bury St Edmunds
Party	Candidate	Votes	%	±%
Conservative	Henry Cadogan	Unopposed		
Conservative hold				

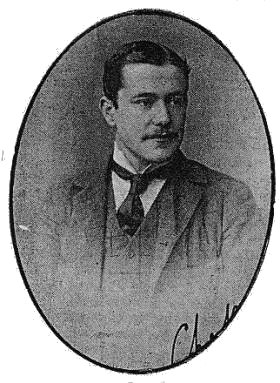
Cadogan

1892 Bury St Edmunds by-election
Party	Candidate	Votes	%	±%
Conservative	Henry Cadogan	Unopposed		
Conservative hold				

General election 1892: Bury St Edmunds
Party	Candidate	Votes	%	±%
Conservative	Francis Hervey	1,267	59.5	+0.8
Liberal	John Eustace Jameson	863	40.5	−0.8
Majority		404	19.0	+1.6
Turnout		2,130	84.7	+0.3
Registered electors		2,515		
Conservative hold		Swing	+0.8	

=== Elections in the 1880s ===
2020s - 2010s – 2000s – 1990s – 1980s – 1970s – 1960s – 1950s – 1940s – 1930s – 1920s – 1910s – 1900s – 1890s – 1880s – 1870s – 1860s– 1850s– 1840s– Back to Top

General election 1886: Bury St Edmunds
Party	Candidate	Votes	%	±%
Conservative	Francis Hervey	1,135	58.7	+4.7
Liberal	Frederick Goodwin	800	41.3	–4.7
Majority		335	17.4	+9.4
Turnout		1,935	84.4	–6.3
Registered electors		2,292		
Conservative hold		Swing	+4.7	

General election 1885: Bury St Edmunds
Party	Candidate	Votes	%
Conservative	Francis Hervey	1,122	54.0
Liberal	Joseph Hardcastle	956	46.0
Majority		166	8.0
Turnout		2,078	90.7
Registered electors		2,292	
Conservative win (new seat)			

== Election results Before 1885 ==
=== Elections in the 1880s ===
General election 1880: Bury St Edmunds (2 seats)
Party	Candidate	Votes	%	±%
Liberal	Joseph Hardcastle	1,110	40.2	−0.8
Conservative	Edward Greene	850	30.8	−0.1
Conservative	Francis Hervey	803	29.1	+1.0
Majority		307	11.1	N/A
Turnout		1,960 (est)	92.4 (est)	+7.6
Registered electors		2,122		
Liberal gain from Conservative		Swing	−0.7	
Conservative hold		Swing		

=== Elections in the 1870s ===
2020s - 2010s – 2000s – 1990s – 1980s – 1970s – 1960s – 1950s – 1940s – 1930s – 1920s – 1910s – 1900s – 1890s – 1880s – 1870s – 1860s– 1850s– 1840s– Back to Top

General election 1874: Bury St Edmunds (2 seats)
Party	Candidate	Votes	%	±%
Conservative	Edward Greene	1,004	30.9	+13.1
Conservative	Francis Hervey	914	28.1	+10.3
Liberal	Joseph Hardcastle	707	21.7	−13.3
Liberal	Charles Lamport	628	19.3	−10.2
Majority		207	6.4	N/A
Turnout		1,627 (est)	84.8 (est)	−5.7
Registered electors		1,919		
Conservative hold		Swing	+11.7	
Conservative gain from Liberal		Swing	+11.8	

=== Elections in the 1860s ===
2020s - 2010s – 2000s – 1990s – 1980s – 1970s – 1960s – 1950s – 1940s – 1930s – 1920s – 1910s – 1900s – 1890s – 1880s – 1870s – 1860s– 1850s– 1840s– Back to Top

General election 1868: Bury St Edmunds (2 seats)
Party	Candidate	Votes	%	±%
Conservative	Edward Greene	714	35.5	+2.1
Liberal	Joseph Hardcastle	703	35.0	−1.9
Liberal	Edward Bunbury	593	29.5	N/A
Majority		11	0.5	
Turnout		1,362 (est)	90.5 (est)	+4.5
Registered electors		1,505		
Conservative hold		Swing	N/A	
Liberal hold		Swing	N/A	

General election 1865: Bury St Edmunds (2 seats)
Party	Candidate	Votes	%	±%
Liberal	Joseph Hardcastle	331	36.9	+6.5
Conservative	Edward Greene	300	33.4	+5.3
Liberal-Conservative	Alfred Hervey	266	29.7	−11.7
Majority		31	3.5	+1.2
Turnout		582 (est)	86.0 (est)	+13.4
Registered electors		676		
Liberal hold		Swing	+6.2	
Conservative hold		Swing	+5.6	

=== Elections in the 1850s ===
2020s - 2010s – 2000s – 1990s – 1980s – 1970s – 1960s – 1950s – 1940s – 1930s – 1920s – 1910s – 1900s – 1890s – 1880s – 1870s – 1860s– 1850s– 1840s– Back to Top

General election 1859: Bury St Edmunds (2 seats)
Party	Candidate	Votes	%	±%
Conservative	Alfred Hervey	418	41.4	+4.4
Liberal	Joseph Hardcastle	307	30.4	−4.0
Conservative	Robert Buxton	284	28.1	−0.5
Turnout		505 (est)	72.6 (est)	+6.4
Registered electors		695		
Majority		134	13.3	N/A
Majority		23	2.3	−3.5
Liberal hold		Swing	−1.9	
Conservative hold		Swing	+4.4	

By-election, 7 March 1859: Bury St Edmunds
Party	Candidate	Votes	%	±%
Conservative	Alfred Hervey	Unopposed		
Conservative hold		Swing	N/A	

- Caused by Hervey's succession to the peerage, becoming 2nd Marquess of Bristol

General election 1857: Bury St Edmunds (2 seats)
Party	Candidate	Votes	%	±%
Conservative	Frederick Hervey	344	37.0	−6.2
Whig	Joseph Hardcastle	320	34.4	+6.4
Conservative	James Oakes	266	28.6	−0.2
Turnout		465 (est)	66.2 (est)	−10.7
Registered electors		702		
Majority		24	2.6	+1.8
Conservative hold		Swing	−4.7	
Majority		54	5.8	N/A
Whig gain from Conservative		Swing	+6.4	

By-election, 4 December 1852: Bury St Edmunds
Party	Candidate	Votes	%	±%
Conservative	James Oakes	324	50.6	−21.4
Whig	Joseph Hardcastle	316	49.4	+21.4
Majority		8	1.2	+0.4
Turnout		640	89.8	+12.9
Registered electors		713		
Conservative hold		Swing	−21.4	

- Caused by Stuart's resignation after being appointed a Vice-Chancellor of the Court of Chancery.

General election 1852: Bury St Edmunds (2 seats)
Party	Candidate	Votes	%	±%
Conservative	Frederick Hervey	493	43.2	+3.4
Conservative	John Stuart	328	28.8	+1.9
Whig	Edward Bunbury	319	28.0	−5.3
Majority		9	0.8	N/A
Turnout		570 (est)	76.9 (est)	+11.6
Registered electors		741		
Conservative hold		Swing	+3.0	
Conservative gain from Whig		Swing	+2.3	

=== Elections in the 1840s ===
2020s - 2010s – 2000s – 1990s – 1980s – 1970s – 1960s – 1950s – 1940s – 1930s – 1920s – 1910s – 1900s – 1890s – 1880s – 1870s – 1860s– 1850s– 1840s– Back to Top

General election 1847: Bury St Edmunds (2 seats)
Party	Candidate	Votes	%	±%
Conservative	Frederick Hervey	390	39.8	+11.5
Whig	Edward Bunbury	327	33.3	−13.6
Conservative	Horace Twiss	264	26.9	+2.2
Turnout		491 (est)	65.3 (est)	−20.5
Registered electors		751		
Majority		63	6.5	+3.9
Conservative hold		Swing	+9.2	
Majority		63	6.4	+5.4
Whig hold		Swing	−13.7	

By-election, 14 September 1841: Bury St Edmunds
Party	Candidate	Votes	%	±%
Conservative	Frederick Hervey	Unopposed		
Conservative hold				

- Caused by Hervey's appointment as Treasurer of the Household

General election 1841: Bury St Edmunds (2 seats)
Party	Candidate	Votes	%	±%
Conservative	Frederick Hervey	341	28.3	+2.9
Whig	Charles FitzRoy	310	25.7	−0.8
Conservative	Horace Twiss	298	24.7	+1.9
Whig	Rowland Gardiner Alston	256	21.2	−4.1
Turnout		612	85.8	−0.3
Registered electors		713		
Majority		31	2.6	+2.5
Conservative hold		Swing	+2.7	
Majority		12	1.0	−0.1
Whig hold		Swing	−1.6	

=== Elections in the 1830s ===
2020s - 2010s – 2000s – 1990s – 1980s – 1970s – 1960s – 1950s – 1940s – 1930s – 1920s – 1910s – 1900s – 1890s – 1880s – 1870s – 1860s– 1850s– 1840s– 1830s– Back to Top

General election 1837: Bury St Edmunds (2 seats)
Party	Candidate	Votes	%	±%
Whig	Charles FitzRoy	289	26.5	−7.6
Conservative	Frederick Hervey	277	25.4	+8.1
Whig	Charles Bunbury	275	25.3	−6.0
Conservative	Frederick Gough-Calthorpe	248	22.8	+5.5
Turnout		552	86.1	−7.8
Registered electors		641		
Majority		12	1.1	
Whig hold		Swing	−7.2	
Majority		2	0.1	−0.4
Conservative hold		Swing	+7.5	

By-election, 26 June 1835: Bury St Edmunds
Party	Candidate	Votes	%	±%
Whig	Charles FitzRoy	Unopposed		
Whig hold				

- Caused by FitzRoy's appointment as Vice-Chamberlain of the Household

General election 1835: Bury St Edmunds (2 seats)
Party	Candidate	Votes	%	±%
Conservative	Frederick Hervey	317	34.6	+2.7
Whig	Charles FitzRoy	312	34.1	−6.2
Whig	Charles Bunbury	287	31.3	+3.4
Majority		5	0.5	−3.5
Turnout		582	93.9	+5.6
Registered electors		620		
Conservative hold		Swing	+2.8	
Whig hold		Swing	−3.8	

General election 1832: Bury St Edmunds (2 seats)
Party	Candidate	Votes	%	±%
Whig	Charles FitzRoy	344	40.3	+14.9
Tory	Frederick Hervey	272	31.9	−39.3
Whig	Frederick King Eagle	238	27.9	+24.5
Turnout		521	88.3	+1.8
Registered electors		590		
Majority		72	8.4	+6.7
Whig hold		Swing	+17.3	
Majority		34	4.0	−18.1
Tory hold		Swing	−39.4	

General election 1831: Bury St Edmunds (2 seats)
Party	Candidate	Votes	%	±%
Tory	Frederick Hervey	28	47.5	N/A
Whig	Charles Augustus FitzRoy	15	25.4	N/A
Tory	Philip Bennet	14	23.7	N/A
Whig	Robert Rolfe	2	3.4	N/A
Turnout		32	86.5	N/A
Registered electors		37		
Majority		13	22.1	N/A
Tory hold		Swing	N/A	
Majority		1	1.7	N/A
Whig hold		Swing	N/A	

General election 1830: Bury St Edmunds (2 seats)
Party	Candidate	Votes	%	±%
Tory	Frederick Hervey	Unopposed		
Whig	Henry FitzRoy	Unopposed		
Tory hold				
Whig hold				

== See also ==
- List of parliamentary constituencies in Suffolk

== Sources ==
- Craig, F. W. S. (1989) [1977]. British parliamentary election results 1832–1885 (2nd ed.). Chichester: Parliamentary Research Services. ISBN 0-900178-26-4.
- Craig, F. W. S. (1989) [1974]. British parliamentary election results 1885–1918 (2nd ed.). Chichester: Parliamentary Research Services. ISBN 0-900178-27-2.
- Craig, F. W. S. (1983) [1969]. British parliamentary election results 1918–1949 (3rd ed.). Chichester: Parliamentary Research Services. ISBN 0-900178-06-X.
