= William Duncombe (MP) =

William Duncombe (c. 1647-1704) was one of the two MPs for Bury St Edmunds between 1673 and 1679 and also for Bedfordshire in 1689 and 1695.
