= William Crofts (MP) =

William Crofts (c. 1639-1695) was one of the two MPs for Bury St Edmunds between 1685 and 1689.
