= Sir Edward Greene, 1st Baronet =

British politician

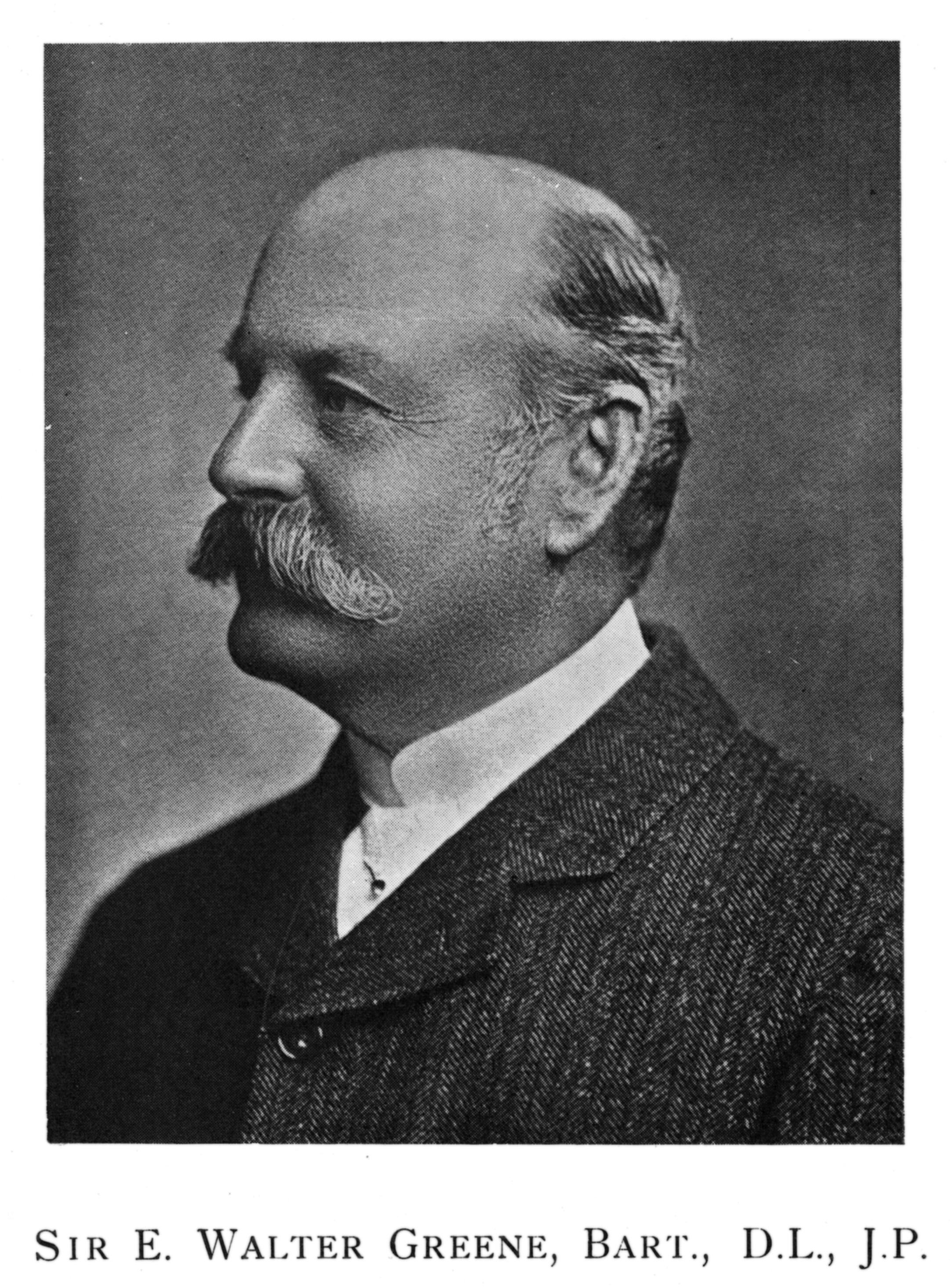
1906 or earlier

Sir Edward Walter Greene, 1st Baronet (14 March 1842 – 27 February 1920) was a British brewer and Conservative Party politician.

He unsuccessfully contested a by-election in the Stowmarket constituency in 1891, but was narrowly defeated by the Liberal Party candidate. He was High Sheriff of Suffolk in 1897. He did not stand for parliament again until the 1900 general election, when he was elected unopposed as Member of Parliament (MP) for Bury St Edmunds. He stepped down at the 1906 general election and did not stand again.

He was made a Baronet, of Nether Hall in the Parish of Thurston in the County of Suffolk, on 21 June 1900.

He was appointed Honorary Colonel of the 3rd (Reserve) Battalion, Suffolk Regiment, on 7 June 1908.

After his death Nether Hall was sold by his son Sir Raymond Greene, 2nd Baronet.

== Arms ==
Coat of arms of Sir Edward Greene, 1st Baronet

Crest
In front of an eagle's head erased Or holding in the beak a sprig of three trefoils slipped Vert two annulets interlaced Azure between as many bezants.
Escutcheon
Argent on a cross indented Gules two annulets interlaced between four crescents Or a chief Azure thereon between two bezants a pale of the third charged with a crescent of the fourth.
Motto
Non Sine Numine

Parliament of the United Kingdom
Preceded by Viscount Chelsea	Member of Parliament for Bury St Edmunds; 1900–1906	Succeeded by Frederick Hervey
Baronetage of the United Kingdom
New creation	Baronet (of Nether Hall); 1900–1920	Succeeded by Walter Raymond Greene
