= Lord John Hervey =

English aristocrat

Lord John Hervey (15 November 1841 – 25 February 1902, Bungay) was an English aristocrat who became active in local politics in Suffolk and contributed to scholarly life of that county. He was widely travelled and participated in antiquarian research.

== Early life ==
John William Nicholas Hervey was the third of four sons of Frederick Hervey, 2nd Marquess of Bristol. Like his brothers he was educated at Eton and graduated from Trinity College, Cambridge in 1856. He was friends with William Brampton Gurdon, who described Hervey's popularity as "wonderful" at both institutions in a later obituary. At Trinity College he developed a friendship with Edward, Prince of Wales. He graduated in 1865 with a degree in classics.

== Travel ==
After graduation Hervey visited Egypt, Palestine, and Syria. However during a subsequent visit to Greece in 1866 he was captured by pirates. Whilst on a hunting expedition with Henry Strutt, 2nd Baron Belper and Mr Coore. They visited Askatos but went to a more remote area in search of animals to shoot. Not expecting an encounter with brigands, they had not arranged for an escort of gendarmes on this occasion. Having been captured, the pirates agreed to release two of them with a ransome demand. Mr Coore was chosen by lot to remain a captive. Strutt and Hervey were released on parole with a demand for £3,000 in gold to secure Mr Coore's release. They returned with the support of HMS Chanticleer which remained out of sight while the release of Mr Coore was negotiated.

== Military career ==
John Hervey joined the 3rd Battalion, Suffolk Regiment, where he attained the rank of Major.

== Antiquarian activities ==
- (1889–1890) Suffolk Domesday. The Latin text extended and translated into English for private circulation by J.H., Bury St. Edmunds: Printed at the 'Free Press' Works in twenty five parts
- (1902) The Hundred Rolls And Extracts Therefrom: Made By Authority, Second Edward I, County Of Suffolk, Lothingland)

== Political career ==
Whereas his three brothers, were all elected as Conservative Party Members of Parliament, his three attempts to get elected between 1868 and 1886 as an MP for the Liberal Party all failed.
