= James Oakes (MP) =

British conservative politician (1821 - 1901)

James Henry Porteous Oakes

Member of Parliament for Bury St Edmunds
- In office 4 December 1852 – 27 March 1857 Serving with Frederick Hervey
- Preceded by: Frederick Hervey; John Stuart
- Succeeded by: Frederick Hervey; Joseph Hardcastle

Personal details
- Born: 1821
- Died: 1901 (aged 79–80)
- Party: Conservative

James Henry Porteous Oakes (28 September 1821, Nowton – 22 January 1901, Nowton) was a British Conservative politician.

James was the son of Henry Oakes and Maria Ann Porteus.

Oakes was elected Conservative MP for Bury St Edmunds at a by-election in 1852—caused by the appointment of John Stuart as a Vice-Chancellor in the Court of Chancery—and held the seat until 1857 when he was defeated.

Parliament of the United Kingdom
| Preceded by Frederick Hervey; John Stuart | Member of Parliament for Bury St Edmunds; 1852–1857; With: Frederick Hervey | Succeeded by Frederick Hervey; Joseph Hardcastle |
