= John Duncombe (Bury St Edmunds MP) =

English politician

Sir John Duncombe (1622 – 4 March 1687) was an English politician who sat in the House of Commons from 1660 to 1679. He served as Chancellor of the Exchequer between 1672 and 1676.

Duncombe was the son of William Duncombe of Battlesden and his wife Elizabeth Poyntz, daughter of Sir John Poyntz of South Ockendon, Essex and was baptised on 29 July 1622. He was educated at Eton College and Christ's College, Cambridge. He was knighted in 1648.

In 1660, Duncombe was elected Member of Parliament for Bury St Edmunds in the Convention Parliament. He was re-elected MP for Bury St Edmunds in 1661 for the Cavalier Parliament. From 1664 to 1670, he was one of three Commissioners for the Office of Master of the Ordnance. He was appointed to the Privy Council on 22 May 1667 and was made a Commissioner of the Treasury until November 1672. He was Chancellor of the Exchequer from 22 November 1672 to 2 May 1676.

Political offices
Preceded by The Earl of Shaftesbury	Chancellor of the Exchequer of England; 22 November 1672 – 2 May 1676	Succeeded by Sir John Ernle
