= 1944 Ilford rail crash =

1944 rail crash in east London

Coordinates: 51°33′31″N 0°4′5″E

Ilford rail crash
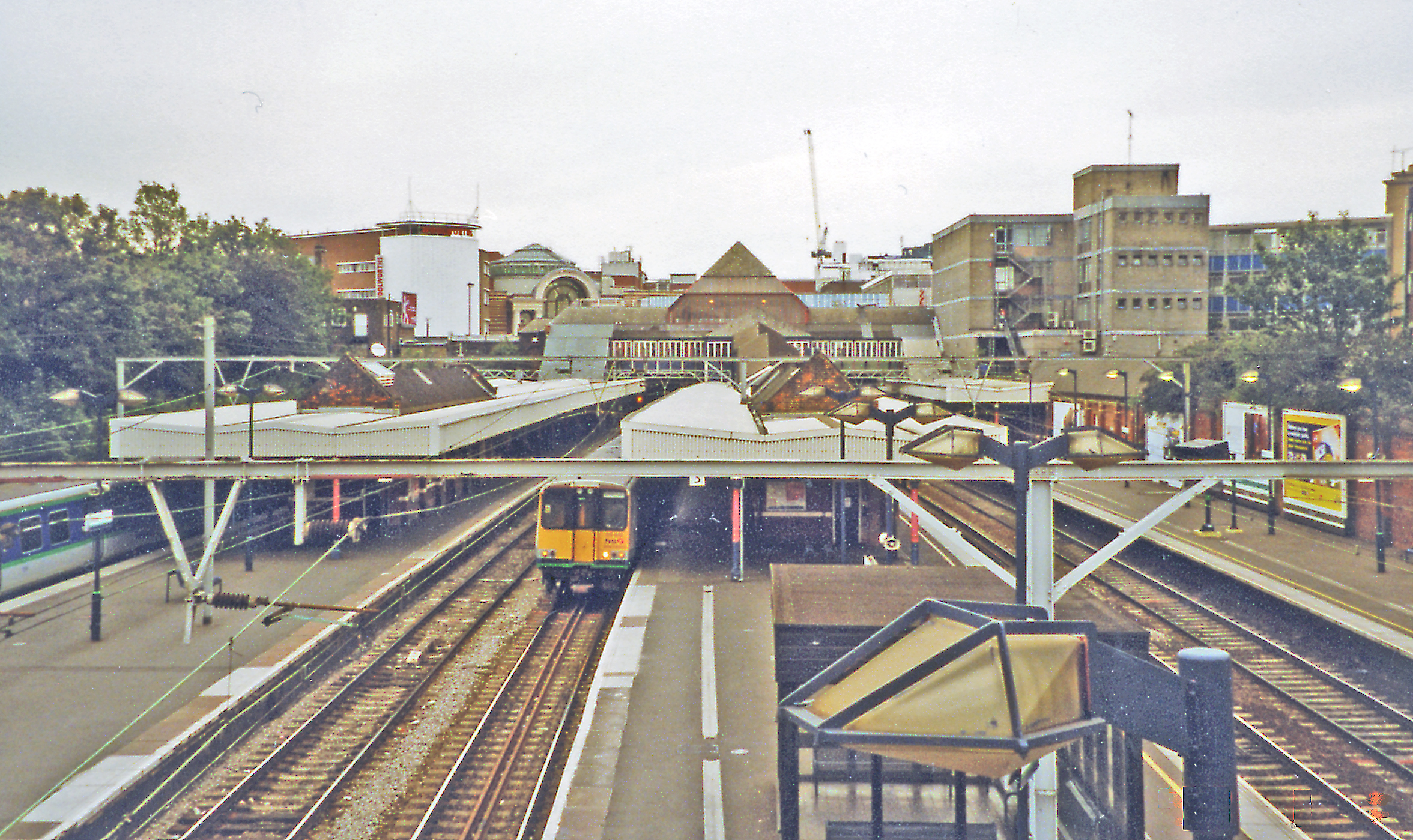
- Ilford station in 2002; the collision took place on the 'through' lines on the right

Details
- Date: 16 January 1944; 19:20
- Location: Ilford
- Country: England
- Line: Great Eastern Main Line
- Operator: London and North Eastern Railway
- Incident type: Collision
- Cause: Signal passed at danger

Statistics
- Trains: 2
- Deaths: 9
- Injured: 38

The 1944 Ilford rail crash occurred on 16 January 1944 when, in darkness and dense fog, an express passenger train passed a signal at danger and collided with another passenger train that was stopped at Ilford railway station in Essex, England.

The collision killed nine people, including three United States Army personnel and Frank Heilgers, the Member of Parliament for Bury St. Edmunds. Thirty-eight people were injured.

== Collision ==
At approximately 19:20 on 16 January 1944, in dense fog and wartime conditions, the 14:38 express train from Yarmouth was stopped at Ilford en route to London Liverpool Street. Due to poor visibility, the driver had not seen several caution signals and subsequently stopped 110 yards (100 m) past a signal at danger. The driver walked to the signal box and after a short wait was given a "line clear" by the signalman.

As the driver returned to his train the signalman received a telephone call from a colleague in the adjacent box reporting that the following train, the 14:40 express from Norwich Thorpe had also passed his signals at danger. The Ilford station inspector, who had arrived at the signal box to find out why the Yarmouth express had stopped, was sent to place detonators at the rear of the train, however, before he was able to take any action the Norwich train ran into the rear of the Yarmouth service at a speed of 20–25 mph (32–40 km/h).

The Yarmouth train comprised a 4-6-0 steam locomotive hauling nine coaches and a two-coach articulated set. The Norwich service was made up of a 4-6-0 locomotive, an LNER B17 No. 2868 Bradford City, hauling ten coaches and a two-coach articulated set. Both services were busy with passengers. There were nine fatalities as a consequence of the collision, including Frank Heilgers, the Member of Parliament for Bury St. Edmunds. Twenty-eight people were hospitalized and ten others suffered shock or minor injuries.

== Aftermath ==
First aid was available immediately as an American doctor and nurse had been travelling on the train; also a member of staff had been ambulance-trained. Ilford civil defence personnel arrived at 19:36 and ambulances and the civil rescue squad followed at around 19:50. A local U.S. Army depot sent a medical detachment. Hampered by a lack of light and the fog, the last of the casualties were only recovered by 21:20.

The collision blocked the two through lines to and from London until 14:30 the next day, but the two local lines were not affected and a crossover facility meant the impact on rail traffic was minimal.

== See also ==
- Ilford rail crash (1915)
