= Montpelier =

Montpelier or Montpellier may refer to:

== Places ==
=== United Kingdom ===
- Montpelier, Brighton, England
  - Montpelier Crescent
- Montpelier, Bristol, England
  - Montpelier railway station
- Montpellier, Cheltenham, England
- Montpellier Quarter, Harrogate, England
- Montpelier, London, England

=== United States ===
- Montpelier, Idaho
- Montpelier, Indiana
- Montpelier, Iowa
- Montpelier Township, Muscatine County, Iowa
- Montpelier, Kentucky
- Montpelier, Louisiana
- Montpelier, a mansion in Thomaston, Maine
- Montpelier, Maryland
- Montpelier (Clear Spring, Maryland), a historic house
- Montpelier Mansion (Fulton, Maryland), a historic house
- Montpelier Mansion (Laurel, Maryland), a historic house
- Montpelier, Mississippi
- Montpelier, North Dakota
- Montpelier, Ohio
- Montpelier, Vermont, capital city of the state of Vermont
  - Montpelier station (Vermont)
- Montpelier, Charles City County, Virginia
- Montpelier, Hanover County, Virginia
- Montpelier (Cabin Point, Virginia), a historic house
- Montpelier (Orange, Virginia), a historic house
- Montpelier (Sperryville, Virginia), a historic house
- Montpelier, Wisconsin
- Montpellier, U.S. Virgin Islands

=== Elsewhere ===
- Montpelier (Queensland), a hill in Australia
- Montpellier, Quebec, Canada
- Montpellier, France
  - University of Montpellier
- Montpelier, County Limerick, Ireland
- Montpelier Hill, a hill in County Dublin, Ireland
- Montpelier, Jamaica
  - Montpelier railway station, Jamaica

== People ==
- Lords of Montpellier
  - List of ladies consort of Montpellier
- Constant Montpellier (born 1961), Canadian jockey
- Luc Montpellier, Canadian cinematographer

== Sports clubs ==
- Montpelier Cricket Club, England 1796–1845
- Montpelier F.C., an Irish football club
- Montpellier Hérault Rugby, a French rugby club
- Montpellier HSC, a French football club
- Montpellier HSC (women), a French football club
- Montpellier Water Polo, multiple winners of the Championnat de France (water polo)

== Other uses ==
- USS Montpelier, the name of several ships

== See also ==
- Montpelier High School (disambiguation)
- Montpelier Historic District (disambiguation)
- Montpelier station (disambiguation)
