= Thomas Scott-Ellis, 8th Baron Howard de Walden =

British peer (1880 –1946)

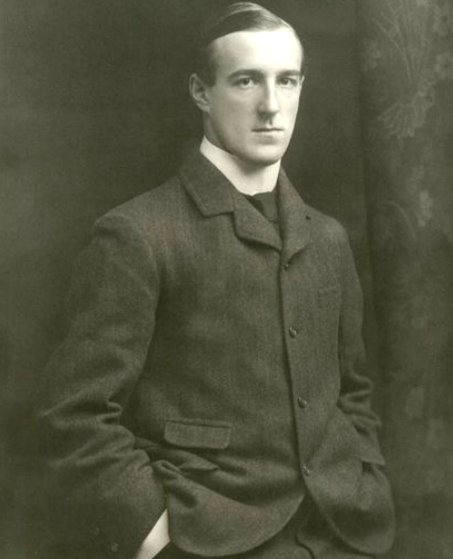
Thomas, 8th Baron Howard de Walden

Thomas Evelyn Scott-Ellis, 8th Baron Howard de Walden, 4th Baron Seaford (9 May 1880 – 5 November 1946) was an English peer, landowner, writer and patron of the arts.

Lord Howard de Walden was also a powerboat racer who competed for Great Britain in the 1908 Summer Olympics.

== Early life ==
Thomas Ellis was born in London on 9 May 1880, the only son of the 7th Baron Howard de Walden and Blanche Ellis (née Holden), daughter of William Holden the co-heir of Palace house, Lancaster. He was baptised with the name of Thomas Evelyn Ellis, and was known within his family as "Tommy". Educated at Eton College and the Royal Military College, Sandhurst, in 1917 he assumed the surname Scott-Ellis by Royal Licence.

== Military career ==
Commissioned into the 10th Hussars as a second-lieutenant on 19 April 1899, and honorary colonel of the Royal Scots Fusiliers, he saw active military service in the Second Boer War and was promoted to lieutenant on 1 April 1900. Following the end of that war, he retired from active service in August 1902. He was appointed a captain (supernumerary) in the 2nd County of London Yeomanry (Westminster Dragoons) on 13 September 1902. Scott-Ellis resumed active military service during World War I, being promoted Major in the Royal Tank Corps.

== Collecting and interests ==
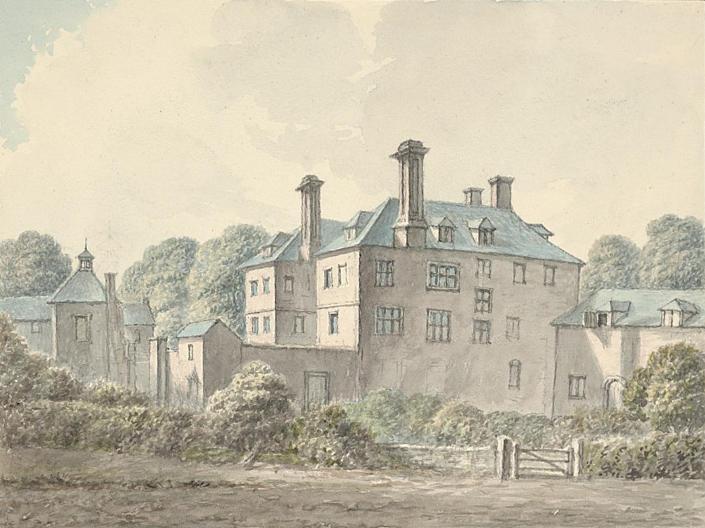
Croesnewydd Hall, Wrexham, Wales

After succeeding to his family titles in 1899 he received his inherited estates when he came of age in 1901. This included the Howard de Walden Estate in Marylebone, London and earned him the title of 'Britain's wealthiest bachelor'. His fortune derived from his grandmother's estates which she had inherited as daughter of the Duke of Portland. The relatively small Ellis family estates, built on slavery and sugar estates in Jamaica, primarily Montpelier, Jamaica had been conveyed by his grandmother to his uncle, Evelyn Henry Ellis, in 1891.

Howard de Walden took a lease on Audley End House, Essex which had once belonged to his ancestors, in 1904 but reportedly never felt settled there. The artist Auguste Rodin created a bust of him in 1906 which is held in the collection kept at the Rodin Museum in Philadelphia. He purchased Croesnewydd Hall near Wrexham in 1929 which had been the home of his ancestors; that in between leasing Chirk Castle, Denbighshire from 1911 in preparation for his marriage, which became his main residence after World War I until 1946; and where he learned the Welsh language, he also spent time at 'Plas Llanina', Ceredigion.

The Barony also inherited Dean Castle in Kilmarnock via inheritance from his grandmother, the 6th Baron's wife, 'Lady Lucy Cavendish-Scott-Bentinck'.

A great sportsman, he was back up for the British fencing team at the 'Intercalated games' at Athens, 1906. He had a passion for horse-racing, and was a member of the Jockey Club between 1905–1924. He was interested in sailing and powerboats, and as a crew member of the Dylan he participated in the first and only motor boat competitions at the Olympics of 1908 in London. His steam yacht, Branwen, 135 feet (41 m) length overall, launched 28 October 1905 was the first vessel built at the John I. Thornycroft & Company's Woolston yard.

In 1914, he provided financial support for the creation of Crab Tree Club in London and also in that year he was one of the people "blessed" in Wyndham Lewis's Blast Magazine.

Scott-Ellis had been awarded the a degree of LL.D. honoris causa by the University of Wales, he was President of the National Museum of Wales also a governor in the National Library of Wales. In addition, he was chairman of the British Empire Academy.

He had also been made a trustee of the Tate Gallery in 1938 and served as president of the Campaign for the Protection of Rural Wales from 1931 to 1945. In 1934, he served as treasurer of the Royal Salop Infirmary in Shrewsbury.

Howard de Walden became a keen heraldist and genealogist, as well as amassing one of the most extensive collections of British armour, most of which is now on display at Dean Castle, Kilmarnock.

Augustus John, in his memoirs, recalls visiting Howard de Walden at Chirk Castle and being "greatly impressed to find our host one morning, clad, cap-à-pie, in a suit of ancient armour and reading his newspaper."

Howard de Walden was also an author, who produced several operas under the pseudonym of T. E. Ellis. Ellis approached composer Joseph Holbrooke with his "Dylan - Son of the Wave". his resulted in the composition of the opera "Dylan", first performed at the Theatre Royal, Drury Lane, London, conducted by Artur Nikisch, on 4 July 1914. The staging included another technological wonder: "In this work, in order to get convincing flights of wild fowl, films were made in the Outer Hebrides and projected on to the stage. This, of course, was in the days of the silent film, when there was no means of deadening the whirr or hum of the projector and the films themselves resolved into a series of flicks. The scoring, however, was vivid enough to cover the sounds, and this incipient film music was infinitely more successful than some of the over-vaunted high-level scores heard to-day. The theatre, however, was not ready for such an innovation, and the extra-musical effects were not taken seriously." (See Joseph Holbrooke Wikipedia entry). Collaboration on two further operas, "The Children of Don" (first performed at the London Opera House, conducted by Arthur Nikisch, on 15 June 1912 - postponed from 12 June) and "Bronwen", brought about the completion of Holbrooke's most ambitious project, a trilogy under the collective title "The Cauldron of Annwn" setting Scott-Ellis' versions of tales from the Welsh "Mabinogion". Until his death in 1946, Scott-Ellis effectively acted as patron to Holbrooke, subsidising performances and publication of many of his works.His passion was to do with literature from the medieval period, especially Welsh literature. He participated in writing in the National Eisteddfod of Wales, in particular to do with the fables of the Mabinogion.

=== Dispute with John Lewis ===
John Lewis of the eponymous department store on Oxford Street engaged in a protracted legal dispute with Lord Howard de Walden, his ground landlord, over the Holles Street premises. The litigation went through the courts for twenty-three years and cost Lewis £40,000. At one point John Lewis was sent to Brixton Jail for contempt of court, and Howard de Walden sued him for libel following his erection of placards at his stores. The case was eventually settled amicably.

== Family ==
Coat of arms

In 1912 Howard de Walden married Margherita Dorothy van Raalte, herself a collector of antiquities. Their six children were:

- John Osmael Scott-Ellis, 9th Baron Howard de Walden (27 November 1912 – 9 July 1999) married firstly Irene Gräfin von Harrach, daughter of Hans-Albrecht Graf von Harrach and Helene Gräfin von und zu Arco-Zinneberg, on 21 August 1934. He married secondly, Gillian Margaret Buckley, daughter of Cyril Francis Stewart Buckley and Audrey Burmester, in 1978 (see Viscount Mountgarret)
- Hon. Bronwen Mary Scott-Ellis (b. 27 November 1912 – 2003), twin with her brother, married The Hon. James Louis Lindsay, son of the 27th Earl of Crawford and Constance Lilian Pelly, on 26 April 1933
- Hon. Elisabeth Gwendolen Scott-Ellis (b. 5 December 1914 – 1976) married, firstly, Lt-Cdr Serge Orloff-Davidoff, son of Count Alexis Orloff-Davidoff, on 24 July 1935. She married, secondly, Bernard Wheeler Robinson (died 1997), son of Dr. Wheeler Robinson, on 31 October 1959
- Hon. (Essylt) Priscilla Scott-Ellis (15 November 1916 – 8 March 1983) married José Luis de Vilallonga y Cabeza de Vaca, 9th Marquess of Castellbell, on 27 September 1945 (see Marquess of Castellbell). She married, secondly, Ian Hanson, a young opera singer from Manchester, in 1972
- Hon. (Margaret Irene) Gaenor Scott-Ellis, JP (b. 2 June 1919 – 2002) married Lieut. Richard Heathcoat-Amory, son of Lt.-Col. Harry Heathcoat-Amory JP DL and Evelyn Stanley, on 18 July 1938 (see Earl Bathurst)
- Hon. Rosemary Nest Scott-Ellis (b. 28 October 1922) married George Fitzroy Seymour JP DL, of Thrumpton, Nottinghamshire, on 1 June 1946 (see Miranda Seymour FRSL)

Lord Howard de Walden died, aged 66, on 5 November 1946 in London, being succeeded in the family titles by his eldest son, John.

== Works ==
- Some Feudal Lords and Their Seals (1903)
- Banners Standards and Badges from a Tudor Manuscript in the College of Arms (1904)
- The Children of Don: a drama in verse (1912)
- Song of Gwyn ap Nudd (1913)
- Pont Orewyn (1914)
- Lanval: a drama in four acts (1908)
- Dylan (1919)
- The Cauldron of Annwn (1922)
- The Cauldron of Annwn, including the story of Bronwen (1929)
- Five Pantomimes (1930)

== See also ==
- Baron Howard de Walden
- Baron Seaford
- House of Lords

Peerage of England
| Preceded by Frederick Ellis | Baron Howard de Walden; 1899–1946 | Succeeded by John Scott-Ellis |
Peerage of the United Kingdom
| Preceded by Frederick Ellis | Baron Seaford; 1899–1946 | Succeeded by John Scott-Ellis |
