= Charles Ellis, 1st Baron Seaford =

British politician

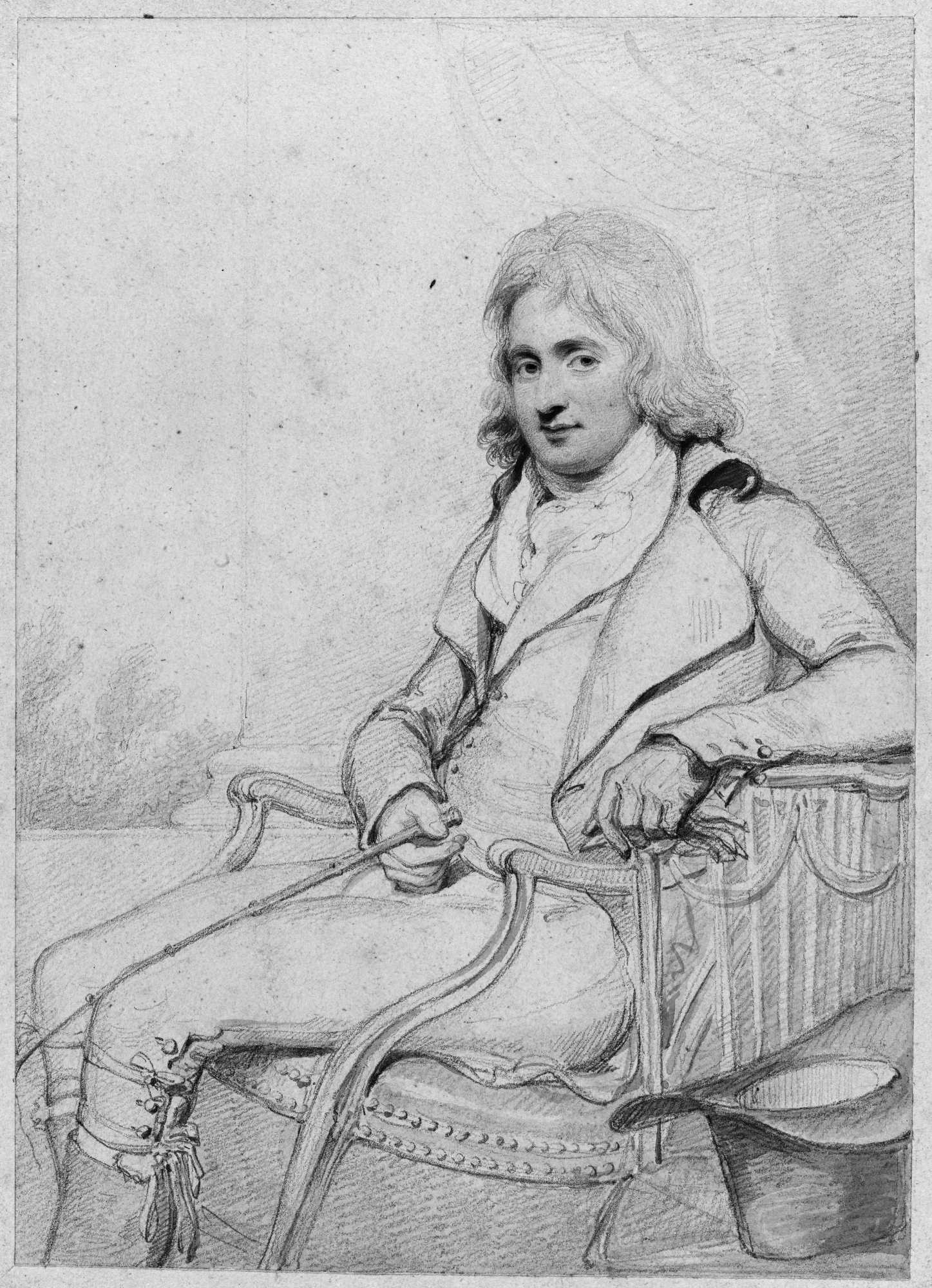
Charles Rose Ellis, 1st Baron Seaford (Richard Cosway)

Charles Rose Ellis, 1st Baron Seaford (19 December 1771 – 9 July 1845) was a British politician.

== John Ellis and Charles' early life ==
Charles was the second son of John Ellis of Jamaica, who acquired a significant amount of wealth from sugar and slavery at a number of estates, including Montpelier, Jamaica in Saint James Parish, the Newry plantation in St Mary, and the Palm estate in St Thomas-in-the-Vale. When John's brother George died young, he ran his estates on behalf of his young nephew, George Rose Ellis. However, the younger George Ellis (poet) would later complain to his maternal uncle, Edward Long, about John's avarice.

Across his six Jamaican estates, John owned over 1,200 slaves, and he was ranked among the top one percent of wealthy sugar planters in Jamaica. In 1782, John and his wife Elizabeth boarded a ship from Jamaica to England, but the ship was lost at sea, and Charles inherited his father's wealthy properties in Jamaica.

== Career as a sugar planter ==
George Rose Ellis married Anne, the daughter of Sir Peter Parker, 1st Baronet, but George died without issue in 1815, and his property passed to Charles. Charles was educated at Christ Church, Oxford, and he became an absentee planter based in England. Charles inherited the Montpelier estate, while his older brother, also named John, inherited their father's properties in the parishes of St Mary and St George.

John married another daughter of Parker, named Antoinette, but died heavily in debt in 1832, and his properties were acquired by Charles. When the British government emancipated the slaves in the 1830s, Charles was compensated for his liberated slaves to the tune of over £18,000.

== Political career ==
Charles Ellis was elected to the House of Commons for Heytesbury in 1793, a seat he held until 1796, and then represented Seaford from 1796 to 1806 and from 1812 to 1826 and East Grinstead from 1807 to 1812. In 1826 he was raised to the peerage as Baron Seaford, of Seaford in the County of Sussex.

In the Parliament of the United Kingdom, Ellis was a prominent defender of slavery in the West Indies plantations. He was for many years considered to be the head of West India Interest, the lobby of planters and merchants in the British parliament who opposed the abolitionists.

Ellis served as his colleague and friend Foreign Secretary George Canning's second in his duel with Secretary of State for War and the Colonies Viscount Castlereagh in 1809. The duel occurred because both Canning and Castlereagh wished to succeed the Duke of Portland as Prime Minister and because Castlereagh blamed Canning for his impending dismissal from the War Office. After two rounds in which Canning was wounded and Castlereagh was grazed by a bullet, Ellis and Castlereagh's second the Earl of Yarmouth intervened to stop a third round.

== Emancipation and imported labour ==
In 1832, Ellis was in Jamaica during a slave rebellion led by Samuel Sharpe, the Baptist War resulted in Ellis suffering losses on his sugar plantations to the tune of about £41,000. Lord Seaford left Jamaica for Britain in the middle of 1834, just before the Apprenticeship period was implemented following the emancipation of the slaves.

According to the Legacies of British Slave-Ownership at the University College London, Seaford was awarded compensation in the aftermath of the Slavery Abolition Act 1833 with the Slave Compensation Act 1837.

Seaford was awarded over £18,000 compensation for the emancipation of 146 enslaved people on Shettlewood Pen, 70 in Crawle Pen, 153 in Caymanas, 276 in New Montpelier, and 373 in Old Montpelier. A total of 1,018 enslaved people were freed from Seaford's estates.

Lord Seaford was not convinced that the Apprenticeship would work, and he was a great believer in encouraging white European immigration to Jamaica. To this end, he donated land from his Montpelier estate, which was used to create a village for recently arrived German immigrants, called Seaford Town, Jamaica after him.

== Death and legacy ==
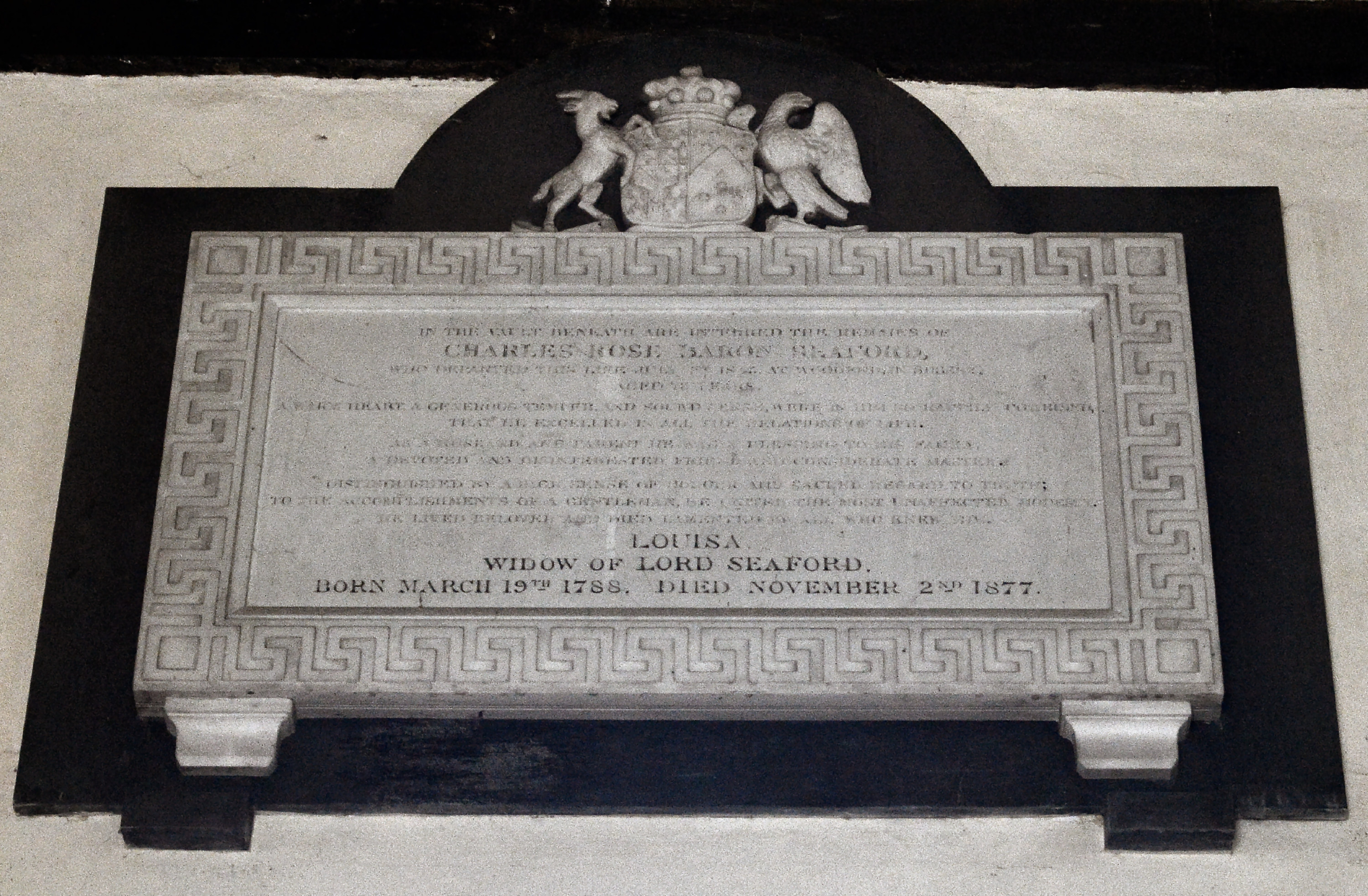
Memorial in St Georges Church, Esher

Lord Seaford died 9 July 1845. He had married the Hon. Elizabeth Catherine Caroline Hervey, daughter of John Hervey, Lord Hervey, eldest son of Frederick Hervey, 4th Earl of Bristol, in 1798. She died in January 1803, aged 22. They had 2 sons and a daughter.

In 1803 their four-year-old son and heir Charles succeeded his great-grandfather Lord Bristol as sixth Baron Howard de Walden. Their second son was the army officer Augustus Frederick Ellis.

There is a memorial in St George's Church, Esher for Charles and his second wife, Louisa, who died 1877.

Parliament of Great Britain
| Preceded by William Eden; The Earl of Barrymore | Member of Parliament for Heytesbury; 1793–1796; With: William Eden 1793; The Viscount Clifden 1793–96 | Succeeded by The Viscount Clifden; Sir John Leicester |
| Preceded by John Tarleton; Richard Paul Jodrell | Member of Parliament for Seaford; 1796–1800; With: George Ellis | Parliament of Great Britain abolished |
Parliament of the United Kingdom
| New parliament | Member of Parliament for Seaford; 1801–1806; With: George Ellis to 1802; Richard Joseph Sullivan 1802–06; John Leach 1806 | Succeeded by John Leach; George Hibbert |
| Preceded by Sir Henry Strachey; Daniel Giles | Member of Parliament for East Grinstead; 1807–1812; With: Sir Nathaniel Holland 1807–12; Richard Wellesley 1812; George William Gunning 1812; Nicholas Vansittart 1812 | Succeeded by George William Gunning; James Stephen |
| Preceded by John Leach; George Hibbert | Member of Parliament for Seaford; 1812–1826; With: John Leach 1812–16; Sir Charles Cockerell 1816–18; George Watson-Taylor 1818–20; George Agar-Ellis 1820–26 | Succeeded by John Fitzgerald; Augustus Frederick Ellis |
Peerage of the United Kingdom
| New creation | Baron Seaford; 1826–1845 | Succeeded by Charles Augustus Ellis |
