= Priscilla Scott-Ellis =

British diarist (1916–1983)

Pip Scott-Ellis
- Born: Esyllt Priscilla Scott-Ellis; 15 November 1916; London, England
- Died: 8 March 1983 (aged 66); Los Angeles, U.S.
- Education: Queen's College, London, and private tutors
- Known for: her diaries kept as a Nationalist volunteer during the Spanish Civil War
- Spouse(s): José Luis de Vilallonga y Cabeza de Vaca, 9th Marquess of Castellbell; Ian Hanson
- Children: 2
- Parent(s): Margherita (born van Raalte) and Thomas Scott-Ellis, 8th Baron Howard de Walden

Hon. Esyllt Priscilla "Pip" Scott-Ellis (15 November 1916 – 8 March 1983) was a British diarist. She was one of only two women who volunteered to be nurses for the Nationalists during the Spanish Civil War.

== Life ==
Ellis was born in Seaford House in Belgravia in 1916. She was the daughter of Margherita (born van Raalte) and Thomas Scott-Ellis, 8th Baron Howard de Walden. She was educated at Queen's College, London, privately, at Benenden School and at a finishing school in Paris. Her siblings were Elisabeth Gwendolen (later Robinson) (1914–1976), Hon. Bronwen Mary (later Lindsay) (1912–2003) and John Scott-Ellis, 9th Baron Howard de Walden (1912–1999).

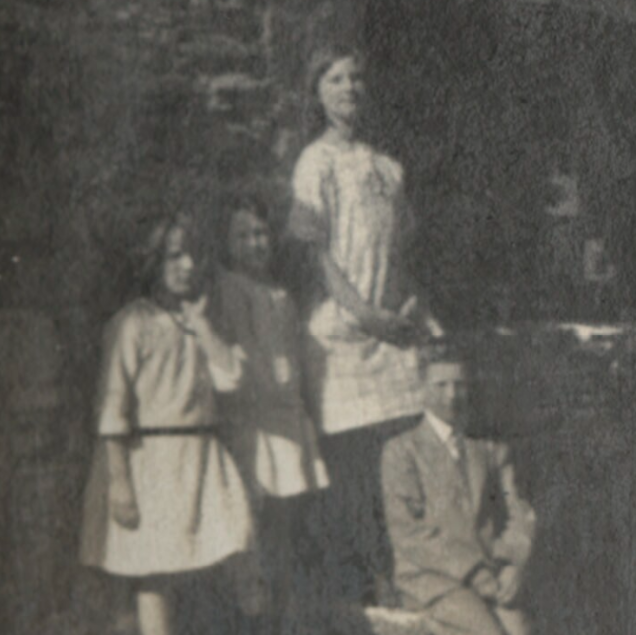
Elizabeth, Pip, Bronwen and John - the Scott-Ellis children in 1923 by Lady Ottoline Morrell

It is said that her parents gave her only a small amount of their time and attention and she described as eager to please. She was obsessed with Prince Ataúlfo de Orleans who was a closet homosexual. He volunteered to be sent from Nazi Germany in the Condor Legion to support the Nationalist forces in Spain. Ellis wanted to be close to him.

In 1937 she found out that her friend had volunteered to serve as a nurse to support the Nationalist forces during the Spanish Civil War. She decided that she would do the same and after basic training she was in Spain in October 1937. While she was working as a nurse she wrote a diary noting the wounds, the screaming and the casual approach to sterilisation.

She met diplomat José Luis de Vilallonga y Cabeza de Vaca, 9th Marquess of Castellbell, in January 1944 and they married at Sanlúcar de Barrameda on 20 September 1945. Her family did not approve and none of them could attend the wedding. Jose's father-in-law was so unimpressed by him that he had his will changed in the faint hope of protecting his daughter's inheritance. After their marriage her husband left the Spanish diplomatic service and they lived abroad.

She married, secondly, Ian Hanson, a young opera singer from Manchester, in 1972.

== Death and legacy ==
Ellis died in 1983 in Los Angeles. Her diary which she had started to edit for publication in 1939 became The Chances of Death. This book was published in 1995 after it was edited by the historian Sir Raymond Carr.
