= John Scott-Ellis, 9th Baron Howard de Walden =

British peer, landowner and Thoroughbred racehorse owner/breeder

The Right Honourable The Lord Howard de Walden TD
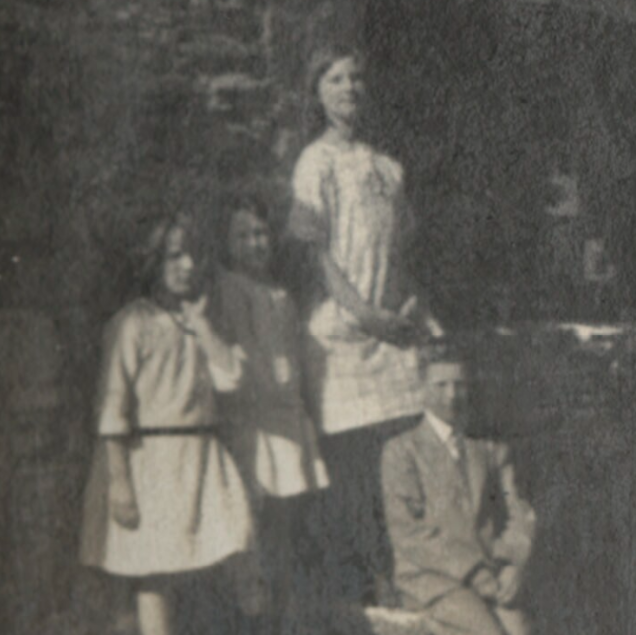
- Elizabeth, Pip, Bronwen and John – the Scott-Ellis children in 1923 by Lady Ottoline Morrell

Member of the House of Lords
- Lord Temporal
- In office 5 November 1946 – 10 July 1999
- Preceded by: The 8th Baron Howard de Walden
- Succeeded by: The 10th Baroness Howard de Walden

Personal details
- Born: John Osmael Scott-Ellis; 27 November 1912
- Died: 12 July 1999 (aged 86)

John Osmael Scott-Ellis, 9th Baron Howard de Walden, 5th Baron Seaford (27 November 1912 – 10 July 1999), was a British hereditary peer, landowner, and a Thoroughbred racehorse owner and breeder.

== Life ==
He was the son of Margarita Dorothy van Raalte (1890–1974) and her husband, Thomas Scott-Ellis, 8th Baron Howard de Walden, whose London home was Seaford House in Belgravia; and he was educated at Eton College and Magdalene College, Cambridge.

In 1931, he moved to Munich to learn a language. He bought a car and claimed that on his first day behind the wheel, he knocked over a pedestrian. The man's injuries were slight, apologies were made, and the two shook hands. As he drove away, Scott-Ellis's passenger told him, "Don't you know you just knocked down Adolf Hitler?"

He served in the Territorial Army in the Westminster Dragoons, rising to the rank of major.

He inherited Dean Castle in Kilmarnock, East Ayrshire, Scotland, which, along with his father's collections of arms and armour and his grandfather's collection of musical instruments, he gave to the people of Kilmarnock in 1975.

== Marriage and family ==
He married Countess Irene von Harrach in 1934. On their honeymoon in 1934, he met Hitler at a concert and spoke of his driving incident.

He and his wife had four daughters:

- Hon. (Mary) Hazel Caridwen (12 August 1935 – 13 July 2024), the future 10th Baroness
- Hon. Susan Buchan (b. 6 October 1937)
- Hon. Jessica White (b. 6 August 1941)
- Hon. Camilla Acloque (b. 1 April 1947)

Lady Howard de Walden died in 1975, and in 1978, Lord Howard de Walden married Gillian, Lady Mountgarret (née Buckley), 25 years his junior.

Through his sister Rosemary he was an uncle of the writer Miranda Seymour.

== Thoroughbred racing ==
Lord Howard de Walden became involved in the sport of Thoroughbred racing immediately after World War II. In 1958, he bought Lord Derby's Plantation Stud at Exning, just outside Newmarket. A steward of the Jockey Club, he had success in National Hunt hurdle racing with Champion Hurdle winner, Lanzarote.

On the flat, he won the 1985 Epsom Derby with Slip Anchor. Lord Howard de Walden met with considerable success both on the track and in the breeding shed with Kris, who was the 1979 Champion European Miler and 1980 Champion European Older Miler, and who went on to become the Leading sire in Great Britain and Ireland in 1985.

== Notes ==
Peerage of England
Preceded by Thomas Scott-Ellis	Baron Howard de Walden; 1946–1999; Member of the House of Lords (1946–1999)	Succeeded by Hazel Czernin
Peerage of the United Kingdom
Preceded by Thomas Scott-Ellis	Baron Seaford; 1946–1999	Succeeded by Colin Ellis
