= Vicente Sartorius, 4th Marquess of Mariño =

Spanish nobleman and Olympic bobsledder (1931–2002)

Vicente Sartorius y Cabeza de Vaca
- Marquess of Mariño
- Born: 20 November 1931; Madrid, Spain
- Died: 22 July 2002 (aged 70); Ibiza, Spain
- Buried: 24 July 2002
- Noble family: Sartorius
- Spouses: Isabel Zorraquín y de Corral (m. 1964; div. 1974) Princess Nora of Liechtenstein (m. 1988)
- Issue: Isabel Sartorius y Zorraquín; Cecilia Sartorius y Zorraquín; Luis José Sartorius y Zorraquín, 5th Marquess of Mariño; María Teresa Sartorius y de Liechtenstein
- Father: Carlos Sartorius y Díaz de Mendoza
- Mother: María de Lourdes Cabeza de Vaca y Carvajal

Vicente Sartorius y Cabeza de Vaca, 4th Marquess of Mariño (20 November 1931 – 22 July 2002) was a Spanish nobleman and Olympic bobsledder. He was born in Madrid.

== Bobsledding career ==
In the 1950s, Sartorius had a professional bobsled career. He competed in the 1956 Winter Olympics in Cortina d'Ampezzo, finishing fourth in the two-man event and ninth in the four-man event.

== Personal life ==
He was the second child and son of Carlos Sartorius y Díaz de Mendoza (1898–1966) and his first wife, María de Lourdes Cabeza de Vaca y Carvajal (1903–1940). Through his father he was a great-grandson of Luis José Sartorius, 1st Count de San Luis, who was Prime Minister of Spain from 1853 to 1854, during the reign of Queen Isabella II. By his mother´s family side he was a first cousin of both the Marquess of Portago known as Alfonso de Portago and of the actor and writer Jose Luis de Villallonga y Cabeza de Vaca, 9th Marquess of Castellbell.

After the death of his elder brother, Antonio Sartorius y Cabeza de Vaca, 3rd Marquess of Mariño, on 24 December 1976, he succeeded as the 4th Marquess of Mariño.

Sartorius married first Isabel Zorraquín y de Corral (1940–2009) from Argentina on 24 April 1964 at the Basilica of Our Lady of the Pillar, Buenos Aires; they later divorced in 1974 (since the Marquess remarried in the Catholic Church in 1988, it should be supposed that his first marriage got a canonical annulment before that date). Together they had three children, two daughters and one son:

- Isabel Sartorius y Zorraquín (born in Madrid in 1965); after the divorce of her parents, when her mother remarried in 1978, she went to live with her in Lima, Peru. She later studied in Washington, DC. She had a relationship around 1989 to 1991 with Felipe, Prince of Asturias. Isabel says that the relationship ended because both were very young, and he adds that Queen Sofía was always very supportive. She later had a relationship with Javier de Soto y FitzJames-Stuart, a descendant of James II of England via his son, James FitzJames, with whom she had a daughter, Mencía de Soto y Sartorius, who was born on 25 July 1997 at Madrid, Spain.
  - In February 2012, Isabel published her memoirs, titled Por ti lo haría mil veces, which translated means For you I would do it a thousand times. In them she refers to her relationship with her mother through the times when her mother was addicted to cocaine.
- Cecilia Sartorius y Zorraquín (born 1967), who married on 30 June 1990 Federico Green from Argentina. They had three children: Marcos Bartolomé, Pablo Federico and Antonia.
- Luis José Sartorius y Zorraquín, 5th Marquess of Mariño (born 1970); became the new marquess upon his father's death in 2002. He has a relationship with Bárbara Pérez Manzarbeitia, and they have one son, Vicente (born 2011), and one daughter, Isabel (born 2012). They married on 22 June 2013.

Secondly in 1988, he married Princess Nora of Liechtenstein (born 1950) at St. Florin's in Vaduz. With the princess he had one daughter:

- María Teresa Sartorius y de Liechtenstein (born November 1992).

Sartorius died of a heart attack during holiday in Ibiza, Spain. He was buried two days later.

Spanish nobility
Preceded by Antonio Sartorius y Cabeza de Vaca	Marquess of Mariño; 1976–2002	Succeeded by Luis José Sartorius y Zorraquín
