= Montpelier station =

Montpelier station or Montpellier station may refer to:

== Places ==
- Montpelier Station, Virginia, U.S.

== Railway stations ==
- Montpelier railway station, in Bristol, England
- Montpelier railway station, Jamaica
- Montpelier station (Vermont), U.S.
- Montpellier station (REM), in Montreal, Canada
- Montpellier-Saint-Roch station, in Montpellier, France

== See also ==
- Montpelier (disambiguation)
