= Princess Nora of Liechtenstein =

Princess of Liechtenstein

Princess Nora
- Marchioness of Mariño
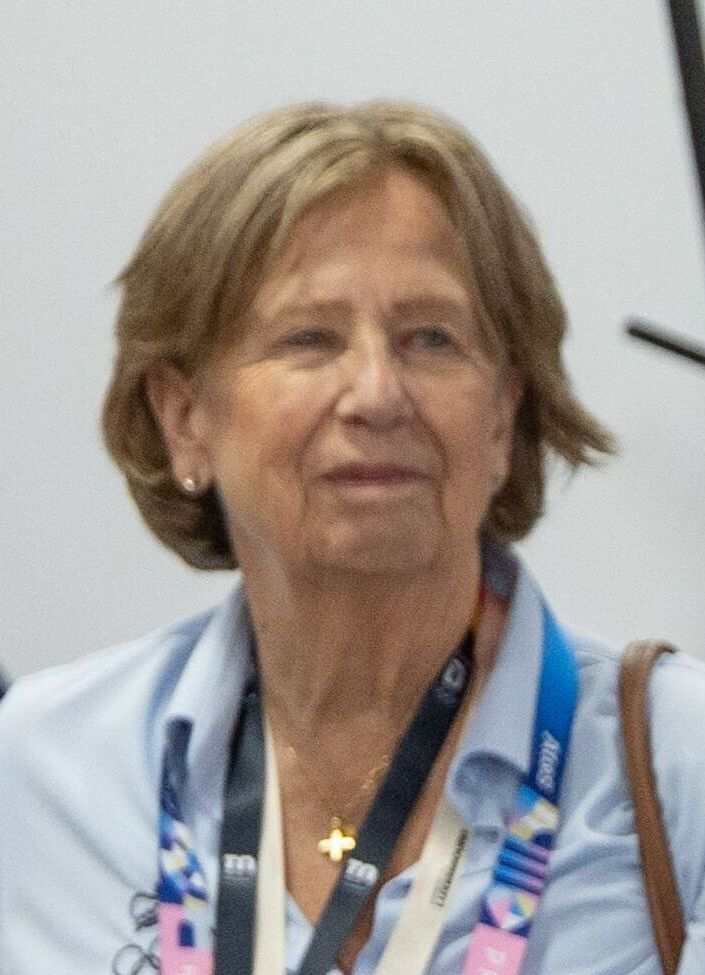
- Princess Nora in 2024
- Born: 31 October 1950 (age 75); Zürich, Switzerland
- Spouse: Vicente Sartorius y Cabeza de Vaca, Marqués de Mariño (m. 1988; died 2002)
- Issue: María Teresa Sartorius y de Liechtenstein
Names
- Norberta Elisabeth Maria Assunta Josefine Georgine et omnes sancti
- House: Liechtenstein
- Father: Franz Joseph II, Prince of Liechtenstein
- Mother: Countess Georgina von Wilczek

Styles of Princess Nora of Liechtenstein
- Reference style: Her Serene Highness
- Spoken style: Your Serene Highness

Princess Norberta of Liechtenstein, Marchioness of Mariño (née Norberta Elisabeth Maria Assunta Josefine Georgine et omnes sancti; 31 October 1950), popularly known as Princess Nora, is a member of Liechtenstein princely family. She is the fourth child and only daughter of Franz Joseph II, Prince of Liechtenstein and his wife Georgina von Wilczek, and the younger sister of Hans-Adam II, Prince of Liechtenstein.

== Education and career ==
Princess Nora studied at the University of Geneva and the Graduate Institute of International and Development Studies, also in Geneva. She has worked for the World Bank and the International Institute for Environment and Development, among others. She speaks French, English, German and Spanish.

She has been a member of the International Olympic Committee since 1984. She was president of Liechtenstein's National Olympic Committee from 1982 to 1992 and she has been president of Special Olympics Liechtenstein since 2002.

She was Chief Scouting Guide (German: Korpsführerin) of Liechtensteinische Pfadfinderinnenkorps Santa Maria from 1973 to 1989. Today, she is Honorary member of the Scout association.

== Family ==
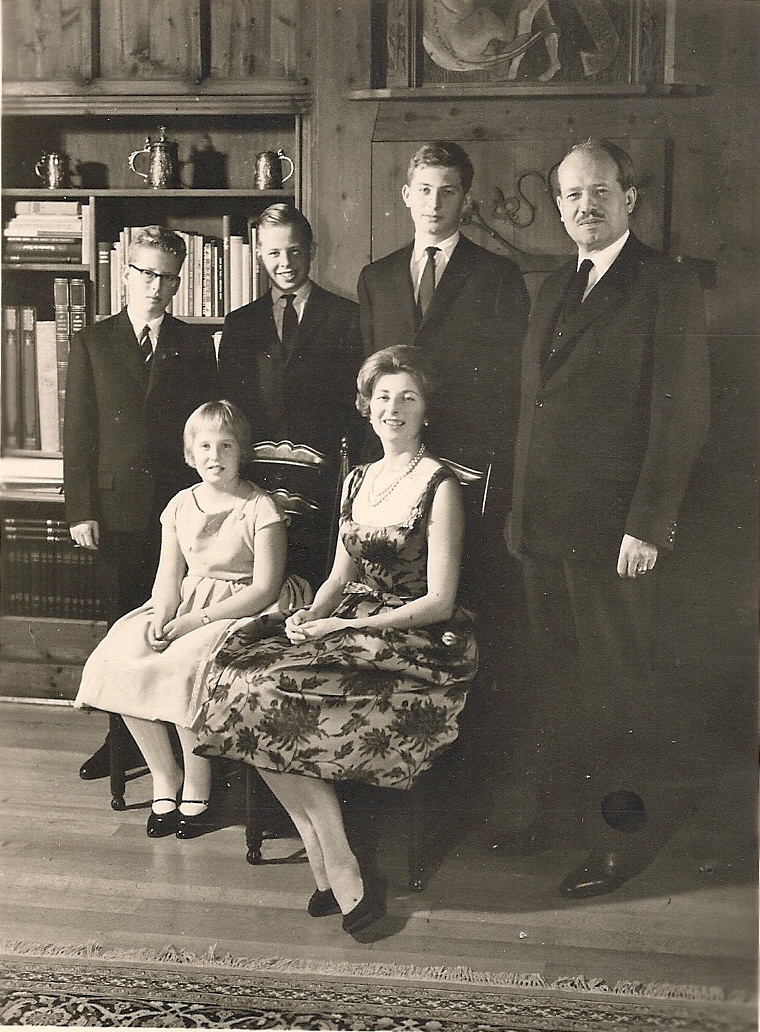
Princess Nora with her family in 1955.

On 11 June 1988, she married Don Vicente Sartorius y Cabeza de Vaca, Marqués de Mariño (Madrid, 20 November 1931 – Ibiza, 22 July 2002), member of the Spanish nobility, at St. Florin's in Vaduz. Together they had one daughter named Doña María Teresa Sartorius y de Liechtenstein who was born on 21 November 1992.

She is the godmother of Princess Laetitia Maria of Belgium, Archduchess of Austria-Este, the third daughter of Princess Astrid of Belgium.

== Honours ==
=== National honours ===
- Liechtenstein : Commemorative Medal on the Occasion of the 70th Birthday of His Serene Highness Prince Franz Joseph II (16/08/1976).

== See also ==
- Princely Family of Liechtenstein
