= Howard de Walden Estate =

London aristocratic property estate

Coordinates: 51.5179°N 0.1470°W

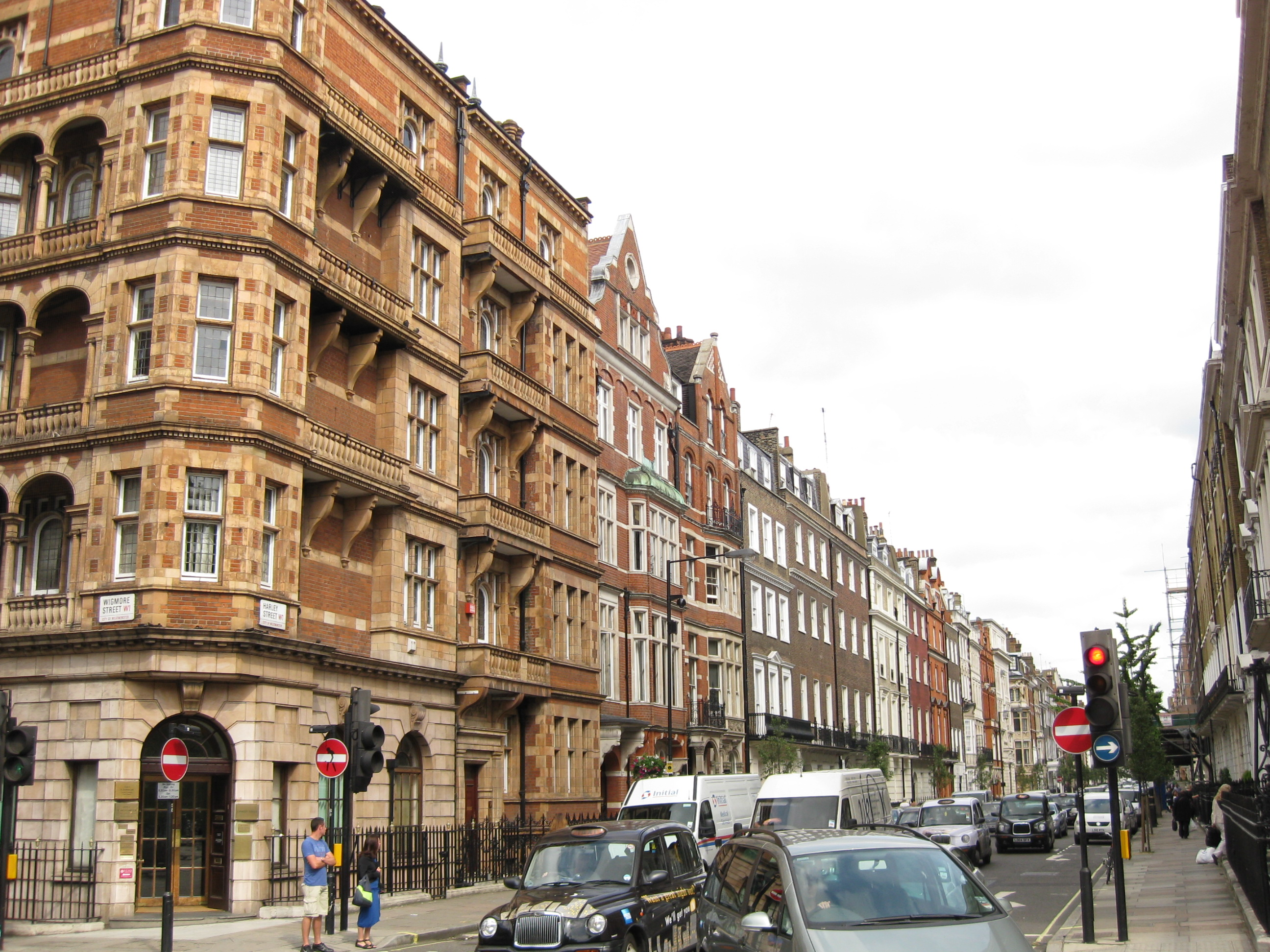
Harley Street and Wigmore Street are part of the Estate.

The Howard de Walden Estate is a property estate in Marylebone, London, owned by the Howard de Walden family. As of 2020 the estate was reported to be worth £4.7 billion.

== History ==
The estate's development dates from 1715 when speculative planning of Cavendish Square in London, and the streets around it began. The Marylebone manor and estate was purchased by John Holles, 1st Duke of Newcastle in 1711. Dying soon after, the estate passed to his daughter Henrietta Holles who married Edward Harley, heir of the Earl of Oxford, in 1713. Both Edward's father and uncle were active and influential in English politics during Queen Anne's reign and it seems that his uncle Edward was behind the appointment of a steward and surveyor to begin marking out building plots and negotiating leases on Henrietta's Marylebone estate. In 1719 the surveyor John Prince published a plan of the estate showing named roads and building sites which is still recognisable today. Thus began a programme of building fashionable properties extending north from Tyburn Road, renamed Oxford Street, as far as what is now Regents Park, taking in the old village of Marylebone on the west and the newly built Cleveland Street on the east.

The estate was inherited by Henrietta and Edward's only child, a daughter, Margaret Cavendish-Harley, who in 1734 had married William Bentinck, 2nd Duke of Portland. The building continued and it became known as the Portland Estate, passing through successive Dukes. In 1879, John Bentinck, 5th Duke of Portland died without issue and his estates were divided between his sisters (according to the terms of the 4th Duke's will) and his cousin, who succeeded him as the 6th Duke. The London estate was inherited jointly by two ageing sisters but from 1889 was held solely by the last surviving sister, Lucy. She was the widow of Charles Ellis, 6th Baron Howard de Walden and died in 1899 leaving the valuable Marylebone estate to her eldest son Frederick.

Since that time it has been known as The Howard de Walden Estate. In 1963 the management of the estate changed and became, as it is today, a Limited Company beneficially owned by members of the Howard de Walden family. The Estate Office at 23 Queen Anne Street was purpose built in 1882 and was rebuilt in 1937 and again in 2020.

== Property ==
The main portion of the Marylebone Estate purchased by the Duke of Newcastle in 1711 covered 203 acres and so it remained until the twentieth century. Various factors, including an infamous legal dispute with John Lewis 1900–1911, led to retraction of the estate in the inter-war period. A scheme granting 999 year leases to tenants, which effectively allowed enfranchisement, led to the loss of properties between Wigmore Street and Oxford Street. This together with the sale in 1925 of 40 acres on the eastern part of the estate to the Sir John Ellerman's Audley Trust (now owned by the Langham Estate) had the effect of reducing the size of the estate by half. Leasehold enfranchisements allowed under late twentieth century legislation continue to chip away at the original estate.

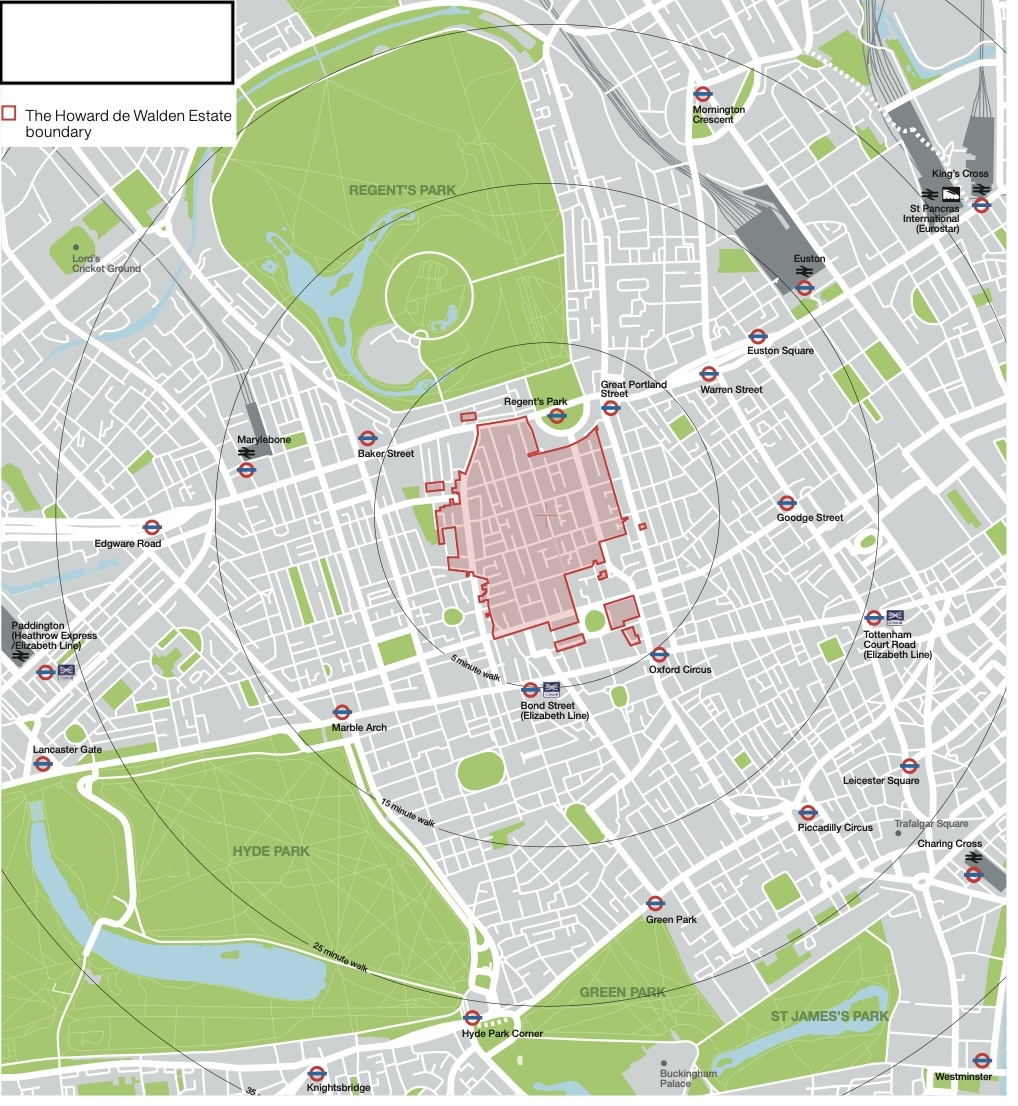
Howard de Walden Estate Map 2020 comprising 92 acres.

The Howard de Walden Estate now extends to 95 acres in which it holds the freehold to over 800 properties. The buildings on the estate fall into five categories – medical, residential, office, retail/restaurant and education. Properties are let on long- and short-term market rent leases, with 2,200 active lease agreements in 2018. The main area today extends from Marylebone Road in the north to Wigmore Street in the south, and from Hallam Street in the east to Marylebone High Street in the west.

In the 1990s the company took steps to revitalise the Marylebone High Street, adding new shops including The Conran Shop department store and Waitrose supermarket. This accompanied a drive to buy back the leases to shops on the High Street with a view to creating a more attractive shopping destination. Two further initiatives were taken in the early 21st century: the creation of healthcare hub the Harley Street Health District and the launch of Marylebone Village as a retail and leisure destination.

== See also ==
- 110 and 112 Harley Street
- Bedford Estate (Bloomsbury)
- Cadogan Estates (Chelsea)
- Grosvenor Estate
- Kingston House Estate (Knightsbridge)
- Pettiward Estate (Putney and West Brompton)
- Portman Estate (Marylebone)
- Smith's Charity Estate (South Kensington)
