= Frederick Ellis, 7th Baron Howard de Walden =

British peer and landowner (1830–1899)

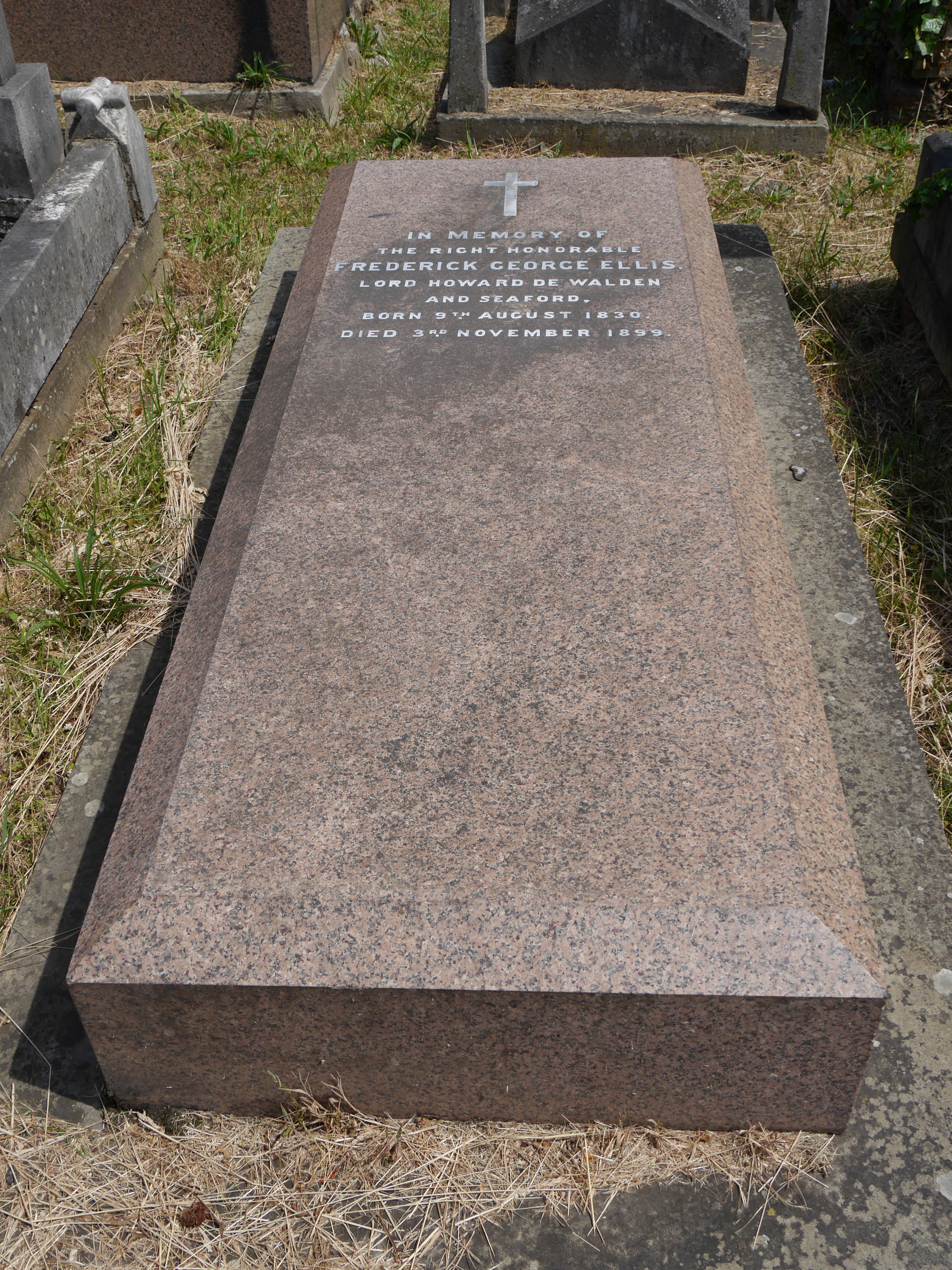
Monument, Kensal Green Cemetery

Frederick George Ellis, 7th Baron Howard de Walden and 3rd Baron Seaford (9 August 1830 – 3 November 1899), was a British landowner and at one point "the wealthiest peer in England".

== Life ==
Frederick was the son of Charles Ellis, 6th Baron Howard de Walden and his wife, Lady Lucy Cavendish-Scott-Bentinck, daughter of William Cavendish-Scott-Bentinck, 4th Duke of Portland. He attended Eton College and Trinity College, Cambridge. As a young man, Frederick assisted his father in overseeing the family's holdings of Jamaican sugar plantations. He visited Jamaica in 1846 and 1853–1834, installing new machinery in an attempt to boost falling sugar production. However, this was abandoned in 1855 and Frederick seems to have lost interest in the Jamaican estates, preferring to pursue a military career.

By 1867, Frederick had become a major in the 4th Light Dragoons. He succeeded his father in the baronies of Howard de Walden and Seaford on the latter's death on 29 August 1868. He also inherited his father's indebted estate. Frederick's mother, Lucy, undertook to discharge her late husband's debts in return for title to the plantations which Frederick conveyed to her in 1872. Having in some measure restored the Jamaican estates, now used for pasture and livestock instead of sugar, she gave them to her youngest son and Frederick's brother, Evelyn Henry in 1891. Thus they passed out of the main Howard de Walden line and were sold by Evelyn in 1912.

Frederick and his younger brother William realized the worth of the Marylebone estate of the Duke of Portland and lands in Ayrshire owned by the Duchess of Portland and that, on the death of the current Duke (who was childless) they would pass first to their mother, Lucy, and her childless sister, Viscountess Ossington. This happened in 1879 when the Duke of Portland died. William married and had a son in 1875, but Frederick foiled his hopes by marrying, at the age of forty six, a young girl twenty five years his junior.

In 1876, Frederick married Blanche, daughter of William Holden. In 1880, they had a son, Thomas Evelyn.

In 1893, Blanche sued for divorce and Lord Howard de Walden countersued, in what was viewed as the "cause celebre of the year". Frederick accused Blanche of "undue intimacy" with Count Jenan de Madre of Paris and Captain Winter. Blanche alleged cruelty by her husband as grounds for separation and her counsel cited physical abuse by Frederick, allegations of theft he made against Blanche, and threats to shoot her. According to press reports of the trial, "he frequently returned home drunk and vomited in bed, and developed filthy and hoggish habits, preventing Lady Blanche from sleeping with him."

Frederick's mother died on 29 July 1899, and he inherited the Marylebone and Ayrshire estates, making him for a little more than three months "the wealthiest peer in England".

Lord Howard de Walden died on 3 November 1899, aged 69, and was succeeded by his son Thomas. He is buried at Kensal Green Cemetery. Lady Blanche married Henry Lopes, 2nd Baron Ludlow in 1903 and she lived until 1911.

Political offices
Peerage of England
Preceded by Charles Augustus Ellis	Baron Howard de Walden; 1868–1899	Succeeded by Thomas Evelyn Scott-Ellis
Peerage of the United Kingdom
Preceded by Charles Augustus Ellis	Baron Seaford; 1868–1899	Succeeded by Thomas Evelyn Scott-Ellis
