= John Leach (judge) =

English judge

The Right Honourable Sir John Leach
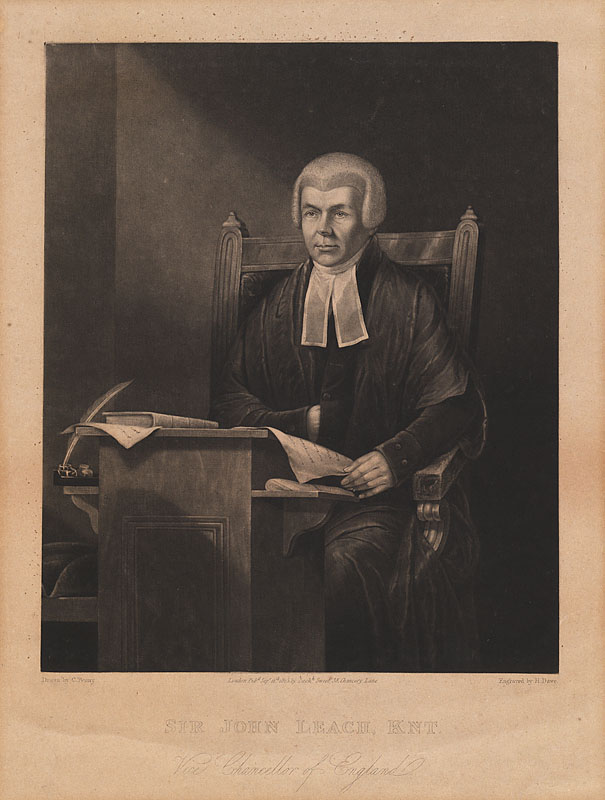
- Sir John Leach, engraving by Henry Dawe

Master of the Rolls
- Preceded by: Sir John Copley
- Succeeded by: Sir Charles Pepys

Personal details
- Born: 28 August 1760 Bedford
- Died: 14 September 1834 (aged 74) Edinburgh

Sir John Leach (28 August 1760 – 14 September 1834) was an English judge, and Master of the Rolls.

== Life ==
The son of Richard Leach, a coppersmith of Bedford, he was born in that town on 28 August 1760. After leaving Bedford School he became a pupil of Sir Robert Taylor the architect. In his office he is said to have made the working drawings for the erection of Stone Buildings, which are still preserved at Lincoln's Inn, and to have designed Howletts, in the parish of Bekesbourne, Kent. On the recommendation of his old fellow-pupil, Samuel Pepys Cockerell, and other friends, Leach abandoned architecture for the law, and was admitted a student of the Middle Temple on 26 January 1785.

Having studied of conveyancing and equity drafting in the chambers of William Alexander, he was called to the bar in Hilary term 1790, and joined the home circuit and Surrey sessions. In 1792 he was engaged as counsel in the Seaford election petition, and in 1795 was elected recorder of that Cinque port. Having previously purchased the Pelham interest, he unsuccessfully contested the constituency against Charles Rose Ellis and Ellis's cousin, George Ellis, at the general election in May 1796. In 1800 Leach gave up all common law work, and confined himself to the equity courts, where his pleadings and terse style of speaking secured him an extensive business.

At a by-election in July 1806, he was returned for Seaford, but owing to the prorogation did not take his seat in that parliament. He was again returned at the general election in the following October, and continued to represent Seaford until his retirement from parliamentary life in 1816. In Hilary term 1807 Leach was made a king's counsel, and was subsequently elected a bencher of the Middle Temple. Leach spoke rarely in the House of Commons. In March 1809 he defended the conduct of the Duke of York and Albany, and on 31 December 1810 supported William Lamb's amendment to the first regency resolution (ib. xviii. 532–45). In 1811 he carried through the House of Commons the Foreign Ministers' Pension Bill. On 15 February 1813 he strongly protested against the bill for the creation of a vice-chancellor, the effect of which he maintained would be to make the lord chancellor a political rather than a judicial character; and on 31 May 1815 he strenuously opposed Lord Althorp's motion for an inquiry into the expenditure of £100,000 granted by parliament for the outfit of the Prince Regent.

Early in February 1816, Leach vacated his seat in the House of Commons by accepting the Chiltern Hundreds, and was immediately afterwards appointed by the Prince Regent as Chancellor of the Duchy of Cornwall. In August 1817 he became chief justice of Chester, in succession to Sir William Garrow. Resigning these posts, he succeeded Sir Thomas Plumer as vice-chancellor of England in January 1818, and having been sworn a member of the Privy Council on 30 December 1817, was knighted in the following month. On John Copley becoming lord chancellor Leach was appointed master of the rolls (3 May 1827), and, by a commission dated 5 May 1827, was made deputy-speaker of the House of Lords. By an act of parliament passed in August 1833 Leach became, by virtue of his office as Master of the Rolls, a member of the Judicial Committee of the Privy Council.

He died at Simpson's Hotel in Edinburgh on 14 September 1834, aged 74, and was buried on 20 September 1834, in William Adam's mausoleum in Greyfriars Kirkyard.

== Assessment ==
Leach's decisions were lucid and brief, but as he often decided on his own judgment in preference to that of his predecessors, they were not infrequently over-ruled. His demeanour on the bench brought him into constant collision with members of the bar. While he was master of the rolls the customary evening sittings of the court were abandoned, and on 22 June 1829 the practice of sitting in the daytime began. Though Leach was professedly a Whig when he entered Parliament, he adopted the politics of the Regent, whose confidential adviser he had become. At his instigation the Milan commission was instituted in 1818 to investigate the conduct of the Princess of Wales; he was strongly in favour of a divorce. Some of Leach's equity pleadings, signed 'J. L.,' were printed in F. M. Van Heythuysen's 'Equity Draftsman' (London, 1816, 8vo). His speech of 31 December 1810 on the regency resolutions was published in 1811 (London, 8vo, second edition). He was created D.C.L. by the university of Oxford on 5 July 1810.

== Family ==
He never married. His nephew, Richard Howell Leach, a son of his youngest brother, Thomas Leach, was the senior chancery registrar from 1868 to 1882.

Parliament of the United Kingdom
Preceded by Charles Rose Ellis; Richard Joseph Sullivan	Member of Parliament for Seaford; 1806–1816; With: Charles Rose Ellis to 1806; George Hibbert 1806–12; Charles Rose Ellis from 1812	Succeeded by Charles Rose Ellis; Sir Charles Cockerell
Political offices
Preceded by William Adam	Chancellor of the Duchy of Cornwall; 1816–1818	Succeeded by vacant?
Legal offices
Preceded by Sir William Garrow	Chief Justice of Chester; 1817	Succeeded by William Draper Best
Preceded by Sir Thomas Plumer	Vice-Chancellor of England; 1818–1827	Succeeded by Unknown
Preceded by Sir John Copley	Master of the Rolls; 1827–1834	Succeeded by Sir Charles Pepys
