= Prince Ataúlfo of Orléans =

Spanish prince (1913–1974)

Prince Ataúlfo
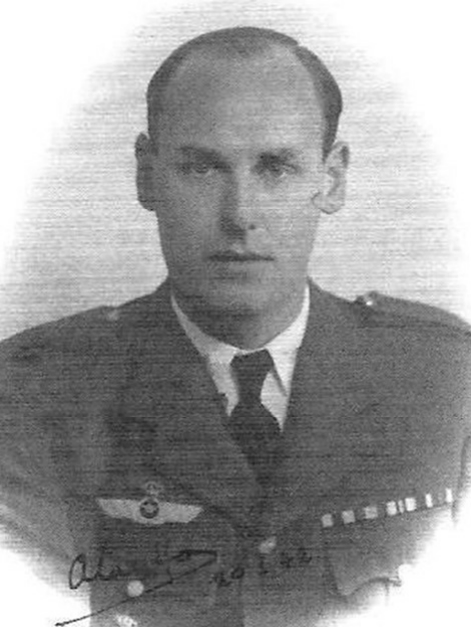
- Prince Ataúlfo in uniform of the Spanish Air Force, 1942
- Born: 20 October 1913; Madrid, Spain
- Died: 8 October 1974 (aged 60); Málaga, Spain
Names
- Ataúlfo Carlos Isabelo Alejandro de Orleans y Sajonia-Coburgo-Gotha
- House: Orléans-Galliera
- Father: Infante Alfonso, Duke of Galliera
- Mother: Princess Beatrice of Saxe-Coburg and Gotha
- Religion: Roman Catholicism

Prince Ataúlfo of Orléans (20 October 1913 – 8 October 1974), was a Spanish prince, the youngest son of Infante Alfonso, Duke of Galliera and Princess Beatrice of Edinburgh. He was President of Real Club de la Puerta de Hierro from 1962 to 1966.

== Life and family ==
He was born in Madrid, as the third and last son of Infante Alfonso, Duke of Galliera (elder son of Infante Antonio, Duke of Galliera, and of Infanta Eulalia of Spain) and Princess Beatrice of Saxe-Coburg and Gotha (youngest daughter of Alfred, Duke of Saxe-Coburg and Gotha, and of Grand Duchess Maria Alexandrovna of Russia). He was named after king Athaulf, who ruled the Visigothic Kingdom from 410 to 415.

Although he was not made an Infante like his eldest brother, Alfonso XIII gave him and his other brother Alonso the same privileges and honours. His godparents were Infante Carlos of the Two-Sicilies, and Isabella de Borbón. Prince Ataúlfo was a student at Sandroyd School in Wiltshire.

He was idolised by Priscilla Scott-Ellis who was not deterred by his mother who hinted that he was not interested. He would later reveal his homosexuality.

When the Spanish Civil War broke out, Prince Ataúlfo volunteered in the Condor Legion, the German volunteer unit that was sent by Hitler to repel Communism in Spain. Only he and two of his cousins, Luis Alfonso and José Eugenio of Bavaria (Prince Fernando of Bavaria's sons) represented the Spanish royal family in Francoist official acts, due to the pro-democratic views held by most of the royal family. He was followed to Spain by Priscilla Scott-Ellis who volunteered as a nurse mainly to be near him. In time she married another Spanish aristocrat.

He died in Málaga on 8 October 1974 as a result of pancreatitis.

== Honours ==
Arms of Ataúlfo de Orleans-Borbón

- (Restoration (Spain)) : Knight Grand Cross of the Order of Charles III (1930)

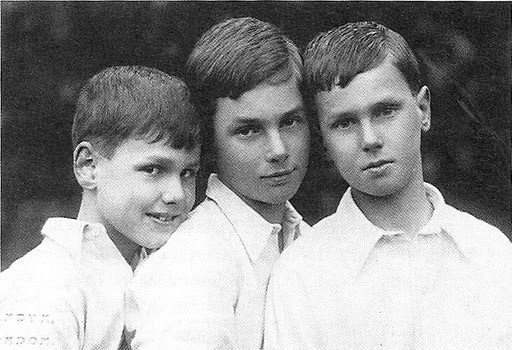
A young Ataúlfo (left) with his two brothers, Prince Alfonso and Infante Álvaro

== Ancestry ==
Ancestors of Prince Ataúlfo of Orléans

8. Prince Antoine, Duke of Montpensier
4. Infante Antonio, Duke of Galliera
9. Infanta Luisa Fernanda of Spain
2. Infante Alfonso, Duke of Galliera
10. Infante Francisco de Asís of Spain
5. Infanta Eulalia of Spain
11. Isabella II of Spain
1. Prince Ataúlfo of Orléans
12. Prince Albert of Saxe-Coburg and Gotha
6. Alfred, Duke of Saxe-Coburg and Gotha
13. Victoria of the United Kingdom
3. Princess Beatrice of Saxe-Coburg and Gotha
14. Alexander II of Russia
7. Grand Duchess Maria Alexandrovna of Russia
15. Princess Marie of Hesse and by Rhine
