= Cabin Point, Virginia =

- Unincorporated community
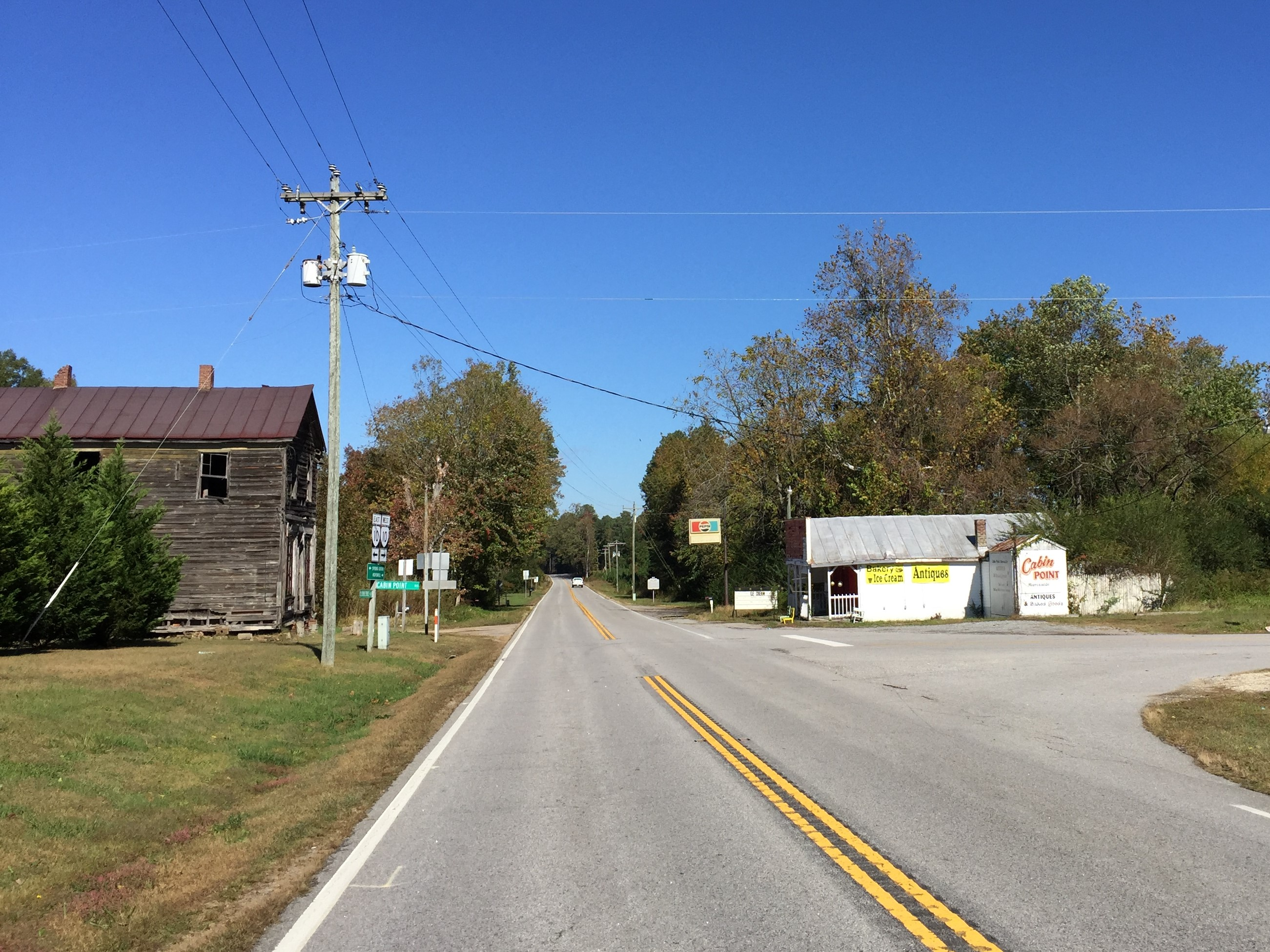
- Intersection of Colonial Trial and Cabin Point Road; Cabin Point Mercantile store on the right

- Location within Virginia Location within the United States
- Coordinates: 37°11′06″N 77°01′54″W
- Country: United States
- State: Virginia
- County: Surry
- Elevation: 69 ft (21 m)
- Time zone: UTC-5 (Eastern (EST))
  - Summer (DST): UTC-4 (EDT)
- Area codes: 757, 948
- GNIS feature ID: 1464229

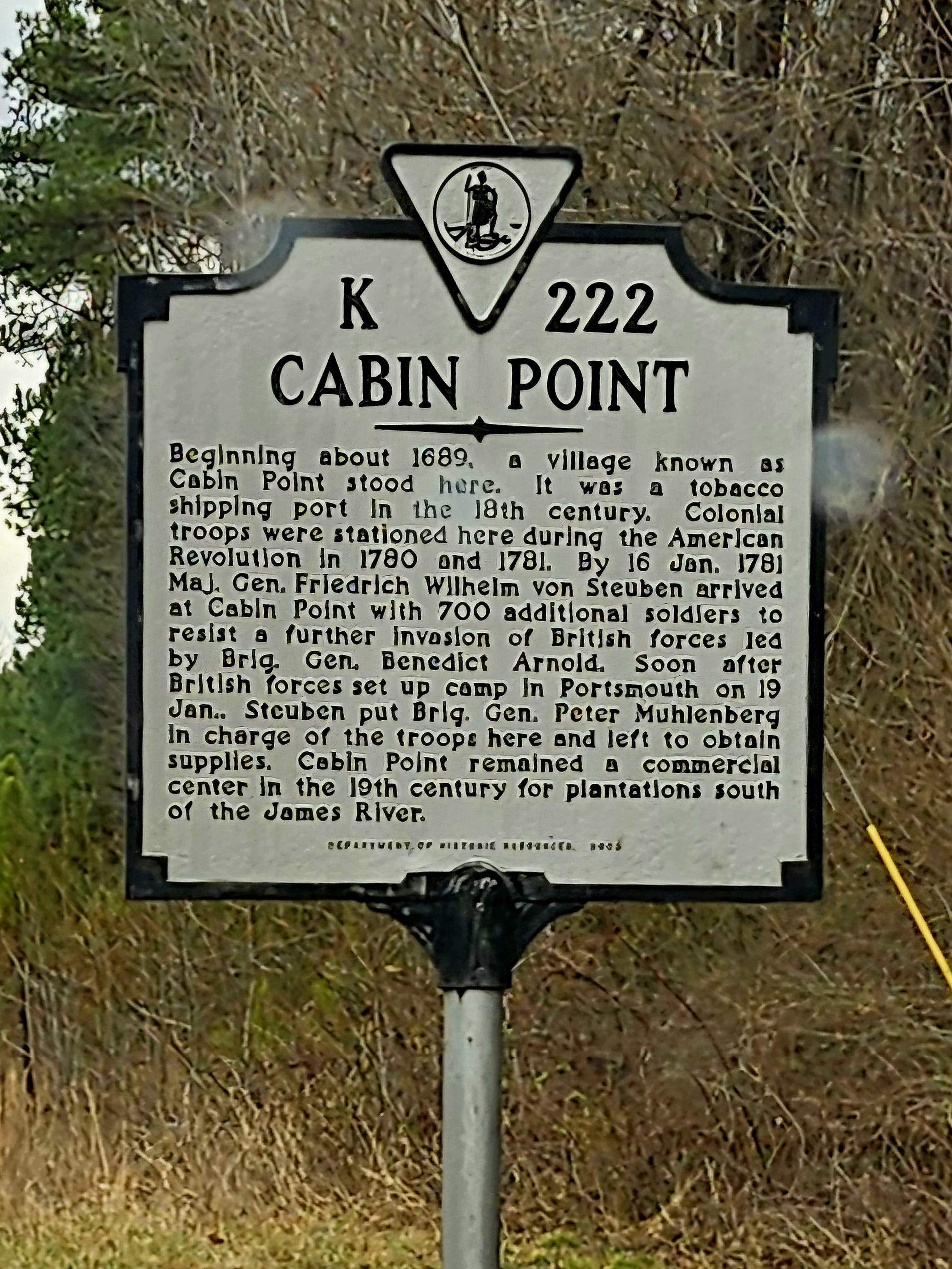
Cabin Point historical marker

Cabin Point is an unincorporated community in Surry County, Virginia, United States. Cabin Point is located on Virginia State Route 10, 4.8 miles (7.7 km) southwest of Claremont. Montpelier, a home which is listed on the National Register of Historic Places, is located near Cabin Point.
