= 110 and 112 Harley Street =

Building in Westminster, London, England

Coordinates: 51.5215°N 0.1479°W

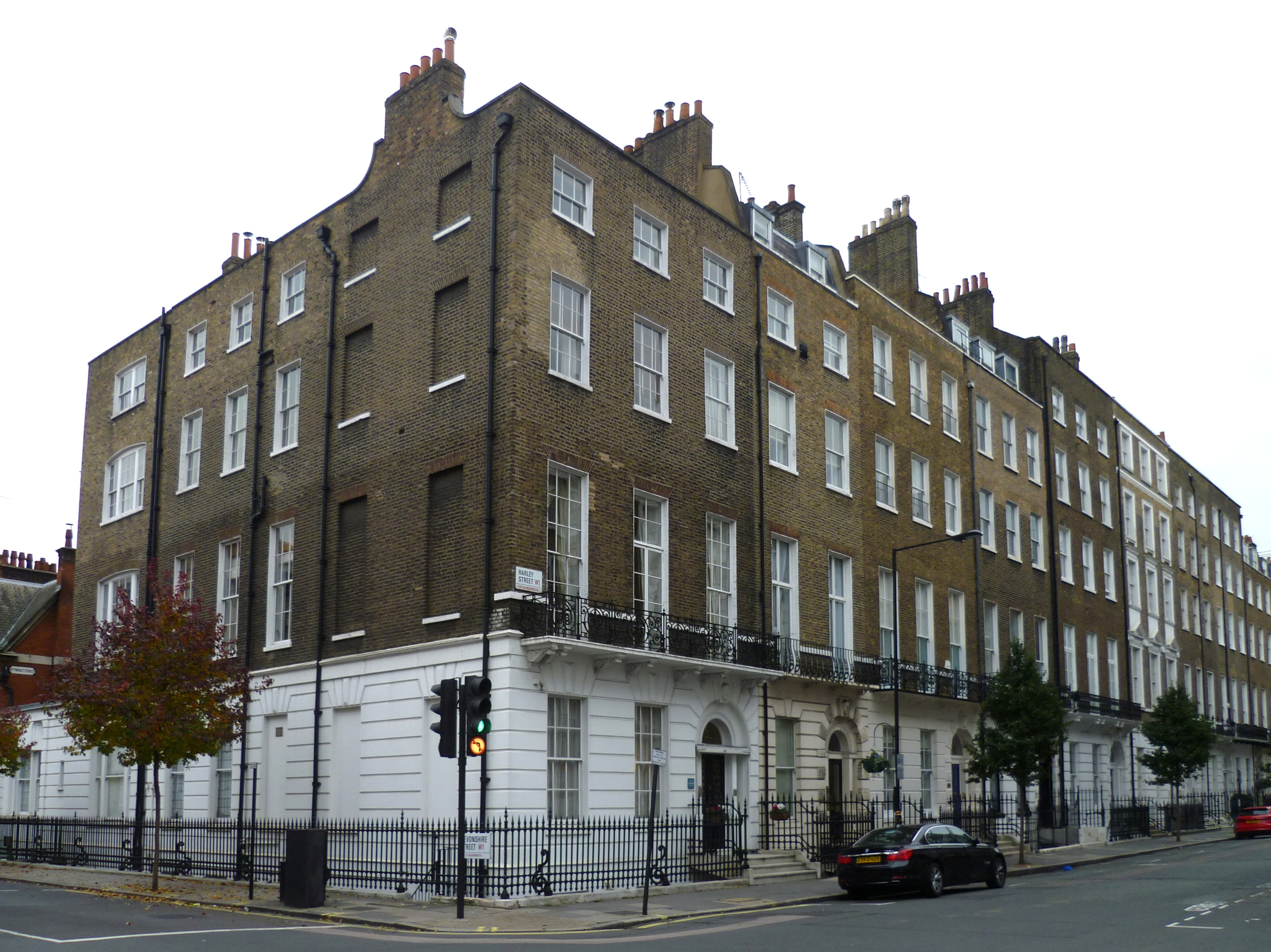
110 and 112 Harley Street (centre), on the corner with Devonshire Street.

110 and 112 Harley Street are grade II listed terraced town houses in Harley Street, in the City of Westminster, London. The houses were of the "first rate" class, built around 1777 as part of the Portland Estate (now the Howard de Walden Estate), probably by John White and the plasterer Thomas Collins who were associated with Sir William Chambers.
