= Seaford House =

Building in Westminster, London, England

Coordinates: 51°29′57″N 0°9′4″W

The main frontage of Seaford House

Seaford House (originally Sefton House) is a historic town house located at 37 Belgrave Square in the Belgravia district of London, England. It currently serves as the home of the Royal College of Defence Studies.

It is the largest of the detached town houses sited on each corner of Belgrave Square. A magnolia stucco building with four main storeys, it is most famed for its interiors (the first floor, or piano nobile, being decorated in Beaux-Arts style, with bronze panelling on the staircase by sculptor Andrea Lucchesi).

== Early history ==
Constructed between 1842 and 1845, the original Sefton House was designed in the classical style by Philip Hardwick and built by Thomas Cubitt to meet the requirements of the 3rd Earl of Sefton. The town house (which also contains 1850s friezes by the Italian artist Domenico Bruschi), stable yard and outbuildings, together with post-war railings and gate piers, is listed Grade II* for architectural merit. The 3rd and 4th Earls of Sefton enjoyed using it as their London residence; the 5th earl, being an invalid, could not do so and after he died childless in 1901, its lease was sold to the entrepreneur (and social reformer) William Tebb.

Lord Howard de Walden, also Baron Seaford, acquired the lease of the building in 1902. He renamed it Seaford House and installed further friezes, panelling, and a staircase of green onyx specially imported from South America.

== Later history ==
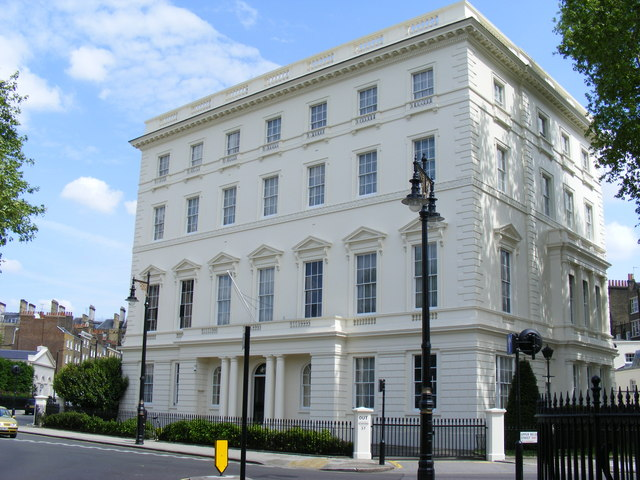
View of the house from Belgrave Square

Requisitioned by the Wartime Government in 1940, and for a while used as offices by the Air Ministry, Seaford House was badly damaged by Luftwaffe aerial bombing in October 1940. Its facade was rebuilt thereafter, but without the porte-cochère. In 1946, it became the home of the Imperial Defence College, now the Royal College of Defence Studies.

Seaford House used to be open to the public free of charge on Open House Weekend each September. Today, it can only be seen on screen. The main vestibule doubled as Titanic's Grand Staircase in the 1979 miniseries SOS Titanic. It was also used in the filming of Upstairs, Downstairs and later in the BBC spy show Spooks. Seaford House stood in as the exterior of the home of Maggie Gyllenhaal's character Nessa Stein in the BBC and SundanceTV television miniseries The Honourable Woman in 2014. It can also be seen (doubling as the US Embassy) in the 2021 film The King's Man.

== See also ==
- Earls of Sefton
- Barons Howard de Walden and Seaford

== Bibliography ==
- Stourton, James (2012). Great Houses of London. London: Frances Lincoln. ISBN 978-0-7112-3366-9.
