= Slip Anchor =

British-bred Thoroughbred racehorse

- Racing silks of Lord Howard de Walden
- Sire: Shirley Heights
- Grandsire: Mill Reef
- Dam: Sayonara
- Damsire: Birkhahn
- Sex: Stallion
- Foaled: 5 April 1982
- Country: Great Britain
- Colour: Bay
- Breeder: Plantation Stud
- Owner: Lord Howard de Walden
- Trainer: Henry Cecil
- Record: 9: 4-3-1
- Earnings: £296,722

Major wins
- Heathorn Stakes (1985); Lingfield Derby Trial (1985); Epsom Derby (1985)

Awards
- Timeform rating 136; Top-rated European Racehorse (1985); Timeform top-rated racehorse (1985)
- Last updated on 2 January 2010

Slip Anchor (1982–2011) was a British Thoroughbred racehorse best known for winning the 1985 Epsom Derby by seven lengths. After showing some promise as a two-year-old, he showed substantial improvement in the spring of 1985, winning the Derby Trial at Lingfield Park Racecourse by ten lengths before recording a rare start-to-finish win in the Derby. He was rated the best racehorse in Europe in 1985. His subsequent career was disrupted by injury, and he finished second in his other three races before being retired to stud. He had some success as a breeding stallion and died in 2011.

Slip Anchor was the fifth Epsom Derby winner whose sire (Shirley Heights) and paternal grandsire (Mill Reef) were themselves winners of Britain's premier classic.

== Background ==
Slip Anchor, was a "tall, rangy" bay horse with an irregular white star on his forehead in the shape of a lightning bolt. He was bred by Lord Howard de Walden in whose apricot colours he competed throughout his racing career. Slip Anchor was sent into training with Henry Cecil at his Warren Place stable in Newmarket and was ridden in all of his major races by the American jockey Steve Cauthen.

Slip Anchor was sired by the 1978 Derby winner, Shirley Heights. His dam was Sayonara, a German-bred mare who produced several other winners including Lancashire Oaks winner Sandy Island.

== Racing career ==
As a two-year-old in 1984, Slip Anchor finished fourth on his debut. In October, he ran in a ten furlong race at Nottingham Racecourse, and, despite showing inexperience ("running green"), he won by four lengths from Rushad. At the end of the year, he was given a rating of 91 by Timeform, whose editor described him as "sure to go on to better things".

Slip Anchor finished third on his first appearance as a three-year-old before winning the Heathorn Stakes at Newmarket Racecourse in May. On his next appearance, he was sent to Lingfield for the Highland Spring Derby Trial. Cecil had not regarded the colt particularly highly and treated the event as an easy opportunity to win a Group race, but Slip Anchor led from the start and won by ten lengths from Lord Grundy to establish himself as a leading contender for the Epsom Deby.

At Epsom on 5 June, Slip Anchor started the 9/4 favourite for the Derby, ahead of 2000 Guineas winner Shadeed and the Irish-trained colts Law Society and Theatrical. The race attracted a crowd of 250,000 spectators including Queen Elizabeth II on a warm, misty day. Cauthen sent Slip Anchor into the lead from the start and maintained a slight advantage until halfway when he accelerated clear of his thirteen opponents. He turned into the straight ten lengths ahead of the field and was never challenged, winning by seven lengths from Law Society, who was in turn six lengths clear of the rest. Theatrical finished seventh, Petoski eleventh, and Shadeed thirteenth. Slip Anchor was the first Derby winner to lead all the way since Coronach in 1926. His victory made Cauthen the first American jockey for 65 years to win the Derby and the first to ride the winners of both the Kentucky Derby (on Affirmed in 1978) and the Epsom original. After the race, Cauthen described Slip Anchor as the best horse he had ever ridden, including Affirmed, saying that "this horse kills them before they have a chance to get at him."

After the Derby, Slip Anchor sustained an injury to his left foreleg in training and missed an intended run in the King George VI and Queen Elizabeth Stakes at Ascot Racecourse in July (won by Petoski). Slip Anchor returned to the track in the September Stakes at Kempton Park. He started the 1/2 favourite but was beaten half a length by the four-year-old Shernazar (Shergar's half-brother). On his final appearance of the season, Slip Anchor was brought back in distance to contest the Champion Stakes over ten furlongs at Newmarket on 19 October. In an exceptionally strong renewal of the race, he finished second to the filly Pebbles, with Palace Music in third and Commanche Run unplaced.

Slip Anchor stayed in training as a four-year-old but became increasingly temperamental and difficult to train: for a time, Cecil had to exercise the colt separately from his other horses. He was beaten by Phardante on his seasonal debut in the Jockey Club Stakes and did not race again. His retirement was announced in June, with Cecil saying that the colt had not "recaptured his brilliance of last year".

== Assessment ==
Slip Anchor was given a rating of 136 by the independent Timeform organisation, making him the highest-rated horse of the year. He was also the top-rated racehorse in the official International classification. In their book A Century of Champions, John Randall and Tony Morris rated Slip Anchor a "superior" Derby winner and the sixty-sixth best racehorse trained in Britain and Ireland in the 20th century.

== Stud career ==
Slip Anchor was retired to the stud duty at his owner's Plantation Stud at Exning near Newmarket,

Slip Anchor most notably produced the 1992 European Horse of the Year, User Friendly, winner of The Oaks and St Leger Stakes. His other good winners included Posidonas, (Gran Premio d'Italia, Princess of Wales's Stakes, Hardwicke Stakes), Morshdi (Italian Derby, Grosser Preis von Baden), Give the Slip (Ebor Handicap, 2nd Melbourne Cup) and Slicious (Premio Roma).

In later years, he began to suffer from arthritis but was exercised every day and described as "a charming character" and "a bit of a poser" by his handlers. Slip Anchor was euthanised at the age of twenty-nine on 22 September 2011 at Plantation Stud at Exning. The stud manager explained that "he just started to go downhill in the last few weeks ... it was due to the infirmities of old age." His body was cremated, and his remains were laid next to champion miler Kris.

== Pedigree ==
Pedigree of Slip Anchor, bay stallion, 1982
Sire Shirley Heights (GB) 1975	Mill Reef(USA); 1968	Never Bend	Nasrullah
Sire Shirley Heights (GB) 1975	Mill Reef(USA); 1968	Never Bend	Lalun
Sire Shirley Heights (GB) 1975	Mill Reef(USA); 1968	Milan Mill	Princequillo
Sire Shirley Heights (GB) 1975	Mill Reef(USA); 1968	Milan Mill	Virginia Water
Sire Shirley Heights (GB) 1975	Hardiemma (GB); 1969	Hardicanute	Hard Ridden
Sire Shirley Heights (GB) 1975	Hardiemma (GB); 1969	Hardicanute	Harvest Maid
Sire Shirley Heights (GB) 1975	Hardiemma (GB); 1969	Grand Cross	Grandmaster
Sire Shirley Heights (GB) 1975	Hardiemma (GB); 1969	Grand Cross	Blue Cross
Dam Sayonara (GER) 1965	Birkhahn (GER); 1945	Alchimist	Herold
Dam Sayonara (GER) 1965	Birkhahn (GER); 1945	Alchimist	Aversion
Dam Sayonara (GER) 1965	Birkhahn (GER); 1945	Bramouse	Cappiello
Dam Sayonara (GER) 1965	Birkhahn (GER); 1945	Bramouse	Peregrine
Dam Sayonara (GER) 1965	Suleika (GER); 1954	Ticino	Athanasius
Dam Sayonara (GER) 1965	Suleika (GER); 1954	Ticino	Terra
Dam Sayonara (GER) 1965	Suleika (GER); 1954	Schwarzblaurot	Magnat
Dam Sayonara (GER) 1965	Suleika (GER); 1954	Schwarzblaurot	Schwarzgold (Family 16-c)
