= José Luis de Vilallonga, 9th Marquess of Castellbell =

Spanish author, socialite and actor (1920–2007)

The Most Excellent The Marquess of Castellbell GE LH
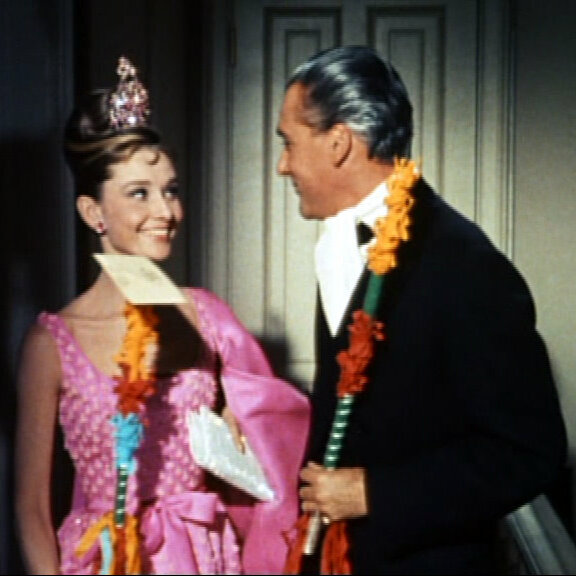
- Vilallonga with Audrey Hepburn (left) in Breakfast at Tiffany's (1961)
- Born: José Luis de Vilallonga y Cabeza de Vaca; 29 January 1920; Madrid, Spain
- Died: 30 August 2007 (aged 87); Andratx, Mallorca, Spain
- Resting place: Poblenou Cemetery
- Occupations: Author, actor, diplomat
- Years active: 1958–1997
- Title: 9th Marquess of Castellbell
- Spouses: The Hon. Esyllt-Priscilla Scott-Ellis (m. 1945; div. 1972) Syliane Stella Morell (m. 1974; div. 1995) María Begoña Aranguren Gárate (m. 1999; sep. 2002)
- Partner: Michèle Girardon (1958–1972)
- Children: 3
- Relatives: Vicente Cabeza de Vaca y Fernández de Córdoba (grandfather); Alfonso de Portago (cousin); Vicente Sartorius (cousin)

José Luis de Vilallonga y Cabeza de Vaca, 9th Marquess of Castellbell, GE (29 January 1920 – 30 August 2007) was a Spanish nobleman, author, socialite and film actor. His peculiar character, described as "a mixture of aristocratic arrogance, self-confidence and unconcern", brought him frequent enmities with other public figures. He was known to be a multifaceted, charming, elegant and playboy-like figure. At his death in 2007, Vilallonga was referred to by several newspapers as "the last dandy".

== Family ==
Villalonga was born to an important Catalan noble family, son of Salvador de Vilallonga y Cárcer, 8th Marquess of Castellbell amongst other titles, and María del Carmen Cabeza de Vaca y Carvajal, daughter of the 9th Marquess of Portago. On his paternal side, he was descended from viceroy Amat, whereas on his maternal side, some of Vilallonga's ancestors were Alvar Núñez Cabeza de Vaca, Pedro Téllez-Girón, Ferrante Gonzaga II and Christopher Columbus. Both Alfonso de Portago and Vicente Sartorius were his first cousins, being all from the maternal side of the Cabeza de Vaca family.

== Biography ==
=== Early life and Spanish Civil War ===
Born in Madrid, Vilallonga – who also went by the surname of Cabeza de Vaca – was a Grandee of Spain and part of the nobility, holding the title of Marquess of Castellbell.

He spent the first two years of his life at a clinic in Munich, to recover from an intestinal condition with which he was born. His grandmother had a powerful influence on his education, which was very broad and advanced for the time. He studied at the Jesuits of Barcelona and in other schools from which he was often expelled for misbehavior.

Upon the declaration in 1931 of Spain's Second Republic his family went into exile in Biarritz, France, but returned six months later. When the Spanish Civil War erupted in 1936, Vilallonga was studying at École Saint-Elme, a Dominican school in Arcachon, but his father ordered him back to Spain to fight on the side of the Nationalists. His father was an enthusiastic supporter of the rebel side, and at age 16 the younger Vilallonga was a serving member of a Nationalist execution platoon, as a provisional second lieutenant of Requetés.

=== Diplomat and author ===
After pursuing a four-year long career in diplomacy, he married his first wife Esyylt Priscilla "Pip" Scott-Ellis, a daughter of Thomas Scott-Ellis, 8th Baron Howard de Walden, while he was working as an attaché in London. They met in January 1944 and they married at Sanlúcar on 20 September 1945. Her family did not approve and none of them could attend the wedding. His father-in-law was so unimpressed by him that he had his will changed in the faint hope of protecting his daughter's inheritance. He then became interested in journalism and literature, his first works being at Diario de Barcelona. After World War II, de Vilallonga became increasingly disenchanted with Francoist Spain, and he left the Spanish diplomatic service to live abroad.

In 1954 his first novel, The Ramblas End in the Sea, was published, causing the Spanish military government censor to issue a ban on his reentry to the country. He then obtained work as a foreign correspondent for the national press agency EFE and for the magazines Paris Match, Marie Claire and Vogue. His social connections and ability to relate gossip among Europe's jet set enabled him to regularly sell magazine articles, in addition to authoring four autobiographical tell-all books about his numerous love affairs. After recording taped interviews with Spain's King Juan Carlos, he wrote the monarch's first ever and only authorised biography, titled El Rey and published in 1993.

He had a brief step through politics, that included toying with the Spanish Socialist Workers' Party.

=== Actor ===
Vilallonga's acting career came through as a result of his good connections with many prominent figures of the artistic world. He made his film debut in the 1958 Louis Malle film The Lovers. Throughout the late 1950s and 1960s, Vilallonga appeared in numerous films in both Europe and Hollywood, working with prominent directors like Federico Fellini, Agnès Varda, Fred Zinnemann and John Schlesinger.

Though he refused a Hollywood acting contract, a highlight in his acting career was a role as "José da Silva Pereira," the dashing Brazilian multimillionaire whom Holly Golightly (played by Audrey Hepburn) planned to marry in Blake Edwards' classic movie, Breakfast at Tiffany's (1961). He also appeared as the debonair Prince Cesare della Romita, who becomes Julie Christie's second husband in Darling (1965).

== Personal life ==
Vilallonga was married three times:

- The Honourable Esyllt-Priscilla ("Pip") Scott-Ellis (b. 1916 d. 1983) (married 1945, divorced 1972)
- Syliane Stella Morell (married 1974, divorced 1995)
- Begoña Aranguren (married 1999, separated 2002)

A spendthrift, he soon disposed of much of his first wife's inheritance and property. He had frequent affairs, including a relationship with the French actress Michèle Girardon and Hungarian actress Magda Gabor, both while still married to Esyllt-Priscilla Scott-Ellis. They lived in France and Argentina and they had two children before they divorced in 1972. Girardon eventually committed suicide in 1975 after de Vilallonga ended their relationship to marry Syliane Stella Morell. Though courts twice found him liable for alimony to his first wife Esyllt-Priscilla Scott-Ellis, de Vilallonga never paid the judgment, an act which reduced her to poverty for the remainder of her life. His third wife Begoña Aranguren also became disenchanted with de Vilallonga, and the couple separated in 2002. Aranguren wrote a scathing portrayal of the aging socialite and their marriage in 2004.

== Death ==
De Vilallonga died at his home on the island of Mallorca on 30 August 2007 from natural causes. He is survived by children John and Carmen from his first marriage and an adopted son Fabricio. King Juan Carlos expressed his sadness at Vilallonga's death.

== Filmography ==
Year	Title	Role	Notes
1958	The Lovers	Raoul Florès	
1960	L'Ennemi dans l'ombre	Georges Dandieu	
1961	Vive Henri IV, vive l'amour	L'envoyé d'Espagne	
1961	Naked Autumn	Prévieux	
1961	The Nina B. Affair	Kurt	
1961	Breakfast at Tiffany's	José da Silva Pereira	
1962	Tales of Paris	Louis	(segment "Sophie")
1962	Cléo from 5 to 7	The Lover	
1962	Le Rendez-vous de minuit	Bob	
1962	The Law of Men	Le prêtre	
1963	Any Number Can Win	M. Grimp	
1963	Don't Tempt the Devil	Paul Dupré	
1964	Behold a Pale Horse	Horse Dealer	
1964	The Magnificent Cuckold	The Club President	
1965	The Three Faces	Rodolph	(segment "Gli amanti celebri")
1965	The Sucker		Uncredited
1965	Darling	Prince Cesare della Romita	
1965	Juliet of the Spirits	Giorgio's friend	
1966	A Maiden for a Prince	Alessandro de Medici	
1966	Tecnica di un omicidio	Dr. Goldstein / Frank Secchy	
1967	L'homme qui trahit la mafia	Mario Vérona	
1970	The Naughty Cheerleader	Mr. Epstein	
1971	Sapho ou la Fureur d'aimer	Maurice Duran-Vior	
1971	The Burglars	Tasco	
1972	Le Viager	Le général qui décore Martinet	Uncredited
1973	The Angels	Bernard	
1975	Trop c'est trop	Le photographe	
1976	The Good and the Bad		
1976	Chi dice donna dice donna	Louis	(segment "Donne d'affari")
1980	Speed Cross	Meyer	
1980	Eugenio	Tristano	
1980	Une femme au bout de la nuit	Xavier, le mari	
1981	National Heritage	Álvaro	
1981	Patrizia	Lord James Cook	
1981	Dos y dos, cinco	Juanjo's Father	
1982	Nacional III	Álvaro	
1983	Femmes		Uncredited
1983	Scarab	Presidente frances	
1984	Poppers	Max	
1985	Tex and the Lord of the Deep	Dr. Warton	
1988	La Diputada	Federico	
1989	Blood and Sand	Don José	
1992	The Long Winter	Conde de Santbenet	

== Bibliography ==
- The Man of Blood (1961), ISBN 2-02-000961-7
- Allegro Barbaro (1969), ISBN 2-02-001077-1
- The King (1994), ISBN 978-0297813583
- Fiesta (1995), ISBN 2-221-08213-3
- Solo, Editions (2000), ISBN 2-226-00331-2
