= Seaford Town, Jamaica =

Settlement located in the parish of Westmoreland in Jamaica

Coordinates: 18.250963°N 77.906747°W

Location of Seaford Town in Jamaica

Seaford Town is a settlement located in the parish of Westmoreland in Jamaica. It is located on the westernmost side of the island. It is commonly known as "German Town", due to the settlement of the area by German labourers in approximately 1835.

== History ==
It was founded by Charles Ellis, 1st Baron Seaford.

In 2025, Hurricane Melissa destroyed all public buildings in Seaford Town.
