= Montpelier (Cabin Point, Virginia) =

Historic house in Virginia, United States

- U.S. National Register of Historic Places
- Virginia Landmarks Register
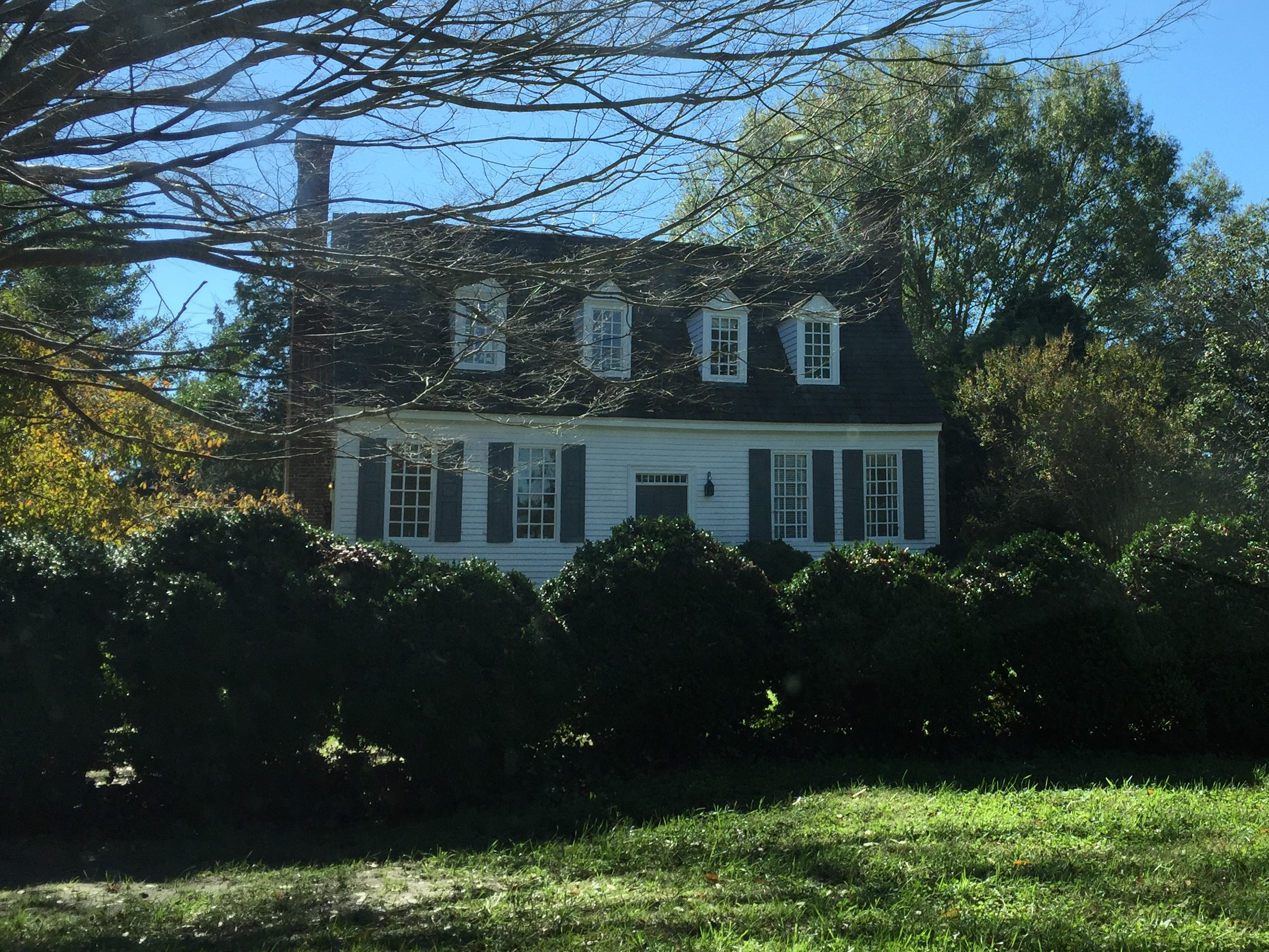

- Location within Virginia Location within the United States
- Location: 1.4 mi. SW of Cabin Point, near Cabin Point, Virginia
- Coordinates: 37°10′19″N 77°3′9″W
- Area: 7 acres (2.8 ha)
- Architectural style: Tidewater vernacular
- NRHP reference No.: 80004227
- VLR No.: 090-0014

Significant dates
- Added to NRHP: March 26, 1980
- Designated VLR: February 21, 1978

Montpelier is a historic home in Surry County, Virginia, located near Cabin Point. While the home's builder and date of construction are uncertain, it was built by a member of the Cocke family, most likely one of two men named John Cocke. Its layout and architecture suggest that it was built in the latter half of the eighteenth century, although its date of construction has also been cited as circa 1724. The house is considered to be an "unusually distinctive example" of vernacular architecture in the Tidewater region; additionally, its features and layout provide important evidence as to how local architecture developed in the region. The house was added to the National Register of Historic Places on March 26, 1980.
