= Charles Ellis, 6th Baron Howard de Walden =

British diplomat and politician (1799–1868)

The Right Honourable The Lord Howard de Walden

Under-Secretary of State for Foreign Affairs
- In office 26 May 1824 – 9 June 1828
- Monarch: George IV
- Prime Minister: The Earl of Liverpool; George Canning; The Viscount Goderich
- Preceded by: Lord Francis Conyngham
- Succeeded by: Lord Dunglass

Personal details
- Born: 5 June 1799
- Died: 29 August 1868 (aged 69)
- Spouse: Lady Lucy Cavendish-Scott-Bentinck (c. 1813–1899)
- Education: Eton College

Charles Augustus Ellis, 6th Baron Howard de Walden and 2nd Baron Seaford GCB (5 June 1799 – 29 August 1868), was a British diplomat and politician.

== Lineage ==
Ellis was the son of Charles Ellis, 1st Baron Seaford and his wife, the Honourable Elizabeth Hervey, daughter of John Hervey, Lord Hervey, eldest son of Frederick Hervey, 4th Earl of Bristol, the "Earl-Bishop" of Derry. Educated at Eton College, He succeeded his great-grandfather Lord Bristol in the barony of Howard de Walden on 8 July 1803, aged four.

Ellis became the 6th Lord Howard de Walden in 1807, a title that descended to him through his mother's line, and when his father died in 1845, he became the 2nd Lord Seaford.

Although his family's wealth initially derived from sugar plantations in Jamaica, it was his marriage to the Duke of Portland's daughter that ultimately saved the family from bankruptcy.

== Jamaican planter ==
Ellis inherited all his father's property in Jamaica, including sugar estates in Montpelier, Jamaica, Caymanas Park, Shettlewood and Crawle. Although the Ellis family wealth was built on these, after 1832 they were in decline. Charles Augustus was raised in England and does not seem to have visited Jamaica before 1846 when he took his wife, Lucy and son Frederick. Sugar production had fallen dramatically and in 1855 was abandoned and replaced with cattle rearing.

The slaves on his properties were emancipated in 1832, and their wages were very low. In an attempt to improve profits on his plantations, Ellis further reduced wages paid to the newly emancipated slaves, which met with resistance and resulted in a strike. He actively encouraged workers from Europe, notably Portugal and Germany, but the plantations remained unprofitable.

== Political and diplomatic career ==
Lord Howard de Walden became an ensign and lieutenant in the Grenadier Guards on 24 April 1817. He served as Joint Under-Secretary of State for Foreign Affairs from 26 May 1824 to 9 June 1828, during which time he acted as Attaché to Lord Stuart de Rothesay on a mission to Rio de Janeiro in Brazil (January 1826). This role allowed him to move into international diplomacy, as he served as Envoy Extraordinary and Minister Plenipotentiary to the court of Stockholm, Sweden, from 2 October 1832, to the court of Lisbon, Portugal, from 22 November 1833, and at Brussels, Belgium, from 10 December 1846. Lord Howard de Walden was appointed a Knight Grand Cross of the Order of the Bath on 22 July 1838 and a Grand Cross of the Portuguese Order of the Tower and Sword in 1841. He succeeded in the barony of Seaford on the death of his father in July 1845.

== Family ==
Lord Howard de Walden married Lady Lucy Cavendish-Scott-Bentinck (c. 1813 – 29 July 1899), daughter of William Cavendish-Scott-Bentinck, 4th Duke of Portland, at All Souls' Church in Marylebone on 8 November 1828. She and her elder sister jointly inherited in 1879 the Duke of Portland's London Estate in Marylebone which had become extremely valuable. Her sister died childless and so the estate became part of the Howard de Walden inheritance. They had six sons and seven daughters, including:

- Frederick George Ellis, 7th Baron Howard de Walden (9 August 1830 – November 1899).
- Harriette Georgina Ellis (3 September 1831 – 16 April 1906). She married in 1875 Michelangelo Caetani, 13th Duke of Sermoneta.
- Hon. William Charles Ellis (22 July 1835 – 20 June 1923).
- Hon. Charles Arthur Ellis (December 1839 – 30 March 1906).
- Hon. John Charles Ellis (29 September 1841 – 8 November 1886).
- Hon. Evelyn Henry Ellis (9 August 1843 – 5 September 1913). Ellis was an early patron of Daimler launches and cars and first distance motorist in England: Southampton to Malvern, July 1895 on a 3½hp Daimler-engined French Panhard & Levassor car. His cousin, Sir Arthur Ellis's post as an equerry to the Prince of Wales directly led to the adoption of Daimler cars as official royal transport. He was the last member of the Ellis family to run the family's sugar estates in Montpelier, Jamaica.
- Augustus Charles William Ellis (5 February 1846 – 22 April 1882).

Lord Howard de Walden died in August 1868 in Belgium, aged 69, and was succeeded by his eldest son, Frederick George Ellis, 7th Baron Howard de Walden. Lady Lucy Joan Howard de Walden died in July 1899 in St. James House, West Malvern, Worcestershire .

== See also ==
- Belenzada

Political offices
Preceded by Lord Francis Conyngham	Under-Secretary of State for Foreign Affairs with Lord Francis Conyngham 1824–1826 and The Marquess of Clanricarde 1826–1827; 1824–1828	Succeeded by Lord Dunglass
Diplomatic posts
Preceded by The Lord Bloomfield	Envoy Extraordinary and Minister Plenipotentiary to Sweden; 1832–1833	Succeeded by Sir Edward Cromwell Disbrowe
Preceded by Hon. Sir Frederick Lamb	Envoy Extraordinary and Minister Plenipotentiary to Portugal; 1833–1846	Succeeded by George Hamilton Seymour
Preceded by Thomas Wathen Waller (Chargé d'Affaires)	Envoy Extraordinary and Minister Plenipotentiary to Belgium; 1846–1868	Succeeded by John Savile, 1st Baron Savile
Peerage of England
Preceded by Frederick Augustus Hervey	Baron Howard de Walden; 1803–1868	Succeeded by Frederick George Ellis
Peerage of the United Kingdom
Preceded by Charles Rose Ellis	Baron Seaford; 1845–1868	Succeeded by Frederick George Ellis
