= Baron Howard de Walden =

Title in the Peerage of England

Arms of Czernin, the present Baron Howard de Walden

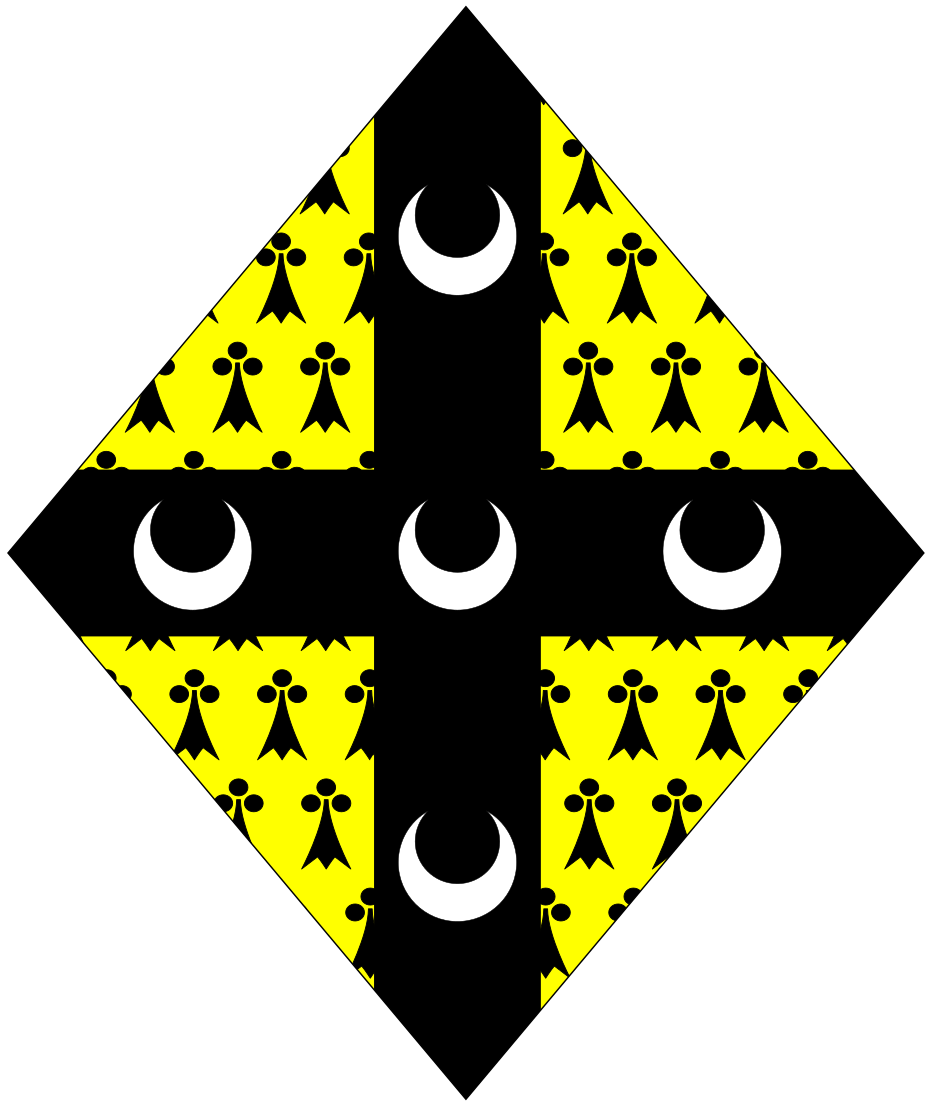
Arms of Ellis: Erminois, a cross sable charged with five crescents argent borne in a lozenge shaped shield by the late Baroness Howard de Walden

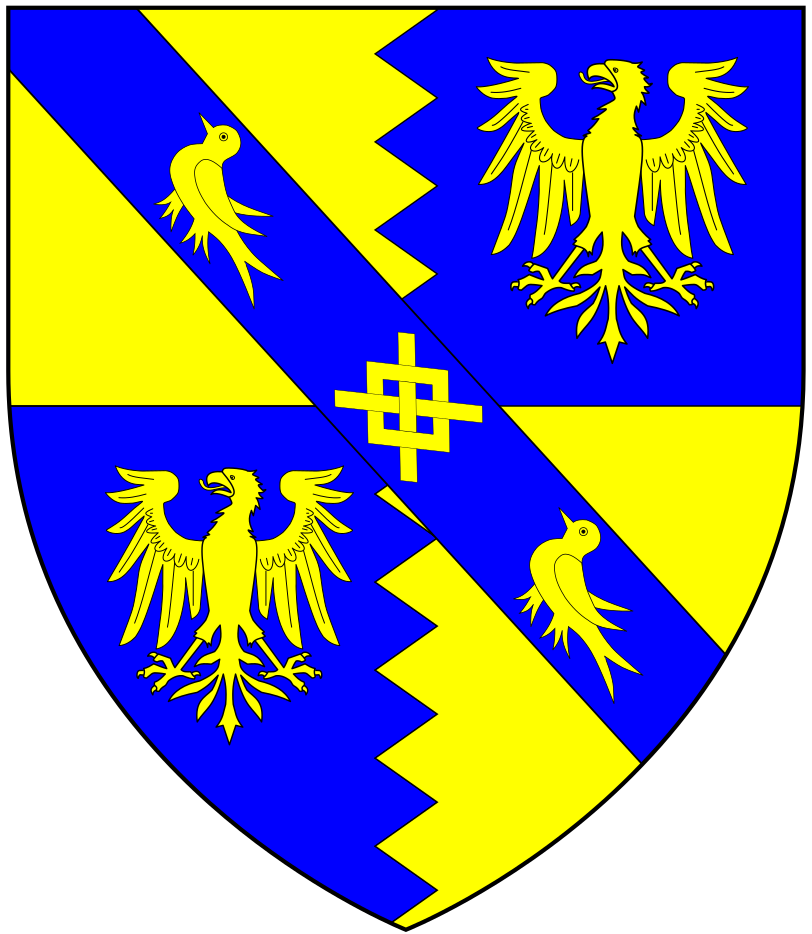
Arms of Thomas Audley, 1st Baron Audley of Walden: Quarterly per pale indented or and azure, in the 2nd and 3rd an eagle displayed of the 1st on a bend of the 2nd a fret between two martlets of the 1st. (Note: For heraldry at Audley End House see; Heraldry of the Family Pew in the Chapel at Audley End.) Quartered by the Howards, Barons Howard de Walden. The fret is a reference to the arms of Audley, which family died out in the male line in 1391.

Arms of Thomas Evelyn Scott-Ellis, 8th Baron Howard de Walden (1880–1946): Quarterly of four: 1: Ellis, 2: Hervey, Marquesses of Bristol, 3: Gules, two lions passant in pale ermine ducally crowned or (Felton), 4: Howard.

Baron Howard de Walden is a title in the Peerage of England. It was created by writ of summons in 1597 by Queen Elizabeth I for Admiral Lord Thomas Howard, a younger son of Thomas Howard, 4th Duke of Norfolk, by his second wife, the Honourable Margaret Audley, daughter of Thomas Audley, 1st Baron Audley of Walden.

== History ==
The title was reputedly granted for the admiral's role in the defeat of the Spanish Armada in 1588. He subsequently went on to obtain the title of Earl of Suffolk from Elizabeth I's successor, King James I, which latter title continues in his male-line descendants. However, the barony of Howard de Walden eventually passed out of the Howard family with the death in 1688 of James Howard, 3rd Earl of Suffolk, and it came briefly to the 4th Earl of Bristol before passing in 1803 to his great-grandson, the four-year-old Charles Ellis.

The title fell into abeyance between 1688 and 1784, between the heirs of the 3rd Earl's two daughters — Lady Essex Howard (a daughter by his first marriage) and Lady Elizabeth Howard (a daughter by his second marriage). Lady Essex Howard married Edward Griffin, 1st Baron Griffin, and had descendants. Her granddaughter, the Hon. Ann Griffin, was the daughter of the 2nd Baron Griffin, and her son John Griffin Whitwell, later Field Marshal John Griffin Griffin (he changed his surname in 1749), inherited one-half or a moiety of the barony when his maternal uncle the 3rd Baron Griffin died without legitimate issue. In 1784, the barony was called out of abeyance in his favour. In 1788, the new 4th Baron Howard de Walden was also created 1st Baron Braybrooke with special remainder to a kinsman, Richard Aldworth Neville.

At the death of Lord Howard de Walden and Braybrooke in 1797 without any issue, the barony of Howard de Walden passed to the only other heir—the representative of the 3rd Earl of Suffolk's younger daughter, Lady Elizabeth Felton. Her daughter Elizabeth Felton had married as his 2nd wife John Hervey, 1st Earl of Bristol, and their grandson was Frederick Hervey, 4th Earl of Bristol (1730–1803). He had inherited the earldom only upon the death of two older brothers. At his death, his second but eldest surviving son inherited the earldom as 5th Earl and eventually became the 1st Marquess of Bristol. However, the barony of Howard de Walden passed out of the Hervey family, to a great-grandson, Charles Ellis, 6th Baron Howard de Walden, who inherited in 1803 and also became 2nd Baron Seaford. The Ellis family owed their wealth to sugar plantations at Montpelier in the Colony of Jamaica, although Charles lived in England and does not seem to have visited there until in his mid-forties. The family's English properties comprised a house in Audley Square, London, and an estate at Seaford in Sussex.

The young Lord Howard de Walden (1799–1868), aged four when he inherited the title from his great-grandfather, eventually married Lady Lucy Cavendish-Scott-Bentinck, youngest daughter of William Bentinck, 4th Duke of Portland, and sister and co-heiress of the reclusive John Bentinck, 5th Duke of Portland. With her childless sister, Viscountess Ossington, she inherited the Duke of Portland's London estate in Marylebone in 1879. Building leases granted from the mid-18th century began to make huge financial returns from the 1870s and quickly made the Howard de Walden family one of the wealthiest in the country. Charles died in 1868 and his heir had to wait until the death of his mother in 1899 before receiving his London inheritance. Meanwhile the indebted Jamaican estates were conveyed to his younger brother Evelyn in 1891.

The 7th Baron, Frederick George (1830–1899), was a soldier with the 4th Light Dragoons. Aged 46 he married Blanche Holden, a beauty 25 years younger than he, whom he subsequently divorced, to the scandal of the day. Their only child, son Thomas Evelyn Ellis, became the 8th Baron Howard de Walden on his father's death in 1899. He adopted the name of Scott-Ellis instead of Ellis and was a keen sportsman and playwright with a particular interest in promoting the Welsh performing arts. The London estate which came through his grandmother made him one of the wealthiest men in England and his main residences were Seaford House in Belgrave Square, London, and Chirk Castle in Wales; he was also involved in the Second Boer War as part with the British military. He was succeeded by his son John Scott-Ellis, 9th Baron Howard de Walden and 5th Baron Seaford (1912–1999).

In 1999, while a cousin succeeded as Baron Seaford, the barony of Howard de Walden fell into abeyance among the 9th Baron's four daughters and co-heiresses, who also jointly inherited substantial estates in London. By royal warrant dated 25 June 2004, the Queen called the barony of Howard de Walden out of abeyance in favour of the eldest daughter, Hazel Czernin (1935–2024). In 1957, she had married Joseph Czernin, son of Count Franz Josef Czernin. He is descended from one of the oldest and most prominent families of the Kingdom of Bohemia (in modern-day Czech Republic). The Czernin family's noble titles of freiherr and imperial count were granted by the Holy Roman Emperors in 1607 and 1623, respectively. By her husband, she had five daughters and a son, Peter Czernin (born 1966), who inherited the title on her death in 2024.

The principal estate owned by previous barons—Audley End House at Saffron Walden in Essex—which had been obtained by Thomas Howard, 1st Earl of Suffolk, from his maternal grandfather Thomas Audley, 1st Baron Audley, was separated from the title when it was left by the 4th Baron Howard de Walden and 1st Baron Braybrooke to his relative Richard Aldworth Neville, 2nd Baron Braybrooke.

Due to their substantial Central London landholdings, known as the Howard de Walden Estate, the Howard de Walden family is one of the wealthiest in Britain, with a net worth of about £4 billion in 2016, in which year Baroness Howard de Walden was ranked the fifth-richest woman in Britain by the Sunday Times Rich List.

== Baron Howard de Walden (1597) ==
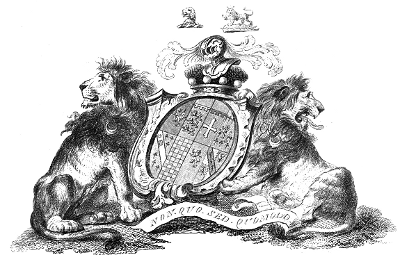
Arms of John Griffin, 4th Baron Howard de Walden, Catton's English Peerage, 1790. Quarterly of eight, 1: Griffin; 2: Thomas of Brotherton (royal arms); 3: Latimer; 4: De la Warr; 5: Howard; 6:Warenne; 7: Mowbray; 8: Audley of Walden

- Thomas Howard, 1st Earl of Suffolk, 1st Baron Howard de Walden (1561–1626)
- Theophilus Howard, 2nd Earl of Suffolk, 2nd Baron Howard de Walden (1584–1640)
- James Howard, 3rd Earl of Suffolk, 3rd Baron Howard de Walden (1619/20 – 1688) (title abeyant 1688)
- John Griffin Griffin, 4th Baron Howard de Walden (1719–1797) (great-grandson) (abeyance terminated 1784; abeyant 1797)
- Frederick Augustus Hervey, 4th Earl of Bristol, 5th Baron Howard de Walden (1730–1803) (became sole heir in 1799)
- Charles Augustus Ellis, 6th Baron Howard de Walden (great-grandson) (1799–1868)
- Frederick George Ellis, 7th Baron Howard de Walden (son) (1830–1899)
- Thomas Evelyn Scott-Ellis, 8th Baron Howard de Walden (son) (1880–1946)
- John Osmael Scott-Ellis, 9th Baron Howard de Walden (son) (1912–1999) (title abeyant from 1999)
- (Mary) Hazel Caridwen Czernin, 10th Baroness Howard de Walden (daughter) (1935–2024) (abeyance terminated 2004) (Note: The Lord Chancellor reported that Her Majesty had been pleased to determine the abeyance in the Barony of Howard De Walden, created by Writ in the year 1597, in favour of Mary Hazel Caridwen Czernin.)
- Peter John Joseph Czernin, 11th Baron Howard de Walden (born 1966)

The heir apparent is the present holder's son, the Hon. Alexander John Peter Czernin (born 1999).

== Title succession chart ==
Title succession chart, Barons Howard de Walden

Baron Howard de Walden (1597); Earl of Suffolk (1603)
Thomas Howard; 1st Earl of Suffolk; 1st Baron Howard de Walden; 1561–1626
Theophilus Howard; 2nd Earl of Suffolk; 2nd Baron Howard de Walden; 1584–1640
James Howard; 3rd Earl of Suffolk; 3rd Baron Howard de Walden; 1619/20 – 1688
Earldom inherited by George Howard, barony in abeyance
Lady Essex Griffin (née Howard) died 1704/1705	Lady Elizabeth Felton (née Howard); 1656–1681
James Griffin; 2nd Baron Griffin of Braybrooke; 1667–1715	Elizabeth Hervey; Countess of Bristol (née Felton); 1676–1741
Hon. Anne Griffin died 1770	John Hervey; 2nd Baron Hervey; 1696–1743
Abeyance terminated 1784; Baron Braybrooke	Abeyance terminated 1799
John Griffin; 4th Baron Howard de Walden; 1st Baron Braybrooke; 1719–1797	George Hervey; 2nd Earl of Bristol; 1721–1775	Augustus Hervey; 3rd Earl of Bristol; 1724–1779	Frederick Hervey; 4th Earl of Bristol; 5th Baron Howard de Walden; 1730–1803
Howard de Walden barony in abeyance	Earldom inherited by Frederick Hervey
Braybrooke barony inherited by Richard Griffin
John Hervey; Lord Hervey; 1757–1796
Elizabeth Ellis; Baroness Seaford (née Hervey); 1780–1803
Charles Ellis; 6th Baron Howard de Walden; 2nd Baron Seaford; 1799–1868
Frederick Ellis; 7th Baron Howard de Walden; 3rd Baron Seaford; 1830–1899
Thomas Scott-Ellis; 8th Baron Howard de Walden; 4th Baron Seaford; 1880–1946
John Scott-Ellis; 9th Baron Howard de Walden; 5th Baron Seaford; 1912–1999
Howard de Walden barony in abeyance
Seaford barony inherited by Colin Ellis
Abeyance terminated 2004
Hazel Czernin; 10th Baroness Howard de Walden (née Scott-Ellis); 1935–2024
Peter Czernin; 11th Baron Howard de Walden born 1966
Hon. Alexander Czernin born 1999
