= Montpelier Historic District =

Montpelier Historic District may refer to:

- Montpelier Historic District (Montpelier, Idaho), listed on the NRHP in Idaho
- Montpelier Historic District (Montpelier, Mississippi), listed on the NRHP in Mississippi
- Montpelier Historic District (Vermont), listed on the NRHP in Vermont
- Montpelier Historic District (Montpelier, Virginia), listed on the NRHP in Virginia
