= Marquess of Castellbell =

Marquessate of Castellbell
- Creation date: 7 July 1702
- Created by: Philip V
- Peerage: Peerage of Spain
- First holder: José de Amat y Planella, 1st Marquess of Castellbell
- Present holder: John Alfonso de Vilallonga y Scott-Ellis, 10th Marquess of Castellbell

Marquess of Castellbell (Spanish: Marqués de Castellbell) is a hereditary title in the Peerage of Spain accompanied by the dignity of Grandee, granted in 1702 by Philip V to José de Amat, a Catalan nobleman who was Lord of Castellbell.

The fourth child of the 1st Marquess, Manuel de Amat y Junyent, would become one of the most important men of his time, a prominent viceroy of Peru (1761–1776).

The 9th Marquess was a prominent actor and media figure in the latter half of twentieth century Spain. In 1945, he married Esyllt Priscilla Scott-Ellis, a daughter of Thomas Scott-Ellis, 8th Baron Howard de Walden. She was a descendant of the 3rd Duke of Portland, who was Prime Minister of the United Kingdom between 1807 and 1809.

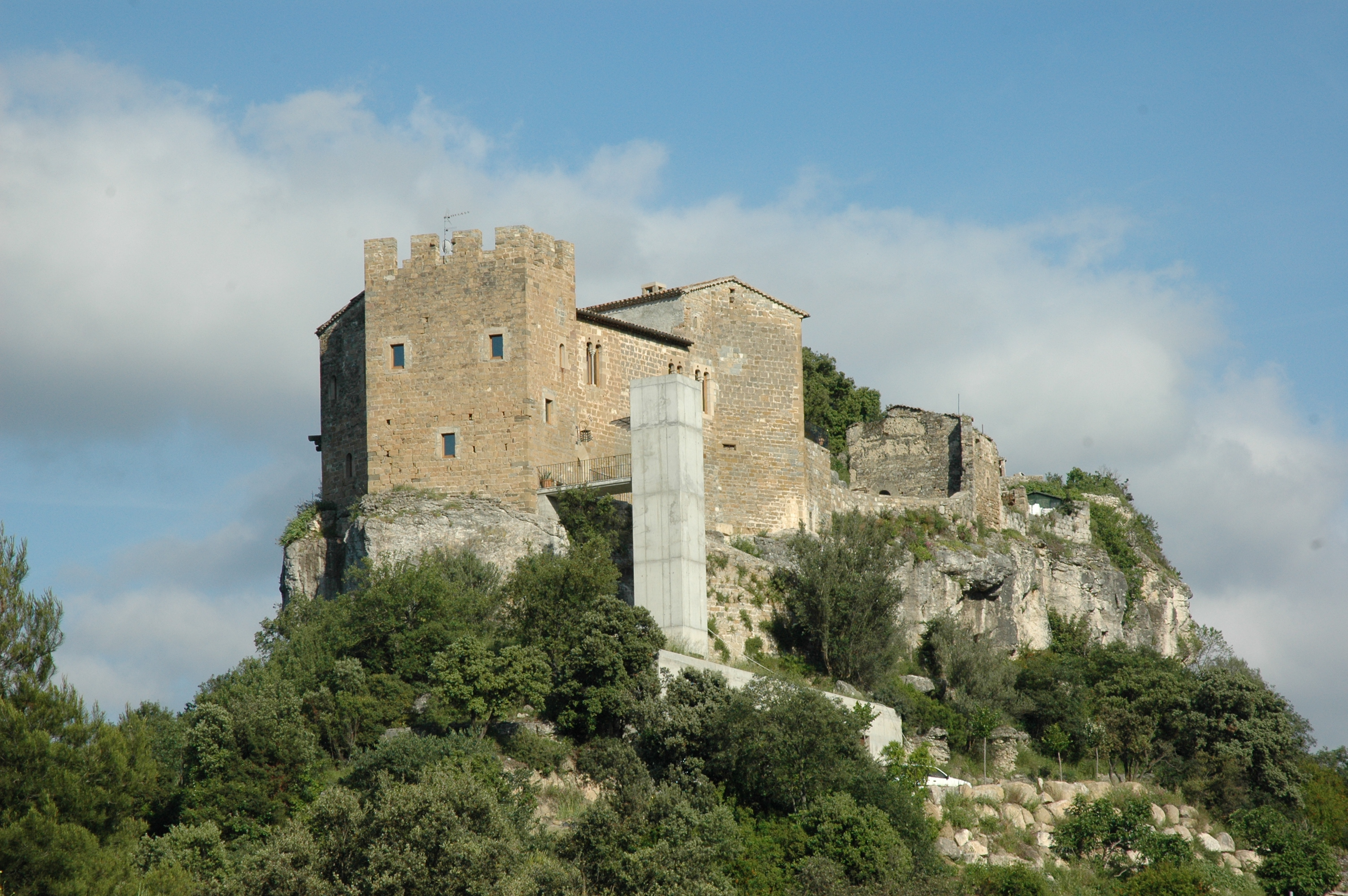
Castle of the Marquesses in Castellbell i el Vilar, Barcelona

== Marquesses of Castellbell (1702) ==
- José de Amat y Planella, 1st Marquess of Castellbell (1670–1715)
- José de Amat y Junyent, 2nd Marquess of Castellbell (1700–1770), eldest son of the 1st Marquess
- Cayetano de Amat y Rocabertí, 3rd Marquess of Castellbell (d. 1794), third son of the 2nd Marquess
- Manuel Cayetano de Amat y Peguera, 4th Marquess of Castellbell (1777–1846), only son of the 3rd Marquess
- Cayetano María de Amat y Amat, 5th Marquess of Castellbell (1803–1869), eldest son of the 4th Marquess
- Joaquín de Cárcer y Amat, 6th Marquess of Castellbell (1835–1923), son of Manuel de Amat y de Amat, second son of the 4th Marquess
- María de los Dolores de Cárcer y de Ros, 7th Marchioness of Castellbell (1867–1939), granddaughter of María Escolástica de Amat y de Amat, eldest daughter of the 4th Marquess
- Salvador de Vilallonga y de Cárcer, 8th Marquess of Castellbell (1891–1974), eldest son of the 7th Marchioness
- José Luis de Vilallonga y Cabeza de Vaca, 9th Marquess of Castellbell (1920–2007), eldest son of the 8th Marquess
- John Alfonso de Vilallonga y Scott-Ellis, 10th Marquess of Castellbell (b. 1947), eldest son of the 9th Marquess

== See also ==
- List of current grandees of Spain
