= Montpelier railway station, Jamaica =

List of designated National Heritage Sites in Jamaica

Montpelier

General information
- Coordinates: 18.372711°N 77.931798°W
- Owner: Jamaica Railway Corporation
- Line: Kingston to Montego Bay main line
- Platforms: Single
- Tracks: One

History
- Opened: c1894
- Closed: 1992-10
Location
- Location within Jamaica

Montpelier railway station opened in 1895 and closed in 1992. It served the village of Montpelier on the Kingston to Montego Bay line and was 103 miles (166 km) from the Kingston terminus. It is on the list of designated National Heritage Sites in Jamaica.

== Architecture ==
The station was constructed in 1895 of timber to a unique two-storey design in a combination of Jamaican Georgian and Victorian architectural styles. The ground floor is constructed of ashlar, the upper floor of timber. It has decorative fanlights, a Queen Ann entablature and pediment above the windows and a gable end zinc roof.

In 2003, it was reported as being in "very poor condition" and "in need of major repairs".

== Fares ==
In 1910 the third class fare from Montpelier to Kingston was 8/- (eight shillings); first class was about double.

== See also ==
- Railway stations in Jamaica
