= Baron Seaford =

Barony in the Peerage of the United Kingdom

Coat of arms Quarterly 1 & 4, Gules a chevron between in chief two bezants and in base a portcullis chained or (Booth); 2 & 3 Argent a cross gules between two penguins proper in the first and fourth quarters and two martlets azure in the second and third quarters.

Baron Seaford, of Seaford in the County of Sussex, is a title in the Peerage of the United Kingdom. It was created on 1 July 1826 for Charles Ellis, a Jamaican sugar planter and slave-owner who had earlier represented Heytesbury, Seaford and East Grinstead in the House of Commons. In 1798 he married the Hon. Elizabeth Catherine Caroline Hervey, daughter of John Hervey, Lord Hervey, eldest son of Frederick Augustus Hervey, 4th Earl of Bristol and 5th Baron Howard de Walden. In 1803 Lord Seaford's four-year-old son Charles Ellis inherited the barony of Howard de Walden from his great-grandfather and became the sixth Baron Howard de Walden (this title was created by writ in 1597; see the Baron Howard de Walden for earlier history of this peerage). In 1845 he also succeeded his father as second Baron Seaford.

Charles married in 1828 Lady Lucy Cavendish-Bentinck, daughter of William Bentinck, 4th Duke of Portland, and his wife Henrietta Scott. Through this marriage a substantial fortune came into the Ellis family, mainly based on property ownership in central London, and also their family Kilmarnock estate and Dean Castle, which was in use until 1975 and his since been run by East Ayrshire Council. His grandson, the eighth and fourth Baron, assumed in 1917 by Royal Licence his great-grandmother's surname of Scott in addition to that of Ellis. He was succeeded by his son, the ninth and fifth Baron respectively. On his death in 1999 the two baronies separated.

The barony of Howard de Walden fell into abeyance between the late Baron's four daughters, while the barony of Seaford, which could only be inherited through male lines, was passed on to his second cousin once removed, the sixth and (as of 2010) present holder of the title. He is the great-grandson of the Hon. William Charles Ellis, second son of the second Baron Seaford. Lord Seaford is also high in line of succession to the barony of Howard de Walden.

However, by Royal Warrant dated 25 June 2004, the Queen called the Barony of Howard de Walden out of abeyance in favour of the eldest daughter, Mary Hazel Caridwen Czernin (born 1935). In 1957 she had married Joseph Czernin, son of Count Franz Josef Czernin, a member of one of the oldest and most prominent noble families of the former Kingdom of Bohemia, now Czech Republic. By her husband she has five daughters and a son, Peter Joseph Czernin (born 1966), who is heir to the title.

== Barons Seaford (1826) ==
- Charles Rose Ellis, 1st Baron Seaford (1771–1845)
- Charles Augustus Ellis, 6th Baron Howard de Walden, 2nd Baron Seaford (1799–1868)
- Frederick George Ellis, 7th Baron Howard de Walden, 3rd Baron Seaford (1830–1899)
- Thomas Evelyn Scott-Ellis, 8th Baron Howard de Walden, 4th Baron Seaford (1880–1946)
- John Osmael Scott-Ellis, 9th Baron Howard de Walden, 5th Baron Seaford (1912–1999)
- Colin Humphrey Felton Ellis, 6th Baron Seaford (b. 1946)

The heir apparent is the present holder's eldest son, the Hon. Benjamin Felton Thomas Ellis (b. 1976)

== See also ==
- Baron Howard de Walden
- Marquess of Bristol
- Duke of Portland
