= Montpelier, Jamaica =

Settlement in Jamaica

Coordinates: 18.3630°N 77.9245°W

Montpelier is located near the western boundary of Saint James Parish, Jamaica, approximately 10 kilometres from the parish's capital Montego Bay. The Great River which marks the boundary between Saint James Parish and Hanover Parish separated the Old Montpelier and New Montpelier plantations from Shettlewood Pen. All three estates were owned by Lord Seaford. The modern day village takes its name from the Montpelier Plantation.

== Landmarks ==
- Montpelier railway station : Opened in 1895 and closed in 1992. It served the village of Montpelier on the Kingston to Montego Bay line and was 103 miles (166 km) from the Kingston terminus. It is on the list of designated National Heritage Sites in Jamaica.
- St.Mary's Anglican Church: St. Mary's Anglican Church is situated on the Montpelier Plantation, which dates back to the days of slavery. The cornerstone of the church is dated 1847. The church is a beautiful structure made of cut stone, and a pronounced pointed arch stone architrave defines the entrance. Along the sides of the building are pointed arch windows, which are indicative of Gothic architecture. At the rear of the structure is an outstanding multi-partite pointed arch window. The site on which the St. Mary's Anglican Church now stands was the scene of a noted slave uprising. Old Montpelier was one of the estates burnt by insurgents during the Baptist War in the western Parishes of Jamaica between 1831-1832.
- Express Plaza: A small plaza that's located on the Montpelier Main Road in the "Guinep Tree" area. It's owned by retired businessman Lyliod "Express" Thompson." It was built in the late 1980s.
