= Robert Davers =

Sir Robert Davers, 2nd Baronet may refer to:

- Sir Robert Davers, 1st Baronet (c. 1620–1685), of the Davers baronets
- Sir Robert Davers, 2nd Baronet (c. 1653–1722), MP for Bury St Edmunds and Suffolk
- Sir Robert Davers, 3rd Baronet (c. 1684–1723), of the Davers baronets
- Sir Robert Davers, 5th Baronet (1729–1763), British baronet and explorer

== See also ==
- Davers
