= Augustus Foster =

British diplomat and politician

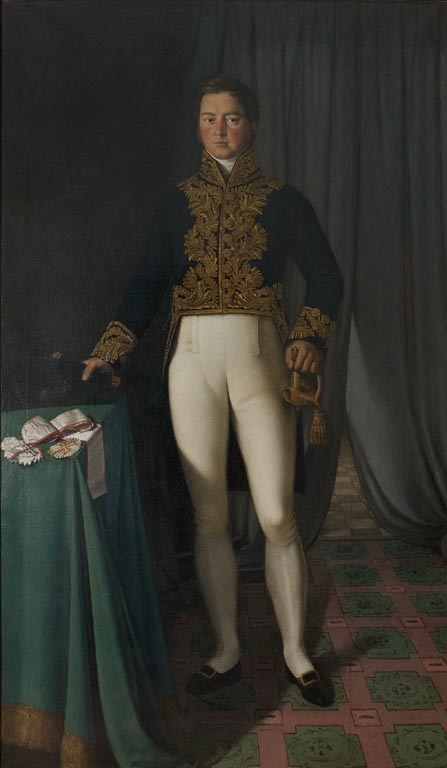
1825 portrait of Foster by Christian Albrecht Jensen

Sir Augustus John Foster, 1st Baronet, GCH PC (1 or 4 December 1780 – 1 August 1848) was a British diplomat and politician. Born into a notable British family, Foster served in a variety of diplomatic functions in continental Europe and the United States, interrupted by a short stint as a member of parliament. He wrote about his American experiences in Notes on the United States of America.

== Early life and family ==
Foster was born in 1780, possibly in Ireland, to John Thomas Foster (d. 1796) and Lady Elizabeth Hervey, daughter of Frederick Hervey, 4th Earl of Bristol. He went on to study at Drogheda Grammar School and Christ Church, Oxford.

He enjoyed a comfortable social situation; his father was the Irish MP for Ennis and first cousin of John Foster, 1st Baron Oriel and William Foster, and his mother, Lady Elizabeth Foster, would later go on to marry William Cavendish, 5th Duke of Devonshire, was herself the daughter of Frederick Hervey, 4th Earl of Bristol. Augustus had one older brother, Frederick (1777–1853) and an elder sister Elizabeth (b. 1778), who died several days after birth, as well as two illegitimate half-siblings fathered by Devonshire. Augustus's parents separated in 1781, at which time he and his brother remained in the care of his father while his mother moved to Chatsworth House.

He courted Anne Isabella Milbanke (later 11th Baroness Wentworth and wife of Lord Byron), but on 18 March 1815, one year after his arrival in Denmark, he married Albina Jane Hobart (2 May 1788 – 28 May 1867), daughter of Hon. George Vere Hobart (1761–1802), second son of George Hobart, 3rd Earl of Buckinghamshire. In 1832, she was raised to the rank of an earl's daughter by royal order — and was thus styled Lady Albina — after her brother, George Hobart, 5th Earl of Buckinghamshire, succeeded their uncle as Earl of Buckinghamshire.

He and Lady Albina would go on to have three sons:

- Frederick George (3 January 1816 – 25 December 1857), succeeded as 2nd Baronet
- Rev. Cavendish Hervey (7 May 1817 – 27 November 1890), succeeded as 3rd Baronet
- Vere Henry Louis (1819–1900), philanthropist and educationalist

== Career ==
Between roughly 1802 and 1804 Foster served as the Secretary to British legation, Naples, Kingdom of the Two Sicilies. In 1805 he was sent to the United States as the Secretary to British legation, leaving in 1807 to become British chargé d'affaires, Stockholm, Sweden from 1808 to 1810. He was sent back to America in 1811 as Minister Plenipotentiary to the United States, and while there penned letters to President Madison and his cabinet protesting American incursions in Spanish West and East Florida. He returned to Britain in 1812 with the outbreak of the War of 1812, where he was promptly elected by Cockermouth, England to the House of Commons.

In 1814 he left for Copenhagen, Denmark, where he would serve as British minister plenipotentiary until 1824.

In 1822 he became a Privy Councillor. Following his decade in Denmark, he returned to Italy as British minister plenipotentiary to Turin, Kingdom of Sardinia where he would stay from 1824 to 1840. During this time he was knighted by King George IV (1825) and named Baronet of Glyde Court, Ardee (1831), a town in County Louth, Ireland.

== Later life ==
Ending his service in Turin and his career in the British diplomatic service in 1840, Foster began drafting his Notes on the United States of America.

Foster died in 1848 after cutting his throat at Branksea Castle; he had suffered from delirium because of poor health, and his death was ruled as the result of temporary insanity. His Notes on the United States of America would be rediscovered in a cupboard of his family's home in Northern Ireland in the 1930s, and published posthumously.

== Ancestry ==
Ancestors of Augustus Foster

8. Foster
4. Rev. Thomas Foster
2. John Thomas Foster
10. Burgh
5. Dorothy Burgh
1. Sir Augustus Foster, 1st Baronet
24. John Hervey, 1st Earl of Bristol
12. John Hervey, 2nd Baron Hervey
25. Elizabeth Felton
6. Frederick Hervey, 4th Earl of Bristol
26. Brig.-Gen. Nicholas Lepell
13. Mary Lepell
27. Mary Brooke
3. Lady Elizabeth Hervey
28. Sir Robert Davers, 2nd Baronet, of Rougham
14. Sir Jermyn Davers, 4th Baronet, of Rougham
29. The Hon. Mary Jermyn
7. Elizabeth Davers
30. Rev. Edward Green
15. Margaretta Green
31. Margaret

== Works ==
- Foster, Augustus John; Davis, Richard Beale (1954). "Jeffersonian America: Notes on the United States of America". HathiTrust Digital Library. San Marino, California: Henry E. Huntington Library & Art Gallery.
- Foster, Augustus John (1980). Davis, Richard Beale (ed.). Jeffersonian America: Notes on the United States of America. Westport, Connecticut: Greenwood Press. ISBN 978-0313220760. OCLC 715269355.

== Footnotes ==
Diplomatic posts
Preceded by Francis Jackson	British Minister to the United States; 1811–1812	Succeeded by No representation due to the War of 1812
Preceded by Alexander Hope	British Minister to Denmark; 1814–1824	Succeeded by Henry Watkin Williams-Wynn
Preceded by William Hill	Minister at Turin; 1824–1840	Succeeded by Ralph Abercromby
Parliament of the United Kingdom
Preceded by Sir John Lowther; Viscount Lowther	Member of Parliament for Cockermouth; 1812–1813; With: Viscount Lowther	Succeeded by Thomas Wallace; Viscount Lowther
Baronetage of the United Kingdom
New creation	Baronet (of Glyde Court); 1831–1848	Succeeded by Frederick Foster
