= James Reynolds (junior) =

English lawyer and politician

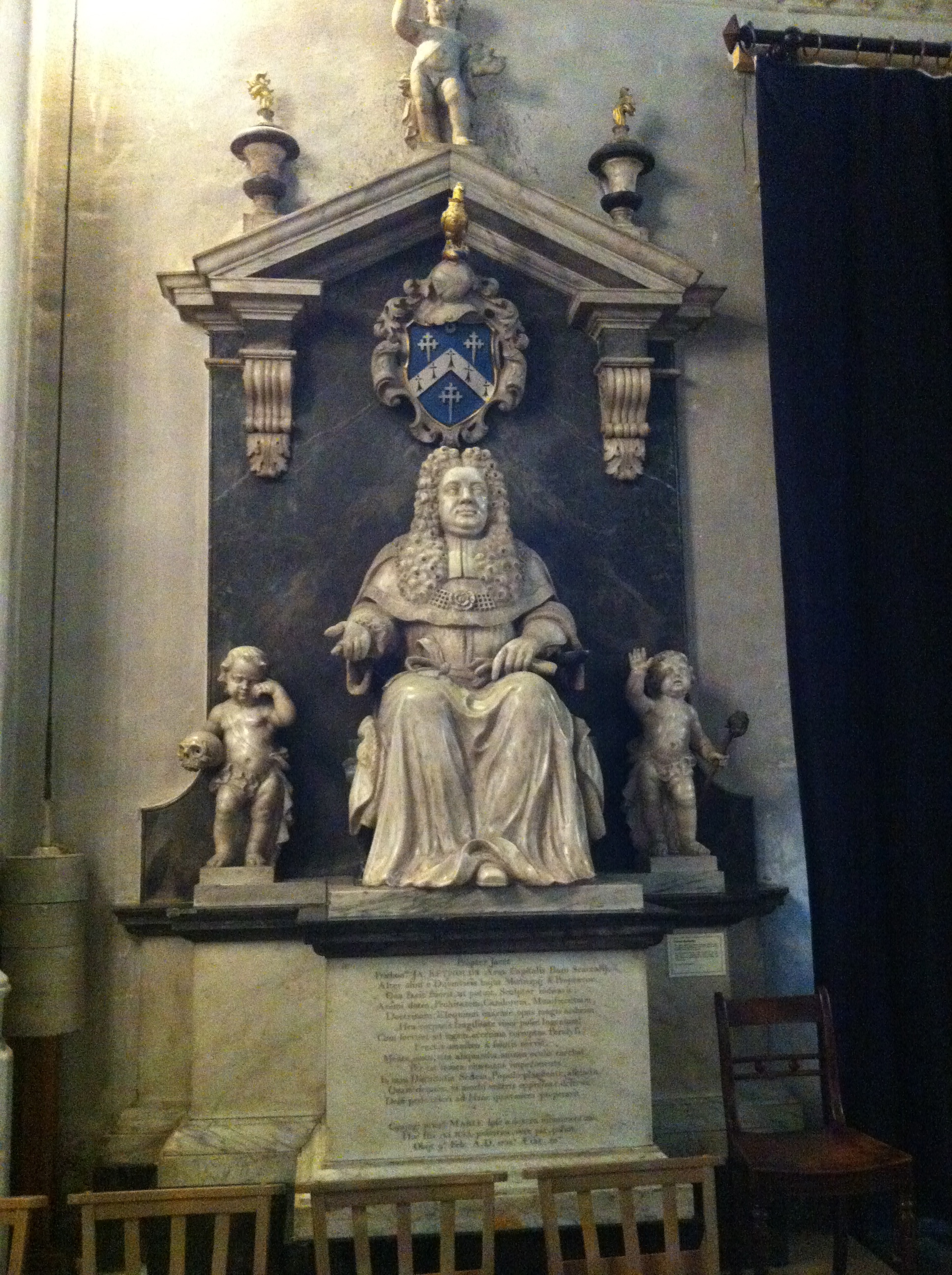
Memorial to James Reynolds in St. Edmundsbury Cathedral

Sir James Reynolds (1686–1739) was an English lawyer and politician who sat in the House of Commons from 1717 until 1725 when he was appointed a judge. He was Lord Chief Baron of the Exchequer from 1730 to 1738. He should not be confused with his close relative (most likely his nephew) Sir James Reynolds who was Chief Justice of the Irish Common Pleas in the same era.

Reynolds was the son of James Reynolds of Helions Bumpstead in Essex and his second wife Bridget Parker. He was educated at Bury Grammar School and was admitted at Queens' College, Cambridge in 1702 and at Middle Temple in 1703. He then entered Lincoln's Inn in 1705 and was called to the Bar in 1712.

Reynolds became Recorder of Bury St Edmunds in 1712 and Serjeant-at-law in 1715. He was returned as Member of Parliament for Bury St Edmunds at a by-election on 16 May 1717. At the 1722 general election, he was elected MP for Bury St Edmunds again. He vacated his seat and his position as Recorder on 2 April 1725 when he was appointed a judge of the Court of King's Bench.

As a barrister, Reynold's most notable case was the lawsuit on the question as to whether King George I had sole rights over the care and education of his grandchildren (1718). He argued unsuccessfully that the future King George II had the right to determine how his children should be educated. George I showed that he did not bear any grudge against Reynolds by appointing him a judge of the Court of King's Bench in 1725. George II made him Chief Baron in 1730. He retired, apparently for health reasons, in 1738 and died the following February. He was buried in St. Edmundsbury Cathedral, and a memorial was raised to him there. He married twice, firstly to Mary Smith and secondly to Alice Rainbird, but had no children.

Foss praises him as a judge who throughout his career endeavoured to do his duty "without fear or affection, prejudice or passion".

The year after his death another Sir James Reynolds, who had been Chief Justice of Common Pleas in Ireland, was appointed a Baron of the English Court of Exchequer. Their precise relationship has been a matter of some debate, but it seems that the Chief Baron, though two years younger, was the Irish Chief Justice's uncle, the latter being the son of Robert Reynolds, a much older half-brother of the Chief Baron.

Parliament of Great Britain
Preceded by Aubrey Porter; Lord Hervey	Member of Parliament for Bury St Edmunds; 1717– 1725; With: Lord Hervey 1717-1722; Sir Jermyn Davers, Bt 1722-1725	Succeeded by Lord Hervey; Sir Jermyn Davers, Bt
Legal offices
Preceded by Sir Thomas Pengelly	Chief Baron of the Exchequer; 1730–1736	Succeeded by Sir John Comyns
