= Louisa Jenkinson, Countess of Liverpool =

Wife of the British Prime Minister

The Right Honourable The Countess of Liverpool
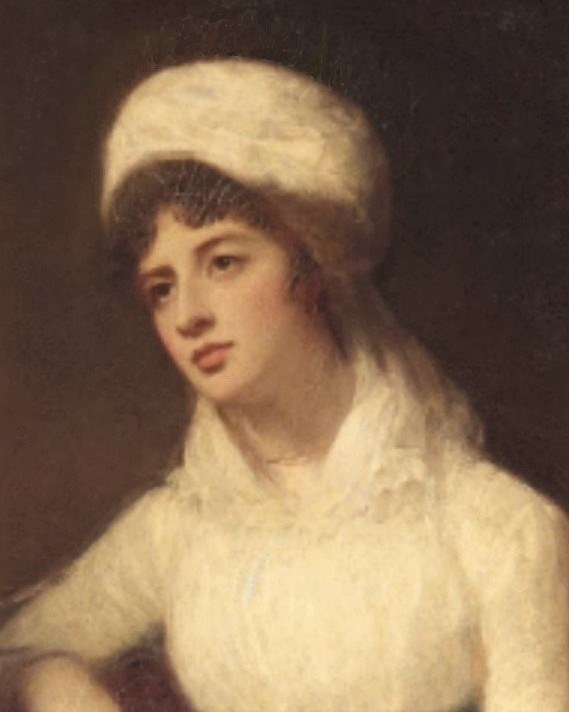
- Lady Louisa in 1793
- Born: Louisa Theodosia Hervey; February 1767; Ickworth, Suffolk, England
- Died: 12 June 1821 (aged 54); London, England
- Known for: Spouse of the prime minister of the United Kingdom (1812–1821)
- Spouse: Robert Jenkinson, 2nd Earl of Liverpool (m. 1795)
- Parents: Frederick Hervey, 4th Earl of Bristol (father); Elizabeth Davers, Countess of Bristol (mother)
- Relatives: Her five siblings included: Frederick Hervey, 1st Marquess of Bristol, and Elizabeth Cavendish, Duchess of Devonshire

Louisa Theodosia Jenkinson, Countess of Liverpool (née Hervey; February 1767 – 12 June 1821) was a British noblewoman and the first wife of Robert Jenkinson, 2nd Earl of Liverpool, who served as prime minister from 1812 to 1827.

== Biography ==
=== Early years and marriage ===
Louisa Hervey was born in February 1767, the youngest daughter of Frederick Hervey, 4th Earl of Bristol and Bishop of Derry, and Elizabeth Davers Countess of Bristol. She had three brothers, including John, Lord Hervey and Frederick, 1st Marquess of Bristol; and two sisters, Lady Mary Erne and Elizabeth Cavendish, Duchess of Devonshire.

In 1777, the family visited Italy. Here Louisa, then aged 10, contracted severe malaria and, due to the need to convalesce, only returned to England in September 1779. In December 1779, she became Lady Louisa Hervey on her father's elevation to Earl of Bristol on the death of his brother.

In 1782, when Louisa was aged 15, her parents separated, after which she lived her mother at Ickworth in Suffolk. Here she had an isolated existence, with no companions her own age. Most of her time was spent with her mother, who sought to instill strong religious and moral principles; for example Louisa made clothes for a poor girl she was maintaining at school. In 1785, Louisa and her mother moved to London, which widened her social circle. She also had regular correspondence with her father.

In 1793, Louisa met Robert Jenkinson, a Member of Parliament and the son of Lord Hawkesbury, the future Earl of Liverpool. Robert frequently visited Louisa and her mother in Wimbledon, Surrey, where they had recently moved. By November 1794, they had agreed to marry. Louisa's father consented to the marriage and promised a dowry of £10,000. However. Robert's father was strongly opposed, preferring his son, still only 24, unmarried until he was thirty unless 'he should marry a fortune indeed'. Louisa was a friend of the wife of Henry Dundas, then serving in the cabinet of William Pitt. Pitt was sympathetic and, after both Pitt and the King intervened, Lord Hawkesbury finally gave his consent.

Robert and Louisa were married on 25 March 1795. He was aged 24, and she 28.

=== Statesman's wife ===
In the years after their marriage, Robert held various political posts, entering the cabinet in 1801. He continued to sit in the House of Commons until 1803 when, as Baron Hawkesbury, he was elevated to the House of Lords. He became 2nd Earl of Liverpool on the death of his father in December 1808. Louisa, who had been Baroness of Hawkesbury since 1803, now became Countess of Liverpool.

Robert was appointed prime minister in June 1812, succeeding the assassinated Spencer Perceval, and would remain in that post until after Louisa's death in 1821.

Although Lady Louisa often found the role of politician's wife tiring, she relished the excitement of attending functions and being close to great events. Loyal and supportive of her husband, she took a keen interest in his political work, and sometimes helped him by copying confidential documents, while his friend Thomas Lawrence thought Robert communicated much information to his wife and asked her opinion on many of his letters. She was known to dislike George Canning, who finally succeeded Robert as prime minister, and was fearful of his influence over her husband. The couple clearly had a close relationship, with Louisa being a 'constant solace' to Robert among the pressures of high office. Their lack of children was, however, a disappointment to her.

In addition, Louisa involved herself in charity work, providing relief to the poor and infirm and helping to comfort the dying. This was largely motivated by her strong religious convictions, speaking to her sister Lady Erne of the large number of needy "who I can not assist who are sick and destitute and suffering, whilst I am surrounded with comforts far beyond my deserts". In one letter she wrote that she hoped the people she helped were instilled with "a sense of religious duty and religious comfort".

In 1809, the couple moved to Fyfe House, in Whitehall, London where they continued to live, even after Robert became prime minister in 1812. They also spent much of their time at their country estate at Coombe House, near Kingston upon Thames in Surrey. The Liverpools employed architect John Soane to improve and extend the property, where Louisa was hostess to a number of important visitors, including the King in 1805 and Tsar Alexander I of Russia in 1814.

=== Health and death ===
Lady Louisa was not strong physically and while she enjoyed her position, including attending official events and entertaining, she easily tired and was prone to colds and headaches. As early as 1801 she sometimes took opium based draughts to help her sleep. In 1816, aged 49, she became sufficiently ill for the Prince Regent to express concern. Although her health improved, she did not fully recover, and by early 1818 reports of her ill health began to appear in the newspapers. From the summer of 1820, her condition deteriorated further, and was nursed by her sister Lady Erne at Coombe House.

Louisa died at Fyfe House in London on 12 June 1821 aged 54, and was interred in the Jenkinson family vault at the Church of St Mary, Hawkesbury, Gloucestershire. Very distressed at his loss, Robert received support from other members of the ruling establishment – for the first part of her journey to Hawkesbury, Louisa's cortège was followed by over seventy carriages of sympathetic peers and gentry, including the Royal Dukes of York and Clarence, and the Duke of Wellington. Robert was remarried in September 1822 to Lady Mary Chester, a long-time friend of Louisa. He retired as prime minister on 9 April 1827 due to poor health, and died on 4 December 1828. He was also interred at St Mary's Church Hawkesbury.

Lady Louisa has a memorial in All Saints Church, Kingston upon Thames, Surrey, where she had been a regular worshiper. It consists of a seated life-size marble statue of Louisa as a young woman, sculpted by Sir Francis Chantrey. The pedestal bears the inscription: Louisa Theodosia, Countess of Liverpool, born February, 1767, died June, 1821. She visited the fatherless and widows in their affliction and kept herself unspotted from the world. The memorial was originally placed in Lord Liverpool's residence at Coombe House, and moved to the church after his death.

== Portraits of Lady Louisa ==
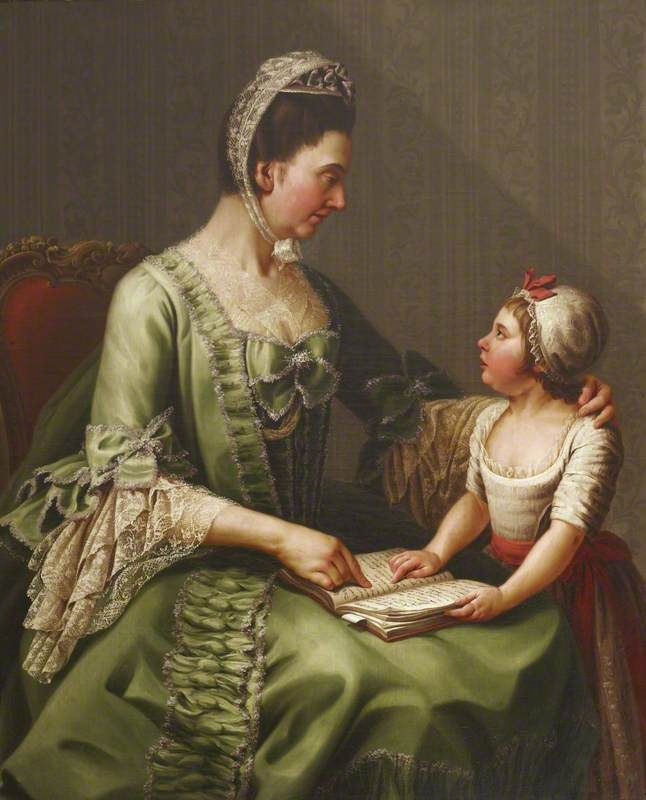
In 1773, aged 6, with her mother. Painted by Antonio de Bittio

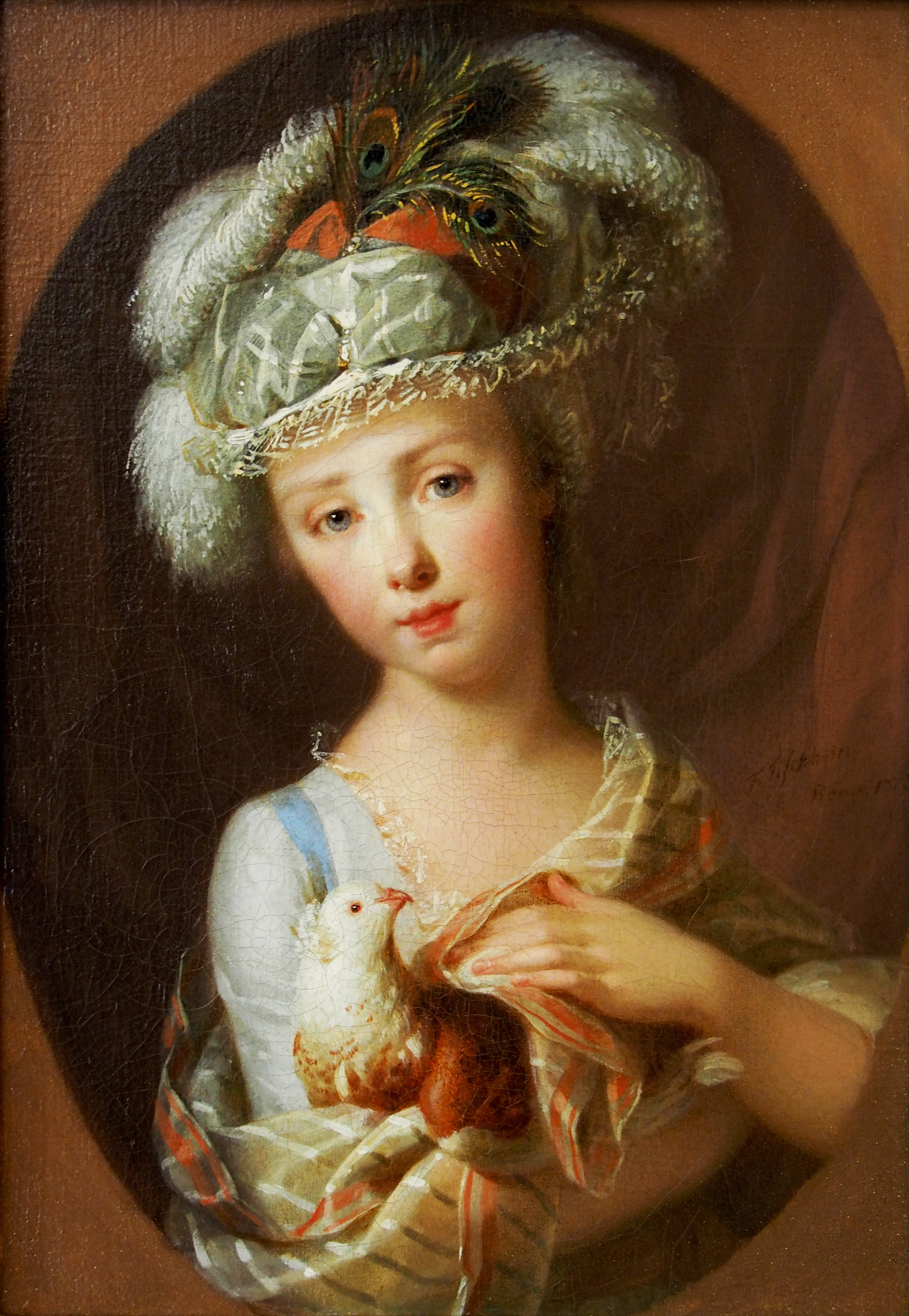
In 1778, aged 11. Painted by Johann Tischbein

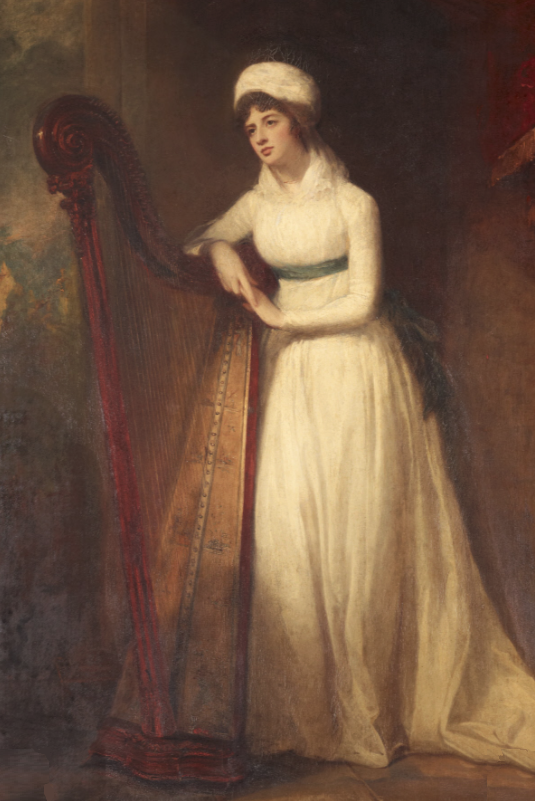
In 1793, aged 26. Painted by George Romney

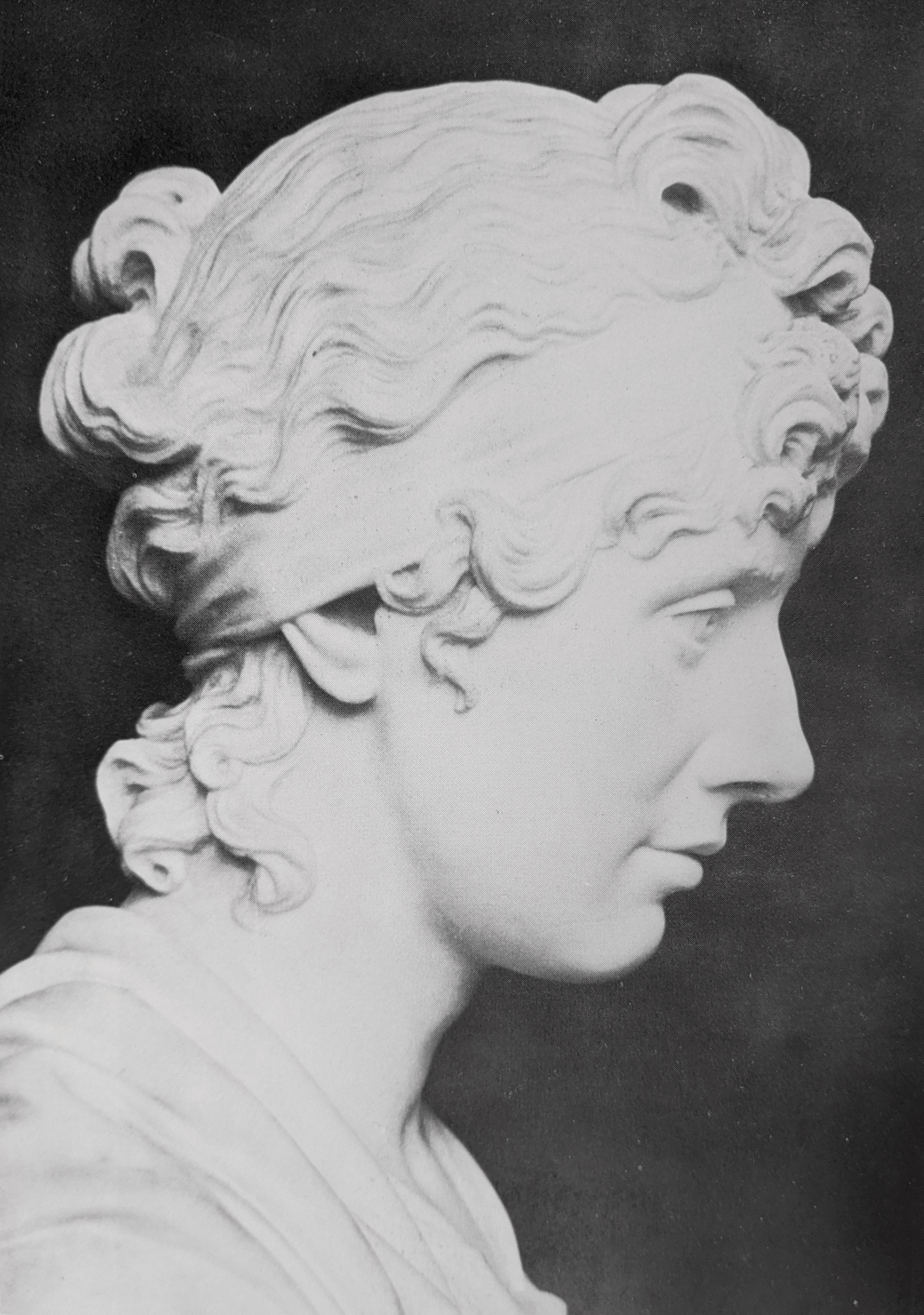
In 1801, aged 34. Sculptured by Joseph Nollekens

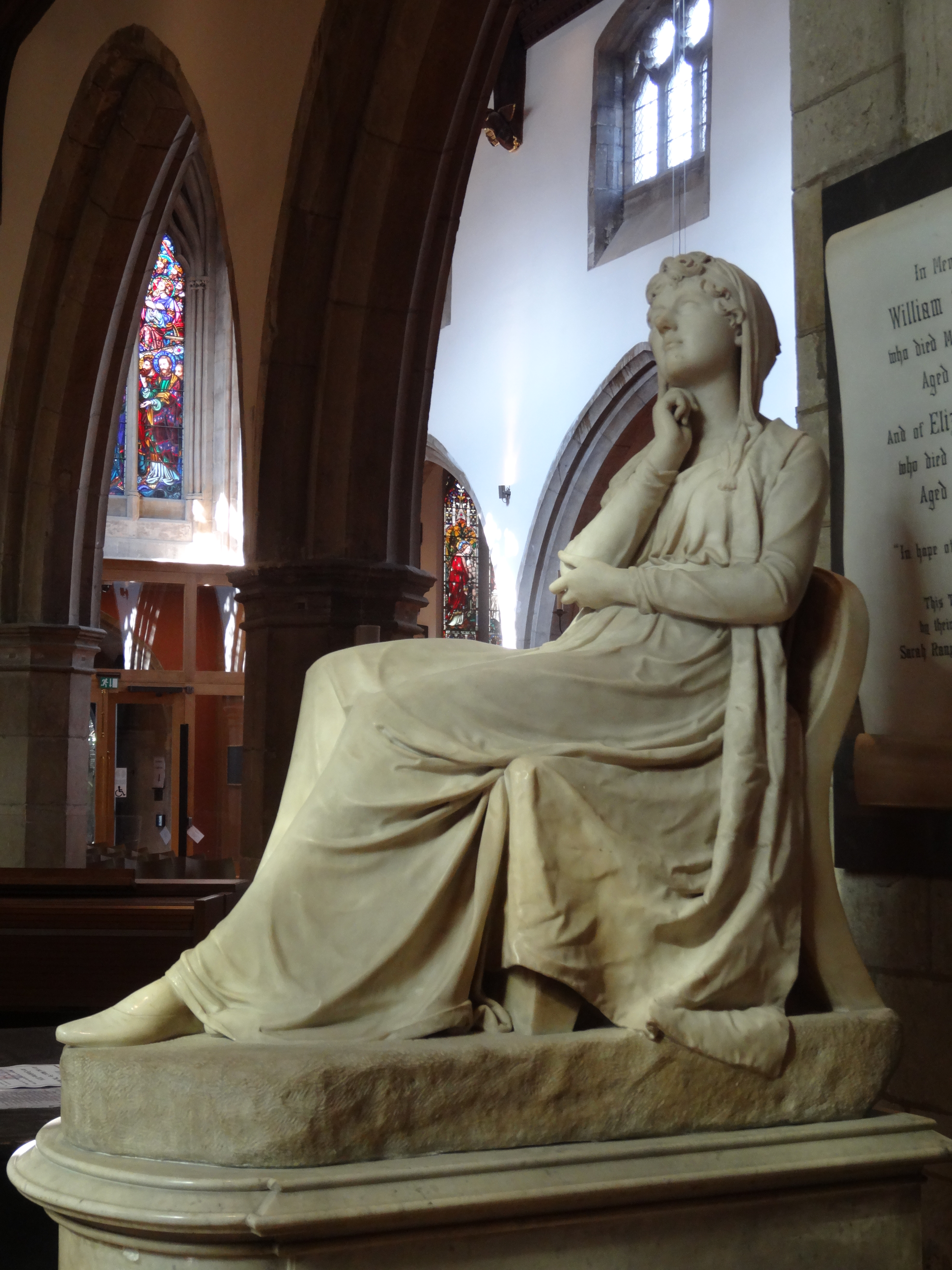
Memorial by Sir Francis Chantrey

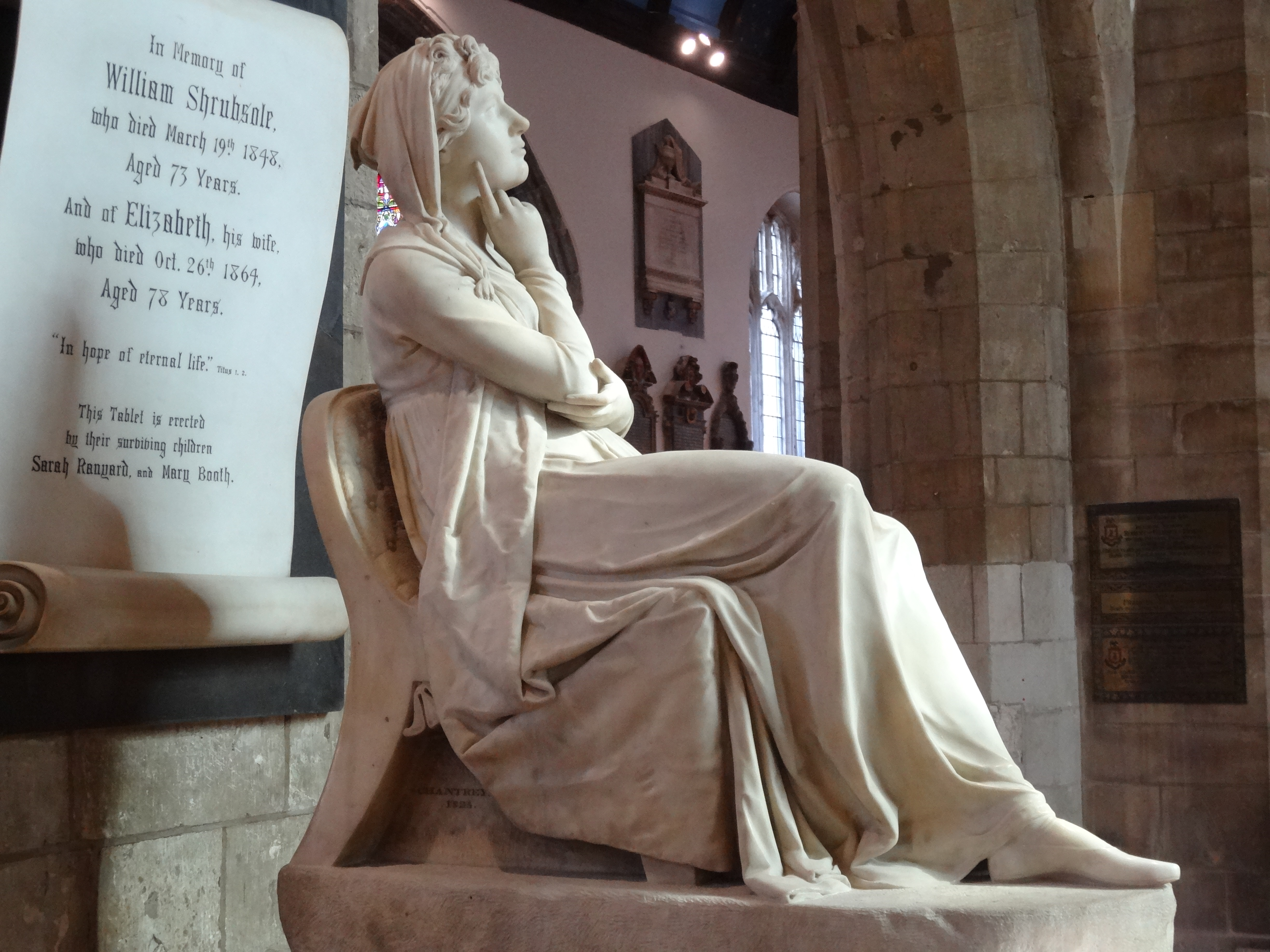
Memorial by Sir Francis Chantrey

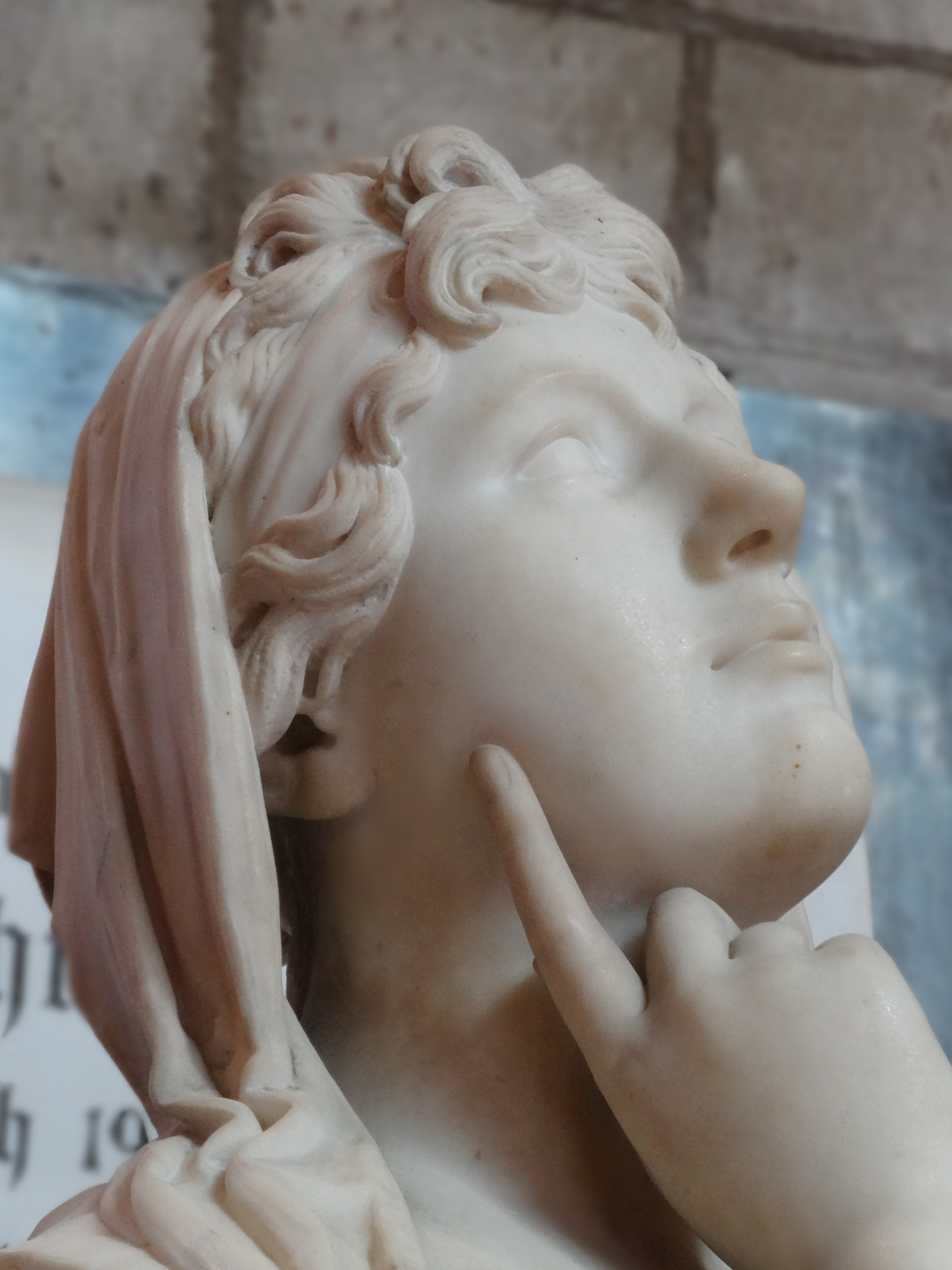
Memorial by Sir Francis Chantrey

== Bibliography ==
- Biden, William Downing (1852). The History and Antiquities of the Ancient and Royal Town of Kingston-upon-Thames. William Lindsey, Kingston. Accessed 21 March 2020
- Brock, William Ranulf (1943). Lord Liverpool and Liberal Toryism 1820 to 1827. Cambridge University Press. Accessed 21 March 2020
- Gash, Norman (1984). Lord Liverpool: The Life and Political Career of Robert Banks Jenkinson, Second Earl of Liverpool, 1770–1828. Harvard University Press. ISBN 9780674539105.
- Gash, Norman (2004). "Jenkinson, Robert Banks, second earl of Liverpool (1770–1828)". In Matthew, Henry Colin Gray; Harrison, Brian Howard (eds.). Oxford dictionary of national biography: from the earliest times to the year 2000. Vol. 29. Oxford University Press. ISBN 978-0-19-861379-4.
- Petrie, Charles (1954). Lord Liverpool and His Times. J. Barrie. ISBN 9787800284403.
