= Davers =

Davers may refer to:

- Davers Ile
- Davers baronets
- Robert Davers (disambiguation)
- Thomas Davers (1689-1746), Royal Navy officer
