= Vere Foster =

Anglo Irish philanthropist (1819–1900)

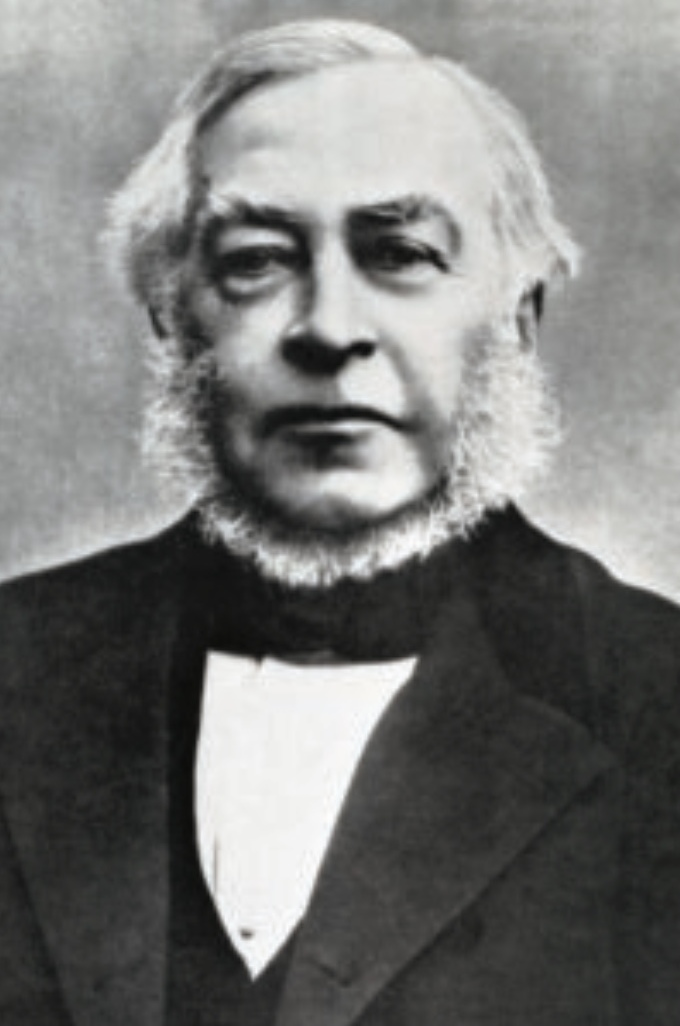
Vere Foster

Vere Henry Louis (or Lewis) Foster (25 April 1819 – 21 December 1900) was an Anglo-Irish philanthropist, educationalist and free thinker. After following his Irish father into the British diplomatic service, with postings in South America, in Ireland he was moved by the Great Famine to organise relief efforts and to improve the conditions of passage for emigrants. He experienced these while travelling steerage to the United States. Later, he supported National Schools in Ireland and was first president of what is today Ireland largest teachers' union the Irish National Teachers' Organisation. He died in Belfast, where he had been working for the relief of the sick and the poor.

== Early life ==
Foster was born in Copenhagen on 25 April 1819, where his Anglo-Irish father, Sir Augustus John Foster, was the British minister. His mother, Albinia Jane was the granddaughter of George Hobart, 3rd Earl of Buckinghamshire. He was educated at Eton College, and matriculated at Christ Church, Oxford, on 30 May 1838.

Leaving Oxford without a degree, Foster joined the diplomatic service on an unpaid basis. From 1842 to 1843 he was attached to the diplomatic mission of Sir Henry Ellis in Rio de Janeiro, and from 1845 to 1847 to that of Sir William Gore Ouseley in Montevideo. He alarmed his superiors, and his father, by the enthusiasm he evinced for Garibaldi and his Redshirts in the Uruguayan Civil War. The Foreign Office made no further use of his services after it ordered the Montevideo consulate closed in June 1847.

== Response to the Irish famine ==
When news reached England of the Irish famine, Foster was sent to report the effects on his family's estate, Glyde Court in County Louth. Their tenants were not the worst effected by the potato blight, but Foster was appalled by the numbers of starving people staggering along the roads, many trying to reach the ports in the hopes of finding passage to England or the United States. In August 1848, his father who been tortured by religious doubt, committed suicide. Returning again to Ireland, with his eldest brother Frederick, he toured the country and was persuaded to devote his junior share of his father's fortune (Frederick inherited the estate) to relieve the distress they witnessed.

He shed attachment to divine revelation and the established church, convinced that:

it is more pleasing, to be at peace than at enmity with one’s fellow creatures, and… that superior pleasure is derivable from doing that which is agreeable to the best interests of society rather than the contrary. This appears to me to be a practical religion, based on common sense and the best interests of mankind, to combine all the advantages of all other religions, with none of their mystery or faults.

He enrolled in the Glasnevin Model Farm in the hope of being able assist in the promotion of progressive techniques that would improve both the quantity and quality of foodstuffs produced in Ireland, and reduce the fatal dependence of poorer tenant farmers and cottiers on the potato. But such was the nature of landholding in Ireland and the scale of the crisis, that he believed that for many the surer prospect lay in emigration.

== Organises and assists emigration ==
Foster understood that women and girls were least able to improve their situation at home. With his brother's help, he set up a scheme whereby forty young women were able to secure passage to the United States, with food, clothing cooking utensils and money for essentials until they found employment. He then decided "to comprehend in the most practical manner every conceivable aspect of an endeavour or transaction in which he became involved." Dressed as a poor emigrant, with a former Glasnevin teacher, James Ward, in 1850 he travelled steerage to New York on one of the notorious “coffin ships”, contracting fever and, on arrival, remaining in hospital for some months. His reports of the appalling conditions they had witnessed, and those of his cousin Stephen de Vere who had taken a similar passage to Canada in 1847, helped prompt public debate and led to new legislation in Britain, Canada and the United States to regulate and improve the provision for emigrants aboard ship.

Back in Ireland, Fosterestablished an assisted emigration scheme in partnership with a reputable shipping agent. He drew on connections in Ireland and England to have the scheme recommended to public figures and employers in Washington and New York (where he won the support of the Catholic Archbishop John Hughes). He travelled twice yearly on inspection to North America, and out of his own pocket continued to assist emigrants until the outbreak of the American Civil War in 1861.

In 1879, with agricultural prices depressed and a developing Land War in Ireland, Foster again promoted female emigration to the United States and the British colonies. Young women were assisted, numbering 18,000 in 1880–3. He was supported in his projects by both Catholic and Protestant clergy.

== Educationalist and advocate for teachers ==
After the Famine, and recognising the problem illiteracy had posed emigrants, Foster took up the cause of national education in Ireland. This was a time of sectarian opposition to the national education system introduced by Richard Whately. Foster gave grants in aid of building new school-houses, 2,000 in his own lifetime. and at cost to his own pocket of £13,000.

Based on research he had himself conducted in Europe and North America, in 1865 Vere published in Belfast his own Head Line Copy Books. Sold for a penny, one million went into circulation in the first year. Copy books to teach business and accounting, drawing and painting followed. By 1872, Foster Copy Books had 172 titles and were used not only in Ireland but also by the Education Authority in New York and by Blackie and Son in Scotland and England.

In 1868, he helped establish the Irish National Teachers' Organisation, which remains Ireland's largest teachers' union. Determined that teaching be a recognised and supported profession, he advocated free teacher accommodation and pensions on retirement. He retired as president of INTO in 1873.

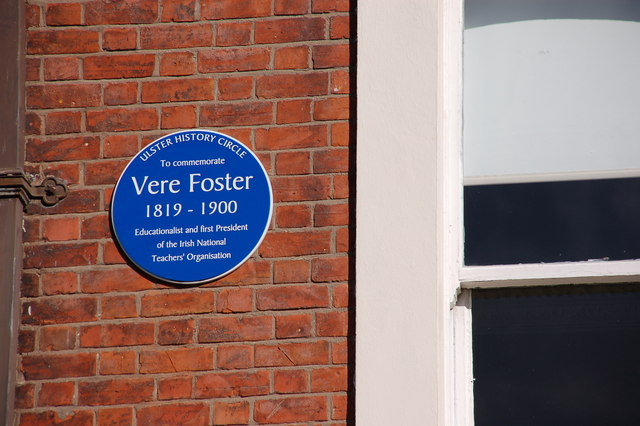
Vere Foster plaque, Belfast

== Death and commemoration ==
Foster died, unmarried, at Belfast on 21 December 1900 where, lodged in small attic room, he had been working since 1860s with a number of charities. These included the Royal Hospital, Belfast Day Nurseries, and the Belfast School of Art. Although he had exhausted his remaining fortune on these causes, when he died few newspapers honoured him with an obituary. His funeral cortege, which passed up Protestant Sandy Row and the largely Catholic Falls Road to the Belfast City Cemetery, was accompanied by barely a dozen mourners.

His name is remembered in Belfast in the Vere Foster Medical Practices on Sandy Row and the Falls Road, the former Vere Foster Primary School (1963-2011) on the Upper Springfield Road, and Vere Foster Walk (New Barnsley). He is also commemorated in Dublin by Irish National Teachers’ Organisation, at their head office, Vere Foster House in Parnell Square.

In 2002, the Ulster History Circle honoured Foster with a Blue Plaque at INTO's Belfast offices, 23 College Gardens, Belfast.

== Works ==
Foster was known also for a series of copybooks widely used in the United Kingdom, designed for Irish pupils:

- Elementary Drawing Copybooks, 1868.
- Copybooks, 1870.
- Drawing Copybooks, 1870.
- Advanced Water-colour Drawing, 1872.
- Public School Writing Copybooks, 1881.
- Simple Lessons in Watercolour, 1883.
- Drawing Books ... in Pencil and Watercolours, 1884.
- Painting for Beginners, 1884.
- Upright Writing Charts, 1897.

In 1898 he edited, as The Two Duchesses, the family correspondence of Georgiana Cavendish, Duchess of Devonshire (1757–1806) and Elizabeth Cavendish, Duchess of Devonshire (1759–1824).
