= Elizabeth Cavendish, Duchess of Devonshire =

English aristocrat (1758 - 1824)

Her Grace The Duchess of Devonshire
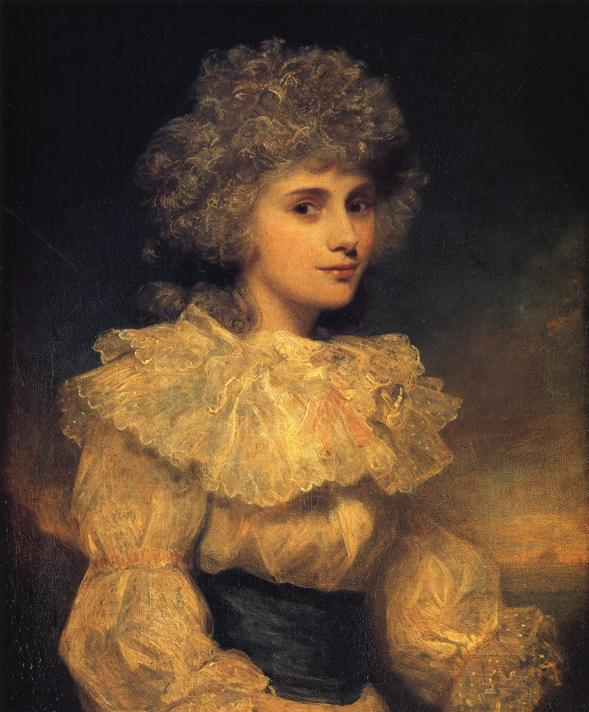
- Bess in 1787, painted by Sir Joshua Reynolds
- Born: 13 May 1758; Horringer, Suffolk, England
- Died: 30 March 1824 (aged 65); Rome, Papal States
- Title: Lady Elizabeth Foster; Duchess of Devonshire
- Spouses: John Thomas Foster (m. 1776; sep. 1781) William Cavendish, 5th Duke of Devonshire (m. 1809; died 1811)
- Children: Frederick Foster; Elizabeth Foster; Sir Augustus Foster, Bt; Caroline St Jules; Sir Augustus Clifford, Bt
- Parents: Frederick Hervey, 4th Earl of Bristol; Elizabeth Davers

Elizabeth Christiana Cavendish, Duchess of Devonshire (née Hervey; 13 May 1758 – 30 March 1824) was an English aristocrat and letter writer. She is best known as Lady Elizabeth Foster, the close friend of Georgiana Cavendish, Duchess of Devonshire. Elizabeth supplanted the Duchess, gaining the affections of William Cavendish, 5th Duke of Devonshire and later marrying him. Several of her letters are preserved.

== Life ==
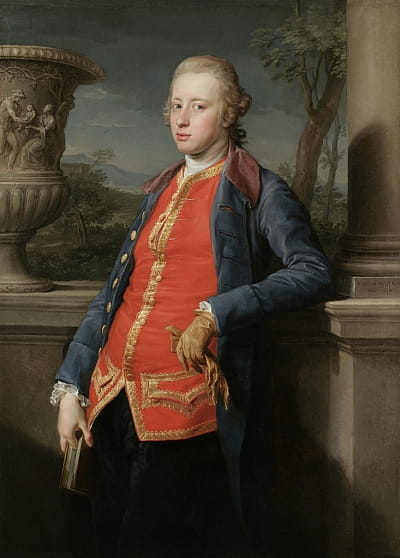
Portrait of the Duke of Devonshire by Pompeo Batoni, 1768. Elizabeth Foster's second husband, with whom she lived from 1782 on: William Cavendish, 5th Duke of Devonshire

Known as Bess, she was born Elizabeth Christiana Hervey on 13 May 1758, in a small house in Horringer, St Edmundsbury, Suffolk. She was daughter of Frederick Hervey, Bishop of Derry, who later became the fourth Earl of Bristol, and his wife, Elizabeth Davers (1733–1800), daughter of Sir Jermyn Davers, 4th Baronet. She had three brothers, including John, Lord Hervey and Frederick, 1st Marquess of Bristol; and two sisters, Lady Mary Erne and Louisa, Countess of Liverpool.

In 1776, Elizabeth married Irishman John Thomas Foster (1747–1796). He was a first cousin of the brothers John Foster, Baron Oriel, last Speaker of the (united) Irish House of Commons, and Bishop (William) Foster. The Fosters had two sons, Frederick (3 October 1777 – 1853) and Augustus John Foster (1780–1848). Their only daughter, also named Elizabeth, was born prematurely on 17 November 1778 and lived only eight days.

When her father succeeded as the earl in 1779, she became Lady Elizabeth Foster. The couple resided after 1779 with her parents at Ickworth House in Suffolk. The marriage was not a success, and the couple separated within five years, after Bess received reports of an "intrigue" between Foster and her maid, Madam Wagniere. Despite knowing that she would be destitute, Bess wrote to Foster, "it is my fixt wish & determination not to return to you." Foster retained custody of their sons and did not allow the boys to see Bess for 14 years.

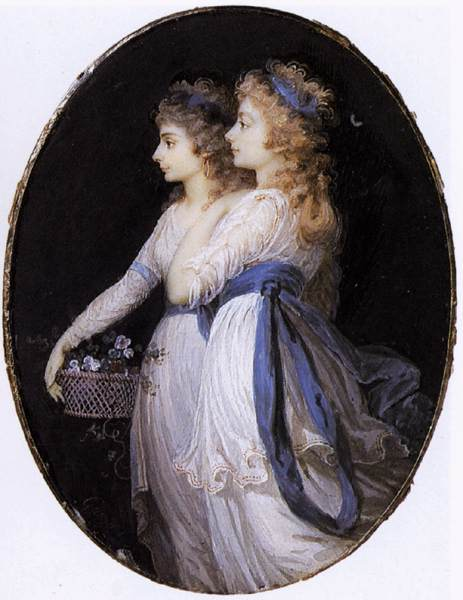
Lady Elizabeth with Georgiana, Duchess of Devonshire, by Guérin, ca. 1791

In May 1782, Bess met the Duke and Duchess of Devonshire in Bath, and quickly became Georgiana's closest friend. From this time, she lived in a ménage à trois with Georgiana and her husband, William, the 5th Duke of Devonshire, for about 25 years. She bore two illegitimate children by the Duke: a daughter, Caroline St Jules, and a son, Augustus (later Augustus Clifford, 1st Baronet), who were raised at Devonshire House with the Duke's legitimate children by Georgiana. Georgiana grew ill and died in 1806; three years later, Bess married the duke and became the Duchess of Devonshire. He died two years later.

Bess is also said to have had affairs with several other men, including Cardinal Ercole Consalvi, John Sackville, 3rd Duke of Dorset, Count Axel von Fersen, Charles Lennox, 3rd Duke of Richmond, and Valentine Quin, 1st Earl of Dunraven and Mount-Earl. Quin joined the Duchess as her travelling physician in Rome in December 1820, and afterwards attended her in that city during her fatal illness in March 1824.

Lady Elizabeth was a friend of the French author Madame de Staël, with whom she corresponded from about 1804.

Bess died on 30 March 1824, eighteen years to the day of Georgiana's death.

== Film portrayals ==
Lady Elizabeth Foster was depicted by Hayley Atwell in the 2008 film The Duchess.

== Children ==
With John Thomas Foster:

- Frederick (3 October 1777 – 1853)
- Elizabeth (17 November 1778 – 25 November 1778)
- Sir Augustus Foster, Bt (1780–1848)

With William Cavendish, 5th Duke of Devonshire (prior to their marriage):

- Caroline Rosalie Adelaide (1785–1830), who later, as Caroline St Jules, married The Hon. George Lamb, youngest son of Peniston Lamb, Viscount Melbourne
- Sir Augustus William James Clifford, Bt (1788–1877), married Albina Jane Hobart, granddaughter of George Hobart, 3rd Earl of Buckinghamshire; father of Vere Foster
