= Lord Hervey =

Lord Hervey may refer to:

- John Hervey, 2nd Baron Hervey (1696–1743), English courtier and political writer
- John Hervey, Lord Hervey (1757–1796), British diplomat
- Lord Arthur Hervey (1808–1894), Bishop of Bath and Wells
