= John Hervey, Lord Hervey =

British diplomat

Captain The Honourable Lord Hervey
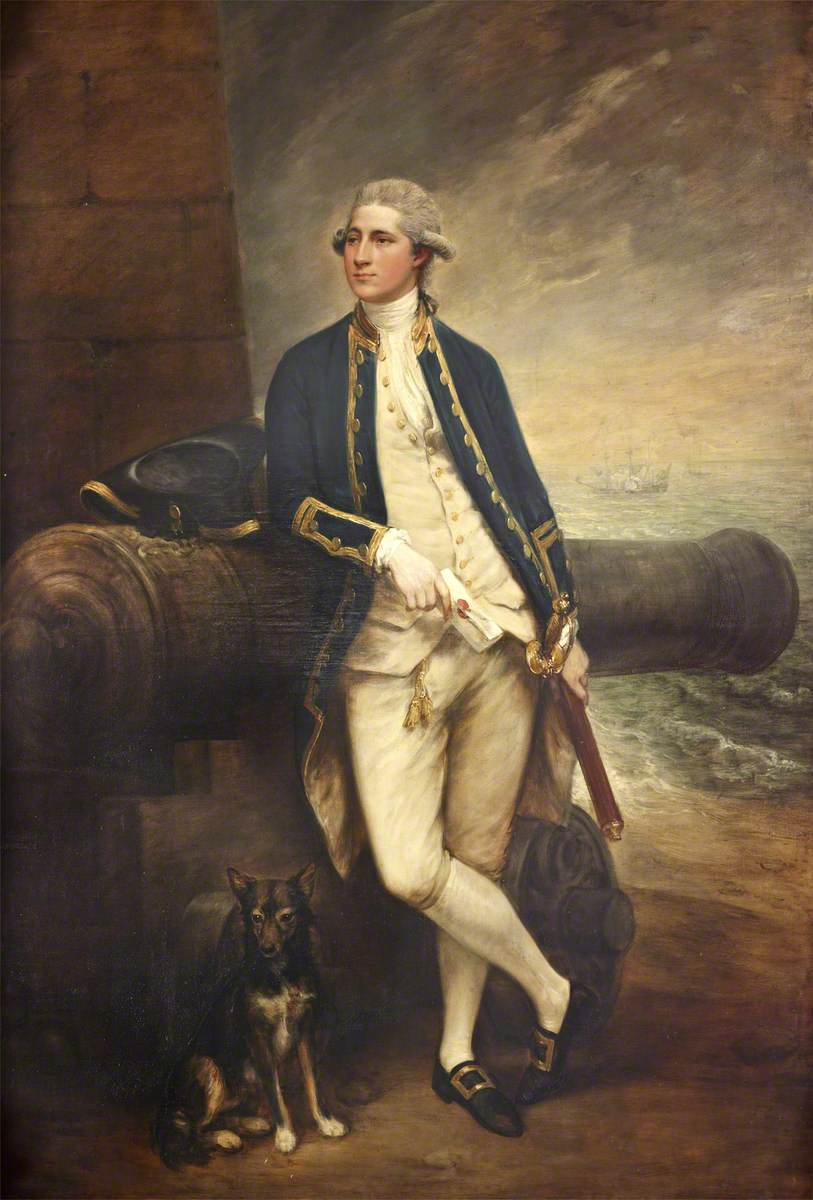
- Portrait of Lord Hervey, by Thomas Gainsborough, National Trust, c. 1779-1783.

British Minister to the Grand Duchy of Tuscany
- In office 1787–1794
- Preceded by: William Fawkener (pro tempore)
- Succeeded by: Hon. William Wyndham

Personal details
- Born: John Augustus Hervey; 1 January 1757
- Died: 10 January 1796 (aged 39)
- Spouse: Elizabeth Drummond (m. 1779, died)
- Children: Elizabeth Ellis, Baroness Seaford
- Parent(s): Frederick Hervey, 4th Earl of Bristol; Elizabeth Davers

Captain John Augustus Hervey, Lord Hervey (1 January 1757 – 10 January 1796) was a British diplomat.

== Early life ==
Hervey was the eldest surviving son of Frederick Hervey, 4th Earl of Bristol and his wife, Elizabeth née Davers (d. 1800). He had two brothers, including Frederick, 1st Marquess of Bristol; and three sisters, Mary Creighton, Countess Erne, Elizabeth Cavendish, Duchess of Devonshire and Louisa Jenkinson, Countess of Liverpool.

His paternal grandparents were John Hervey, 2nd Baron Hervey and Mary Lepell (a daughter of Brig.-Gen. Nicholas Wedig Lepell). His maternal grandparents were Sir Jermyn Davers, 4th Baronet, and Margaretta Green 9a daughter of Rev. Edward Green, Rector of Drinkstone).

== Career ==
Joining the Royal Navy under the patronage of his uncle, Commodore Augustus Hervey, 3rd Earl of Bristol, he reached the rank of Captain and was at one point the senior naval officer on the St. Lawrence River in Quebec. From 1787 to 1794, he was Minister to Tuscany, after which he returned to Naval service in command of the Zealous with the Mediterranean fleet during the winter of 1795.

== Personal life ==
On 4 October 1779, he married Elizabeth Drummond (1758–1818) at Quebec, Canada. She was the eldest daughter of the former Katherine Oliphant and Colin Drummond, of Megginch Castle, Perthshire, who was deputy Commissary-General and deputy Paymaster to the Forces in Canada (and son of John Drummond, 10th of Lennoch). Before his death in 1796, they were the parents of a daughter:

- Hon. Elizabeth Catherine Caroline Hervey (1780–1803), who married Charles Ellis, 1st Baron Seaford, the second son of John Ellis of Jamaica, a wealthy sugar farmer and slave trader.

Lord Hervey died on 10 January 1796. On his death in 1796, his courtesy title was assumed by his brother, Frederick (later created Marquess of Bristol). His widow died on 4 September 1818.

Diplomatic posts
Preceded by William Fawkener (pro tempore)	British Minister to Tuscany; 1787–1794	Succeeded by Hon. William Wyndham
