= Lord Charles Hervey =

English cricketer and cricketer

Lord Charles Amelius Hervey (1 November 1814 – 11 April 1880) was the fifth son of Frederick Hervey, 1st Marquess of Bristol, an English clergyman and a first-class cricketer who played in a single match for Cambridge University. His place of birth is not known in cricket and other directories, but the 1871 census return indicates he was born in London; he died at Great Chesterford, Essex.

== Cricket career ==
Hervey played in the 1835 match between Cambridge University and the Marylebone Cricket Club which has been recognised as first-class: he batted in the lower order and failed to score in either innings, and there is no record that he bowled or took a wicket, though the match scorecard is incomplete.

== Career outside cricket ==
Hervey was educated at Eton College and Trinity College, Cambridge. On graduation, he was ordained as a Church of England priest and from 1839 to his death in 1880 he was the rector of Great and Little Chesterford, Essex.
