= James Reynolds (judge) =

English judge

Sir James Reynolds (1684–1747) was an English judge who had a distinguished career in both Ireland and England, holding the office of Chief Justice of the Irish Common Pleas and subsequently Baron of the Exchequer in England. He should not be confused with his close relative (who was probably his uncle) Sir James Reynolds, junior, who was Chief Baron of the Exchequer from 1730 to 1738.

== Biography ==
He was born at Helions Bumpstead in Essex, son of Robert Reynolds and Kezia Tyrrell. He was educated at Eton College and Peterhouse, Cambridge, where he matriculated in 1703. He entered Lincoln's Inn in 1705 and was called to the Bar in 1712.

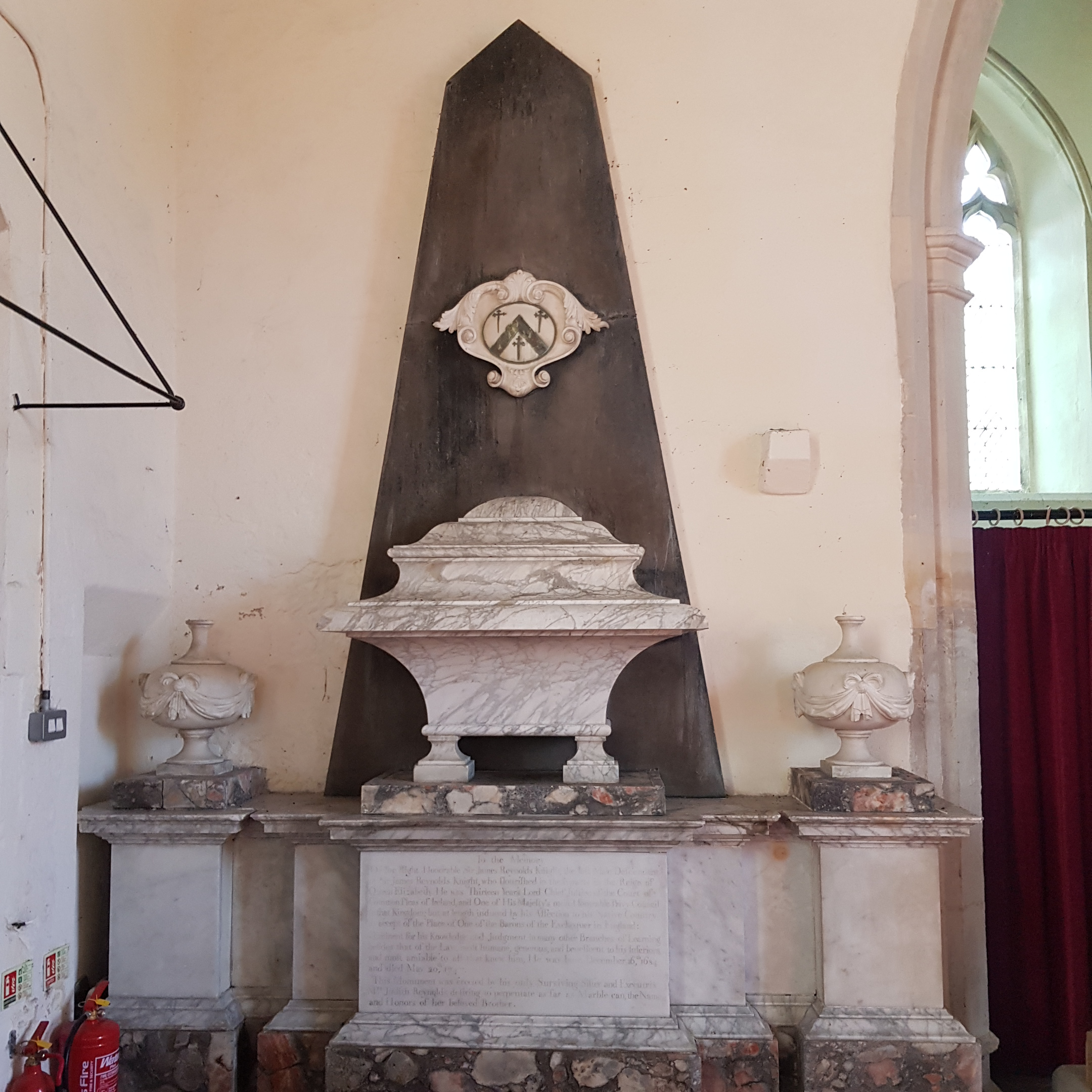
Sir James Reynolds (1684–1747) - memorial in All Saint's church, Castle Camps, South Cambs. UK

After only fourteen years legal practice, he was recommended for a senior judicial position in Ireland. The first suggestion was that he be made Irish Chief Baron but in fact, he became Chief Justice of the Common Pleas in 1727. According to Foss, he gave general satisfaction; certainly he was highly praised for his conduct of a much-publicised murder trial in 1731 when a student of Trinity College Dublin was charged with abetting the murder of a watchman. After an "excellent and impartial" summing-up by the judge, the student was acquitted, to general public approval. In 1739 he had strong hopes of becoming Lord Chancellor of Ireland but in the event, he was passed over in favour of Robert Jocelyn, 1st Viscount Jocelyn. However, Elrington Ball suggests, perhaps unfairly, that all English judges in Ireland longed for a place (even a junior place) on the English bench. Reynolds at any rate was happy to return to England as a Baron of the Court of Exchequer, of which his relative and namesake had until recently been Lord Chief Baron, in 1740. He was knighted and became a Bencher of Lincoln's Inn.

He died at Castle Camps, Cambridge in 1747. He never married but shared a house for many years with his unmarried sister Judith, who had a memorial erected to him in All Saint's church, Castle Camps.

His exact relationship with Chief Baron Reynolds has caused some difficulty; Foss concludes that the Chief Baron, though slightly the younger of the two, was the Irish judge's uncle, being the much younger half-brother of Robert Reynolds.

Legal offices
Preceded by William Whitshed	Chief Justice of the Irish Common Pleas; 1727–1740	Succeeded by Henry Singleton
