= Frederick Hervey, 4th Earl of Bristol =

Earl of Bristol

The Right Reverend and Right Honourable The Earl of Bristol
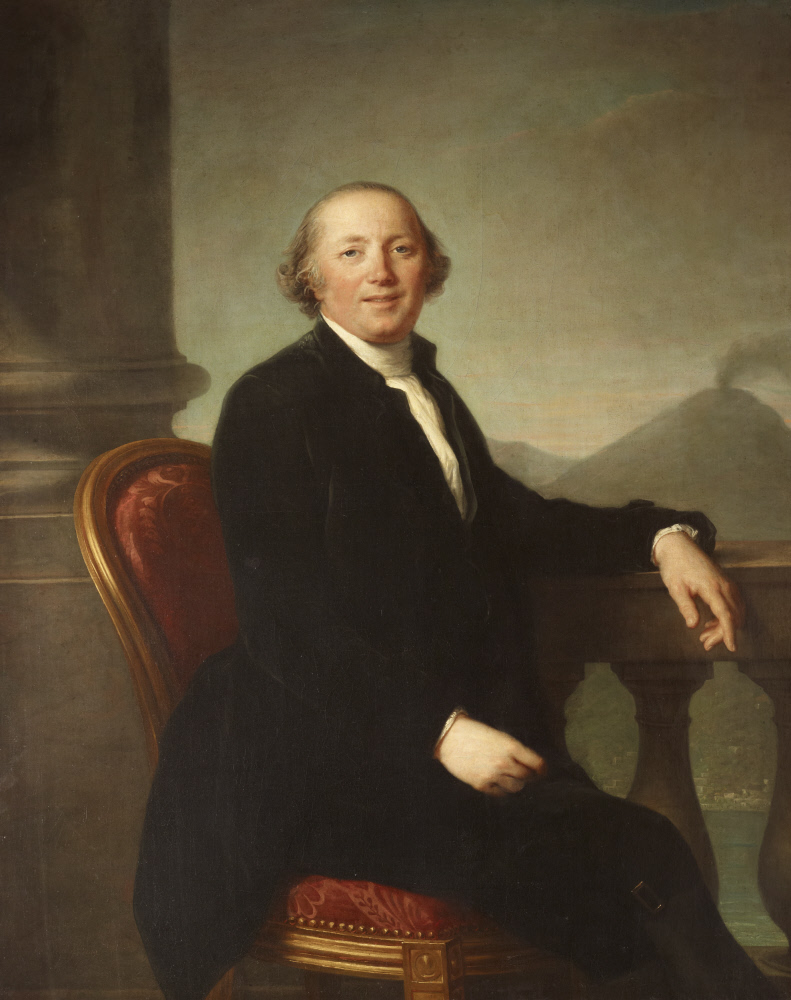
- Frederick, Lord Bishop of Derry
- Born: Frederick Augustus Hervey; 1 August 1730; Suffolk, England
- Died: 8 July 1803 (aged 72); Albano, Papal States
- Resting place: Ickworth Parish Church
- Other name: The Earl-Bishop
- Education: Westminster School; Corpus Christi College, Cambridge
- Occupations: Cleric, parliamentarian
- Known for: Patron of the arts and landowner
- Title: Bishop of Cloyne; Bishop of Derry; Earl of Bristol; Baron Hervey and Howard de Walden
- Spouse: Elizabeth Davers
- Children: Mary Creighton, Countess Erne; George Hervey; John Hervey, Lord Hervey; Elizabeth Cavendish, Duchess of Devonshire; Louisa Jenkinson, Countess of Liverpool; Frederick Hervey, 1st Marquess of Bristol
- Parents: John Hervey, 2nd Baron Hervey; Mary Lepell

Frederick Augustus Hervey, 4th Earl of Bristol, PC (Ire), FRS (1 August 1730 – 8 July 1803), was an 18th-century Anglican prelate.

Elected Bishop of Cloyne in 1767 and translated to the see of Derry in 1768, Hervey served as Bishop of Derry until his death in 1803.

He is remembered for designing mansions at Downhill and Ballyscullion, and he was known as the Edifying Bishop or the Earl-Bishop (in allusion to prince-bishop).

== Early life ==
Frederick Hervey was born in Suffolk, and attended Westminster School before going up to Corpus Christi College, Cambridge, where he read Law. He took an MA degree in 1754 and was later awarded a DD (Cantab) in 1770.

== Titles ==
Accorded the courtesy style The Honourable after his father's death in 1743, both of his brothers died without an heir. Thus he succeeded his immediate elder brother, Admiral Augustus Hervey, 3rd Earl of Bristol, in the title in December 1779, becoming the 4th earl. He also inherited the Hervey family's extensive ancestral estates centred on Ickworth House in Suffolk.

Hervey conceived the redevelopment of the Ickworth estate to a standard appropriate to his family's wealth, with the added practical purpose of housing his extensive art collection. Work started in 1794, but so ambitious was the project that by the time of his death in 1803 only the Rotunda had been constructed. However, his son Frederick (later Marquess of Bristol) took over and completed his father's vision for Ickworth House, eventually completing the wings and its gardens in 1830.

In 1799 the Howard de Walden barony by writ was called out of abeyance by the House of Lords Committee of Privileges in the 4th Earl of Bristol's favour. Thus he succeeded as 5th Baron Howard de Walden, a title which devolved upon him via his grandmother (Elizabeth, Countess of Bristol, the 1st earl's 2nd wife), who was daughter and heiress of Sir Thomas Felton and great-great-granddaughter of Sir Thomas Howard, KG (created a baron 1597).

Styled Bishop Hervey after his consecration on 31 May 1767, the following year he was translated as Lord Bishop of Derry, which became his formal ecclesiastical style until his death in 1803.

== Church career ==
Hervey was ordained in 1754 as a Fellow of Corpus Christi College and then became Clerk of the Privy Seal in 1756 and Principal Clerk in 1761 before appointment as a Royal chaplain in 1763.

Hervey then set off on an extended Grand Tour while awaiting ecclesiastical preferment. During his European travels, he developed his already insatiable passion for art.

His eldest brother, George, 2nd Earl of Bristol, became Lord Lieutenant of Ireland in 1766 and helped to secure his election as Bishop of Cloyne in 1767. Hervey displayed great enthusiasm for improving the property of the see of Cloyne which opened the way for his translation to the well endowed bishopric of Derry a year later. As Bishop of Derry, Hervey quickly developed a reputation for being "the most worldly, most eccentric, most talked-about priest in the Church of Ireland".

Hervey was Derry's most generous philanthropist, although some of the clergy in his diocese came to regard him as cheerfully sadistic, for such instances as when he instructed any portly priests coveting plum promotions to compete in midnight runs through bogs and marshland.

Given his family's wealth, Hervey both enjoyed personal luxury and expended large sums on building roads and developing agricultural enterprise within his diocese, including within the City of Derry.

Hervey was especially keen on architectural design and built mansions at Downhill and Ballyscullion; he then filled them with works of art from Italy and elsewhere.

== Political activity ==
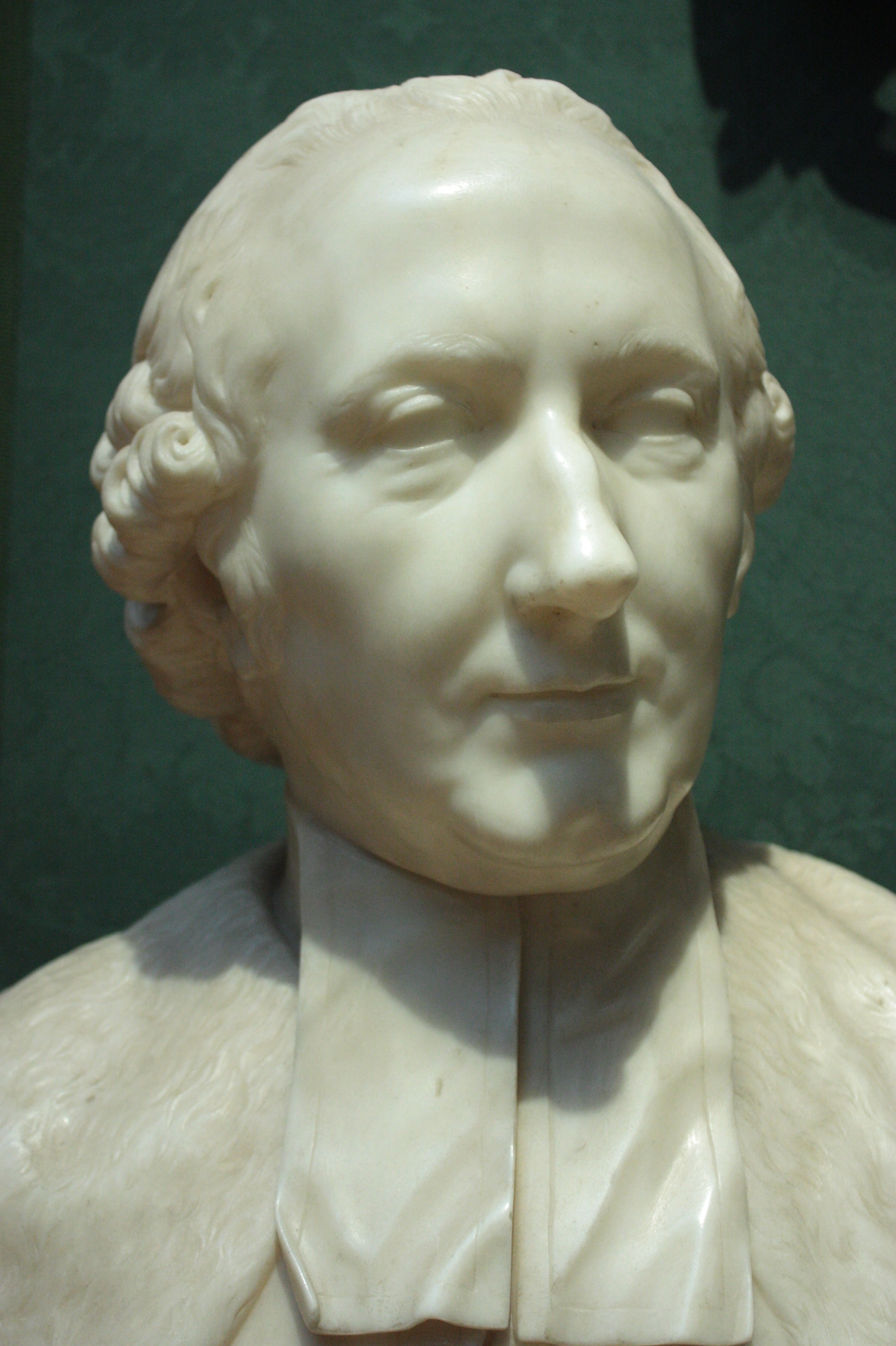
Bust by Christopher Hewetson

Hervey favoured absolute religious equality, and opposed the feudal system of tithes. Having again passed some time in Italy, he returned to Ireland and in 1782 threw himself ardently into the Irish Volunteer Movement, quickly attaining a prominent position among the volunteers. With much pomp, he arrived at an Irish nationalist convention held at Dublin in November 1783. Buoyed by his status and popularity Bishop Hervey let slip some scurrilous talk of rebellion which led the Dublin Castle administration to contemplate his arrest.

After this Hervey took no further part in British politics, spending his later years mainly on the continent of Europe. In 1798 he was imprisoned by the French at Milan for suspected espionage and was held in custody for eighteen months.

Upon his release, Hervey headed for Rome. En route at Albano, he needed overnight accommodation, which was offered by an Italian peasant by way of an outhouse; he and his wife were opposed to welcoming a Protestant into their house. The Lord Bishop died there outdoors at Albano. The earl's body was repatriated to England before being buried at Ickworth.

Elected a Fellow of the Royal Society in 1782, the following year Hervey received the Freedom of the City of Dublin as well as of Derry.

== Personality ==
Varying estimates have been found of his character. He was considered clever and cultured, but licentious and eccentric. He was a great collector of art and in later life, he openly professed materialistic opinions. Hervey fell in love with Wilhelmina, Countess von Lichtenau, King Frederick William II of Prussia's mistress, and by his bearing and often unusual and ostentatious style of dress he gave fresh point to Voltaire's original saying: "when God created the human race, he made men, women and Herveys".

During his European travels, and especially during his frequent visits to Rome, Hervey was known to walk around wearing a broad-brimmed white hat, many gold chains and red breeches, in what was perceived as a possible attempt to upstage his Catholic rivals.

As a bishop, Hervey was industrious and vigilant (despite his long absences from Ireland) albeit having once declared himself an agnostic. King George III, bemused by his behaviour, began referring to Bishop Hervey as "that wicked prelate"!

It is said that Hervey's knowledge of fine things in Europe and love of travelling and staying in luxury inspired the fashion for naming a hotel the Hotel Bristol. The use of this name is meant to be synonymous with the finest accommodation and living throughout the Continent; the implication being that if Hervey were in town, that is where he would stay.

== Family ==
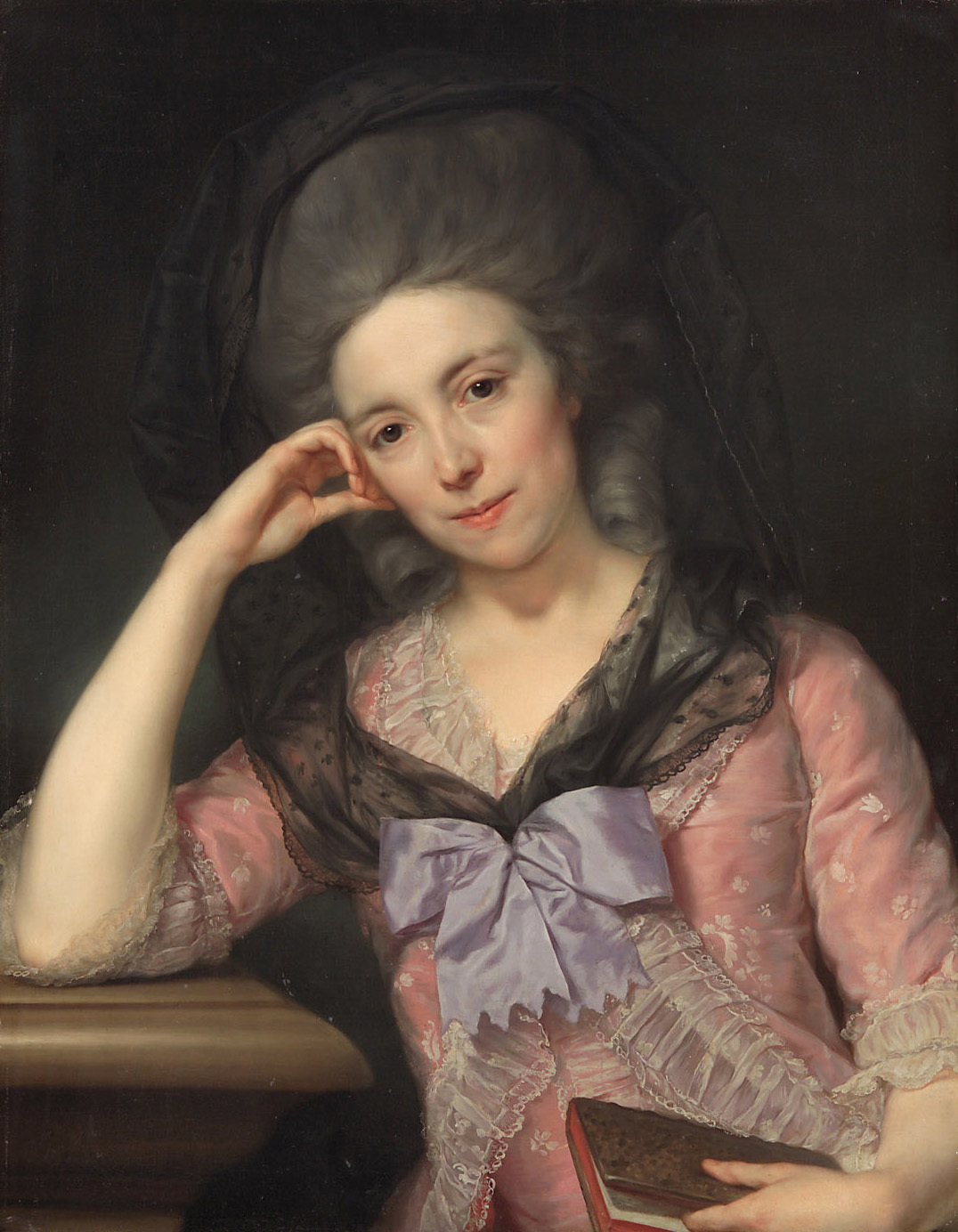
Elizabeth, Countess of Bristol. Portrait by Anton von Maron

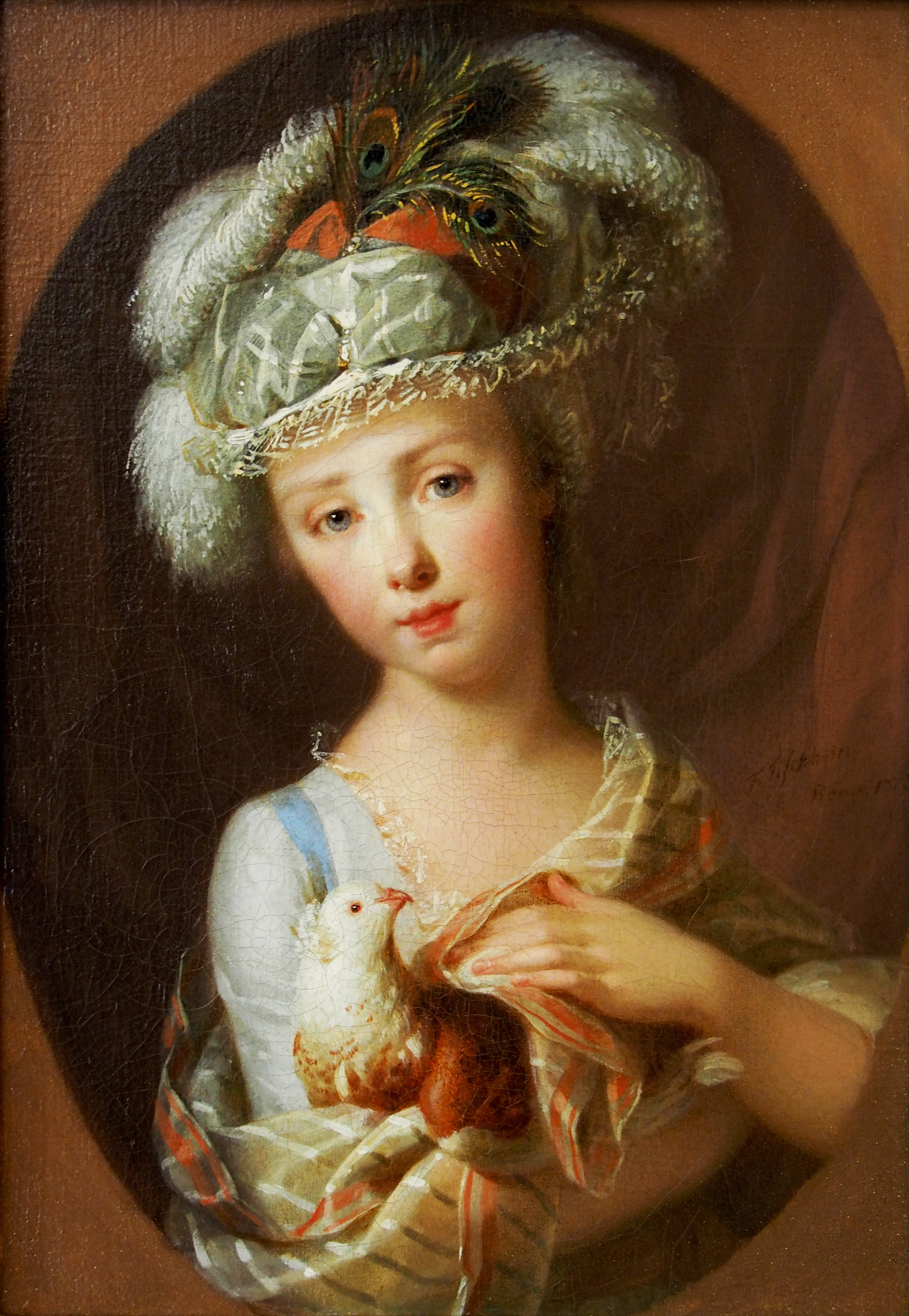
Lady Louisa Hervey, aged 11

The Hon. Frederick Hervey married, in 1752, Elizabeth Davers (1733–1800), daughter of Sir Jermyn Davers Bt MP, a great-granddaughter of Thomas, 2nd Baron Jermyn, as well as being sister and heiress of Sir Charles Davers Bt MP (1737–1807).

By their marriage, Hervey had four sons and three daughters:

- Lady Mary Caroline Hervey (1753–1842); married John Crichton, 1st Earl Erne, the couple later separated.
- George (1755–1765); died of illness aged nine, at Spa, Belgium, while the family was travelling.
- John "Jack" Augustus Hervey, Lord Hervey (1757–1796); Captain RN, married Elizabeth Drummond and predeceased his father, leaving issue one daughter (qv. Baron Seaford)
- Lady Elizabeth Christiana Hervey (1758–1824); married firstly John Thomas Foster, an Irish politician; after separation from her first husband became longtime mistress and later second wife of William Cavendish, 5th Duke of Devonshire KG.
- Short-lived son (b. and d. 1761)
- Lady Louisa Theodosia Hervey (1767–1821); married Robert Jenkinson, 2nd Earl of Liverpool KG and Prime Minister, 1812–1827.
- Frederick Hervey, 1st Marquess of Bristol (1769–1859); styled by courtesy Lord Hervey after 1796.

In 1782, after 30 years of marriage, Hervey and his wife separated. The two never saw each other again, although Hervey regularly corresponded with his children, including the youngest daughter Louisa, who lived with her mother.

When Hervey died in 1803 in Lazio, Italy, his son Frederick succeeded as 5th Earl of Bristol as well as to the family estates including Ickworth House. The title of Baron Howard de Walden however passed to his great-grandson Charles Ellis, son of the 1st Baron Seaford, son of The Hon. Elizabeth Hervey (only child of Jack, Lord Hervey).

== See also ==
- Ickworth House
- Marquess of Bristol
- Hotel Bristol

== Notes ==
- Harriet Bridgeman & Elizabeth Drury eds., The British Eccentric, Michael Joseph, London, 1975.
- Caroline Chapman & Jane Dormer, Elizabeth and Georgiana, John Wiley & Sons Inc., 2002.
- Brian Fothergill, The Mitred Earl: Frederick Hervey, Earl of Bristol and Bishop of Derry: An Eighteenth-Century Eccentric, Faber & Faber, London, 1974.
- Gash, Norman (1984). Lord Liverpool: The Life and Political Career of Robert Banks Jenkinson, Second Earl of Liverpool, 1770-1828. Weidenfeld and Nicolson, London. ISBN 9780674539105.
- Stephen Price, The Earl Bishop, Great Sea, Port Stewart, 2011.

Peerage of Great Britain
Preceded by Augustus Hervey	Earl of Bristol; 1779–1803	Succeeded by Frederick Hervey
Peerage of England
Preceded by John Whitwell	Baron Howard de Walden; 1799–1803	Succeeded by Charles Ellis
