= Sir Robert Davers, 1st Baronet =

English settler, planter and slave owner

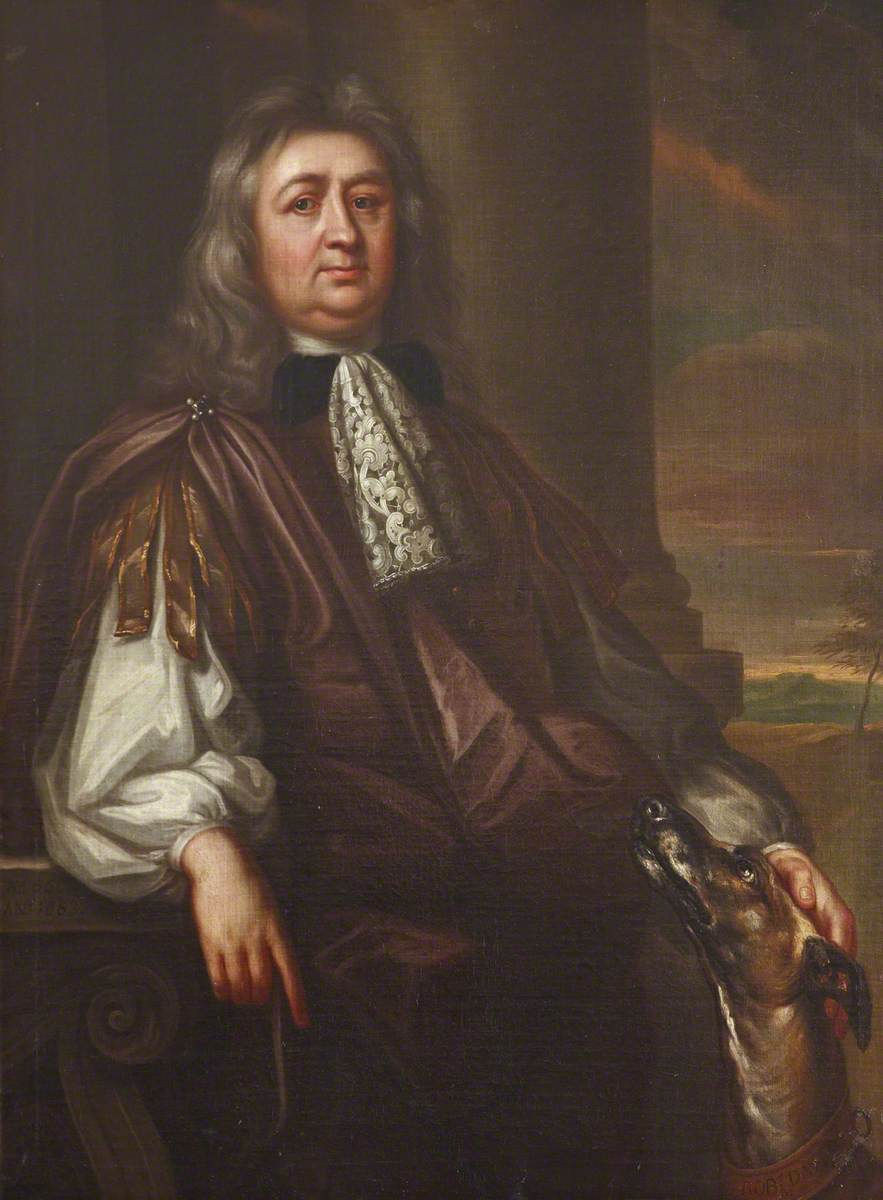
- A portrait Sir Robert Davers, 1st Baronet painted at the age 66 in 1683
- Born: c.1620
- Died: June 1684
- Buried: 21 June 1684; Rougham, Suffolk
- Spouse: Eleanor Luke (m.1653)
- Issue: Sir Robert Davers, 2nd Baronet
- Occupation: Settler, planter and slave owner

Sir Robert Davers, 1st Baronet (c.1620 – June 1684) was an English settler, plantation owner and slave owner in Barbados.

== Biography ==
Davers' parentage is unknown, but he was likely born in England in around 1620. He was likely the Robert Davers who is recorded as having sailed to the English colony of Barbados in April 1635, aged 14, with 78 other English settlers.

In 1654, he bought the plantations at Lower Estate and Moonshine Hall from William Byam. By 1673, he was the owner of 600 acres on the island, as well as at least 200 enslaved African people. He was among the most prominent plantation owners on Barbados, being the proprietor of extensive sugarcane fields in St George's Valley in the Saint George and Saint Philip parishes. This brought Davers great wealth, and in 1680 he returned to England to purchase the Rougham estate in Suffolk. On 12 May 1682, he was created a baronet, of Rougham in the Baronetage of England; one of numerous titles created by Charles II of England to recognise leaders in what was then England's richest colony in the Americas.

In 1653, he married Eleanor Luke, by whom he had one surviving son, his heir Sir Robert Davers, 2nd Baronet, and one surviving daughter. Davers was buried in Rougham on 21 June 1684. His will, dated 4–19 July 1679, left his plantations to his son, alongside leaving several named slaves to other members of his family, and giving two elderly slaves their freedom with food and housing for life. His portrait is in the collection at Ickworth House.

Baronetage of England
New creation	Baronet (of Rougham); 1682–1684	Succeeded by Robert Davers
