= Sir Jermyn Davers, 4th Baronet =

English landowner and Tory politician

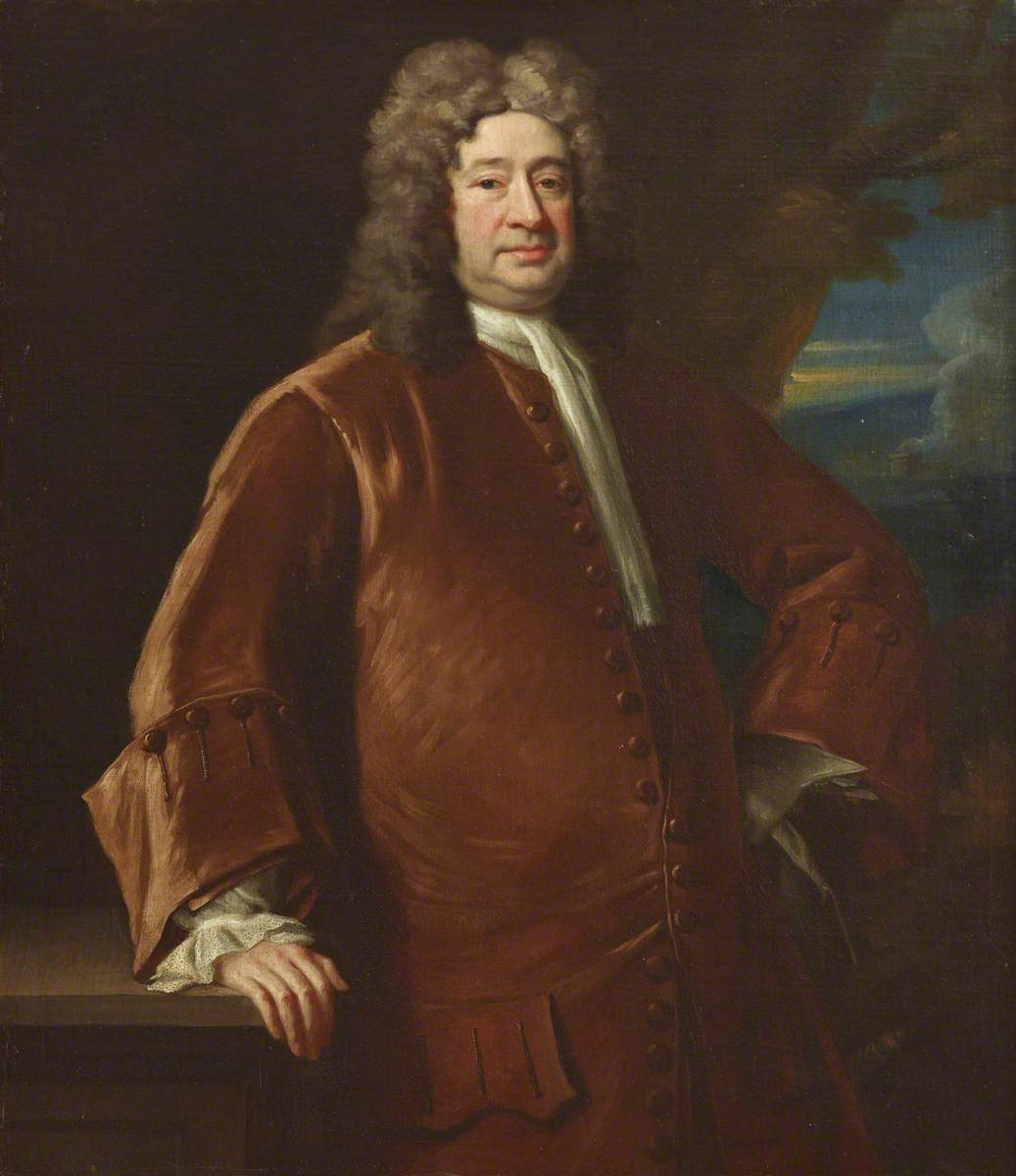
- A portrait Sir Jermyn Davers, circa 1740
- Born: c.1686
- Died: 20 February 1743
- Spouse: Margaretta Green (m.1729)
- Father: Sir Robert Davers, 2nd Baronet
- Mother: Hon. Mary Jermyn
- Occupation: Tory politician and landowner

Sir Jermyn Davers, 4th Baronet (c.1686 – 20 February 1743), of Rougham and Rushbrooke, Suffolk, was an English landowner and Tory politician who sat in the House of Commons from 1722 to 1743.

== Early life ==
Davers was the second son of Sir Robert Davers, 2nd Baronet and his wife, Hon. Mary Jermyn, daughter and co-heiress of Thomas Jermyn, 2nd Baron Jermyn, after whom he was named. He was brought up at Rushbrooke Hall and matriculated at Christ Church, Oxford on 14 March 1704, aged 17.

== Career ==
At the 1722 British general election, Davers was returned in a contest as a Tory Member of Parliament for Bury St Edmunds. He succeeded his brother Sir Robert Davers, 3rd Baronet, to the baronetcy on 20 May 1723. In April 1725, he was one of five Tories who voted against a motion to restore the inheritance of Viscount Bolingbroke. He inherited a considerable share of the Jermyn estates, including Cheveley Park, Cambridgeshire, and Dover Street, London, in 1726 from the widow of his great-uncle, Henry Jermyn, 1st Baron Dover; Lord Dover had died in 1708 without a male heir. At the 1727 British general election, he was returned as MP for Suffolk, topping the poll in a contest. He voted consistently against the government.

In 1730 he and his brother, Thomas, sold two estates – Lower Estate and Moonshine Hall (and the enslaved people attached to them) – on Barbados to the Frere family. He had inherited the holdings from his father. In 1732 he sold the Cheveley estate he had inherited from Lord Dover to the Duke of Somerset. He was returned unopposed for Suffolk in 1734 British general election and 1741 British general election. During the 1730s and 1740s, he was Hereditary High Steward of the Liberty of St Edmund. He was on the board of the Loyal Brotherhood, a London-based High Tory and semi-Jacobite political and social club.

== Later life and legacy ==
Davers appear to have had two illegitimate sons before his marriage to Margaretta Green, the daughter of Rev. Edward Green, rector of Drinkstone, Suffolk, on 21 October 1729. He died on 20 February 1743, leaving in addition four legitimate sons of whom two shot themselves, and two daughters:

- Mary Davers (1730–1805), unmarried
- Charles Davers (died young)
- Elizabeth Davers (1733 – 19 December 1800), married Frederick Hervey, 4th Earl of Bristol. Their son, Frederick Hervey, 1st Marquess of Bristol, later inherited a significant share of the Davers and Jermyn estates.
- Sir Robert Davers, 5th Baronet (1735 – 6 May 1763), unmarried
- Lt. Henry Davers, RN (d. 1759), shot himself on board HMS Neptune
- Sir Charles Davers, 6th Baronet (4 June 1737 – 4 June 1806), unmarried
- Rev. Thomas Davers (1738–1766)

He was succeeded in the baronetcy by his son Robert, who was killed in Canada during Pontiac's Rebellion, and then by Charles.

Parliament of Great Britain
Preceded by James Reynolds; Lord Hervey I	Member of Parliament for Bury St Edmunds; 1722–1727; With: James Reynolds 1722-1725; Lord Hervey II 1725-1727	Succeeded by Lord Hervey II; Thomas Norton
Preceded by Sir Thomas Hanmer, Bt; Sir William Barker, Bt	Member of Parliament for Suffolk; 1727–1743; With: Sir William Barker, Bt 1727-1732; Sir Robert Kemp, Bt 1732-1735; Sir Cordell Firebrace, Bt 1735-1743	Succeeded by John Affleck; Sir Cordell Firebrace, Bt
Baronetage of England
Preceded by Robert Davers	Baronet (of Rougham); 1723–1743	Succeeded by Robert Davers
