= Leicester Martin =

British Tory politician

Leicester Martin (c.1662 – 11 October 1732) was a British Tory politician.

== Biography ==
Martin was the son of Robert Martin of Worcestershire. He was educated at Balliol College, Oxford. By 1700 he had married Anne Devereux, daughter and heiress of Leicester Devereux, 6th Viscount Hereford, thereby coming into the possession of Christchurch Mansion in Suffolk. He served as High Sheriff of Suffolk in 1705–6.

In 1707 he was drafted by the Suffolk Tories to replace the Earl of Dysart as the Member of Parliament for Suffolk. He is not recorded as having made any contributions in parliament. He was classed as a Tory in two lists of 1708, but did not stand at the general election of that year, nor subsequently.

Martin died on 11 October 1732. His only daughter and heiress married Price Devereux, 10th Viscount Hereford and so returned Christchurch to the Devereux family.

Parliament of Great Britain
Preceded by Earl of Dysart; Sir Robert Davers, Bt	Member of Parliament for Suffolk; 1707–1708; With: Sir Robert Davers, Bt	Succeeded by Sir Thomas Hanmer, Bt; Sir Robert Davers, Bt
