= Frederick Hervey, 1st Marquess of Bristol =

British politician and military officer (1769–1859)

The Most Honourable The Marquess of Bristol
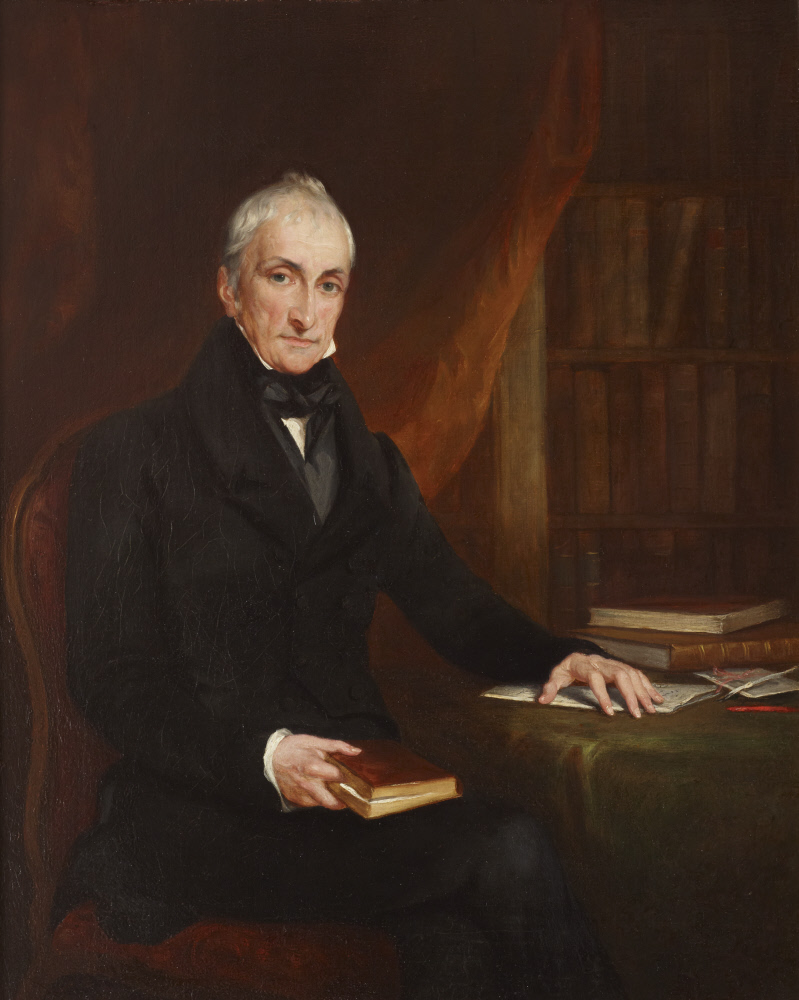
- Portrait by Francis Grant, 1845
- Born: 2 October 1769
- Died: 15 February 1859 (aged 89)
- Education: St John's College, Cambridge
- Occupations: Politician, military officer
- Spouse: Elizabeth Albana
- Children: Lady Augusta Hervey; Lady Georgiana Elizabeth Charlotte Hervey; Frederick Hervey, 2nd Marquess of Bristol; Major Lord George Hervey; Lord William Hervey; Rt. Rev. Lord Arthur Hervey; Rev. Lord Charles Amelius Hervey; Lord Alfred Hervey
- Parent(s): Frederick Hervey, 4th Earl of Bristol; Elizabeth Davers
- Relatives: Clotworthy Upton, 1st Baron Templetown (father-in-law); Louisa, Countess of Liverpool (sister and prime minister's wife)

Frederick William Hervey, 1st Marquess of Bristol (2 October 1769 – 15 February 1859), styled Lord Hervey between 1796 and 1803 and known as The Earl of Bristol between 1803 and 1826, was a British politician and military officer.

== Biography ==
=== Early life ===
Frederick William Hervey was born on 2 October 1769, the son of Frederick Hervey, 4th Earl of Bristol and Bishop of Derry, and his wife, Elizabeth, daughter of Sir Jermyn Davers, 4th Baronet. He was the younger son but, as his elder brother John Hervey died without male issue during their father's lifetime, he succeeded to the title on the father's death in 1803. He also had three sisters, Lady Mary Erne, Countess Erne, Elizabeth Cavendish, Duchess of Devonshire and Louisa Jenkinson, Countess of Liverpool.

=== Adult life ===
Hervey was admitted to St John's College, Cambridge, in 1786. He was elected a Fellow of the Royal Society in 1805.

Hervey served as an ensign in the 1st Regiment of Foot Guards from 1788 to 1793, and in 1798 was captain in a volunteer infantry regiment at Bury St Edmunds and Major-commandant of the Ickworth yeomanry which were both raised during the French Revolutionary War. Hervey was a member of Parliament for Bury St Edmunds 1796–1803.

In 1806 he inherited the estates of his uncle, Sir Charles Davers, 6th Baronet, including Rushbrooke Hall.

In 1826, he was created Marquess of Bristol and Earl Jermyn. He was succeeded by his son Frederick William (1800–1864), M.P. for Bury St Edmunds 1830–1859, as 2nd marquess.

=== Personal life ===
Hervey married Elizabeth Albana (1775–1844), daughter of Clotworthy Upton, 1st Baron Templetown and Elizabeth Upton, Baroness Templetown, by whom he had three daughters and six sons:

- Lady Augusta Hervey (29 December 1798 – 17 March 1880) married Frederick Charles William Seymour, son of Adm. Lord Hugh Seymour, and had six children.
- Frederick Hervey, 2nd Marquess of Bristol (15 July 1800 – 30 October 1864), the great-great-great-grandfather of the present Marquess
- Lady Georgiana Elizabeth Charlotte Hervey (8 September 1801 – 16 January 1869) married Rev. Hon. John Grey, son of Charles Grey, 2nd Earl Grey, and had three children.
- Major Lord George Hervey (25 January 1803 – 3 February 1838)
- Lord William Hervey (27 September 1805 – 6 May 1850), the great-great-grandfather of the current second in line to the marquessate
- Rt. Rev. Lord Arthur Charles Hervey (20 August 1808 – 9 June 1894), Bishop of Bath and Wells
- Lady Sophia Elizabeth Caroline Hervey (26 April 1811 – 1 October 1863)
- Rev. Lord Charles Amelius Hervey (1 November 1814 – 11 April 1880), cricketer and clergyman
- Lord Alfred Hervey MP (25 June 1816 – 15 April 1875)

=== Death ===
He died on 15 February 1859 from gout. He had given the land for the Woodvale Cemetery at Brighton, where he was originally buried in the cruciform Gothic Revival tomb which still bears his name, but his body was later taken to St Mary's Church, Ickworth—the church closest to Ickworth House, where the Marquesses are traditionally buried. Cremated remains are now stored in the gable-topped mausoleum. It stands near the eponymous Bristol Ground, originally a pauper burial area within the Extra Mural Cemetery but now part of the Woodvale grounds: it has become a memorial garden attached to Woodvale crematorium.

Parliament of Great Britain
Preceded by Sir Charles Davers, Bt; Lord Charles FitzRoy	Member of Parliament for Bury St Edmunds; 1796–1800; With: Sir Charles Davers, Bt 1796–1800	Succeeded by Parliament of the United Kingdom
Parliament of the United Kingdom
Preceded by Parliament of Great Britain	Member of Parliament for Bury St Edmunds; 1801–1803; With: Sir Charles Davers, Bt 1801–1802; Lord Charles FitzRoy 1802–1803	Succeeded by Lord Charles FitzRoy; The Lord Templetown
Political offices
Preceded by Edward Fisher	Under-Secretary of State for Foreign Affairs; 1801–1803	Succeeded by Charles Arbuthnot
Peerage of the United Kingdom
New creation	Marquess of Bristol; 1826–1859	Succeeded by Frederick William Hervey
Peerage of Great Britain
Preceded by Frederick Augustus Hervey	Earl of Bristol; 1803–1859	Succeeded by Frederick William Hervey
