= Sir Robert Davers, 5th Baronet =

British explorer killed in Pontiac's Rebellion

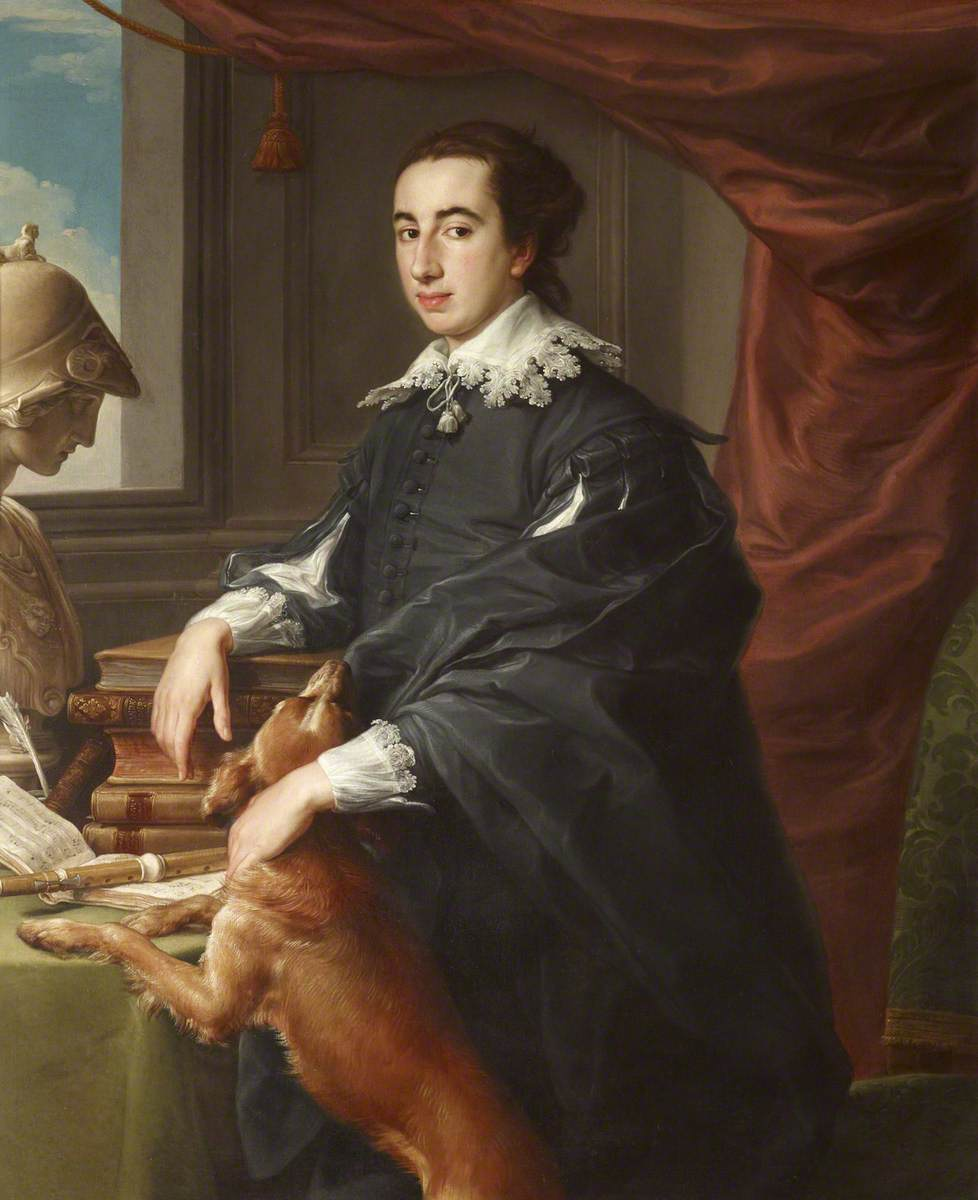
- Portrait of Sir Robert Davers by Pompeo Batoni
- Born: 1729; Rushbrooke Hall, Suffolk, England
- Died: 6 May 1763 (aged 33–34); St. Clair River, North America
- Known for: Explorer

Sir Robert Davers, 5th Baronet (1729 – 6 May 1763) was a British baronet and explorer. He was killed during Pontiac's Rebellion while on a surveying expedition of the St. Clair River.

== Biography ==
Davers was born at Rushbrooke Hall, Suffolk, the eldest surviving son of Sir Jermyn Davers, 4th Baronet and Margaretta Green. Upon the death of his father in February 1742, Davers inherited his baronetcy. The following July he entered King Edward VI School, Bury St Edmunds. In 1756 he undertook the Grand Tour in Europe and was painted by Pompeo Batoni in Rome. In around 1760 he completed his studies in Lausanne.

In 1761 he travelled to North America to tour the Great Lakes, leasing his estate in Suffolk. By September 1761, Davers had introduced himself to Major General Jeffery Amherst in New York City. He was tasked to carry dispatches from Amherst to Detroit, arriving on 1 December 1761. He spent the winter there studying the language and culture of the neighbouring Native Americans.

In April 1762, Davers began exploring the Great Lakes in a small canoe with either his Pawnee slave boy or a small group of colonists. By June he was at Sault Ste. Marie, Ontario having completed a journey across Lake Superior. There he met Alexander Henry the elder and travelled with him to Fort Michilimackinac. Davers had returned to Detroit by 23 September 1762. He subsequently prepared a petition to the Privy Council of Great Britain for a grant of land on Grosse Isle and several neighbouring islands.

=== Death in Pontiac's War ===
In May 1763, he accompanied Lieutenant Charles Robertson and 6 to 8 others on a surveying expedition to determine the navigability of the St. Clair River. Despite being warned by French settlers of hostile Native Americans in the area, the group proceeded and were ambushed by Pontiac's warriors in an early event in Pontiac's War. Davers was killed in the attack. Reports from the time indicated that Davers body may have been boiled and eaten. It was later determined that although Davers’ body was mutilated, he was given a proper burial near an Ojibwa village. Davers had never married and was succeeded in his title by his younger brother, Charles Davers.

Baronetage of England
Preceded by Jermyn Davers	Baronet (of Rougham); 1743–1763	Succeeded by Charles Davers
