= Carr Hervey, Lord Hervey =

MP for Bury St Edmunds from 1713 to 1722

Carr Hervey (1691–1723), styled Lord Hervey after his father was created Earl of Bristol in 1714, was one of the two MPs for Bury St Edmunds between 1713 and 1722.
