= Sir Robert Davers, 2nd Baronet =

British politician and landowner

Sir Sir Robert Davers Bt
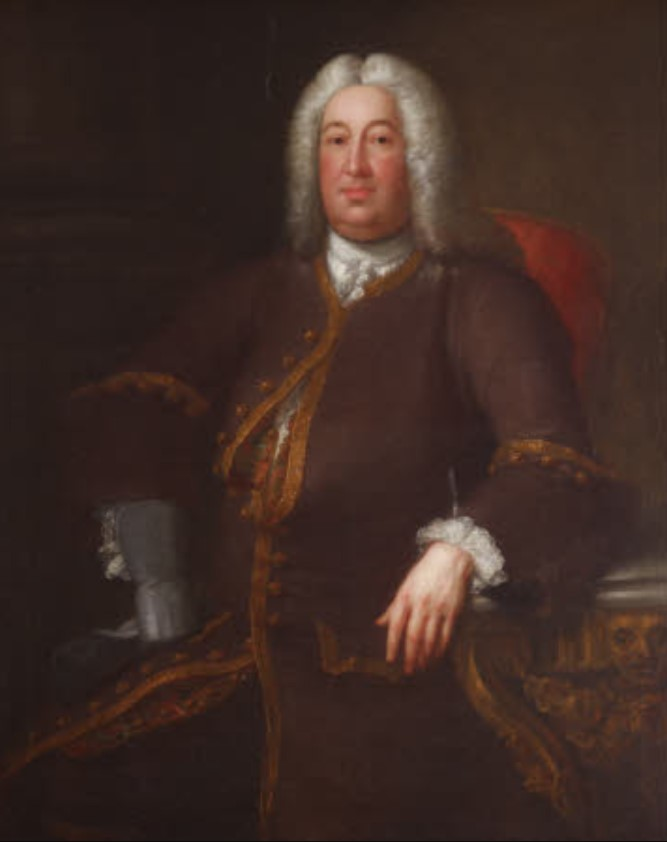
- Sir Robert Davers, 2nd Baronet by Jonathan Richardson, c.1700
- Born: c. 1653; Barbados
- Died: 1 October 1722; Rushbrooke Hall, Suffolk
- Occupations: Politician, landowner
- Parents: Sir Robert Davers, 1st Baronet (father); Eleanor Davers (mother)

Sir Robert Davers, 2nd Baronet (c. 1653 – 1 October 1722) was a British Tory politician and landowner.

== Early life in Barbados ==
Robert Davers was born c. 1653 in the English colony of Barbados. He was the only surviving son of Sir Robert Davers, 1st Baronet and his wife Eleanor. His father was a Royalist who emigrated to Barbados, a Royalist stronghold, and acquired ownership over a slave plantation. He owned 300 acres of land which was worked by 200 Black slaves. Davers was born in Barbados before coming to England between 1680 and 1682. He then returned to Barbados and took his seat in the Council there on 13 June 1682. On 30 November 1683 he was one of the Barons of the Court of Exchequer and of Pleas of Barbados. He inherited his father's baronetcy in 1684 and was chosen to serve as High Sheriff of Suffolk for 1685, but did not take up the role. Davers also inherited his father's plantation and slaves, and repeatedly defended the Atlantic slave trade in England despite never engaging in the trade himself.

== Political career ==
He moved back permanently to England in 1687. In 1688, his wife's uncle, Lord Dover selected Davers as the court candidate for Bury St Edmunds. Davers, however, rejected the offer to stand for election at this stage and it soon became apparent to the supporters of James II of England that he would oppose repeal of the Test Acts if elected.

In 1689, Davers defeated John Hervey to be elected as the Member of Parliament for Bury St Edmunds on the Tory interest. In the following Convention Parliament, Davers voted with the Jacobite efforts to declare that throne was not vacant following the flight of James II to France. At parliament he was appointed to 35 committees. His only recorded speech was in opposition to increasing supplies for the English effort in the Nine Years' War. After 1690, he became a friend and political ally of Robert Harley and subsequently usually voted with the Tories. Between 1691 and 1714 he was a Gentleman of the Privy Chamber to William III and Anne, Queen of Great Britain. Despite being a signatory of the Association of 1696, he was a member of the Tory October Club.

In 1700 he was appointed a justice of the peace for Suffolk. He represented Bury for a second term from 1703 to 1705, after which he was elected MP for Suffolk, holding that seat until his death in 1722. In 1721, his name was included on a list of leading politicians and likely Jacobite sympathisers sent to James Francis Edward Stuart.

== Personal life ==
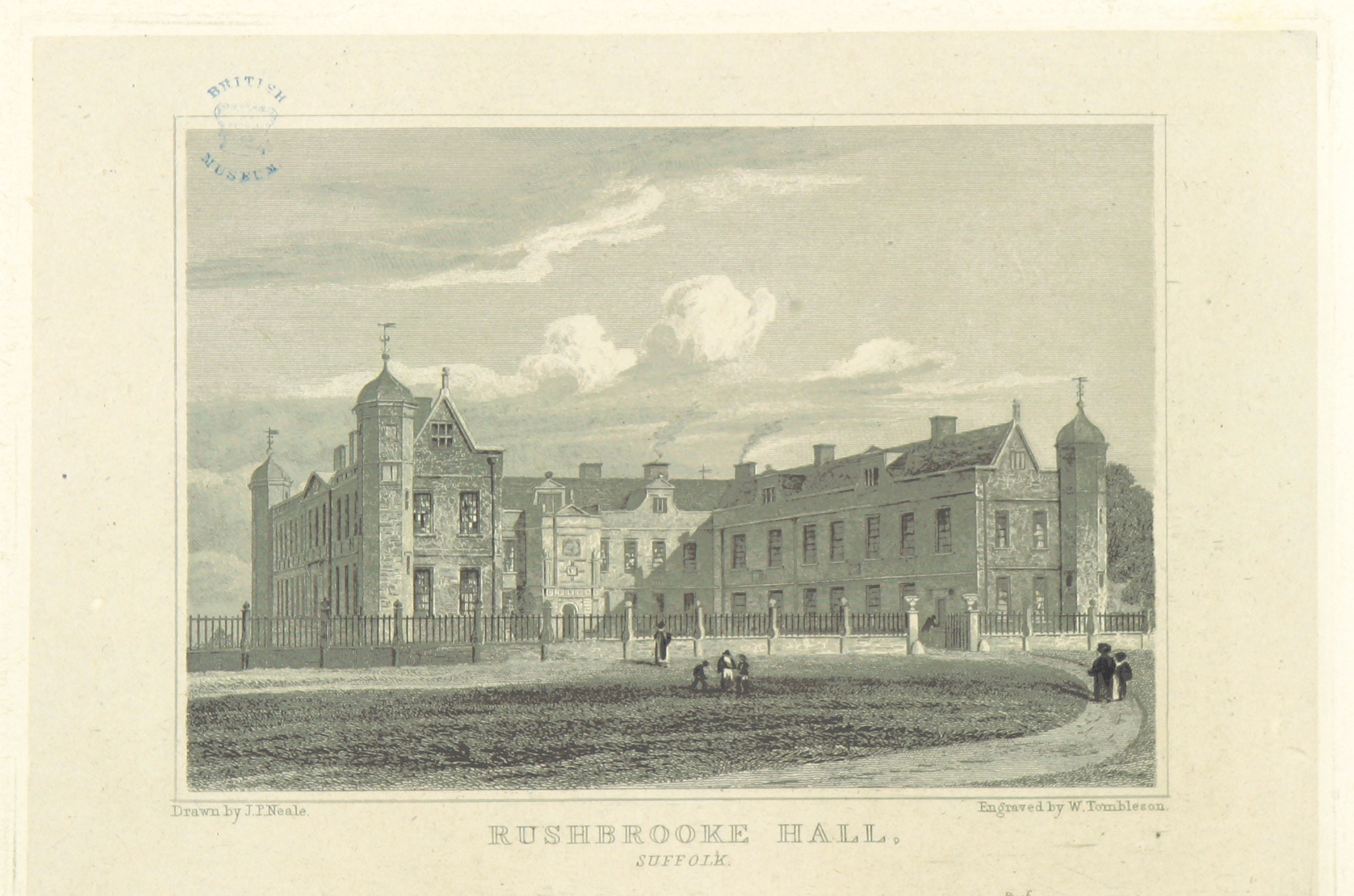
Rushbrooke Hall as drawn in 1818.

Davers married Hon. Mary Jermyn, daughter and co-heiress of Thomas Jermyn, 2nd Baron Jermyn, on 2 February 1682. They had five sons and five daughters. By this marriage he acquired in 1703 one-fifth of the Rushbrooke Hall estate, of which he purchased the other parts from his sister-in-law, Hon. Merolina Jermyn, the wife of Sir Thomas Spring, 3rd Baronet. He sold the estate of Rougham between 1705 and 1710 to his son in law, Clement Corrance and made Rushbrooke the family's principle seat. Lady Davers died ten days after her husband in 1722. Davers was succeeded as baronet by his son, Robert.

Parliament of England
Preceded by Sir Thomas Hervey; William Crofts	Member of Parliament for Bury St Edmunds; 1689–1701; With: Sir Thomas Hervey to 1690; Henry Goldwell 1690–94; John Hervey from 1694	Succeeded by John Hervey; Sir Thomas Felton, Bt
Preceded by The Earl of Dysart; Sir Dudley Cullum, Bt	Member of Parliament for Suffolk; 1705–1707; With: The Earl of Dysart	Succeeded by Parliament of Great Britain
Parliament of Great Britain
Preceded by Parliament of England	Member of Parliament for Suffolk; 1707–1722; With: The Earl of Dysart to December 1707; Leicester Martin December 1707 – 1708; Sir Thomas Hanmer, Bt from 1708	Succeeded by Sir William Barker, Bt; Sir Thomas Hanmer, Bt
Baronetage of England
Preceded by Robert Davers	Baronet (of Rougham); 1685–1722	Succeeded by Robert Davers
