= Davers baronets =

Extinct baronetcy in the Baronetage of England

Escutcheon of the Davers baronets of Rougham

The Davers Baronetcy, of Rougham in the County of Suffolk, was a title in the Baronetage of England. It was created on 12 May 1682 for Robert Davers, who had made a great fortune in Barbados as a plantation owner before acquiring the Rougham estate in Suffolk. The second and fourth Baronets represented Bury St Edmunds and Suffolk in Parliament. The sixth Baronet sat as Member of Parliament for Weymouth and Bury St Edmunds. Despite having an alleged nine illegitimate children, the 6th Baronet left his estates to his nephew, Frederick Hervey, 1st Marquess of Bristol, and his baronetcy became extinct.

Thomas Davers, third son of the second Baronet, was an admiral in the Royal Navy. The family seat was Rushbrooke Hall from 1703 to 1806, which entered the family through the marriage of the second baronet to a daughter of Thomas Jermyn, 2nd Baron Jermyn.

== Davers baronets, of Rougham (1682) ==
- Sir Robert Davers, 1st Baronet (c. 1620–1685)
- Sir Robert Davers, 2nd Baronet (c. 1653–1722)
- Sir Robert Davers, 3rd Baronet (c. 1684–1723)
- Sir Jermyn Davers, 4th Baronet (c. 1686–1743)
- Sir Robert Davers, 5th Baronet (c. 1730– 6 May 1763) (killed in Pontiac's Rebellion)
- Sir Charles Davers, 6th Baronet (1737–1806)
