= Earl of Bristol =

Earldom in the Peerage of Great Britain

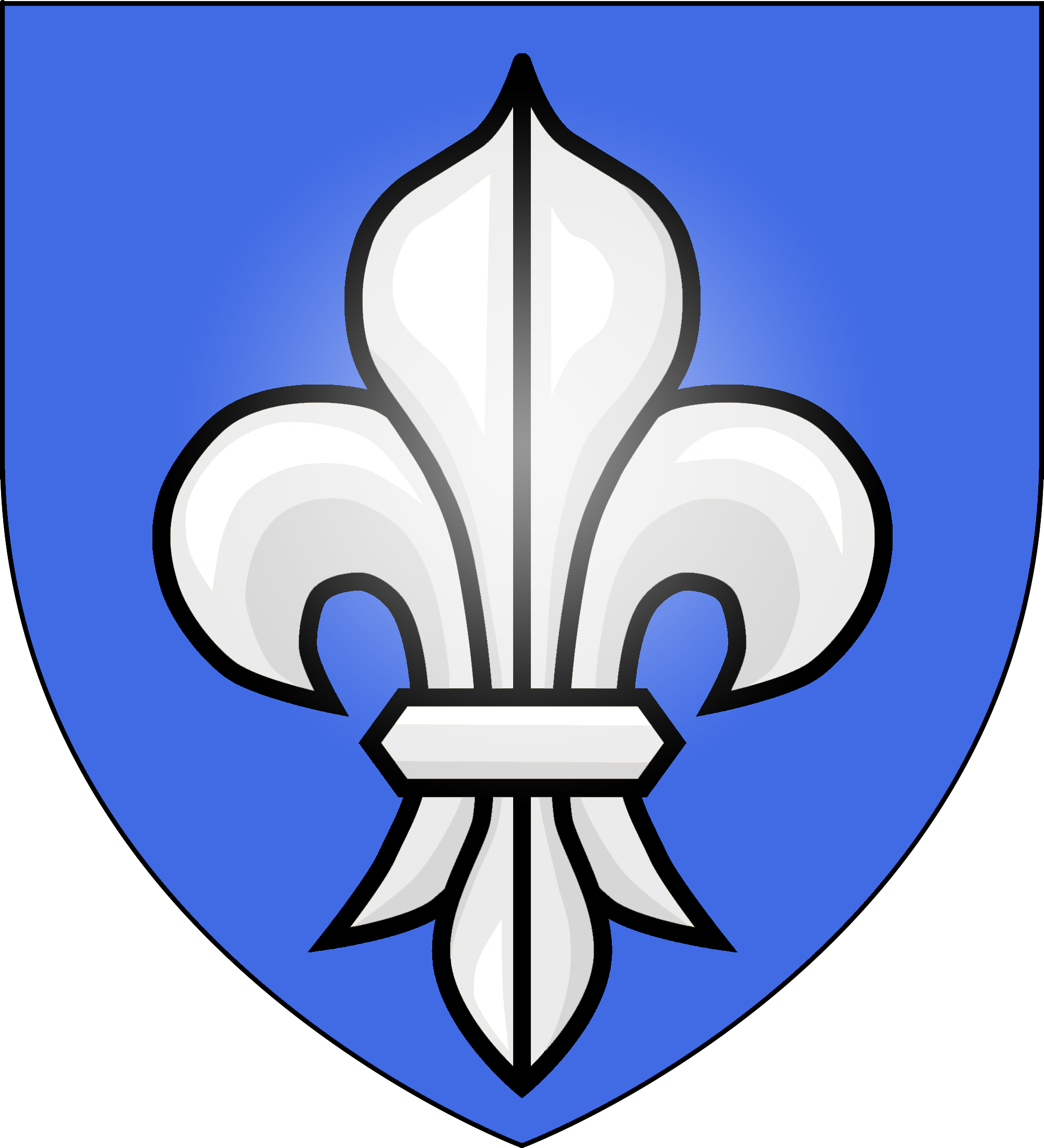
Arms of Digby, Earl of Bristol: Azure, a fleur-de-lys argent

Arms of Hervey, Earl of Bristol: Gules, on a bend argent three trefoils slipped vert

Earl of Bristol is a title that has been created twice in British history, and was attested once before. Antiquaries Carew and Williams refer to Reginald de Dunstanville (c. 1110–1175, the illegitimate son of King Henry I) as Earl of Bristol. However, the first confirmed creation came in the Peerage of England in 1622 in favour of the politician and diplomat John Digby who served for many years as Ambassador to Spain, and had already been created Baron Digby of Sherborne, in the County of Dorset, in 1618, also in the Peerage of England. Digby was the brother of Sir Robert Digby of Coleshill, Warwickshire, whose son Robert Digby became 1st Baron Digby of Geashill in the Peerage of Ireland in 1620. (See the article Baron Digby for more information on this other branch of the family).

He was succeeded by his son, the second Earl. He was a prominent statesman and served as Secretary of State for King Charles I. In 1641 he was summoned to the House of Lords through a writ of acceleration in his father's junior title of Baron Digby of Sherborne. When he died the titles passed to his son, the third Earl. He sat as Member of Parliament for Dorset and served as Lord-Lieutenant of Dorset. He was childless and the titles became extinct on his death in 1698.

The second creation of the earldom came in the Peerage of Great Britain in 1714 for John Hervey. For more information on this creation, see Marquess of Bristol.

== Earl of Bristol ==
- Reginald de Dunstanville (c. 1110–1175)

== Earls of Bristol, first creation (1622) ==
- John Digby, 1st Earl of Bristol (1586–1653)
- George Digby, 2nd Earl of Bristol (1612–1677)
- John Digby, 3rd Earl of Bristol (c. 1635–1698)

== Earls of Bristol, second creation (1714) ==
- see the Marquess of Bristol

Family tree of the Barons Hervey, Earls of Bristol, and Marquesses of Bristol, Earl of St Albans and Barons Jermyn

William Hervey d. 1538
John Hervey d. 1556	Nicholas Hervey lifespan unknown
William Hervey d. 1592	Henry Hervey lifespan unknown	Jane Thomas lifespan unknown
Baronet Hervey, of St. Martin's in the Fields, co. Middlesex, 1619; Baron Hervey of Rosse, co. Wexford, 1620; Baron Hervey of Kidbrooke, co. Kent, 1627/1628
John Hervey d. 1630	Robert Jermyn; 1539–1614	William Hervey d. 1642; 1st Baron Hervey of Rosse and of Kidbrooke, and Baronet Hervey
Baron Hervey of Ross and of Kidbrooke and Baronet Hervey extinct, 1642
William Hervey d. 1660	Thomas Jermyn; 1573–1645
Baron Jermyn of St Edmundsbury, 1643; Earl of St Albans, 1660
Thomas Hervey; 1625–1694	Susan	Thomas Jermyn; 1604–1659	Henry Jermyn; 1605–1684; 1st Earl of St Albans and Baron Jermyn
Earldom of St Albans extinct, 1684
Baron Hervey of Ickworth, 1703; Earl of Bristol, 1714	Baron Dover, 1685
John Hervey; 1665–1751; 1st Earl of Bristol and Baron Hervey	Thomas Jermyn; 1633–1703; 2nd Baron Jermyn	Henry Jermyn c. 1636–1708; 1st Baron Dover, 3rd Baron Jermyn
Baronies Dover and Jermyn extinct, 1708
Carr Hervey; 1691–1723 styled Lord Hervey	John Hervey; 1696–1743; 2nd Baron Hervey
George William Hervey; 1721–1775; 2nd Earl of Bristol and Baron Hervey	Augustus John Hervey; 1724–1779; 3rd Earl of Bristol and Baron Hervey	Frederick Augustus Hervey; 1730–1803; 4th Earl of Bristol and Baron Hervey
Marquess of Bristol and Earl Jermyn, 1826
Augustus Hervey b. 1747	George Hervey; 1755–c. 1764	John Augustus Hervey; 1757–1796 styled Lord Hervey	Frederick William Hervey; 1769–1859; 1st Marquess of Bristol and Earl Jermyn; 5th Earl of Bristol and Baron Hervey
Frederick William Hervey; 1800–1864; 2nd Marquess of Bristol and Earl Jermyn; 6th Earl of Bristol and Baron Hervey
Frederick William John Hervey; 1834–1907; 3rd Marquess of Bristol and Earl Jermyn; 7th Earl of Bristol and Baron Hervey	Augustus Henry Charles Hervey; 1837–1875
Capt. Charles Hervey; 1862–1893	Frederick William Fane Hervey; 1863–1951; 4th Marquess of Bristol and Earl Jermyn; 8th Earl of Bristol and Baron Hervey	Walter Hervey; 1865–1948 styled Lord Hervey (Note: The younger brothers of the 4th Marquess were allowed by a warrant of precedence from the King to "have, hold and enjoy the title, rank, place, pre-eminence and precedence as the sons [...] of a Marquess", because their father would have held the marquessate but for his predeceasing the previous holder.)	Rev. Manners Hervey; 1866–1944 styled Lord Hervey	Herbert Arthur Robert Hervey; 1870–1960; 5th Marquess of Bristol and Earl Jermyn; 9th Earl of Bristol and Baron Hervey
Victor Frederick Cochrane Hervey; 1915–1985; 6th Marquess of Bristol and Earl Jermyn; 10th Earl of Bristol and Baron Hervey
Frederick William John Augustus Hervey; 1954–1999; 7th Marquess of Bristol and Earl Jermyn; 11th Earl of Bristol and Baron Hervey	Frederick William Charles Nicholas Wentworth Hervey; 1961–1998	Frederick William Augustus Hervey b. 1979; 8th Marquess of Bristol and Earl Jermyn; 12th Earl of Bristol and Baron Hervey
Frederick Hervey b. 2022 styled Earl Jermyn
