= Baron Hervey =

Barony in the Peerage of England

Baron Hervey is an aristocratic title that has been created three times, once in the Peerage of Ireland and twice in the Peerage of England.

The first creation was in the Peerage of Ireland in 1620, when Sir William Hervey, 1st Baronet, was made Baron Hervey, of Rosse in County Wexford. He had been created Baronet of St. Martin's in the Fields on 31 May 1619.

The second creation was in 1628, when the same William Hervey was also made Baron Hervey, of Kidbrooke, Kent, in the Peerage of England. When William Hervey died in 1642, both titles became extinct.

The third creation came in 1703 in the Peerage of England, when John Hervey was made Baron Hervey, of Ickworth, Suffolk. John Hervey was a second cousin thrice removed of William Hervey and was later created Earl of Bristol.

== Baron Hervey (1620, 1628) ==
- William Hervey, 1st Baron Hervey (died 1642)

== Barons Hervey (1703) ==
- See Marquess of Bristol

== Family tree ==
Family tree of the Barons Hervey, Earls of Bristol, and Marquesses of Bristol, Earl of St Albans and Barons Jermyn

William Hervey d. 1538
John Hervey d. 1556 | Nicholas Hervey lifespan unknown
William Hervey d. 1592 | Henry Hervey lifespan unknown | Jane Thomas lifespan unknown
Baronet Hervey, of St. Martin's in the Fields, co. Middlesex, 1619; Baron Hervey of Rosse, co. Wexford, 1620; Baron Hervey of Kidbrooke, co. Kent, 1627/1628
John Hervey d. 1630 | Robert Jermyn; 1539–1614 | William Hervey d. 1642; 1st Baron Hervey of Rosse and of Kidbrooke, and Baronet Hervey
Baron Hervey of Ross and of Kidbrooke and Baronet Hervey extinct, 1642
William Hervey d. 1660 | Thomas Jermyn; 1573–1645
Baron Jermyn of St Edmundsbury, 1643; Earl of St Albans, 1660
Thomas Hervey; 1625–1694 | Susan | Thomas Jermyn; 1604–1659 | Henry Jermyn; 1605–1684; 1st Earl of St Albans and Baron Jermyn
Earldom of St Albans extinct, 1684
Baron Hervey of Ickworth, 1703; Earl of Bristol, 1714 | Baron Dover, 1685
John Hervey; 1665–1751; 1st Earl of Bristol and Baron Hervey | Thomas Jermyn; 1633–1703; 2nd Baron Jermyn | Henry Jermyn c. 1636–1708; 1st Baron Dover, 3rd Baron Jermyn
Baronies Dover and Jermyn extinct, 1708
Carr Hervey; 1691–1723 styled Lord Hervey | John Hervey; 1696–1743; 2nd Baron Hervey
George William Hervey; 1721–1775; 2nd Earl of Bristol and Baron Hervey | Augustus John Hervey; 1724–1779; 3rd Earl of Bristol and Baron Hervey | Frederick Augustus Hervey; 1730–1803; 4th Earl of Bristol and Baron Hervey
Marquess of Bristol and Earl Jermyn, 1826
Augustus Hervey b. 1747 | George Hervey; 1755–c. 1764 | John Augustus Hervey; 1757–1796 styled Lord Hervey | Frederick William Hervey; 1769–1859; 1st Marquess of Bristol and Earl Jermyn; 5th Earl of Bristol and Baron Hervey
Frederick William Hervey; 1800–1864; 2nd Marquess of Bristol and Earl Jermyn; 6th Earl of Bristol and Baron Hervey
Frederick William John Hervey; 1834–1907; 3rd Marquess of Bristol and Earl Jermyn; 7th Earl of Bristol and Baron Hervey | Augustus Henry Charles Hervey; 1837–1875
Capt. Charles Hervey; 1862–1893 | Frederick William Fane Hervey; 1863–1951; 4th Marquess of Bristol and Earl Jermyn; 8th Earl of Bristol and Baron Hervey | Walter Hervey; 1865–1948 styled Lord Hervey (Note: The younger brothers of the 4th Marquess were allowed by a warrant of precedence from the King to "have, hold and enjoy the title, rank, place, pre-eminence and precedence as the sons [...] of a Marquess", because their father would have held the marquessate but for his predeceasing the previous holder.) | Rev. Manners Hervey; 1866–1944 styled Lord Hervey | Herbert Arthur Robert Hervey; 1870–1960; 5th Marquess of Bristol and Earl Jermyn; 9th Earl of Bristol and Baron Hervey
Victor Frederick Cochrane Hervey; 1915–1985; 6th Marquess of Bristol and Earl Jermyn; 10th Earl of Bristol and Baron Hervey
Frederick William John Augustus Hervey; 1954–1999; 7th Marquess of Bristol and Earl Jermyn; 11th Earl of Bristol and Baron Hervey | Frederick William Charles Nicholas Wentworth Hervey; 1961–1998 | Frederick William Augustus Hervey b. 1979; 8th Marquess of Bristol and Earl Jermyn; 12th Earl of Bristol and Baron Hervey
Frederick Hervey b. 2022 styled Earl Jermyn
