= Baron Dover =

Barony in the Peerage of Great Britain

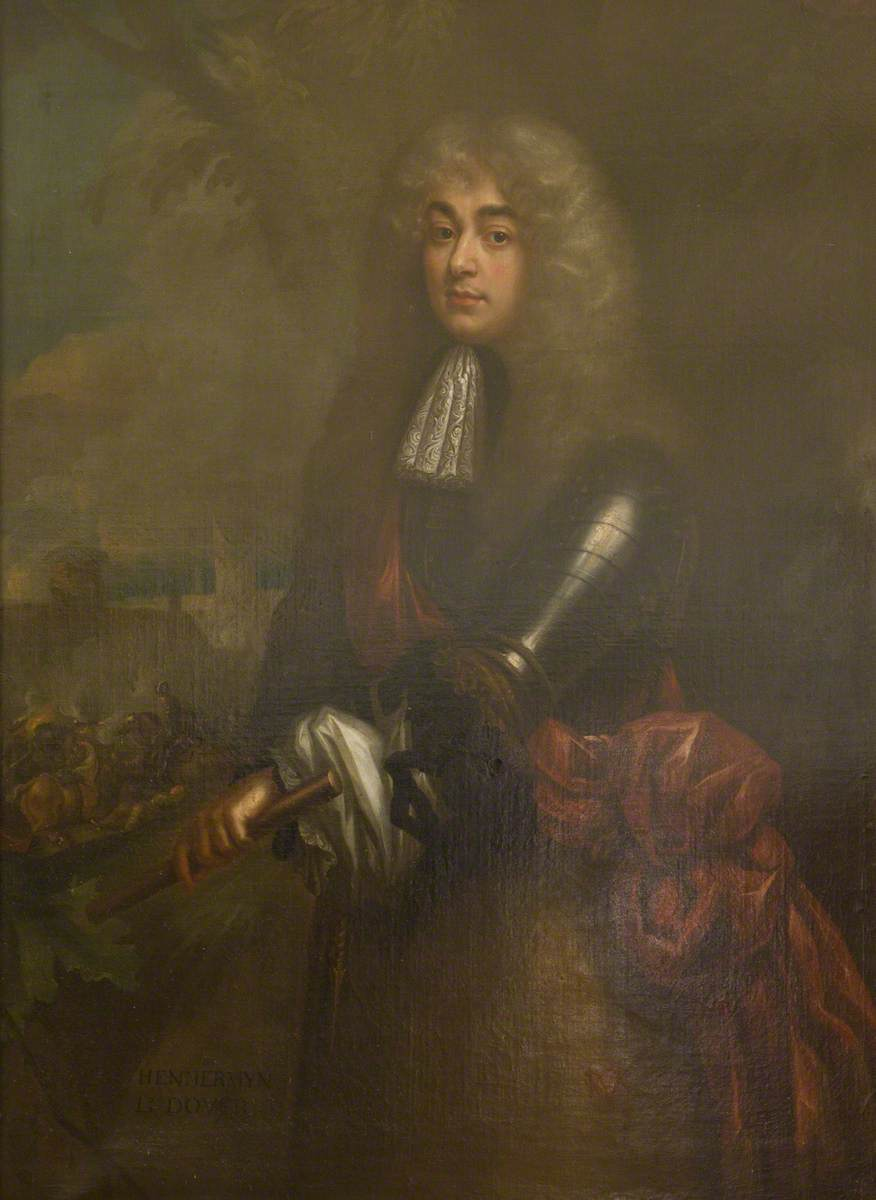
Henry Jermyn, first Baron Dover of the 1685 creation

Baron Dover is a title that has been created three times, once in the Peerage of England, once in the Peerage of Great Britain and once in the Peerage of the United Kingdom. All three creations are now extinct.

The first creation came in the Peerage of England in 1685 when Henry Jermyn was made Baron Dover. In 1703 he also succeeded his elder brother as Baron Jermyn. For more information on this creation, see the latter title.

The second creation came in the Peerage of Great Britain in 1788 when then soldier General Sir Joseph Yorke was made Lord Dover, Baron of the Town and Port of Dover, in the County of Kent. He was the third son of Philip Yorke, 1st Earl of Hardwicke. The peerage became extinct on Lord Dover's death in 1792.

The third creation came in the Peerage of the United Kingdom in 1831 when the politician George Agar-Ellis was created Baron Dover, of Dover in the County of Kent. He was the only son of Henry Ellis, 2nd Viscount Clifden. For more information on this creation, see Viscount Clifden.

== Barons Dover (1685) ==
- see Baron Jermyn

Family tree of the Barons Hervey, Earls of Bristol, and Marquesses of Bristol, Earl of St Albans (2nd creation) and Barons Jermyn

William Hervey d. 1538
John Hervey d. 1556	Nicholas Hervey lifespan unknown
William Hervey d. 1592	Henry Hervey lifespan unknown	Jane Thomas lifespan unknown
Baronet Hervey, of St. Martin's in the Fields, co. Middlesex, 1619; Baron Hervey of Rosse, co. Wexford, 1620; Baron Hervey of Kidbrooke, co. Kent, 1627/1628
John Hervey d. 1630	Robert Jermyn; 1539–1614	William Hervey d. 1642; 1st Baron Hervey of Rosse and of Kidbrooke, and Baronet Hervey
Baron Hervey of Ross and of Kidbrooke and Baronet Hervey extinct, 1642
William Hervey d. 1660	Thomas Jermyn; 1573–1645
Baron Jermyn of St Edmundsbury, 1643; Earl of St Albans (2nd creation), 1660
Thomas Hervey; 1625–1694	Susan	Thomas Jermyn; 1604–1659	Henry Jermyn; 1605–1684; 1st Earl of St Albans and Baron Jermyn
Earldom of St Albans (2nd creation) extinct, 1684
Baron Hervey of Ickworth, 1703; Earl of Bristol, 1714	Baron Dover, 1685
John Hervey; 1665–1751; 1st Earl of Bristol and Baron Hervey	Thomas Jermyn; 1633–1703; 2nd Baron Jermyn	Henry Jermyn c. 1636–1708; 1st Baron Dover, 3rd Baron Jermyn
Baronies Dover and Jermyn extinct, 1708
Carr Hervey; 1691–1723 styled Lord Hervey	John Hervey; 1696–1743; 2nd Baron Hervey
George William Hervey; 1721–1775; 2nd Earl of Bristol and Baron Hervey	Augustus John Hervey; 1724–1779; 3rd Earl of Bristol and Baron Hervey	Frederick Augustus Hervey; 1730–1803; 4th Earl of Bristol and Baron Hervey
Marquess of Bristol and Earl Jermyn, 1826
Augustus Hervey b. 1747	George Hervey; 1755–c. 1764	John Augustus Hervey; 1757–1796 styled Lord Hervey	Frederick William Hervey; 1769–1859; 1st Marquess of Bristol and Earl Jermyn; 5th Earl of Bristol and Baron Hervey
Frederick William Hervey; 1800–1864; 2nd Marquess of Bristol and Earl Jermyn; 6th Earl of Bristol and Baron Hervey
Frederick William John Hervey; 1834–1907; 3rd Marquess of Bristol and Earl Jermyn; 7th Earl of Bristol and Baron Hervey	Augustus Henry Charles Hervey; 1837–1875
Capt. Charles Hervey; 1862–1893	Frederick William Fane Hervey; 1863–1951; 4th Marquess of Bristol and Earl Jermyn; 8th Earl of Bristol and Baron Hervey	Walter Hervey; 1865–1948 styled Lord Hervey (Note: The younger brothers of the 4th Marquess were allowed by a warrant of precedence from the King to "have, hold and enjoy the title, rank, place, pre-eminence and precedence as the sons [...] of a Marquess", because their father would have held the marquessate but for his predeceasing the previous holder.)	Rev. Manners Hervey; 1866–1944 styled Lord Hervey	Herbert Arthur Robert Hervey; 1870–1960; 5th Marquess of Bristol and Earl Jermyn; 9th Earl of Bristol and Baron Hervey
Victor Frederick Cochrane Hervey; 1915–1985; 6th Marquess of Bristol and Earl Jermyn; 10th Earl of Bristol and Baron Hervey
Frederick William John Augustus Hervey; 1954–1999; 7th Marquess of Bristol and Earl Jermyn; 11th Earl of Bristol and Baron Hervey	Frederick William Charles Nicholas Wentworth Hervey; 1961–1998	Frederick William Augustus Hervey b. 1979; 8th Marquess of Bristol and Earl Jermyn; 12th Earl of Bristol and Baron Hervey
Frederick Hervey b. 2022 styled Earl Jermyn

== Barons Dover (1788) ==
- Joseph Yorke, 1st Baron Dover (1724–1792)

== Barons Dover (1831) ==
- see Viscount Clifden

== See also ==
- Duke of Dover
- Earl of Dover
- Earl of Hardwicke
