= Earl of St Albans =

Extinct title in the Peerage of England

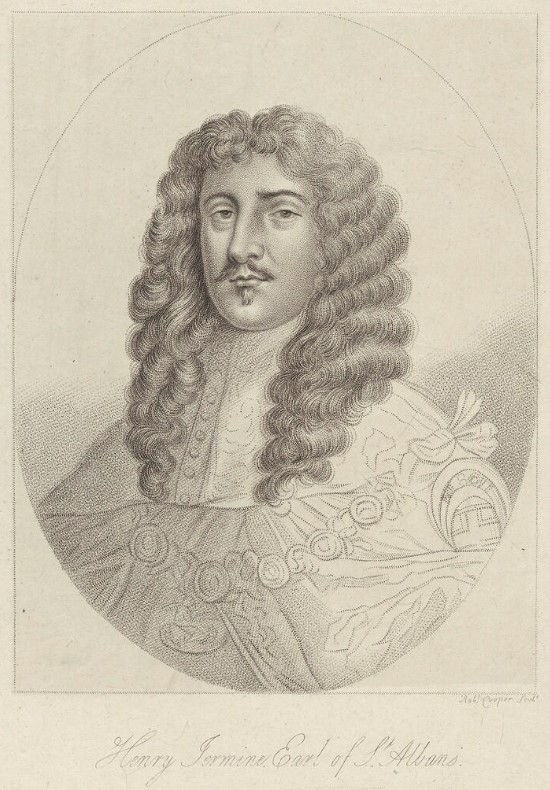
Henry Jermyn, Earl of St Albans

The Earl of St Albans was a title that was created twice in the 17th century, both times in the Peerage of England.

First, the title was created for Richard Bourke, Earl of Clanricarde by Charles I on 23 August 1628. This creation became extinct upon the death of his son, Ulick Burke, 1st Marquess of Clanricarde, in 1657.

Second, the title was created for Henry Jermyn, Baron Jermyn by Charles II on 27 April 1660 in recognition of Jermyn's loyalty during the Interregnum. This creation became extinct upon his death in 1684.

== Earls of St Albans, first creation (1628) ==
- Richard Burke, 4th Earl of Clanricarde (c. 1572–1635)
- Ulick Burke, 1st Marquess of Clanricarde (1604–1657)

== Earls of St Albans, second creation (1660) ==
- Henry Jermyn, 1st Earl of St Albans (1605–1684)

Family tree of the Barons Hervey, Earls of Bristol, and Marquesses of Bristol, Earl of St Albans (2nd creation) and Barons Jermyn

William Hervey d. 1538
John Hervey d. 1556	Nicholas Hervey lifespan unknown
William Hervey d. 1592	Henry Hervey lifespan unknown	Jane Thomas lifespan unknown
Baronet Hervey, of St. Martin's in the Fields, co. Middlesex, 1619; Baron Hervey of Rosse, co. Wexford, 1620; Baron Hervey of Kidbrooke, co. Kent, 1627/1628
John Hervey d. 1630	Robert Jermyn; 1539–1614	William Hervey d. 1642; 1st Baron Hervey of Rosse and of Kidbrooke, Baronet Hervey
Baron Hervey of Ross and of Kidbrooke and Baronet Hervey extinct, 1642
William Hervey d. 1660	Thomas Jermyn; 1573–1645
Baron Jermyn of St Edmundsbury, 1643; Earl of St Albans (2nd creation), 1660
Thomas Hervey; 1625–1694	Susan	Thomas Jermyn; 1604–1659	Henry Jermyn; 1605–1684; 1st Earl of St Albans, etc.
Earldom of St Albans (2nd creation) extinct, 1684
Baron Hervey of Ickworth, 1703; Earl of Bristol, 1714	Baron Dover, 1685
John Hervey; 1665–1751; 1st Earl of Bristol, etc.	Thomas Jermyn; 1633–1703; 2nd Baron Jermyn	Henry Jermyn c. 1636–1708; 1st Baron Dover, 3rd Baron Jermyn
Baronies Dover and Jermyn extinct, 1708
Carr Hervey; 1691–1723 styled Lord Hervey	John Hervey; 1696–1743; 2nd Baron Hervey
George William Hervey; 1721–1775; 2nd Earl of Bristol, etc.	Augustus John Hervey; 1724–1779; 3rd Earl of Bristol, etc.	Frederick Augustus Hervey; 1730–1803; 4th Earl of Bristol, etc.
Marquess of Bristol and Earl Jermyn, 1826
Augustus Hervey b. 1747	George Hervey; 1755–c. 1764	John Augustus Hervey; 1757–1796 styled Lord Hervey	Frederick William Hervey; 1769–1859; 1st Marquess of Bristol, etc., 5th Earl of Bristol, etc.
Frederick William Hervey; 1800–1864; 2nd Marquess of Bristol, etc., 6th Earl of Bristol, etc.
Frederick William John Hervey; 1834–1907; 3rd Marquess of Bristol, etc., 7th Earl of Bristol, etc.	Augustus Henry Charles Hervey; 1837–1875
Capt. Charles Hervey; 1862–1893	Frederick William Fane Hervey; 1863–1951; 4th Marquess of Bristol, etc., 8th Earl of Bristol, etc.	Walter Hervey; 1865–1948 styled Lord Hervey (Note: The younger brothers of the 4th Marquess were allowed by a warrant of precedence from the King to "have, hold and enjoy the title, rank, place, pre-eminence and precedence as the sons [...] of a Marquess", because their father would have held the marquessate but for his predeceasing the previous holder.)	Rev. Manners Hervey; 1866–1944 styled Lord Hervey	Herbert Arthur Robert Hervey; 1870–1960; 5th Marquess of Bristol, etc., 9th Earl of Bristol, etc.
Victor Frederick Cochrane Hervey; 1915–1985; 6th Marquess of Bristol, etc., 10th Earl of Bristol, etc.
Frederick William John Augustus Hervey; 1954–1999; 7th Marquess of Bristol, etc., 11th Earl of Bristol, etc.	Frederick William Charles Nicholas Wentworth Hervey; 1961–1998	Frederick William Augustus Hervey b. 1979; 8th Marquess of Bristol, etc., 12th Earl of Bristol, etc.
Frederick Hervey b. 2022 styled Earl Jermyn

== See also ==
- Duke of St Albans
- Earl of Clanricarde
- Earl of Verulam
- Viscount St Albans
