= Baron Jermyn =

Extinct barony in the Peerage of England

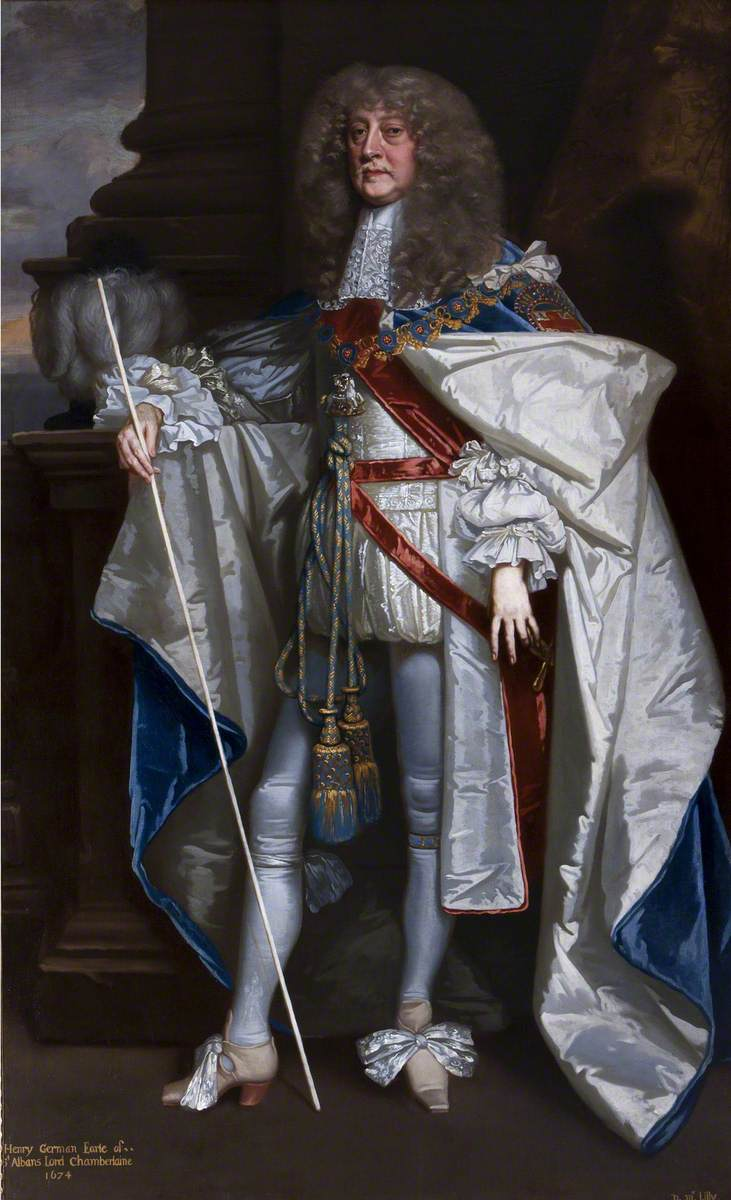
Henry Jermyn, 1st Earl of St Albans, first Baron Jermyn of St Edmundsbury

Baron Jermyn, of St Edmundsbury, was a title in the Peerage of England.

It was created in 1643 for Henry Jermyn, with remainder, failing heirs male of his own, to his nephews. In 1660 he was further honoured when he was made Earl of St Albans, with normal remainder to the heirs male of his body. On Lord St Alban's death in 1684 the earldom became extinct while he was succeeded in the barony according to the special remainder by his nephew, the second Baron. He had earlier represented Bury St Edmunds in Parliament.

On his death the title passed to his younger brother, the third Baron. He had already been created Baron Dover in 1685. In 1689 the deposed James II created him Baron Jermyn of Royston, Baron Ipswich, Viscount Cheveley and Earl of Dover in the Jacobite Peerage. However, these titles were not recognised by the English government, although Jermyn was generally known as the Earl of Dover. All the titles became extinct on Jermyn's death in 1708.

The family seat was Rushbrooke Hall in Rushbrooke, Suffolk.

== Barons Jermyn (1643) ==
- Henry Jermyn, 1st Earl of St Albans, 1st Baron Jermyn (c. 1604–1684)
- Thomas Jermyn, 2nd Baron Jermyn (d. 1703)
- Henry Jermyn, 3rd Baron Jermyn, 1st Baron Dover (c. 1636–1708)

== Family tree ==
Family tree of the Barons Hervey, Earls of Bristol, and Marquesses of Bristol, Earl of St Albans (2nd creation) and Barons Jermyn

William Hervey d. 1538
John Hervey d. 1556 | Nicholas Hervey lifespan unknown
William Hervey d. 1592 | Henry Hervey lifespan unknown | Jane Thomas lifespan unknown
Baronet Hervey, of St. Martin's in the Fields, co. Middlesex, 1619; Baron Hervey of Rosse, co. Wexford, 1620; Baron Hervey of Kidbrooke, co. Kent, 1627/1628
John Hervey d. 1630 | Robert Jermyn; 1539–1614 | William Hervey d. 1642; 1st Baron Hervey of Rosse and of Kidbrooke, and Baronet Hervey
Baron Hervey of Ross and of Kidbrooke and Baronet Hervey extinct, 1642
William Hervey d. 1660 | Thomas Jermyn; 1573–1645
Baron Jermyn of St Edmundsbury, 1643; Earl of St Albans (2nd creation), 1660
Thomas Hervey; 1625–1694 | Susan | Thomas Jermyn; 1604–1659 | Henry Jermyn; 1605–1684; 1st Earl of St Albans and Baron Jermyn
Earldom of St Albans (2nd creation) extinct, 1684
Baron Hervey of Ickworth, 1703; Earl of Bristol, 1714 | Baron Dover, 1685
John Hervey; 1665–1751; 1st Earl of Bristol and Baron Hervey | Thomas Jermyn; 1633–1703; 2nd Baron Jermyn | Henry Jermyn c. 1636–1708; 1st Baron Dover, 3rd Baron Jermyn
Baronies Dover and Jermyn extinct, 1708
Carr Hervey; 1691–1723 styled Lord Hervey | John Hervey; 1696–1743; 2nd Baron Hervey
George William Hervey; 1721–1775; 2nd Earl of Bristol and Baron Hervey | Augustus John Hervey; 1724–1779; 3rd Earl of Bristol and Baron Hervey | Frederick Augustus Hervey; 1730–1803; 4th Earl of Bristol and Baron Hervey
Marquess of Bristol and Earl Jermyn, 1826
Augustus Hervey b. 1747 | George Hervey; 1755–c. 1764 | John Augustus Hervey; 1757–1796 styled Lord Hervey | Frederick William Hervey; 1769–1859; 1st Marquess of Bristol and Earl Jermyn; 5th Earl of Bristol and Baron Hervey
Frederick William Hervey; 1800–1864; 2nd Marquess of Bristol and Earl Jermyn; 6th Earl of Bristol and Baron Hervey
Frederick William John Hervey; 1834–1907; 3rd Marquess of Bristol and Earl Jermyn; 7th Earl of Bristol and Baron Hervey | Augustus Henry Charles Hervey; 1837–1875
Capt. Charles Hervey; 1862–1893 | Frederick William Fane Hervey; 1863–1951; 4th Marquess of Bristol and Earl Jermyn; 8th Earl of Bristol and Baron Hervey | Walter Hervey; 1865–1948 styled Lord Hervey (Note: The younger brothers of the 4th Marquess were allowed by a warrant of precedence from the King to "have, hold and enjoy the title, rank, place, pre-eminence and precedence as the sons [...] of a Marquess", because their father would have held the marquessate but for his predeceasing the previous holder.) | Rev. Manners Hervey; 1866–1944 styled Lord Hervey | Herbert Arthur Robert Hervey; 1870–1960; 5th Marquess of Bristol and Earl Jermyn; 9th Earl of Bristol and Baron Hervey
Victor Frederick Cochrane Hervey; 1915–1985; 6th Marquess of Bristol and Earl Jermyn; 10th Earl of Bristol and Baron Hervey
Frederick William John Augustus Hervey; 1954–1999; 7th Marquess of Bristol and Earl Jermyn; 11th Earl of Bristol and Baron Hervey | Frederick William Charles Nicholas Wentworth Hervey; 1961–1998 | Frederick William Augustus Hervey b. 1979; 8th Marquess of Bristol and Earl Jermyn; 12th Earl of Bristol and Baron Hervey
Frederick Hervey b. 2022 styled Earl Jermyn
