= Torksey =

Village in Lincolnshire, England

Coordinates: 53.298604°N 0.745252°W

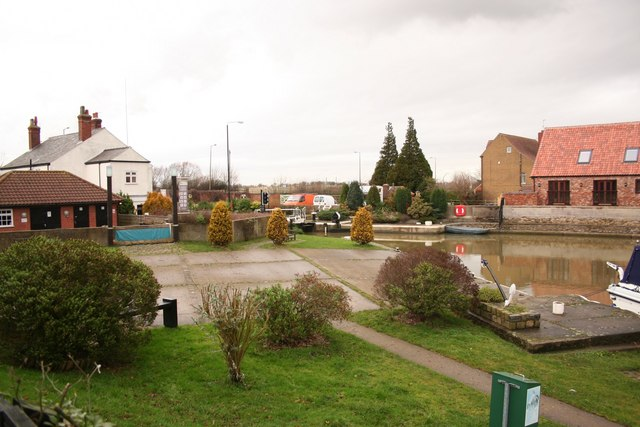
- Torksey Lock slipway

- Location within Lincolnshire
- Population: 875 (2011 census)
- OS grid reference: SK837786
  - London: 130 mi (210 km) S
- District: West Lindsey
- Shire county: Lincolnshire
- Region: East Midlands
- Country: England
- Sovereign state: United Kingdom
- Post town: LINCOLN
- Postcode district: LN1
- Police: Lincolnshire
- Fire: Lincolnshire
- Ambulance: East Midlands
- UK Parliament: Gainsborough

Torksey is a small village in the West Lindsey district of Lincolnshire, England. The population of the civil parish at the 2011 census was 875. It is situated on the A156 road, 7 miles (11 km) south of Gainsborough and 9 miles (14 km) north-west of Lincoln, and on the eastern bank of the tidal River Trent, which here forms the boundary with Nottinghamshire.

It is notable historically as the site of a Roman canal, a major Viking camp, the late medieval Torksey Castle and the Torksey Viaduct.

== Etymology ==
Torksey is derived from an Anglo-Saxon place name (OE Turecesīeġ), which comprises a personal name (Turec) + īeġ (island), giving an overall meaning of Turec's island.

== History ==
Foss Dyke, a canal generally believed to be of Roman 2nd century origin, joins the River Trent by way of a series of lock-gates about 0.5 miles (0.8 km) south of the village.

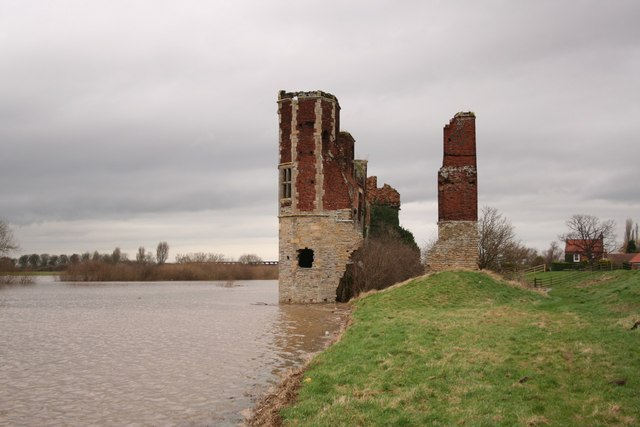
Torksey Castle, a ruinous manor house

During the 9th century, Torksey was part of the Anglo-Saxon Kingdom of Lindsey. In the late 860s, a Viking invasion force known to the English as the "Great Heathen Army" conquered eastern England. In 871–2, the Vikings established a winter camp in London, but returned to Northumbria soon afterwards, following a rebellion against their rule. During 872–3, the Great Heathen Army established its winter quarters at Torksey.

The archaeological remains of the winter camp lie between the modern villages of Torksey and Marton east of the River Trent. Geophysical surveys and excavations revealed that it occupied a total area of roughly fifty-five hectares.

A type of pottery, named Torksey ware, was produced near Torksey from the late-9th century.

An archaeological project was developed from earlier 2011 investigations and was carried out by the British Museum in partnership with the University of York and with the support of the British Academy, Society of Antiquaries of London, and the Robert Kiln Trust. Archaeological data continues to be acquired via metal detecting and over one thousand items of Viking-Age metalwork have been discovered.

== Notable buildings ==
The 16th-century Torksey Castle was destroyed in August 1645 during the English Civil War; its remains are on the river side of the dike which separates it from dry land. It is now Grade I listed.

Torksey Viaduct, a disused Grade II* listed railway bridge, has two 130 feet (40 m) spans across the River Trent. It was built between 1847 and 1849 to carry the Manchester, Sheffield and Lincolnshire Railway (Clarborough Junction-Sykes Junction branch). It is of unusual design and is regarded as the first box girder bridge.
