= Torksey Castle =

Ruined manor house in England

Coordinates: 53°18′00″N 0°44′42″W

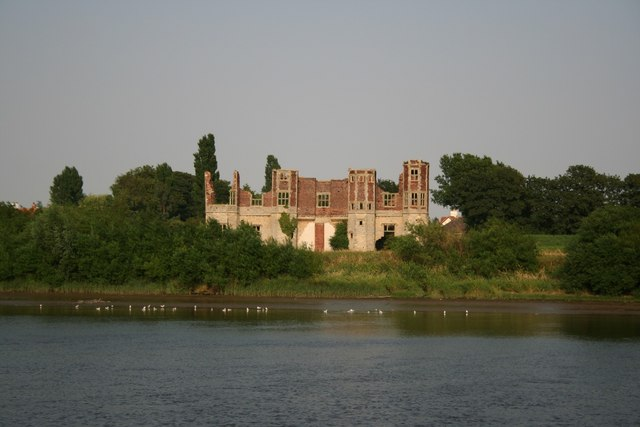
Torksey Castle from across the River Trent

Torksey Castle is an Elizabethan manor house in the village of Torksey on the east bank of the River Trent in Lincolnshire, England. It is 12 miles (19 km) northwest of Lincoln and 7 miles (11 km) south of Gainsborough.

It is a 16th-century Tudor stone-built fortified manor house founded by the Jermyn family of Suffolk and is now a Grade-I listed building and a scheduled ancient monument but the building is on the Heritage at Risk Register. The site is private, with no public access, and is only visible from the A156 road and a public footpath, on the west bank of the River Trent.

== History ==
The country house was built by Sir Robert Jermyn in c. 1560. It may have been built as a waypoint for the Jermyn family's travels to York or as a gift to one of their sons. In 1645 during the English Civil War, the property was slighted while in the ownership of Thomas Jermyn. Having been taken from the Royalist Jermyn family by Parliamentarians, it was burned by Royalist soldiers based at Newark. Very little of the structure remained. Though the Jermyn family retained control of the estate after the Civil War, the property was not restored, but continued to deteriorate. The remains of the buildings were scavenged for usable building supplies by residents of the area.

While the proximity to the River Trent may have stood the family in good stead for transportation and commerce (as the Lords of Torksey had been permitted to levy tolls on the river's travellers) it also contributed to the damage of the building through flooding. In 1961, the Trent River Board buried part of the ruins when raising the river bank.

The west facade and part of the rear wall survive. English Heritage undertook stabilisation of the building in 1991 but the building is on the Heritage at Risk Register.

== Origin of the name ==
It is not known why Torksey Castle was popularly termed a castle. The building was never used as a fortress and would not have been suitable for that purpose. Although the structure is a hall rather than a castle, it bears similar architectural design features, including angular projecting towers and crow-stepped gables. According to Heritage Lincoln, these features may have led to its being termed castle. Alternatively it may have been built on the site of an earlier medieval castle.

== Construction of the hall ==
The lower or ground floor level is built of thin limestone blocks, is very plain and has small mullioned windows, meaning it was probably used as the domestic area of the house, where the servants would have worked, but probably not slept. The upper level is built in red brick in English bond and most probably constitutes a piano nobile, a principle still very much new in Northern Europe at the time. Brick at the time, although having been used previously, had rarely been in use in British secular architecture before this period. Brick was widely considered at this time a lavish building material, due to their handmade nature, the cost of the labour involved, and the scarcity of brick and its manufacture, it was often a case that the kilns used to fire the bricks were constructed afresh on the building site. All of which added to the expense.

The hall consists of a planned series of ranges around a square courtyard. The symmetrical nature of the surviving main facade makes it a great departure from the usual ad hoc nature which preceded it, and indeed continued up until the mid-seventeenth century.

== Depictions in Art ==
Torksey Castle was painted by Peter De Wint in 1835. The watercolour is now held in the Usher Gallery in Lincoln.

== Pictures ==
Pictures taken January 2024. The panoramic view shows stabilisation work carried out by English Heritage in 1991.

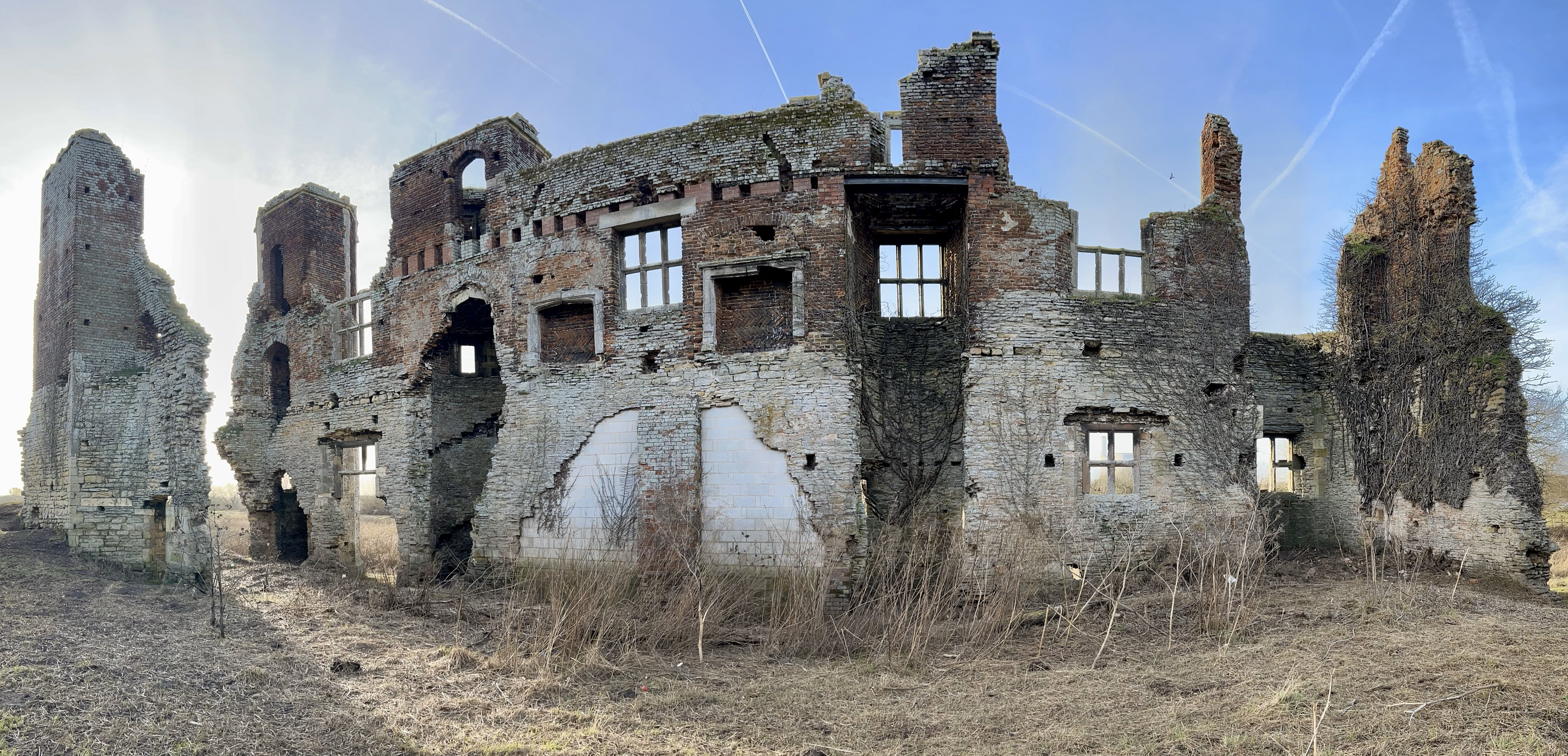
Panoramic view

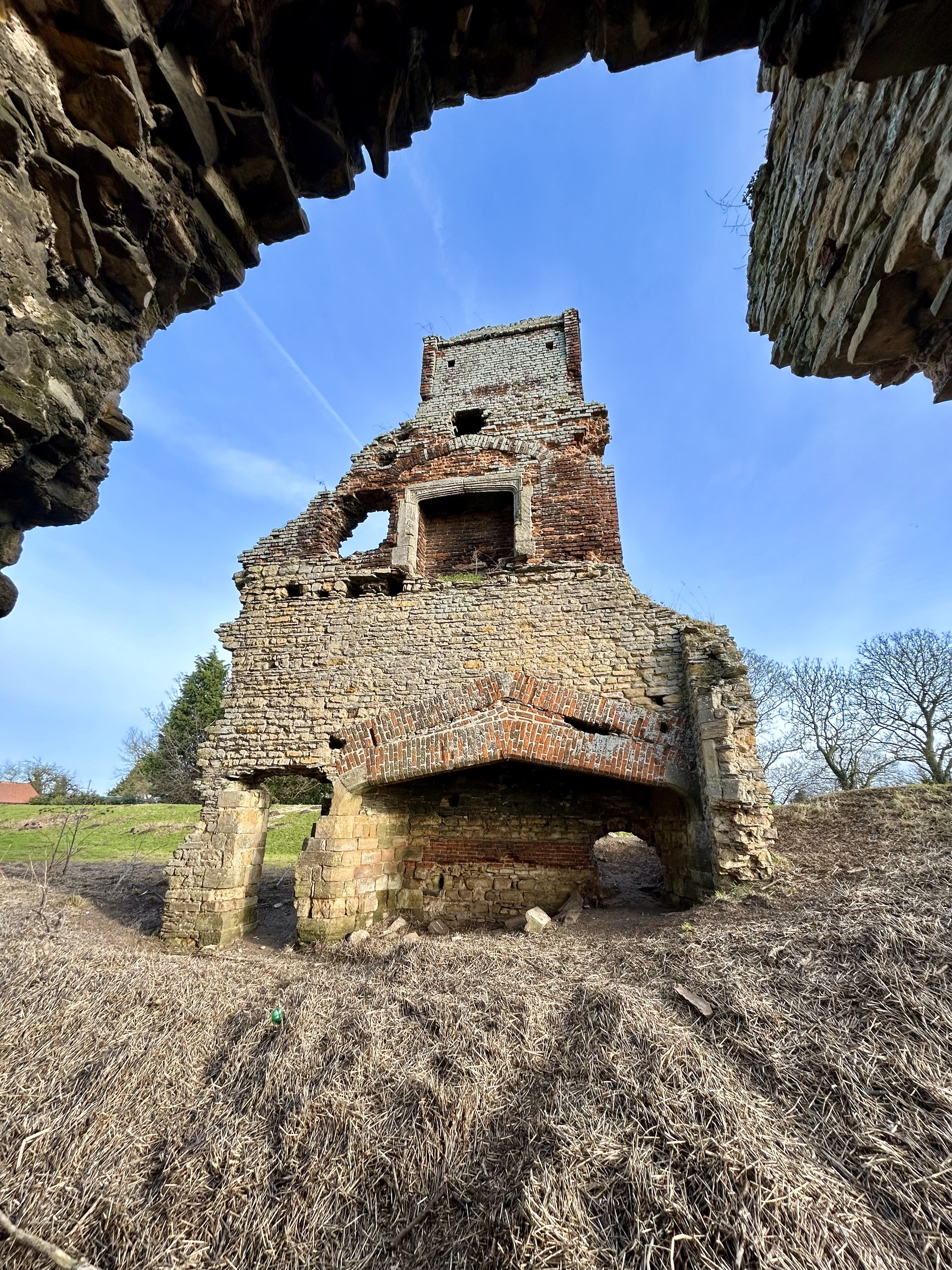
Fireplace & chimney

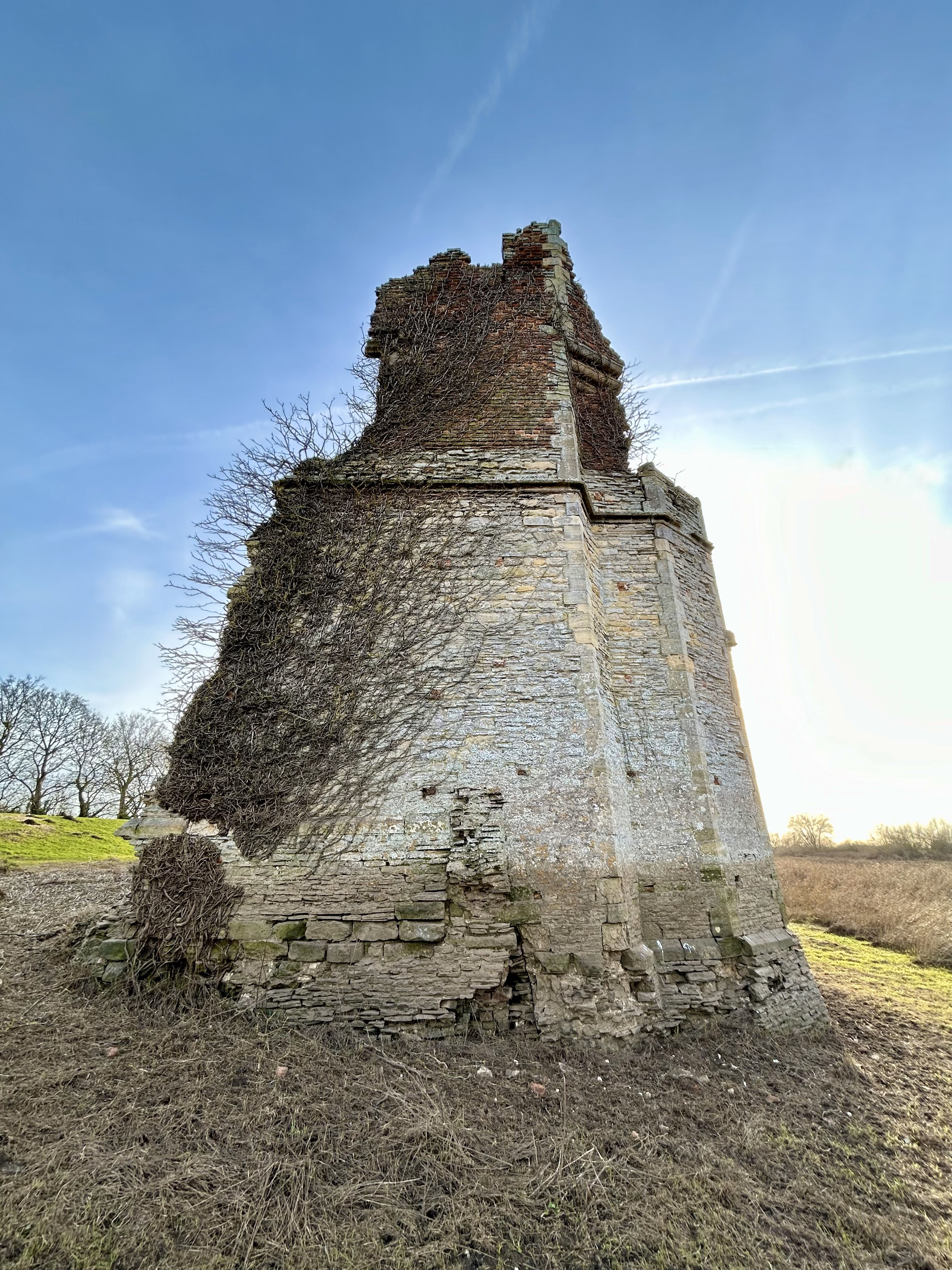
Fireplace tower from side

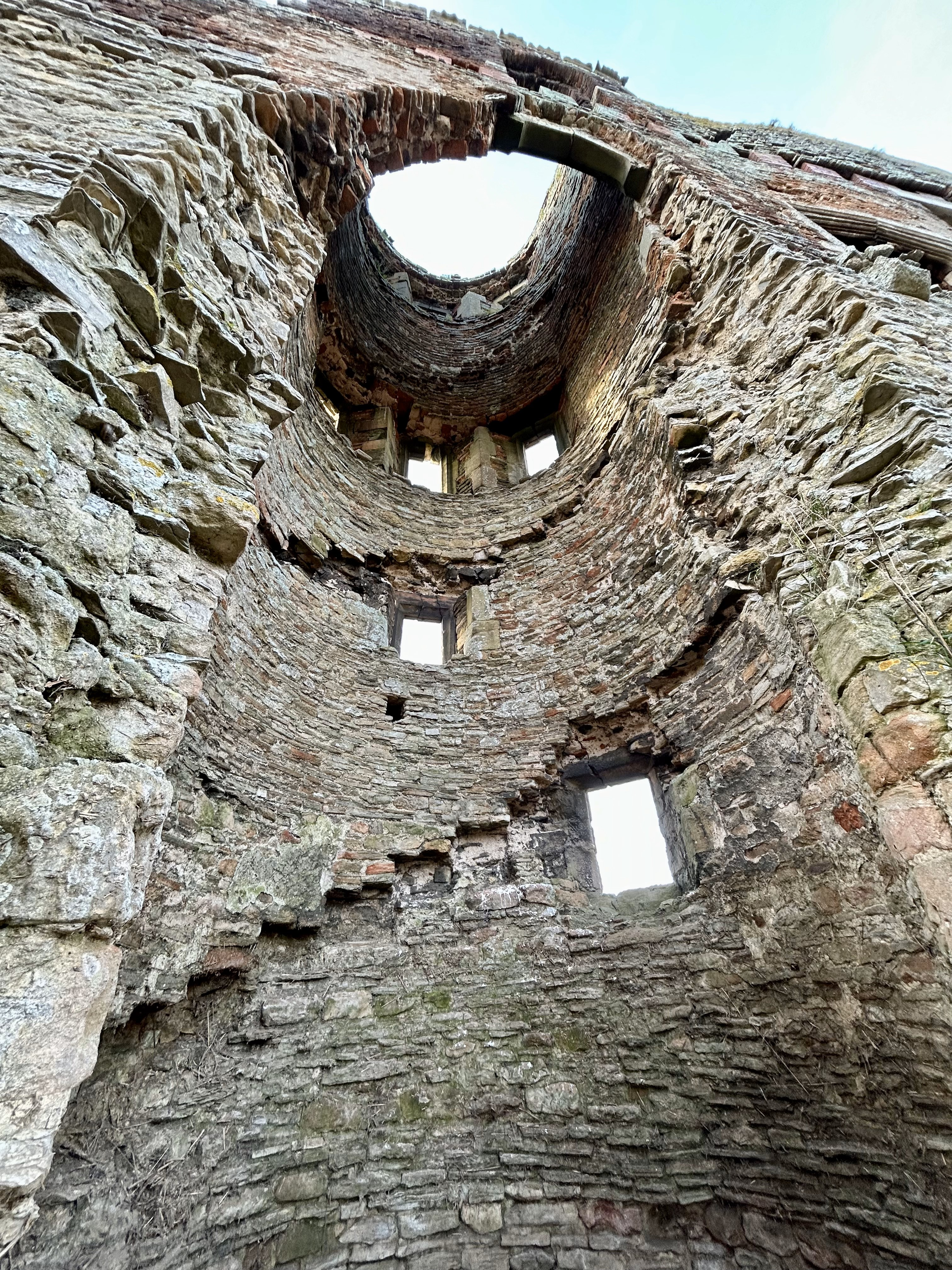
Spiral staircase
