= Humphrey Nicholls =

English politician

Humphrey Nicholls (1577–1643) was an English politician who sat in the House of Commons from 1628 to 1629.

Nicholls was the son of Humphrey Nicholls of Cornwall. He matriculated at Exeter College, Oxford on 28 March 1595, aged 17. He was of Penvose, St. Tudy, Cornwall. In 1628, he was elected member of parliament for Bodmin and sat until 1629 when King Charles decided to rule without parliament for eleven years

Nicholls died at the age of about 65 and was buried on 31 March 1642.

Parliament of England
Preceded by Henry Jermyn; Sir Richard Weston	Member of Parliament for Bodmin; 1628–1629; With: Sir Robert Killigrew	Parliament suspended until 1640
