= John Godbolt =

English judge and politician

John Godbolt or Godbold (c. 1582 – 3 August 1648) was an English judge and politician who sat in the House of Commons in 1640. He presided over witchcraft trials in East Anglia.

Godbolt was the son of Thomas Godbolt, of Tannington, Suffolk. He was at school at Worlingworth, Suffolk and admitted to Caius College, Cambridge on 29 June 1599 aged 17. He was scholar from 1600 to 1602 and was admitted at Gray's Inn on 16 November 1605. In 1633 he recorder of Bury St Edmunds. He became Chief Justice of the Isle of Ely, Cambridgeshire in 1638.

In April 1640, Godbolt was elected Member of Parliament for Bury St Edmunds in the Short Parliament.

Godbolt was Judge at the Bury St Edmunds assizes in 1645 for the trial of alleged witches of whom two men and sixteen women were sentenced to death and 120 suspects were kept in gaol. However he forbade the use of the swimming test for witches. The sessions were adjourned because of the approach of Royalist forces, but subsequently another fifty were hanged as witches. Godbolt was made Justice of the Common Pleas in 1647.

Godbolt died in 1648 at the age of 66.

Parliament of England
Vacant Parliament suspended since 1629	Member of Parliament for Bury St Edmunds; 1640; With: Sir Thomas Jermyn	Succeeded by Sir Thomas Barnardiston, 1st Baronet; Thomas Jermyn
