= Henry Jermyn, 1st Earl of St Albans =

English politician, diplomat and courtier (1605–1684)

The Right Honourable The Earl of St Albans KG PC
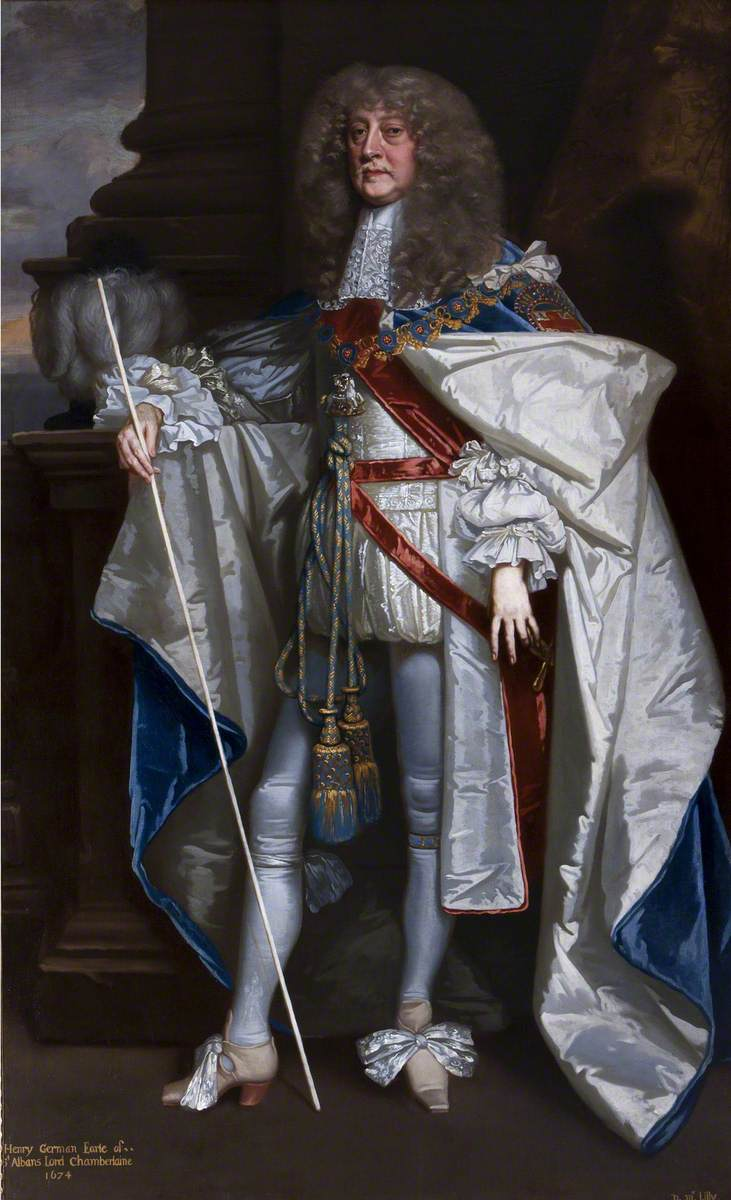
- Portrait of St Albans by Peter Lely

Lord Chamberlain
- In office 1672–1674
- Monarch: Charles II
- Preceded by: The Earl of Manchester
- Succeeded by: The Earl of Arlington

Personal details
- Born: 1605 Lothbury, City of London, England
- Died: 1684 (aged 78–79) St James's Square, City of Westminster, England
- Parent(s): Sir Thomas Jermyn; Catherine Killigrew
- Relatives: Henry Jermyn, 1st Baron Dover (nephew)

Military service
- Allegiance: Royalists
- Years of service: 1643–1644
- Rank: Colonel
- Commands: The Queen's Lifeguard of Horse
- Battles/wars: First English Civil War

Henry Jermyn, 1st Earl of Saint Albans KG PC (1605 – January 1684) was an English politician, diplomat, and property developer, who was one of the most influential courtiers of the Carolean era.

Jermyn sat in the House of Commons of England at various times between 1625 and 1643 when he was raised to the English peerage as Baron Jermyn. Having formed an intimate friendship with Henrietta Maria of France in the 1630s, he constantly devised and promoted schemes to involve foreign powers in English political affairs, both before and after the execution of Charles I in 1649. A long-standing advocate of pro-French policies, he became one of the most influential courtiers of the Interregnum and reign of Charles II, serving as both ambassador to France and Lord Chamberlain. He remained the favourite of Henrietta Maria until her death in 1669, and was rumored to have secretly married her sometime after Charles I's death.

Today, Jermyn is known as the 'Founder of the West End' owing to his role in the development of St James's into a predominantly aristocratic residential area of London.

== Early life ==
Jermyn was the fourth but second surviving son of Sir Thomas Jermyn (1572–1645) of Rushbrooke, Suffolk, Vice-Chamberlain to Charles I, and his wife Catherine, daughter of Sir William Killigrew of Hanworth, Middlesex (a sister of Sir Robert Killigrew). He was baptised at St Margaret's Lothbury, London on 25 March 1605. He was brought up at Rushbrooke Hall and possibly attended Bury St Edmunds Grammar School.

In 1618 he undertook a tour of Europe for three years and in 1623 he became a member of the household of the Earl of Bristol in Madrid as a gentleman in attendance on the English embassy. While living in Spain he met the Duke of Buckingham and Jermyn "abounded in the expression of his joy for the honour and favours done him" by the duke. Jermyn's eldest brother, Robert Jermyn, died in December 1623. In February 1624, the young Jermyn was sent to Paris as a member of the embassy of Henry Rich, 1st Earl of Holland. There, Jermyn met Henrietta Maria for the first time and in May 1625 he was among those who accompanied the young princess to England for her marriage.

== Politician and courtier ==
In 1625, while still underage, Jermyn was elected Member of Parliament for Bodmin on the interest of his uncle Sir Robert Killigrew, and was re-elected MP for the seat in 1626. He made no contribution to parliamentary proceedings in either year. He continued to attract the attention of Henrietta Maria, now queen consort of Charles I of England, and in 1627 Jermyn was appointed a gentleman usher in her private household. In July 1627 he was sent to France by the queen to convey her condolences to Louis XIII on the death of the duchess of Orléans. He became Henrietta Maria's vice-chamberlain in 1628 and the same year he was elected as the MP for Liverpool on the nomination of Humphrey May. During the parliamentary recess, Jermyn was seconded to Jersey to train the island's militia.

=== Villiers affair ===
In 1632 Jermyn was again sent to Paris, this time to congratulate the queen's mother, Marie de' Medici, on surviving a coach accident. In 1633 he jeopardised his position at court when Eleanor Villiers, one of the queen's ladies in waiting, became pregnant and claimed it was Jermyn's illegitimate child. Upon questioning by the king, Jermyn admitted the unlawful sexual relations, but refused to marry Villiers. This was depsite Villiers' aunt, Katherine Villiers, Duchess of Buckingham, offering Jermyn £8,000 as a dowry. On 4 June 1633, Eleanor's brother, Lord Grandison, challenged Jermyn to a duel. For their immoral behaviour and to prevent a duel from taking place, both Jermyn and Villiers were imprisoned in the Tower of London for several months. In September 1633, Charles I sent Jermyn an ultimatum – marry Eleanor Villiers or face exile. Jermyn chose exile, and was sent first to France and then to Jersey by Charles I, but he was allowed to return and resume his role at court in August 1634 after the queen lobbied for his cause. His favour with Henrietta Maria was undamaged and in 1639 his dominant position in her household was confirmed when he was appointed her Master of the Horse.

=== Civil War and exile ===
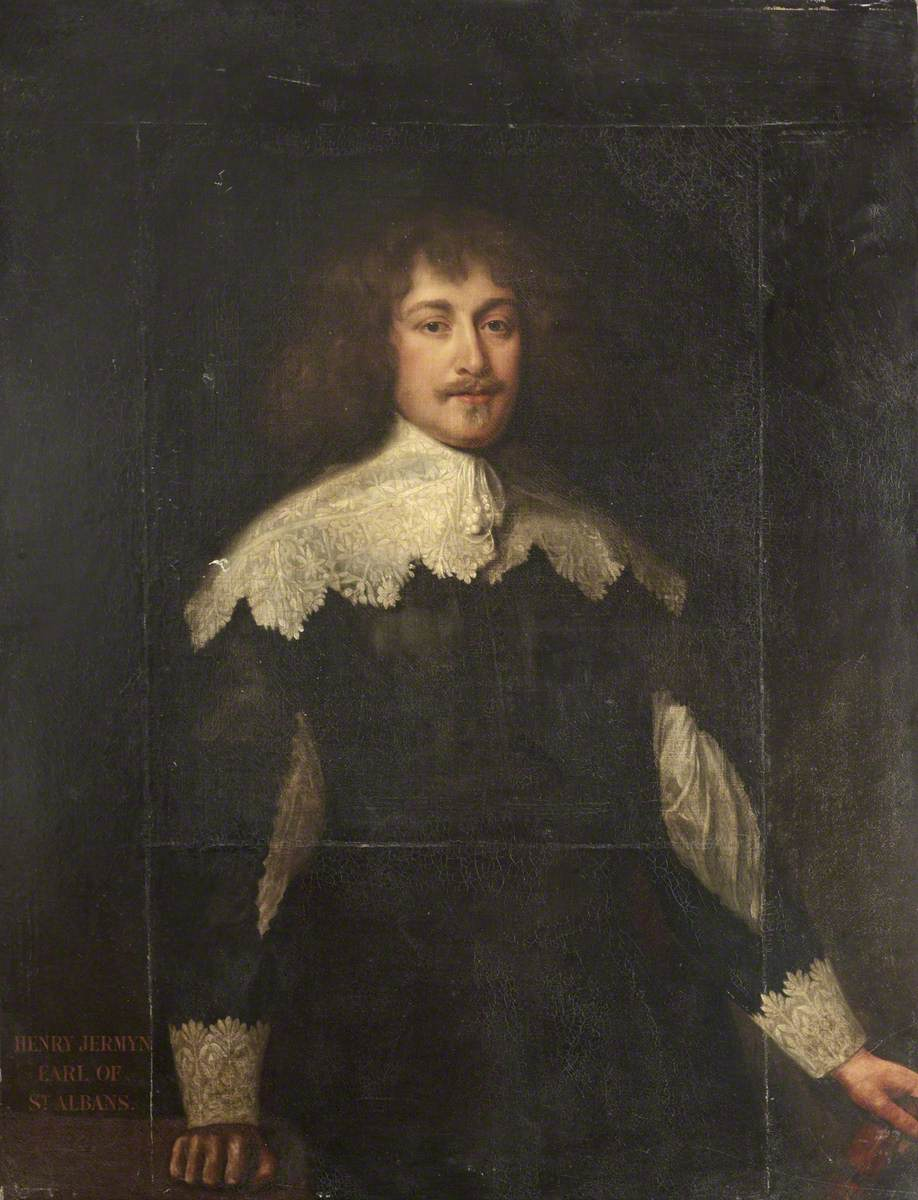
Henry Jermyn painted in circa 1640

In April 1640, Jermyn was elected MP for Corfe Castle in the Short Parliament together with his brother Thomas. The brothers were both elected MPs for Bury St Edmunds in the Long Parliament in November 1640 in the face of opposition from their Roundhead relative, Sir William Spring. Within and outside Parliament, both Jermyn brothers were active and ardent Royalists. Jermyn took a prominent part in the failed First Army Plot of 1641, in which he had been tasked with securing the Tower of London and freeing the Royalist Earl of Strafford. On the plot's discovery, Jermyn fled first to Portsmouth and then to France after the king ordered George Goring, Lord Goring to ensure Jermyn's safe passage out of the country.

In August 1642, fighting began in the First English Civil War. That year, Jermyn joined Henrietta Maria in The Hague where he assisted her to raise loans, buy weapons and recruit troops for the Royalist cause. According to the antiquary William Dugdale, Jermyn "spared neither pains nor charge in obtaining arms and ammunition from foreign parts, besides the exposal of himself to no little hazard in attending on the royal person into England".

Returning to England with Henrietta Maria in February 1643, he resumed his personal attendance on the queen and was appointed colonel of the queen's regiment of horse, her personal bodyguard. He landed with the queen at Bridlington in Yorkshire, before escorting her through Parliamentarian territory to the king at Oxford. He was present at the Royalist victory at the Battle of Burton Bridge in July. On 8 September 1643 he was raised to the peerage as Baron Jermyn of St Edmundsbury, ostensibly so that, should he fall into Parliamentarian hands, he would be beheaded, and not hanged, drawn and quartered. Shortly afterwards, on 18 September 1643, he received a bullet wound while leading his regiment at the Battle of Aldbourne Chase. The same year he was made a colonel of horse in the king's army. His reputation as a soldier was mixed, in part owing to his reputation for profligacy: "He is a splendid, fortunate, liberal man... a man who has the favour of the courtiers but is not esteemed by the soldiers". In 1644 he became the queen's chamberlain. A few months later, with the Royalist war effort faltering, in July 1644 he accompanied Henrietta Maria back to France. There, he continued to act as her secretary and confidant, while also attempting to raise support for the Royalist war effort. On the death of his father in 1645, he became the owner of Cheveley Park.

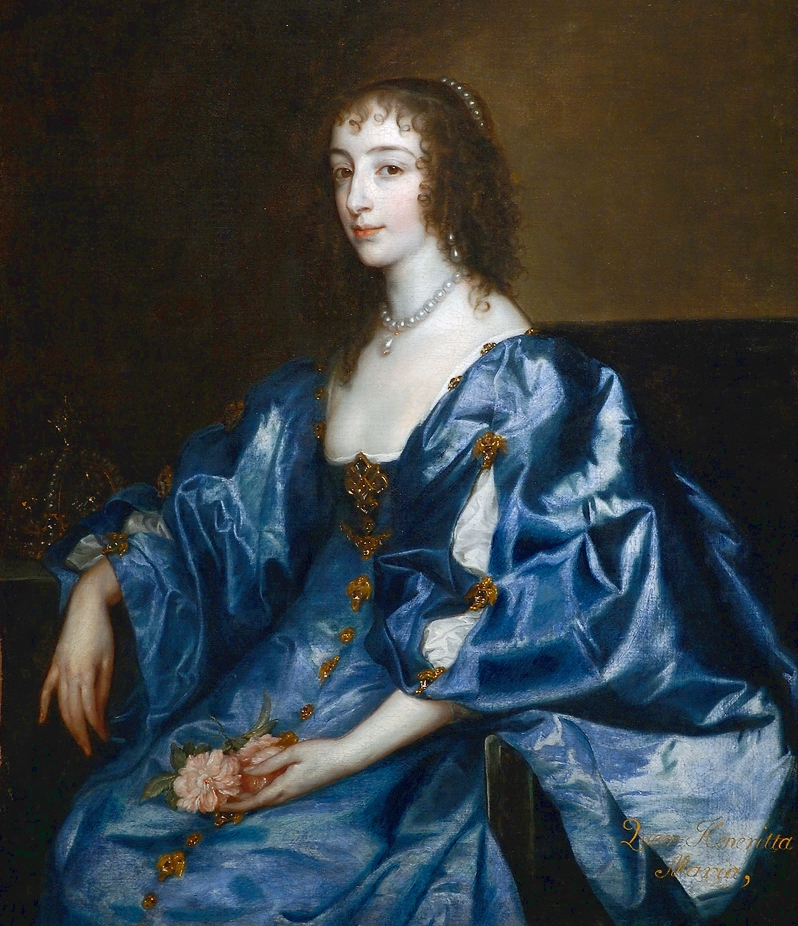
Jermyn was the favourite and confidant of Henrietta Maria of France from the 1630s until her death in 1669; he was even rumoured to have married her in secret

In 1645, Jermyn was made Governor of Jersey in succession to his father. He came into conflict with Sir Edward Hyde when he brought the Prince of Wales from Jersey to Paris, against Hyde's advice. In 1647, Jermyn advised the king to promise a Presbyterian church in England in order to gain Scottish assistance against parliament. This led the king to remark that "the Lord Jermyn did not understand anything of the church". Charles I made Jermyn his ambassador to France and the Dutch Republic prior to his execution in 1649. In this capacity, Jermyn entered prolonged and ultimately fruitless negotiations to secure French or Dutch military support for the Royalists, including through proposing several royal marriages. Towards the end of the First English Civil War, a number of Jermyn's letters were captured and published by Parliament in order to expose the king's attempt to bring foreign powers into the conflict. Jermyn advocated for the Royalist alliance with Scotland which led to the Anglo-Scottish war of 1650 to 1652. In 1651 he was appointed to the Privy Council of England.

In France, Jermyn became the leading figure in the 'Louvre faction', a group of English royalists who had attached themselves to Henrietta Maria's court-in-exile, based initially out of the Louvre Palace. Following The Fronde, in 1653 the Queen Dowager swapped accommodation with Anne of Austria and her court relocated to the Palais-Royal. Other members of the faction included Henry Wilmot, Lord John Byron, Kenelm Digby, George Digby, Henry Percy, John Colepeper and Charles Gerard. The group was marked by their close adherence to Henrietta Maria, their pro-French outlook and their opposition to the influence of Hyde over Charles II. Jermyn proposed to Charles a plan to cede the Channel Islands to France in exchange for military aid. Jermyn succeeding in getting large grants from the king's allowance and was able to live in relative luxury, despite the court itself being impoverished. When Charles went to Breda, Jermyn initially remained in Paris with Henrietta Maria, but later traveled to join the king ahead of his return to England. The Queen Dowager persuaded her son to create Jermyn Earl of St Albans on 27 April 1660.

=== Restoration ===
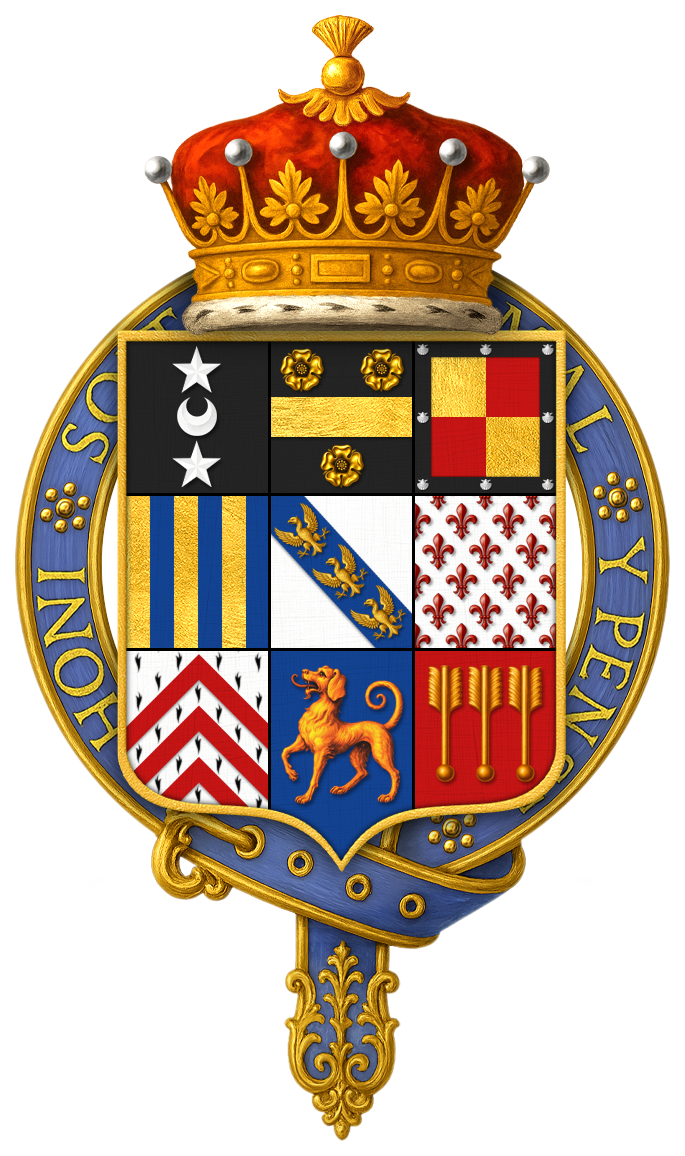
The arms of Henry Jermyn, 1st Earl of St Albans, as a Knight of the Garter

At the Restoration in May 1660, Hyde ensured that Jermyn was kept out of government, although he was given other offices. St Albans was appointed Joint Registrar and Keeper of the Registry at the Court of Chancery and made a justice of the peace for Suffolk and Middlesex. On 24 April 1662, he was appointed Keeper of Greenwich House and Park, and Steward of East and West Greenwich. St Albans was also trustee of the English manors and lands of Queen Catherine of Braganza from 1662. In July 1663 he was present at the birth of James Stuart, Duke of Cambridge. On 27 December 1663, St Albans was elected Grand Master of the English grand lodge of Freemasons; he appointed Sir John Denham his deputy and Christopher Wren his warden.

He acted as Charles II's ambassador to France throughout the 1660s and was supportive of the policy of friendship towards Louis XIV of France. At the Palace of Versailles, St Albans maintained an almost regal ambassadorial establishment. In 1660, he led negotiations for the marriage of Henrietta of England to Philippe I, Duke of Orléans, which took place in March 1661. St Albans also attempted to secure the marriage of the English king to a French princess, but was unsuccessful. On 23 June 1661, he and Louis XIV signed a renewal of a treaty between England and France, and entered negotiations for a new treaty of mutual defence. In 1667, he signed a further treaty with France which promised that England would not make any alliance hostile to the interests of Louis XIV for a year. He contributed largely to the close secret understanding between Charles II and Louis XIV, arranging the preliminaries of the Secret Treaty of Dover in 1669.

St Albans' obvious affinity with France was controversial at court; the Italian diplomat Lorenzo Magalotti wrote that he was "a man who is wholly devoted to French interests and who acts with no other purpose than to promote the vast projects of that crown at whatever cost to England". St Alban's biographer, Charles Harding Firth, observed that "no man did more to further the close union between England and France, which made England the subservient tool of Louis XIV". Charles II commented that St Albans was "more a Frenchman than an Englishman".

Before and during the Restoration, St Albans was, alongside Charles Berkeley and Henrietta Maria, the leading member of a lobby which acted in the interests of Irish Catholics dispossessed by the Act for the Settlement of Ireland 1652. His efforts were not entirely altruistic; through the Act of Settlement 1662, St Albans gained substantial amounts of money and land in Ireland. It was reported that St Albans accepted a bond of £1,000 from Patrick Sarsfield to secure the return of Sarsfield's Irish land and property.

St Albans witnessed the death of Henrietta Maria in France in August 1669 and was an executor of her will. That same year he hosted Cosimo III de' Medici, Grand Duke of Tuscany at his London townhouse. On 15 May 1671, he was made High Steward of Kingston of Thames. In 1672 he was appointed Lord Chamberlain, the most senior officer in the king's household, by the Cabal ministry and was made a Knight of the Garter. He briefly served in the First Danby ministry as Lord Chamberlain, but left office in 1674 after which he largely retired from public life. That year, he took up residence at the Jermyn family seat at Rushbrooke Hall. In 1683, the year before his death, he was described by John Evelyn as "a prudent old courtier and much enriched since his majesty's return".

== Founder of the West End ==
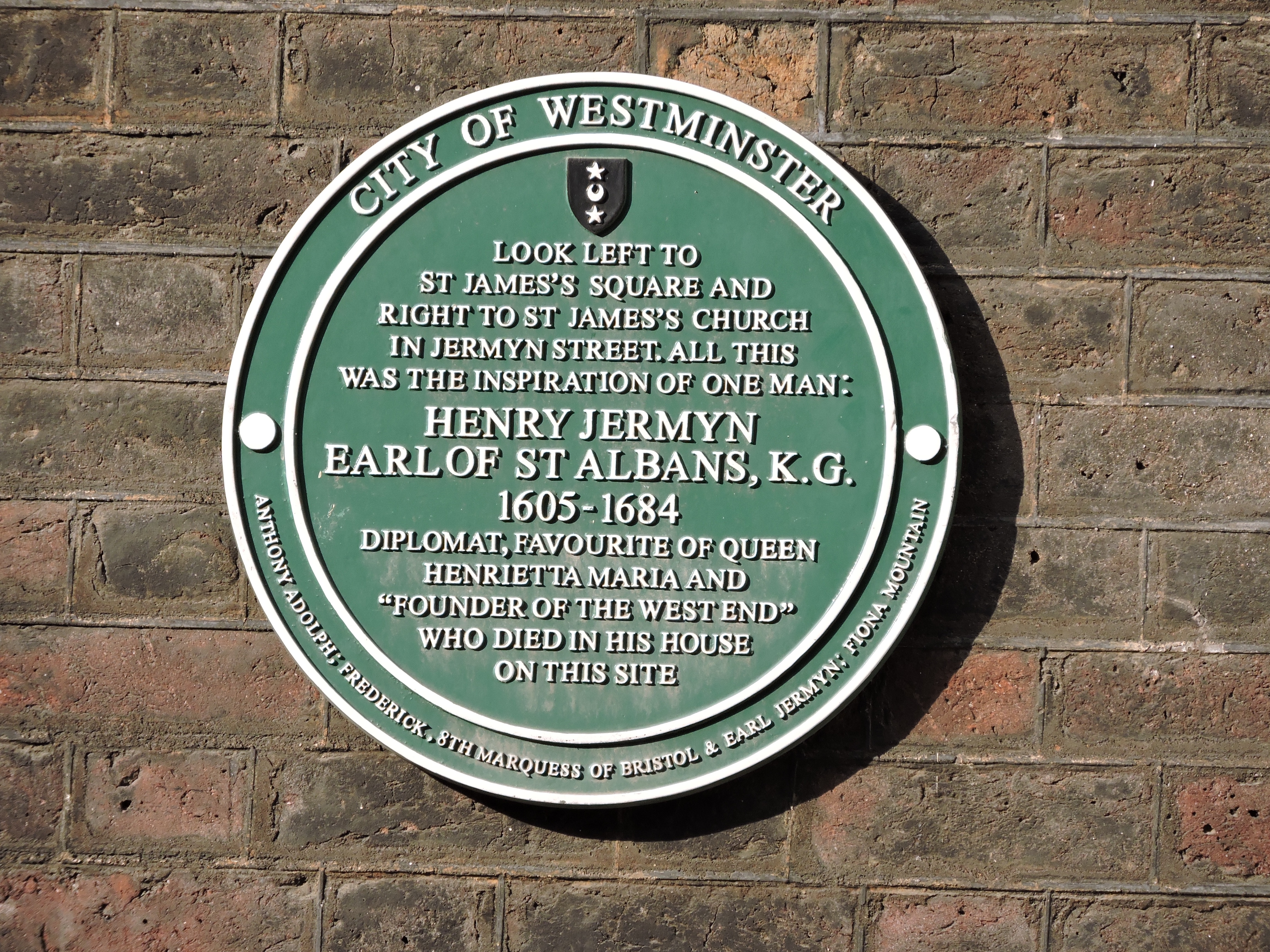
City of Westminster Green Plaque for Henry Jermyn, Earl of St Albans (1605–1684), located in Duke of York Street, St James's, London SW1

In September 1662, St Albans obtained a leasehold on a grant of land at Pall Mall Field in London north of St James's Palace. He began the development of the field with the construction of grand houses in the classical style at what would soon become St. James's Square. The City of London, which feared for its water supply, was hostile to the plan, but the support of Charles II for the development discouraged opposition. The grant by Charles of the freehold of the new square and other adjacent property to trustees for the Earl of St Albans was made on 1 April 1665. A ground-rent of £80 per annum was reserved. The Earl of St Albans built his own townhouse, St Albans House (later the site of Norfolk House), on the square at a cost of £15,000. He also reserved land and £7,000 for the construction of a parish church and churchyard, St James's Church, Piccadilly, on the south side of what is now Piccadilly.

The surrounding streets, including Jermyn Street, King Street, Duke Street St James's and Charles II Street, were completed soon afterwards, an area which would become called St James's. St Albans market was built on a site later cleared for the construction of Regent Street and Waterloo Place. It was a grand design in itself, and from its inspiration grew the whole of the West End of London, so much so that the Survey of London acknowledges Henry Jermyn as the 'Founder of the West End'. In the 1660s he also owned Soho Fields, of which he leased 19 out of the 22 acres (89,000 m2) to Joseph Girle, who was granted permission to develop the land. In August 1674, further grants of freehold land were unsuccessfully sought on behalf of St Albans.

== Personal life ==
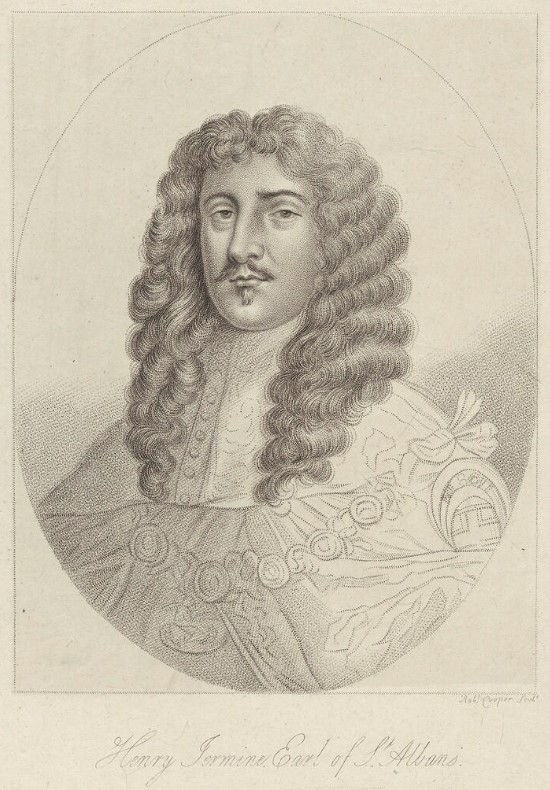
Henry Jermyn, Earl of St Albans (engraving by Richard Cooper, the elder)

He was a friend and patron of Abraham Cowley and Sir William Davenant, who had both acted as his agent and secretary. The 1636 play The Platonick Lovers was dedicated to him by Davenant. Magalotti wrote that St Albans was "an extremely handsome young man, and for that reason was always pleasing to the ladies". He was much addicted to gambling, which was a very popular pastime in his era, and he had several romances at court. His entry in the 1911 Encyclopædia Britannica described him as a "man of dissolute morals". He was lampooned and fiercely mocked in Andrew Marvell's Last Instructions to a Painter (1667), which targeted St Albans' reputation for corruption and his aging, heavy physique. His great rival and critic, Hyde, described him as a "flatterer" who "enjoyed the greatest plenty and pomp" and "loves his country... but would give it up to be made greater any where else".

In 1660 he became one of the original financial investors and charter members of the Royal African Company established by James, Duke of York.

Gossip which the historian Henry Hallam accepted as authentic, but which is supported by no real evidence, asserted that Jermyn was secretly married to Queen Henrietta Maria during their exile in France. James William Edmund Doyle's 1886 Official baronage of England records St Albans as having privately married Queen Dowager Henrietta Maria. It was further rumoured during Jermyn's lifetime that he may have been the true father of at least one of her children, even perhaps of Charles II himself. The Domestic State Papers for 13 August 1660 contain a report by Capt. Francis Robinson of Nathaniel Angelo, a Windsor clergyman, asserting that "all the royal children were Jermyn's bastards."

=== Death and legacy ===
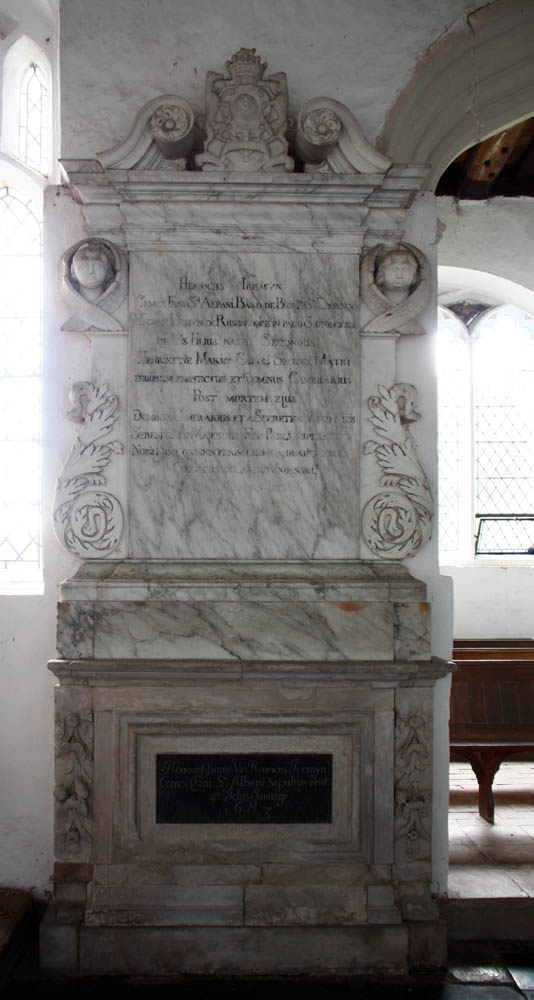
The memorial to Lord St Albans in the church of St Nicholas, Rushbrooke

By September 1683, John Evelyn's Diary recorded that St Albans was "so blind that he could not see to take his meat". St Albans died at his house in St James's Square in January 1684. At his own request, he was buried with his ancestors at the church of St Nicholas, Rushbrooke. An elegant classical tomb was erected to his memory in the south chancel wall of the church.

As he was unmarried without a legitimate heir, the earldom of St Albans became extinct at his death, while the barony of Jermyn of St Edmundsbury passed by special remainder, together with his most of his property, to his nephew Thomas Jermyn (1633–1703). After the latter's death, the title and estates passed to Thomas's brother, Henry, Lord Dover (1636–1708), who had been St Albans' protégé at court. The nephews also inherited £60,000 in debts amassed by St Albans. His illegitimate daughter with Eleanor Villiers, also called Eleanor, married a sugar planter from Jamaica, Philip Dakins, and died in London in 1694. In January 1684, immediately after St Albans' death, Charles II granted Jermyn's territorial designation to one of his illegitimate sons, Charles Beauclerk, as the first Duke of St Albans.

The alleged romance between Lord St Albans and Henrietta Maria is the subject of a 2011 novel, Cavalier Queen, by Fiona Mountain.

== Citations ==
Parliament of England
Preceded by Sir Thomas Stafford; Charles Berkeley	Member of Parliament for Bodmin; 1625–1626; With: Robert Caesar 1625; Sir Richard Weston 1626	Succeeded by Sir Robert Killigrew; Humphrey Nicholls
Preceded by Edward Bridgeman; Thomas Stanley	Member of Parliament for Liverpool; 1628–1629; With: John Newdigate	Parliament suspended until 1640
Vacant Parliament suspended since 1629	Member of Parliament for Corfe Castle; 1640; With: Thomas Jermyn	Succeeded by Sir Francis Windebank; Giles Green
Preceded by Sir Thomas Jermyn; John Godbolt	Member of Parliament for Bury St Edmunds; 1640–1643; With: Thomas Jermyn	Succeeded by Sir William Spring, Bt; Sir Thomas Barnardiston
Political offices
Preceded by The Earl of Manchester	Lord Chamberlain; 1671–1674	Succeeded by The Earl of Arlington
Peerage of England
New creation	Earl of St Albans; 1660–1684	Extinct
New creation	Baron Jermyn of St Edmundsbury; 1643–1684	Succeeded by Thomas Jermyn
