= Henry Jermyn, 1st Baron Dover =

English courtier and favourite of James II (1636–1708)

The Right Honourable The Lord Dover PC
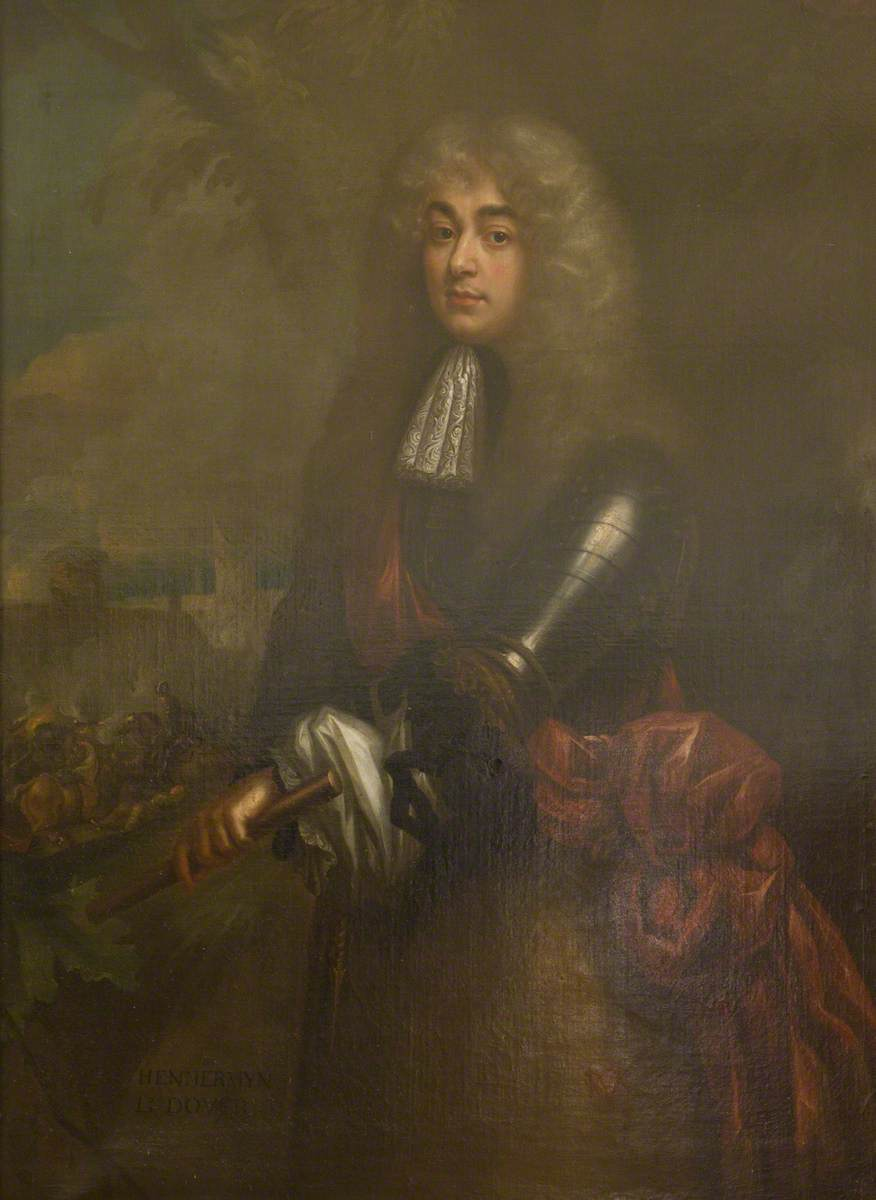
- Henry Jermyn, 1st Baron Dover
- Born: c.1636 Rushbrooke Hall, Suffolk
- Died: 6 April 1708; Cheveley Park, Cambridgeshire
- Burial place: Bruges, Belgium
- Spouse: Judith Poley (m.1675)
- Relatives: Thomas Jermyn (father); Lord Jermyn (brother); Lord St Albans (uncle)
- Military career
- Allegiance: English Royalists (before 1660); England (1660–1688); Jacobites (1688–1690)
- Commands: Lieutenant-General of the Royal Guard
- Conflicts: Franco-Spanish War; The Fronde; Anglo-Spanish War; Williamite War in Ireland

Henry Jermyn, 3rd Baron Jermyn and 1st Baron Dover, 1st Jacobite Earl of Dover PC (c. 1636 – 6 April 1708) was an English courtier, peer and favourite of James II.

Jermyn was born into a Royalist gentry family shortly before the English Civil War. During the exile of the royal family and after the Stuart Restoration in 1660, he was a member of the court of Charles II of England thanks to the influence of his powerful uncle, Henry Jermyn, 1st Earl of St Albans. At court he surpassed his uncle in reputation for profligacy and was the sometime lover of Anne Hyde, Lady Castlemaine, Lady Shrewsbury, Frances Jennings and possibly Mary, Princess Royal and Princess of Orange.

A convert to Roman Catholicism, he was a childhood friend of James, Duke of York and received many honours upon James' accession to the throne in 1685. He remained loyal to James after the Glorious Revolution in 1688 and fought as a Jacobite during the Williamite War in Ireland, but in 1690 he pledged his loyalty to William and Mary. He was referred to in the Memoirs of the Count de Grammont as "Little Jermyn" and "the favoured of Venus and the desperate duellist".

== Early life and family ==
Jermyn was the second son of Thomas Jermyn, of Rushbrooke, Suffolk, who died in 1659, and his wife Rebecca Rodway, who married secondly Henry Brouncker, 3rd Viscount Brouncker. Throughout Jermyn's childhood his family, who owned large estates in Suffolk, were ardently loyal to the House of Stuart. Jermyn's father, an equerry to Charles I, supported the king during the Civil War and spent a period in exile during the Commonwealth of England. His grandfather, Thomas Jermyn, had served as Comptroller of the Household to Charles I, while Jermyn's uncle, Lord St Albans, was a close associate of Henrietta Maria of France during her period of refuge in France from 1644. Jermyn was raised as a Protestant within the established Church of England.

== Courtier under Charles II ==
Jermyn joined his father in exile from England after 1645. Lord St Albans, who was secretary to the Queen Dowager until her death in 1669, obtained places at the exiled royal court for his nephews, Jermyn and his elder brother Thomas. Jermyn was given a position as a page in the household of James, Duke of York, despite the strong disapproval of Charles II. The prince and Jermyn became firm friends. Jermyn was a constant member of James' retinue during the prince's military service on the continent, first in the French Royal Army during The Fronde and then in the Franco-Spanish War. Jermyn fought for the English Royalists at the Battle of the Dunes in 1658, during which he was injured when his horse was shot out from under him.

By the mid-1650s, Jermyn had gained a reputation for promiscuity and profligacy. Described as "very handomse", "very athletic, an accomplished swordsman and an enthusiastic soldier", he was also a life-long gambler. Thomas Babington Macaulay wrote that by 1685, Jermyn had "been distinguished more than twenty years before by his vagrant amours and desperate duels". According to rumour, his most notable conquest was Charles's widowed sister Mary of Orange, whom he met several times during the period of exile, and there were even stories that they were secretly married on her deathbed in 1660. Historians generally discount these rumours, but Charles II took them seriously, and reprimanded his sister for her lack of discretion, but with no effect; Mary sharply reminded her brother that his own love affairs hardly entitled him to judge her moral conduct. Charles was especially angry because of the similar rumours that Jermyn's uncle Lord St Albans had secretly married the Queen Dowager. As John Phillipps Kenyon remarked, "to have one Jermyn as an in-law would have been bad enough; to have two would be intolerable". At this time, Jermyn also had a relationship with Anne Hyde, who was serving as a maid of honour to Mary in Breda.

=== Restoration of the monarchy ===
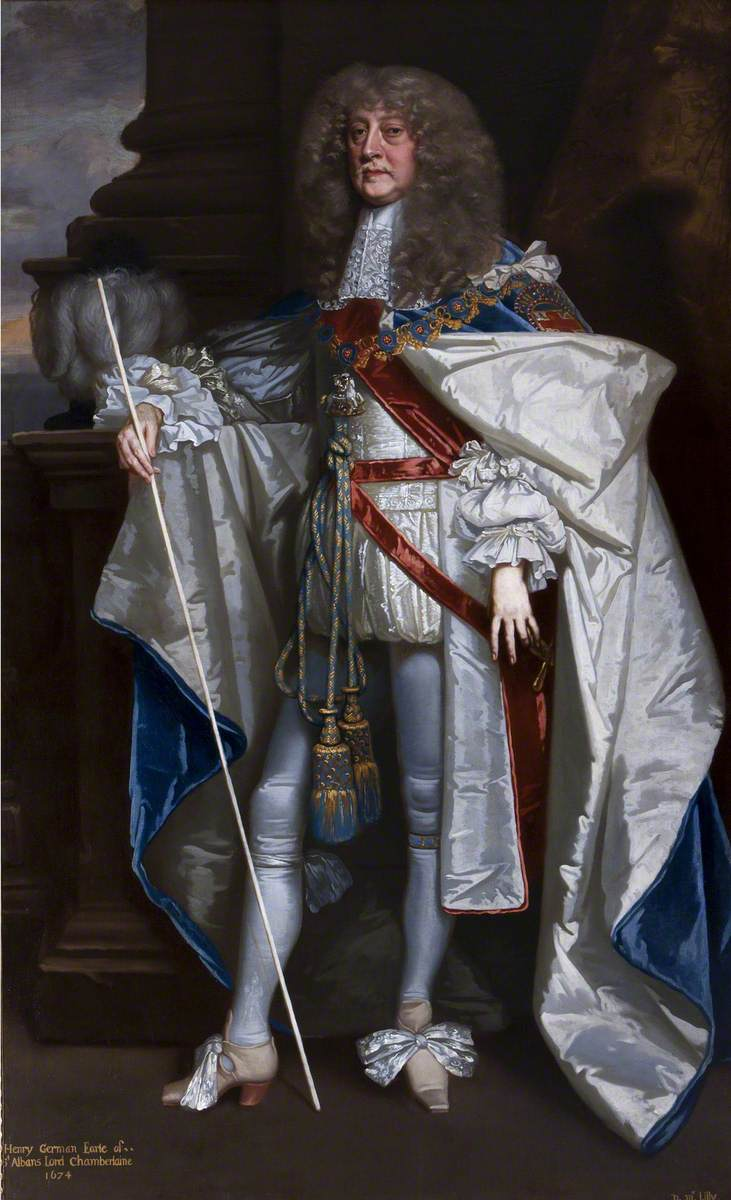
Jermyn's influential uncle, the Royalist courtier Lord St Albans

Jermyn was a young man, aged 24, at the time of the restoration of Charles to the throne in 1660. James appointed him his master of horse and he rode in the royal retinue at Charles' coronation on 22 April 1661, despite the disapproval of Lord Clarendon. In May 1662, he escorted Catherine of Braganza through the English Channel to Portsmouth for her marriage to the king.

The restoration, however, did not lead to a change in Jermyn's rakish behaviour. In a notorious duel with Colonel Thomas Howard, (younger brother of Charles Howard, 1st Earl of Carlisle), in August 1662, which Samuel Pepys refers to in his diary, Jermyn was left for dead. He recovered, but his second Giles Rawlins was killed by Howard's second Colonel Carey Dillon, later the 5th Earl of Roscommon. The cause of the dispute is said to have been the rivalry between Jermyn and Howard for the affections of Lady Shrewsbury, who was notorious for the number of her lovers.

Elizabeth, Countess de Gramont reportedly resisted Jermyn's attempts to seduce her. Having previously offended the king by courting his sister Mary, Jermyn proceeded to give further offence by having an affair with Lady Castlemaine, by then the chief royal mistress, and in December 1662 he was banished from court for six months. In 1667, Pepys recorded that King Charles was "jealous of Jermyn" because Lady Castlemaine was in love with him, and that she was furious with Jermyn because he was allegedly planning to marry Mary, Countess of Falmouth and Dorset (another of Charles' mistresses).

In 1665 Jermyn, with others, was given a large grant of overflowed lands in Ireland by the king. In June 1665, Jermyn was present at the Battle of Lowestoft on the Royal Charles alongside the Duke of York. Jermyn's cousin and longtime companion, Charles Berkeley, 1st Earl of Falmouth, was killed by a Dutch cannonball during the battle. On 20 January 1666, Jermyn was appointed to be a captain in a militia company, the Duke of Richmond's horse. In September that year, Jermyn joined other courtiers and members of the royal family in efforts to extinguish the Great Fire of London. In 1667, he joined the Duke of York in ordering the response to the Raid on the Medway.

Jermyn's uncle was made Lord Chamberlain in 1672, which seemed to assure his position at court. However, at some point in the early 1670s, Jermyn converted to Roman Catholicism, following James' own conversion in 1669. As a result, following the passing of the Test Act 1673, Jermyn was forced to resign his position in James' household and was granted a conciliatory pension of £500. In 1673, the king had to intercede to prevent Jermyn fighting a duel with Lord Mulgrave.

In around 1670, he took up residence at Cheveley Park, near Newmarket. By 1681, Jermyn's uncle had rebuilt the house in the baroque style and Jermyn commissioned Jan Siberechts to decorate much of the interior. The principle rooms of the house were filled with fine paintings, including one by Rubens, and portraits of members of the royal family. He also had a Catholic chapel constructed at the house. Jermyn hosted extravagant parties at Cheveley, especially when the royal court was attending Newmarket Racecourse, and he is known to have entertained the Duke of York and John Evelyn at the house.

On 17 April 1675 he married Judith Poley (1654–1726), daughter of Sir Edmund Poley of Badley, Suffolk. She was described by Hugh Tootell as "a lady of a singular good character". The couple had one daughter, who died young.

== Favourite of James II ==
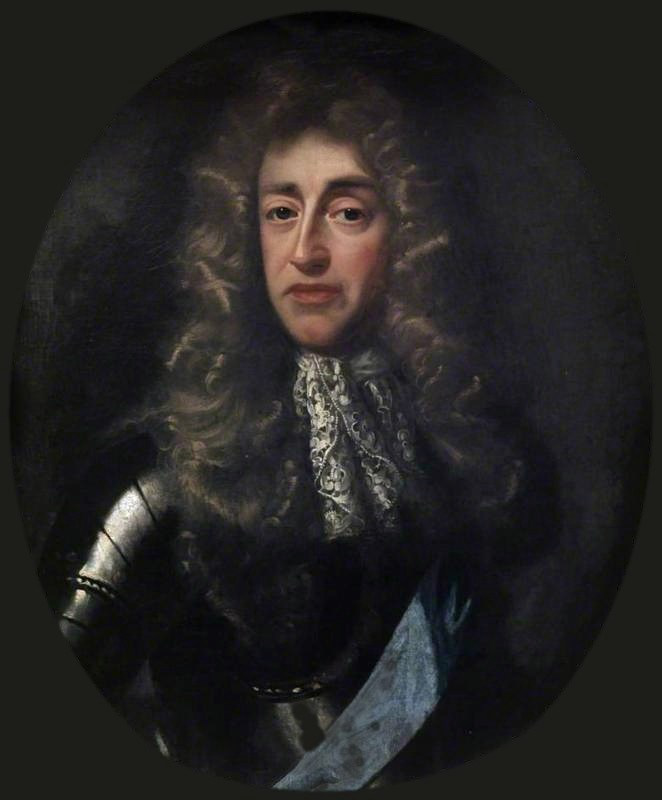
James II, with whom Jermyn was closely associated between the 1640s and 1690

Upon the accession of the Duke of York to the throne as James II on 6 February 1685, Jermyn remained one of his closest friends and advisors. Jermyn was the first of James' associates to be raised to the Peerage of England when, on 13 May 1685, he was made Baron Dover in the county of Kent. The new Lord Dover was able to return to court as a Gentleman of the Bedchamber to the king, where he became an ally of the Earl of Castlemaine, Ignatius White and the Earl of Tyrconnell. This group collectively influenced James to stay true to his Catholic faith in the face of growing criticism from parliament.

In May 1686, James created a troop in the Life Guards (4th Troop) specifically for Catholics and made Lord Dover its colonel. The same year James appointed him Lieutenant-General of the Royal Guard. However, rather than create a new corps of English Catholic army officers loyal to James, to help cover his gambling debts Dover sold half of the available commissions to refugee Huguenot gentlemen. On 17 August 1686, Dover was one of the first Catholics to be admitted to the Privy Council of England since the reign of Mary I. Shortly afterwards he was given the position of Lord Lieutenant of Cambridgeshire; the first Catholic to be appointed a lord lieutenant.

On 4 January 1687 Dover was appointed a Commissioner of the Treasury to serve alongside Stephen Fox, Lord Godolphin and Lord Belasyse. However, the appointment of a known gambler ("a man of notorious incompetence") to the role was met with some ridicule. The same year, he was among those Catholic officials who were exempted from taking their oaths of office. In 1688 he was made High Steward of Kingston upon Hull. Despite his debauched private life, as a politician, he was at times a moderating influence on the king. He strongly advised James against repealing the Act of Settlement 1662. While his loyalty was never in question at this stage, he was not afraid to speak his mind to James, or to disagree with him in public.

== Revolution and war in Ireland ==
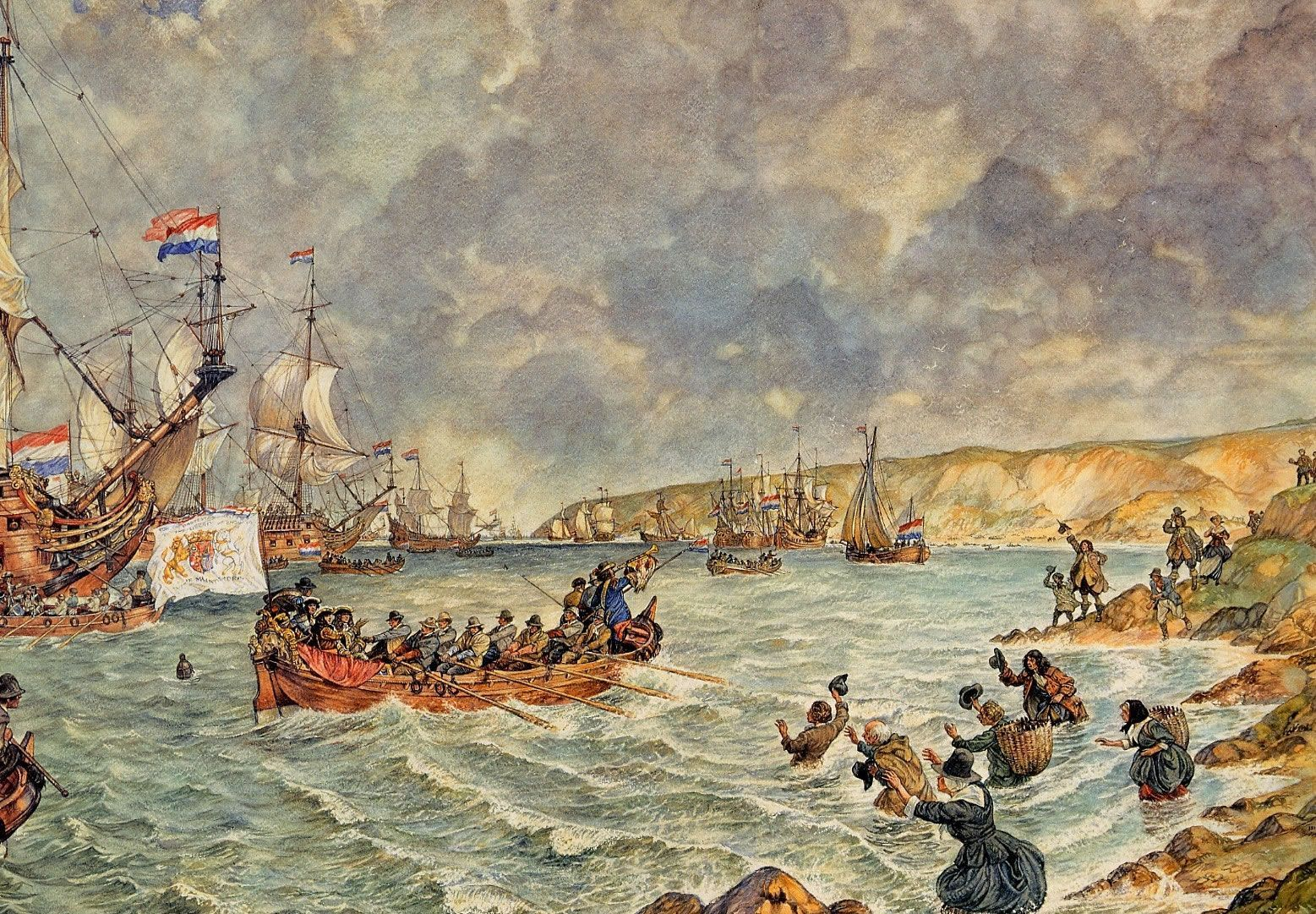
The Glorious Revolution of 1688 precipitated a dramatic reversal in Lord Dover's fortunes

At the Glorious Revolution in 1688, Dover remained loyal to James, initially staying with the king in London. James appointed him Governor of Portsmouth in November 1688, with the task of securing the port for James and escorting the young Prince of Wales to France. The plan was foiled when Lord Dartmouth refused to follow Dover's orders to prepare a yacht; the prince was hurriedly returned to London and later escaped England with his mother.

Dover subsequently followed James into exile in France, his house at Cheveley Park having been attacked by a Protestant mob. He landed at Calais on 20 January 1689 with Lady Dover and George Douglas, 1st Earl of Dumbarton. Dover accompanied James when he landed in Ireland in March 1689 to launch the military effort to reclaim the throne. On 20 June 1689 he was included in the act of attainder passed by the English parliament, and ordered to give himself up by a certain day. In July 1689 the deposed sovereign created him Baron Jermyn of Royston, Baron Ipswich, Viscount Cheveley and Earl of Dover in the Jacobite Peerage. These titles were not recognised by the English government, although Dover became generally known as the Earl of Dover. During the conflict, James despatched Dover on missions to Dublin, and on one occasion to France to petition Louis XIV for greater French assistance. A lieutenant-general in James' Jacobite army and commander of the Gards du Corps, Dover assured the Marquis de Louvois that the war in Ireland could be won with French support. While returning to Ireland in November 1689 on a French warship alongside Ignatius White, he narrowly escaped capture off the Isles of Scilly.

Dover subsequently found himself increasingly unpopular with both James' Irish and French supporters. Having been appointed Intendant-General at Cork, he quarrelled with his former friend, the Duke of Lauzun, and James threw blame at Dover for the poor reception of French reinforcements which landed in Ireland in March 1690. When the French troops arrived in Dublin, Lauzun made a formal complaint to James about Dover. The French Marquis de Sourches expressed that Lord Dover should have been executed as a traitor for his "inexcusable incompetence and neglect of duty".

His friendship with James over, Dover resigned in June 1690 and recommended that James should make peace with William III and join the alliance against France. This only served to worsen the relationship between Dover and the deposed king. Dover petitioned Tyrconnell for a passport to leave Ireland, but Tyrconnell refused. On 19 June, Dover entered secret negotiations with Percy Kirke. Dover went to Waterford and eventually managed to procure passage out of Ireland. He fled to Bruges where he lived in poverty for a time, before deciding to return to England and make his submission to William III in September 1691; he "threw himself at William's feat, promised to live peaceably, and was graciously reassured that he had nothing to fear". In November he was granted a pardon by the king. Nonetheless, in February 1692 the House of Commons of England voted by 119 votes to 112 against a clause proposed by Viscount Savage that Dover's attainder should be overturned.

== Later life ==
Despite legally remaining an outlaw, in 1698 the king granted him a special licence to remain in England. Dover spent the rest of his life living quietly at his London townhouse or at his country estate at Cheveley Park, where he continued to entertain guests including Charles de Saint-Évremond. He succeeded his brother Thomas as 3rd Baron Jermyn in 1703 and was able to live off his inheritance. He died at Cheveley on 6 April 1708. In accordance with his will, his body was moved to the English Convent and Friary of the Discalced Carmelites in Bruges, where he was buried in an elaborate Catholic ceremony on 24 May 1708. As he left no children by his wife, Judith, his titles became extinct at his death.

Cheveley was left to his wife for the remainder of her life, while his other property was inherited by the family of his nieces, Hon. Merolina Jermyn, Lady Spring, wife of Sir Thomas Spring, 3rd Baronet, and Hon. Mary Jermyn, Lady Davers, wife of Sir Robert Davers, 2nd Baronet (an ancestor of Frederick Hervey, 1st Marquess of Bristol). Following Lady Dover's death in 1726, the Cheveley estate and several London properties were inherited by Dover's great-nephew, Sir Jermyn Davers, 4th Baronet.

Dover Street in London's Mayfair was named after Lord Dover after he participated in a development syndicate led by Sir Thomas Bond, 1st Baronet in 1683.

Honorary titles
Vacant Title last held by The Earl of Ailesbury	Lord Lieutenant of Cambridgeshire; 1686–1688	Succeeded by The Earl of Bedford
Peerage of England
New creation	— TITULAR — Earl of Dover; Jacobite peerage 1689–1708	Extinct
Preceded by Thomas Jermyn	Baron Jermyn of St Edmundsbury; 1703–1708	Extinct
New title	Baron Dover; 1685–1708	Extinct
