= Thomas Jermyn, 2nd Baron Jermyn =

English politician and peer (1633–1703)

Thomas Jermyn The Lord Jermyn, 2nd Baron Jermyn
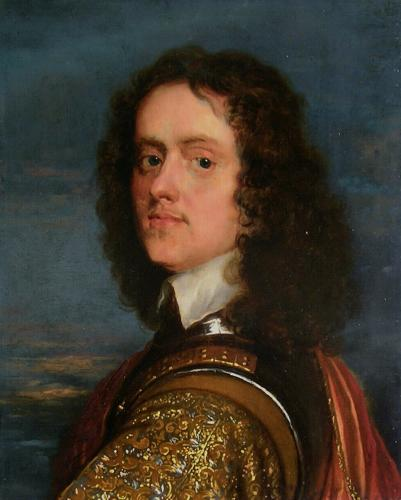
- Thomas Jermyn, from a portrait by John Weesop
- Born: 10 November 1633; Rushbrooke Hall, Suffolk
- Died: 1 April 1703 (aged 69); Spring Gardens, Westminster
- Spouse: Mary Merry (m. 1659)
- Children: 5
- Parent(s): Thomas Jermyn; Rebecca Rodway

Thomas Jermyn, 2nd Baron Jermyn (10 November 1633 – 1 April 1703) was an English politician who sat in the House of Commons from 1679 until he inherited a peerage in 1684.

== Biography ==
Jermyn was the son of Thomas Jermyn (d.1659) of Rushbrooke Hall in Suffolk, by his wife Rebecca Rodway, the heiress of William Rodway. He served as a captain of foot in Jersey from 1661 to 1679. From 1662 to 1679, he was Lieutenant Governor of Jersey. In 1673, Jermyn was elected as a Member of Parliament for Bury St Edmunds in Suffolk. In 1674, he was appointed a justice of the peace for the county. In parliament, Jermyn voted against the first exclusion bill during the Exclusion Crisis. He continued to oppose exclusion in subsequent votes, but he made no recorded speeches and was not appointed to any committees. Jermyn held the seat until 1684, when, by special remainder, he became Baron Jermyn on the death of his uncle Henry Jermyn, 1st Earl of St Albans and was elevated to the House of Lords. In 1684, he also inherited the position of Governor of Jersey, holding the role until his death. Between 1685 and 1687, he was a captain of the 12th Regiment of Foot.

Despite his opposition to exclusion, Jermyn was a supporter of the Glorious Revolution in 1688 and he signed the Association of 1696. He died at his townhouse at Spring Gardens in 1703. He died without surviving male issue as his son, also Thomas, had been killed aged 16 by the falling of a ship's mast in 1692. He was succeeded in his title by his brother, the former Jacobite, Henry Jermyn, 1st Baron Dover. Jermyn's estate, valued at £15,000 per year, was divided among his four surviving adult daughters.

== Marriage and issue ==
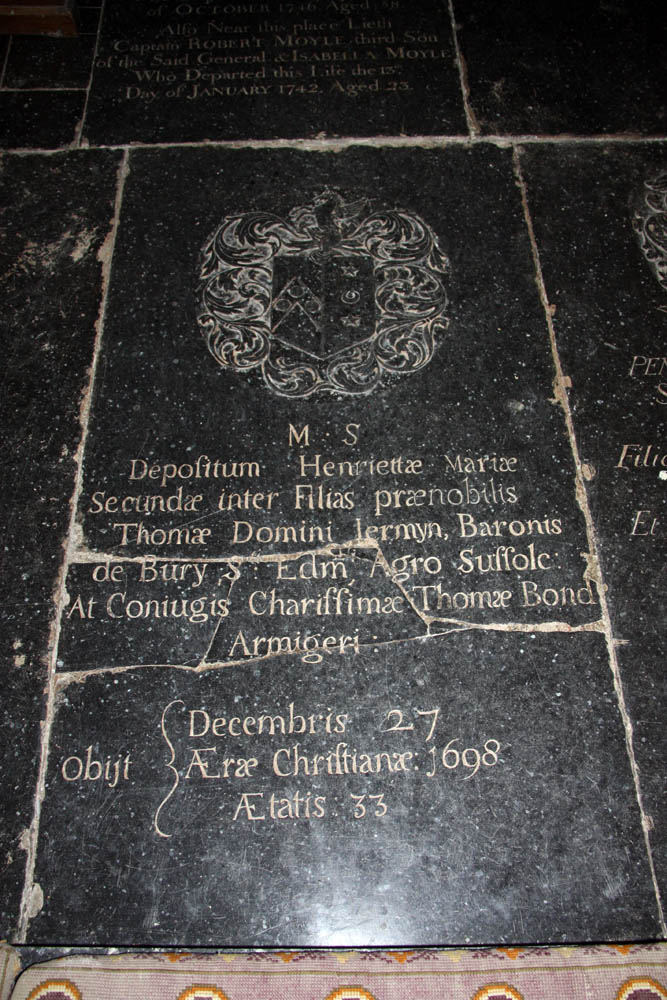
The gravestone of his daughter, Henrietta Maria, who married Thomas Bond

In 1659 he married Mary Merry, a daughter of Henry Merry of Barton Blount, Derbyshire, by whom he had five daughters, four of whom survived him and became his co-heiresses:

- Mary Jermyn (1658–1722), who married Sir Robert Davers, 2nd Baronet.
- Henrietta Maria Jermyn (1665 – 27 December 1698), who married Thomas Bond. Her ledger stone survives in the Church of St. Nicholas, Rushbrooke, Suffolk.
- Delariviera Jermyn (1666–1708), who married Sir Symonds D'Ewes, 3rd Baronet of Stowlangtoft, Suffolk. Her ledger stone survives in St George's Church, Stowlangtoft.
- Penelope Jermyn (1670–1728), who married Grey James Grove.
- Merelina Jermyn (1673–1727), who married, firstly, Sir Thomas Spring, 3rd Baronet, and, secondly Sir William Gage, 2nd Baronet.

Parliament of England
Preceded by Sir John Duncombe; William Duncombe	Member of Parliament for Bury St Edmunds; 1679–1684; With: Sir Thomas Hervey	Succeeded by Sir Thomas Hervey; William Crofts
Peerage of England
Preceded by Henry Jermyn	Baron Jermyn of St Edmundsbury; 1684–1703	Succeeded by Henry Jermyn
