= Thomas Jermyn (1604–1659) =

English politician

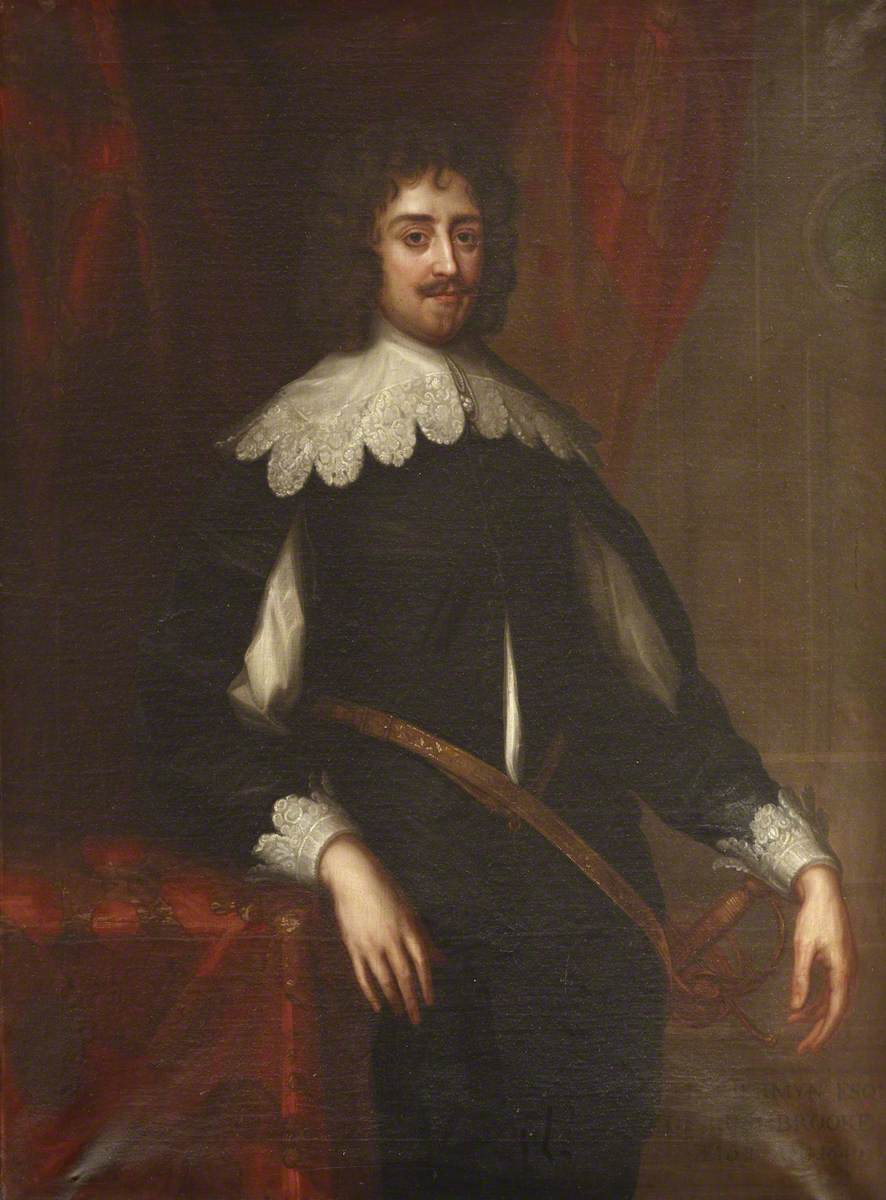
- A portrait Thomas Jermyn, circa 1700 (after an earlier painting of 1640)
- Born: March 1604
- Died: 11 November 1659 (aged 55)
- Spouse: Rebecca Rodway (m.1629)
- Issue: Thomas Jermyn; Henry Jermyn
- Father: Sir Thomas Jermyn
- Mother: Catherine Killigrew
- Occupation: Courtier and Royalist politician

Thomas Jermyn (March 1604 – 11 November 1659) was an English courtier and politician who sat in the House of Commons for various seats between 1625 and 1644. He supported the Royalist cause in the English Civil War.

== Early life ==
Jermyn was the son of Sir Thomas Jermyn of Rushbrooke, Suffolk and his wife Catherine Killigrew, daughter of Sir William Killigrew. He was born in Hanworth, the seat of the Killigrews, and raised at the Jermyn seat of Rushbrooke Hall. He was admitted at Emmanuel College, Cambridge on 13 June 1622, and was awarded BA in 1626 and MA in 1629. Through his father and grandparents, Jermyn had close connections to the Stuart royal court. In 1623, he was made a page in the service of Prince Charles, and attended on the Prince during his Spanish journey that year alongside his father.

== Career ==
In 1624, Jermyn was elected Member of Parliament for Bere Alston under the patronage of Lord Mountjoy. In 1625 he was elected MP for Leicester. He was subsequently elected MP for Lancaster in 1626 and for Clitheroe in 1628, sitting until 1629 when King Charles I decided to dissolve parliament. In 1626, Jermyn had been appointed as an equerry to the king, and that year he publicly opposed attempts by the Commons to impeach the king's favourite, the Duke of Buckingham. This included accidentally revealing the confidential views of the king’s immediate circle while criticising Dudley Digges, who was leading the attempts to impeach Buckingham.

In April 1640, Jermyn was elected Member of Parliament for Corfe Castle together with his brother Henry Jermyn in the Short Parliament, and in November 1640, the brothers were elected MPs for Bury St Edmunds in the Long Parliament. By 1640, Jermyn was both a justice of the peace and a deputy lieutenant for Suffolk. As the civil war approached in 1642, Jermyn sided with King Charles and in September 1643 the Roundheads officially discharged him from parliament. Jermyn attended the royalist Oxford Parliament in 1644. In January the following year he succeeded to his father's estate, which was ostensibly worth £1,980 a year. However, all of his lands were mortgaged and several of the family's estates were in Parliament-controlled territory; the family manor at Torksey Castle was slighted in 1645. Jermyn went into exile after the eventual royalist defeat in the war. In January 1651, he returned to Suffolk where he lived quietly under The Protectorate until his death in November 1659.

== Marriage and children ==
In 1629, Jermyn married Rebecca Rodway, the daughter and heiress of William Rodway of London. Together they had four sons and four daughters. Jermyn was the father of Thomas Jermyn, who inherited the title of Baron Jermyn from Jermyn's brother Henry in 1684, and of Henry Jermyn, who was a Roman Catholic and became a favourite of James II of England. In 1661, Jermyn's widow married Henry Brouncker, 3rd Viscount Brouncker.

Parliament of England
| Preceded by Thomas Keightley; Sir Thomas Wise | Member of Parliament for Bere Alston; 1624; With: William Strode | Succeeded by Sir Thomas Cheek; William Strode |
| Preceded by Sir Humphrey May | Member of Parliament for Leicester; 1625; With: Sir George Hastings | Succeeded by Sir Humphrey May; Sir George Hastings |
| Preceded by Sir Humphrey May; Sir Thomas Fanshawe | Member of Parliament for Lancaster; 1626; With: Sir Thomas Fanshawe | Succeeded by Sir Thomas Fanshawe; Francis Bindlosse |
| Preceded by Ralph Asheton; Christopher Hatton | Member of Parliament for Clitheroe; 1628–1629; With: William Newell | Parliament suspended until 1640 |
| Parliament suspended since 1629 | Member of Parliament for Corfe Castle; 1640; With: Henry Jermyn | Succeeded by Sir Francis Windebank; Giles Green |
| Preceded by Sir Thomas Jermyn; John Godbolt | Member of Parliament for Bury St Edmunds; 1640–1644; With: Henry Jermyn 1640–1643 | Succeeded by Sir William Spring, Bt; Sir Thomas Barnardiston |
