= Robert Jermyn (1539–1614) =

English landowner and politician (1539–1614)

Sir Robert Jermyn DL (1539 – 1614) was an English landowner and politician, of strongly reformist views in religion, who sat in the House of Commons at various times between 1584 and 1589.

== Biography ==
Jermyn was the eldest surviving son of Sir Ambrose Jermyn and his first wife Anne Heveningham, daughter of George Heveningham. He may have been a student of Corpus Christi College, Cambridge in 1550. He was admitted to the Middle Temple in 1561. In 1577, he succeeded to his father's Suffolk estates and seat at Rushbrooke Hall, Suffolk's largest moated Tudor mansion, having already constructed Torksey Castle in c. 1560. Around this time he was brought onto the commission of the peace. He was knighted by Queen Elizabeth I in 1578 and hosted the Queen at Rushbrooke during her visit to Suffolk the same year. He was appointed High Sheriff of Suffolk for 1579.

Jermyn's extreme Protestant views saw him removed from the judicial bench from 1583 until 1593. During this enforced absence he served as the junior Member of Parliament (MP) for Suffolk in the parliament of 1584 and as the senior MP in 1586. He then served as MP for East Looe from 1588 to 1589. He was also a deputy lieutenant and Custos Rotulorum of Suffolk from before 1594 to 1614.

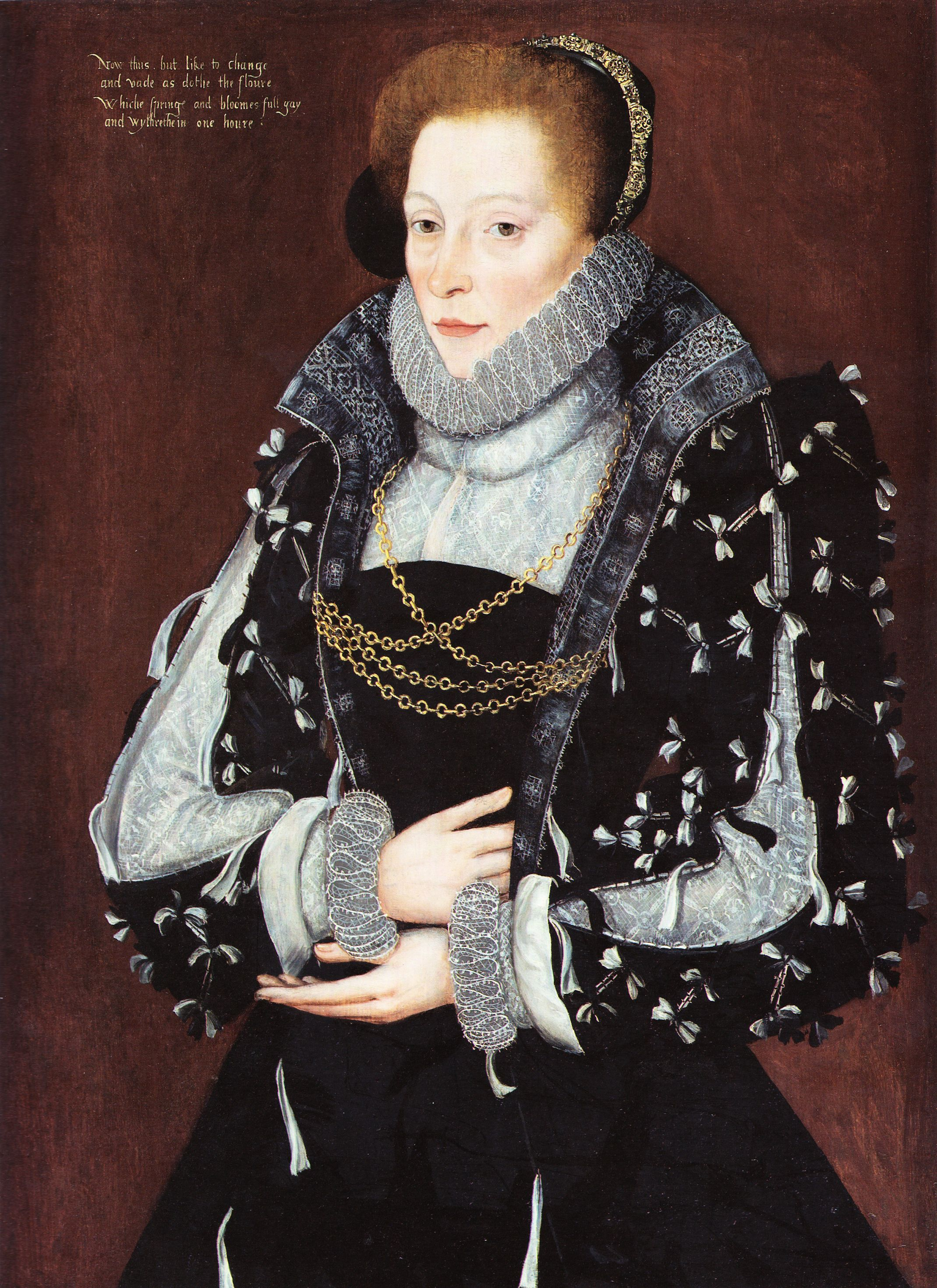
His wife, Judith Blagge, Lady Jermyn of Boxted Hall, by George Gower

Jermyn died in 1614, aged 74 or 75, and was buried at Rushbrooke.

Jermyn married Judith Blagge, the daughter of George Blagge, Suffolk and had at least two sons, including Sir Thomas Jermyn, and five daughters. His daughter Susan married Sir William Hervey and they had sons John and Thomas Hervey.

== Heraldry ==
Sir Robert gave a collection of books, works by John Calvin, to the library of St James's church at Bury St Edmunds, founded in 1595. Thirteen of these survive, bearing his donative inscription, and displaying his heraldic arms stamped on the covers.

The arms are shown as follows, quarterly of nine:
1: (Jermyn). A crescent between two mullets in pale;
2: (Rushbrook). A fess between three roses;
3: (Heveningham). Per cross a bordure engrailed a crescent for difference;
4: (Jarvill). Paly of six;
5: (Gissing). On a bend three eagles displayed;
6: (Redesham). Semy of fleurs de lys;
7: (Reppes). Three chevrons;
8: (Burgon). A talbot passant;
9: (Bozun). Three bird bolts point downwards in fess.
Crest: A talbot statant ducally gorged.
