= Thomas Hervey (landowner) =

English politician (1624–1694)

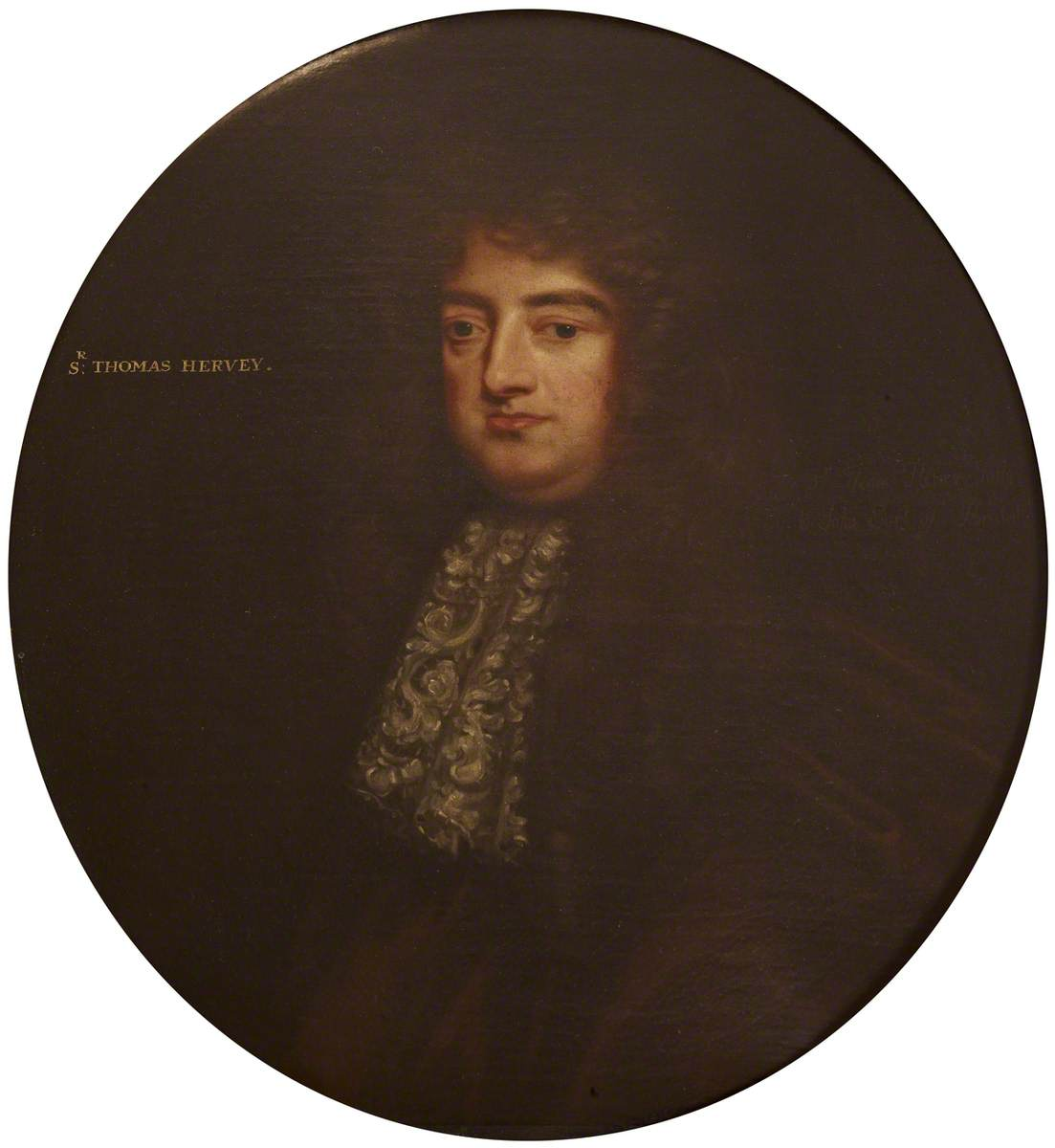
Hervey by Henry Peart the elder, 1690

Sir Thomas Hervey (1625 – 27 May 1694) was an English Commissioner of the Royal Navy, landed gentleman, and Member of Parliament for Bury St Edmunds.

== Life ==
Hervey was born in 1625, the third son of Sir William Hervey (1585–1660) of Ickworth, by his marriage in 1612 to Susan Jermyn, a daughter of Sir Robert Jermyn.

On 3 April 1641, aged fifteen, Hervey was admitted to Pembroke College, Cambridge, as a pensioner, but did not take a degree. He became a Justice of the Peace for Suffolk, an Alderman of the corporation of Bury St Edmunds, and from 1664 to 1668 was a Commissioner of the Royal Navy.

In his role at the Navy Board, Hervey held a political appointment and in practice did very little, like the other Commissioners leaving the actual work to their Secretary, Samuel Pepys. By 1665, Hervey had been knighted. In his diary for 7 June 1665, Pepys recorded a merry dinner at the Dolphin Tavern with Hervey, Sir John Mennes, and Lord Brouncker, saying of it "very merry we were, Sir Thomas Harvy being a very drolle." On 10 February 1666, as the Great Plague of London was abating, Pepys noted "This day comes first Sir Thomas Harvy after the plague, having been out of towne all this while. He was coldly received by us..." On 7 November, Pepys wrote dismissively of Hervey "... but a coxcombe he is and will never be better in the business of the Navy". When Hervey resigned his commission, Charles II gave him a generous royal bounty.

On 18 January 1679, with the death of his childless elder brother John Hervey (born 1616), Hervey inherited the Ickworth estate, and the same year became one of the two members of parliament for Bury. With the accession of James II, he was part of the opposition to the new king in parliament.

== Personal life ==
In May 1658, he married Isabella, a daughter of Sir Humphrey May, of Carrow Abbey, Norfolk.

He died on 27 May 1694, aged 68 or 69.

Parliament of England
Preceded by William Duncombe; Sir John Duncombe	Member of Parliament for Bury St Edmunds; 1679–1690; With: Thomas Jermyn (1679-1681); William Crofts (1685–1689); Sir Robert Davers, Bt (1689-1690)	Succeeded by Henry Goldwell; Sir Robert Davers, Bt
