= Marquess of Bristol =

Title in the Peerage of the United Kingdom

Marquessate of Bristol
- Arms of Hervey: Gules, on a Bend Argent, three Trefoils slipped Vert. Crest: An Ounce passant Sable, Bezanté, ducally collared with chain reflexed over the back Or, holding in the dexter paw a Trefoil slipped Vert. Supporters: On either side an Ounce Sable, Bezanté, collared with chain reflexed over the back Or.
- Creation date: 30 July 1826; 200 years ago
- Created by: George IV
- Peerage: Peerage of the United Kingdom
- First holder: Frederick Hervey, 5th Earl of Bristol
- Present holder: Frederick Hervey, 8th Marquess of Bristol
- Heir apparent: Frederick Hervey, Earl Jermyn
- Remainder to: 1st Marquess' heirs male of the body lawfully begotten
- Subsidiary titles: Earl of Bristol; Earl Jermyn; Baron Hervey
- Former seat: Ickworth House
- Motto: JE N'OUBLIERAY JAMAIS (I shall never forget)

Marquess of Bristol is a title in the Peerage of the United Kingdom held by the Hervey family since 1826. The Marquess's subsidiary titles are Earl of Bristol (created 1714), Earl Jermyn, of Horningsheath in the County of Suffolk (1826), and Baron Hervey, of Ickworth in the County of Suffolk (1703). The Hervey barony is in the Peerage of England, the earldom of Bristol in the Peerage of Great Britain and the Jermyn earldom in the Peerage of the United Kingdom. Earl Jermyn is used as courtesy title by the Marquess's eldest son and heir. The Marquess of Bristol also holds the office of Hereditary High Steward of the Liberty of St Edmund (a liberty encompassing the entire former county of West Suffolk). The present holder of these titles is Frederick Hervey (born 19 October 1979), the 8th Marquess and 12th Earl of Bristol.

The Hervey (pronounced "Harvey" (Note: The name is of Frankish origins and means 'warrior and host'.)) family has often been considered unconventional; the 18th-century phrase "When God created the human race, he made men, women and Herveys" is attributed variously to French philosopher Voltaire and to Lady Mary Wortley Montagu. It has been read as a reference to the second Lord Hervey's noted originality and eccentricity, but has been applied to the family throughout the centuries. According to the Dictionary of National Biography, the Hervey family have been described as "active and brave, but reckless and overconfident ... greatly addicted to intrigue ...". Dr Johnson thought them good company: "If you will call a dog Hervey," he said, "I shall love him."

== History ==
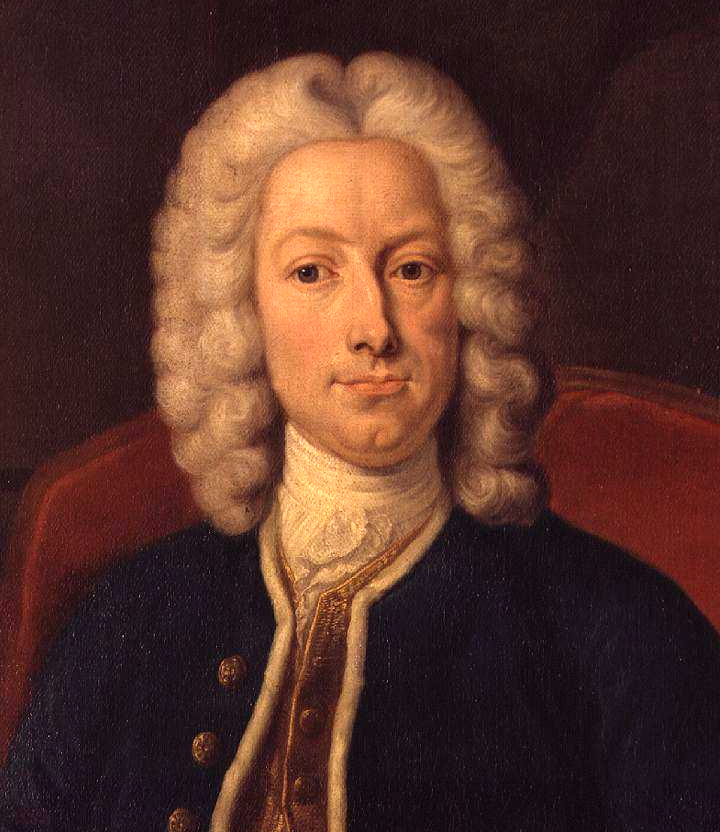
John Hervey, 2nd Baron Hervey.

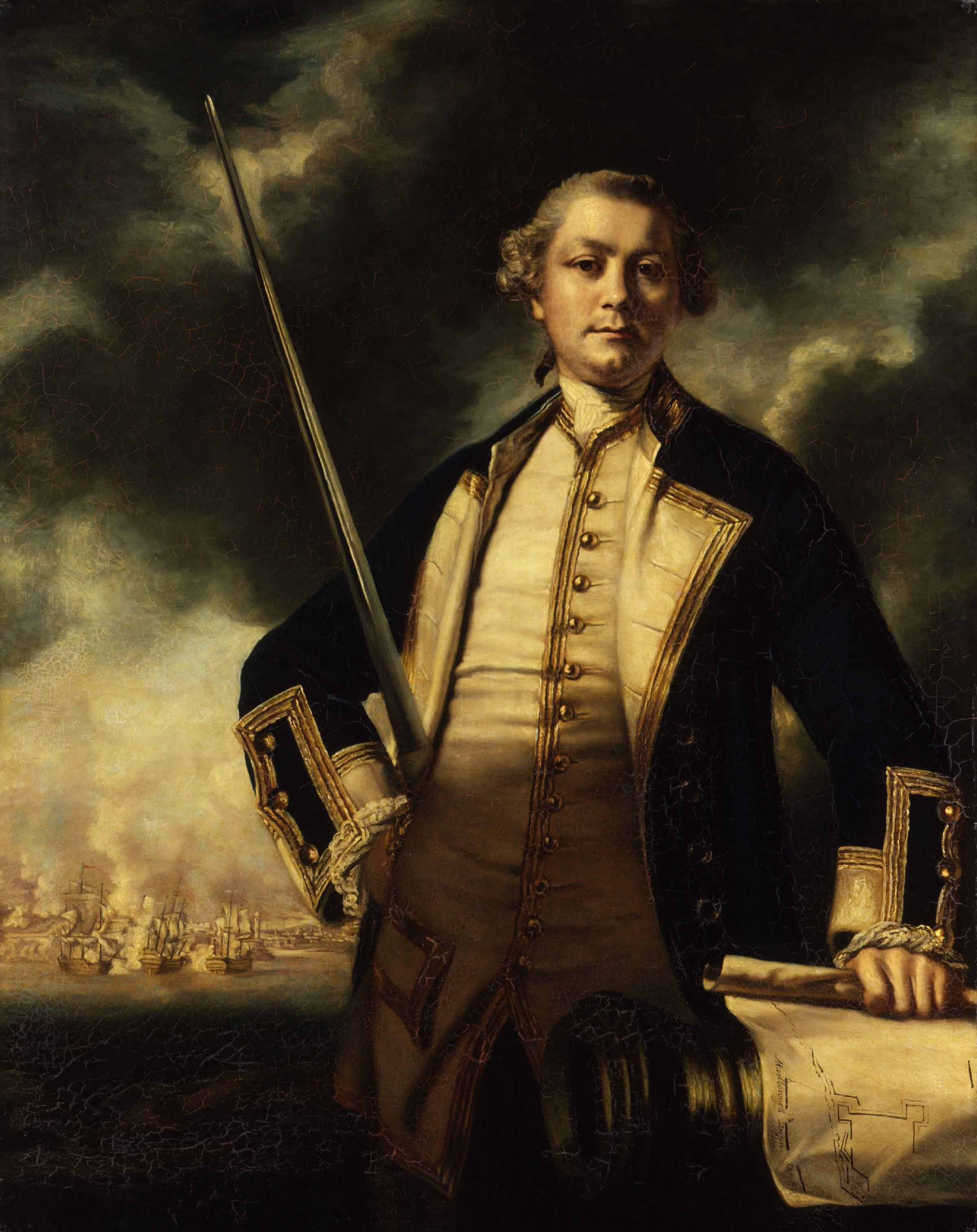
Augustus Hervey, 3rd Earl of Bristol.

Frederick Hervey, 4th Earl of Bristol and Lord Bishop of Derry.

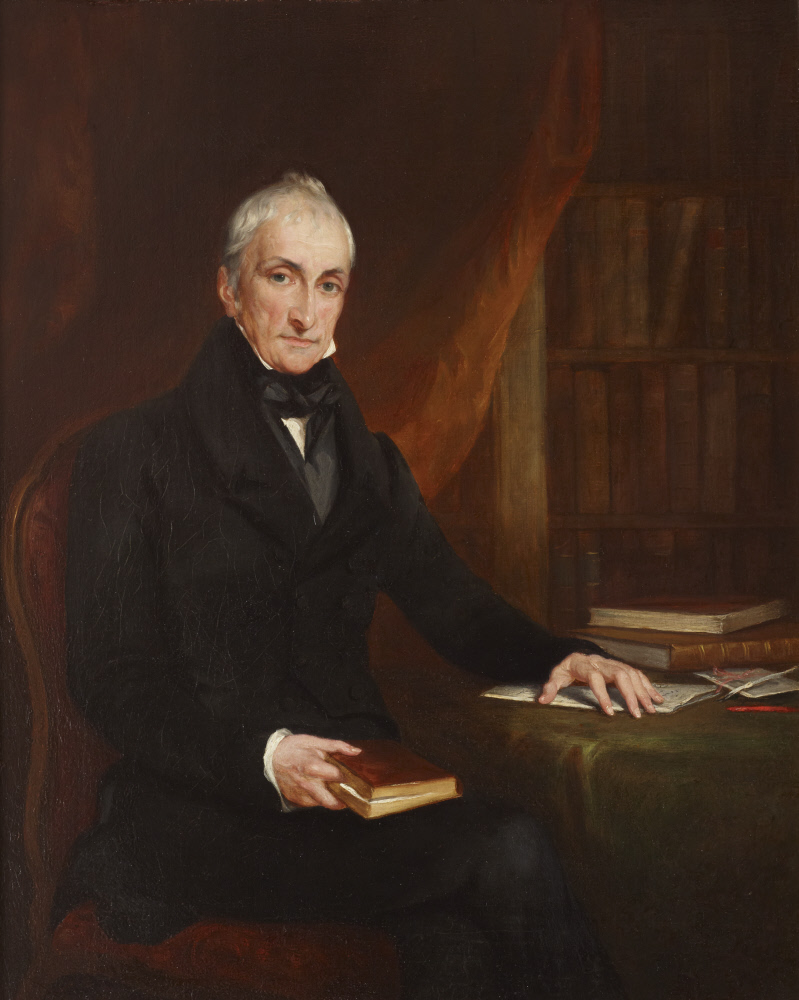
Frederick Hervey, 1st Marquess of Bristol.

The early Herveys were of French origins in particular the Duke of Orleans and a son named Robert Fitz-Hervey who accompanied William the Conqueror in the Norman invasion of 1066. Then there was the son of the Bishop of Ely in 1109 who accompanied Richard Lionheart on crusades. Then there was also a sacrist at the Abbey of St. Edmunds in Bury between 1121 and 1136. This family descends from John Hervey (born about 1290) of Bedfordshire. His descendant Thomas Hervey (died 1467) was the first Hervey to live at Ickworth, Suffolk, and was an ancestor of Sir Thomas Hervey of Ickworth, landowner and Member of Parliament for Bury St Edmunds from 1679 to 1690. Many other members of the family have represented this constituency in the House of Commons, including Sir Thomas Hervey's son John Hervey. On 27 March 1702/3, he was raised to the Peerage of England as Baron Hervey, of Ickworth in the County of Suffolk, and on 19 October 1714, he was further honoured when he was made Earl of Bristol in the Peerage of Great Britain. The 1st Earl of Bristol died in 1751. His two eldest sons (Carr and John) having died before him, he was succeeded in turn by three of his grandsons – all brothers and sons of the 1st Earl's second son John.

The 2nd Earl held political office as Lord-Lieutenant of Ireland and Lord Privy Seal and died unmarried. He was succeeded as 3rd Earl by his younger brother, who was a vice-admiral in the Royal Navy and also served as Chief Secretary for Ireland from 1766 to 1767. He also died without legitimate issue and was succeeded in December 1779 by the next younger brother, who thereby became the 4th Earl. Known as the "Earl-Bishop", the fourth Earl served as Church of Ireland Lord Bishop of Cloyne from 1767 to 1768 and as Lord Bishop of Derry from 1768 to 1803. Although an efficient clergyman, varying estimates have been found of his character. He had a reputation for high living, and hostelries in various countries took to calling themselves the ‘Hotel Bristol’, implying that they were the best in town. The custom continues today. In 1795, he began expanding his ancestral home, thus creating Ickworth House in its modern form. The house was still unfinished when he died in 1803 and was completed by his successor. In 1799, he became the fifth Baron Howard de Walden when the abeyance of this peerage was terminated. Bishop Lord Bristol married Elizabeth, sister and heir of Sir Charles Davers, 6th Baronet (1737–1806), and great-granddaughter of Thomas Jermyn, 2nd Baron Jermyn (see Baron Jermyn). His second son, John Augustus Hervey, Lord Hervey, was a captain in the Royal Navy and also served as ambassador to Florence. He predeceased his father. His daughter, the Hon. Elizabeth Catherine Caroline Hervey (1780–1803), married Charles Ellis, later first Baron Seaford. Their son Charles succeeded as sixth Baron Howard of Walden on the death of his great-grandfather, Lord Bristol, in 1803 (see Baron Howard de Walden and Baron Seaford). Upon the 4th Earl's death, the Bristol title passed to his third but eldest surviving son Frederick, who thereby became the 5th Earl. He was a politician and served under Henry Addington as Parliamentary Under-Secretary of State for Foreign Affairs from 1801 to 1803.

In 1826 the 5th Earl was created Marquess of Bristol and Earl Jermyn, of Horningsheath in the County of Suffolk, both in the Peerage of the United Kingdom. On his death in 1859 the titles passed to his eldest son Frederick (1800–1864). The 2nd Marquess was a Tory politician and was Treasurer of the Household under Sir Robert Peel from 1841 to 1846. When he died, the marquessate passed to his eldest son, also named Frederick. Before succeeding as 3rd Marquess, he had represented the traditional family seat in parliament and also served as Lord-Lieutenant of Suffolk. The 3rd Marquess died without male issue and was succeeded in turn by two of his nephews, the sons of Lord Augustus Hervey, second son of the 2nd Marquess. The 4th Marquess was a rear-admiral in the Royal Navy and also sat, as his uncle had done, as Conservative Member of Parliament for Bury St Edmunds. He had no sons and was succeeded in the Hervey titles and estates by his younger brother. The 5th Marquess was Minister and Consul-General to Colombia from 1919 to 1923, and Minister to Peru and Ecuador from 1923 to 1929. His only son, the 6th Marquess, was chancellor of the Monarchist League. He moved to Monte Carlo in early 1979 as tax exile, where he died on 10 March 1985.

The 6th Marquess of Bristol married three times. His son from his first marriage succeeded as 7th Marquess. A flamboyant character, he died childless at the age of 44 in January 1999. The 6th Marquess's only son from his second marriage, Lord Nicholas Hervey, died at the age of 36 in 1998. From his third marriage, the 6th Marquess had three children: Frederick Hervey, 8th Marquess of Bristol, Lady Victoria Hervey and Lady Isabella Hervey.

== Other family members ==
A significant number of other members of the family have also gained distinction. Sir Nicholas Hervey (d. 1532), brother of John Hervey, great-great-great-grandfather of the first Earl, was Ambassador from Henry VIII to the Holy Roman Emperor and took part in the famous jousts at the Field of the Cloth of Gold in 1520. His grandson William Hervey was created Baron Hervey in 1620. The Hon. Thomas Hervey, second son from the second marriage of the first Earl, held the family seat in parliament. The Hon. William Hervey, third son from the second marriage of the first Earl, was a captain in the Royal Navy. The Hon. Felton Hervey, sixth son from the second marriage of the first Earl, represented the family seat in Parliament and was the grandfather of Felton Hervey-Bathurst, who was created a baronet in 1818 (see Hervey-Bathurst baronets).

Sir George William Hervey (1845–1915), Comptroller-General and Secretary of the National Debt from 1894 to 1910, was the son of Lord William Hervey (1805–1850), third son of the first Marquess. The Right Reverend Lord Arthur Hervey, fourth son of the first Marquess, was Lord Bishop of Bath and Wells between 1869 and 1894. Lord Alfred Hervey, sixth son of the first Marquess, was a Conservative politician. His eldest son, The Very Reverend Frederick Alfred John Canon Hervey (1846–1910), was Chaplain-in-Ordinary to Queen Victoria from 1886 to 1901, and Domestic Chaplain to King Edward VII from 1878 to 1910. Lord Augustus Hervey, second son of the second Marquess, sat as Member of Parliament for the Western Division of Suffolk. Lord Francis Hervey, fourth son of the second Marquess, represented the most often held local seat in Parliament and served as First Civil Service Commissioner from 1907 to 1909.

== Baron Hervey (1703) ==
- John Hervey, 1st Baron Hervey (1665–1751) (created Earl of Bristol in 1714)
- John Hervey, 2nd Baron Hervey (1696–1743), sat in the House of Lords during his father's lifetime by writ of acceleration

=== Earl of Bristol (1714) ===
- John Hervey, 1st Earl of Bristol, 1st Baron Hervey (1665–1751)
  - Carr Hervey, Lord Hervey (1691–1723) (courtesy title)
  - John Hervey, 2nd Baron Hervey (1696–1743) (courtesy title until 1733, then sitting in House of Lords)
- George William Hervey, 2nd Earl of Bristol, (de jure) 2nd Baron Hervey (1721–1775)
- Augustus John Hervey, 3rd Earl of Bristol, 3rd Baron Hervey (1724–1779)
- Frederick Augustus Hervey, 4th Earl of Bristol, 4th Baron Hervey, 5th Baron Howard de Walden (1730–1803)
  - George Hervey (1755 – c. 1764)
  - John Augustus Hervey, Lord Hervey (1757–1796) (courtesy title)
- Frederick William Hervey, 5th Earl of Bristol, 5th Baron Hervey (1769–1859) (created Marquess of Bristol in 1826)

The Howard de Walden barony did not pass to the next earl. It instead passed through male-preference primogeniture to the 4th Earl's great-grandson Charles Ellis, son of the 4th Earl's granddaughter Elizabeth Hervey, Baroness Seaford.

=== Marquess of Bristol (1826) ===
- Frederick William Hervey, 1st Marquess of Bristol (1769–1859)
- Frederick William Hervey, 2nd Marquess of Bristol (1800–1864)
- Frederick William John Hervey, 3rd Marquess of Bristol (1834–1907)
- Frederick William Fane Hervey, 4th Marquess of Bristol (1863–1951)
- Herbert Arthur Robert Hervey, 5th Marquess of Bristol (1870–1960)
- Victor Frederick Cochrane Hervey, 6th Marquess of Bristol (1915–1985)
- (Frederick William) John Augustus Hervey, 7th Marquess of Bristol (1954–1999)
- Frederick William Augustus Hervey, 8th Marquess of Bristol (born 1979)

The heir apparent is the 8th Marquess' son, Frederick William Herbert Morley Hervey, Earl Jermyn (born 2022).

== Title succession chart ==
Title succession chart, Barons Hervey, Earls of Bristol, and Marquesses of Bristol.

Baron Hervey; Earl of Bristol
John Hervey; 1st Earl of Bristol; 1st Baron Hervey; 1665–1751
Carr Hervey; Lord Hervey; 1691–1723	John Hervey; 2nd Baron Hervey; 1696–1743
George Hervey; 2nd Earl of Bristol; 1721–1775	Augustus Hervey; 3rd Earl of Bristol; 1724–1779	Frederick Hervey; 4th Earl of Bristol; 1730–1803
Marquess of Bristol
Augustus Hervey; 1747–?	George Hervey; 1755 – c. 1764	John Hervey; Lord Hervey; 1757–1796	Frederick Hervey; 1st Marquess of Bristol; 1769–1859
Frederick Hervey; 2nd Marquess of Bristol; 1800–1864
Frederick Hervey; 3rd Marquess of Bristol; 1834–1907	Lord Augustus Hervey; 1837–1875
Capt. Charles Hervey; 1862–1893	Frederick Hervey; 4th Marquess of Bristol; 1863–1951	Lord Walter Hervey; 1865–1948 (Note: The younger brothers of the 4th Marquess were allowed by a warrant of precedence from the King to "have, hold and enjoy the title, rank, place, pre-eminence and precedence as the sons [...] of a Marquess", because their father would have held the marquessate but for his predeceasing the previous holder.)	Rev. Lord Manners Hervey; 1866–1944	Herbert Hervey; 5th Marquess of Bristol; 1870–1960
Victor Hervey; 6th Marquess of Bristol; 1915–1985
John Hervey; 7th Marquess of Bristol; 1954–1999	Lord Nicholas Hervey; 1961–1998	Frederick Hervey; 8th Marquess of Bristol born 1979
Frederick Hervey; Earl Jermyn born 2022

== Line of succession ==
Line of succession
- Frederick William Hervey, 1st Marquess of Bristol (1769–1859)
  - Frederick William Hervey, 2nd Marquess of Bristol (1800–1864)
    - Frederick William John Hervey, 3rd Marquess of Bristol (1834–1907)
    - Lord Augustus Henry Charles Hervey (1837–1875)
      - Frederick William Fane Hervey, 4th Marquess of Bristol (1863–1951)
      - Herbert Arthur Robert Hervey, 5th Marquess of Bristol (1870–1960)
        - Victor Frederick Cochrane Hervey, 6th Marquess of Bristol (1915–1985)
          - (Frederick William) John Augustus Hervey, 7th Marquess of Bristol (1954–1999)
          - Frederick William Augustus Hervey, 8th Marquess of Bristol (born 1979)
            - (1) Frederick William Herbert Morley Hervey, Earl Jermyn (b. 2022)
  - Lord William Hervey (1805–1850)
    - Francis Arthur Hervey (1849–1905)
      - Alec Francis Hervey (1885–1949)
        - Ronald Frederick William Hervey (1919–1997)
          - (2) Timothy Hugh Hervey (b. 1960)
            - (3) Benjamin James William Peacham Hervey (b. 1997)
  - Rt. Rev. Lord Arthur Charles Hervey (1808–1894)
    - George Henry William Hervey (1843–1933)
      - Gerald Arthur Hervey (1881–1917)
        - Anthony Gerald Hervey (1915–2000)
          - Gerald Edward Hervey (1949–2018)
            - (4) Simon Anthony Hervey (b. 1985)
              - (5) Peter David Edward Hervey (b. 2018)
          - (6) Christopher Symes Hervey (b. 1952)
            - (7) Toby James Symes Hervey (b. 1987)

== Family seat ==
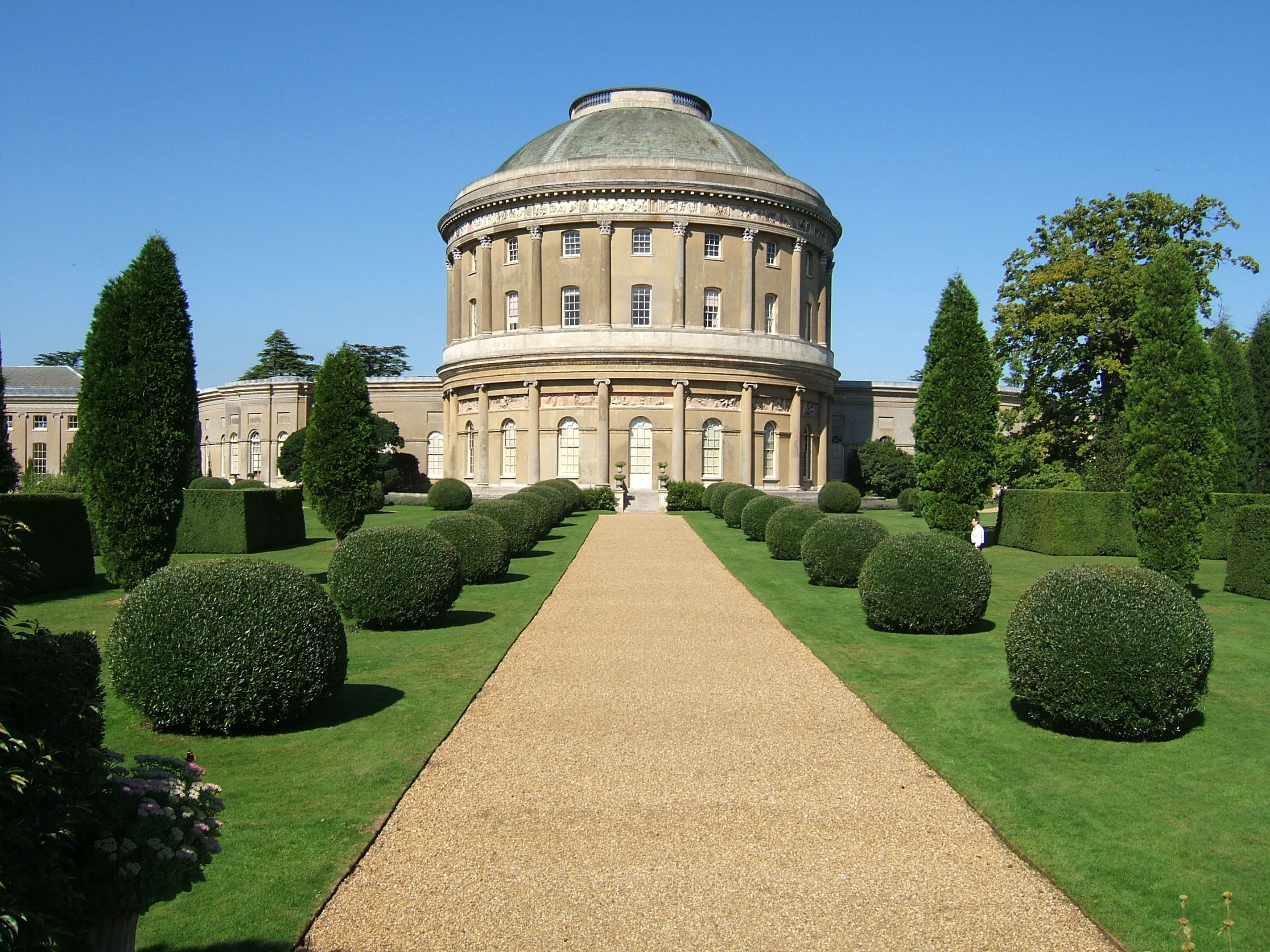
Ickworth House in August 2007.

The Herveys lived at Ickworth House and Park in Ickworth, Suffolk, from the mid 15th century to 1998. The present-day facade of the house was built by the end of the 18th century under the 4th Earl of Bristol. The traditional burial place of the Hervey family is Ickworth Church, surrounded by the estate. The line of Herveys buried in the vault under the church and in the churchyard begins with Thomas Hervey (d. 1467, who was the first of this family to own Ickworth) and includes every Earl and Marquess of Bristol, as well as many of their daughters and wives. In 1956, on the death of the 4th Marquess (d. 1951), his widow gave the house and grounds to the National Trust in abatement of death duties on cash and personal effects as absolute owners since the as a precondition imposed by the death duties regime (see inheritance tax), tempered by the discretion of the National Trust in granting limited leasebacks on strict terms to ancestral owners. The family, through whoever is Marquess of Bristol, was given a 99-year lease to occupy the East Wing of Ickworth, upon paying yearly expenses and below market rent.

In 1998, the 7th Marquess surrendered the remaining term of the lease to the National Trust, partly for funds and partly to ward off threatened forfeiture based on his behaviour as tenant. He died in 1999 with minimal remaining assets. His heir, the Frederick Hervey, 8th Marquess of Bristol, spoke in 2001 of his anger at not being granted a new lease as it went against the original Letter of Wishes when the house was handed over to the National Trust. The National Trust converted the East Wing into a hotel. In 2009 Sir Simon Jenkins, the National Trust's new chairman, stated, "I think it is in our interest for the Marquesses of Bristol to be living there."

== See also ==
- Earl of Bristol
- Davers baronets
- Baron Jermyn
- Baron Hervey (1620 creation)
- Baron Howard de Walden
- Baron Seaford
- Hervey-Bathurst baronets
- Ickworth House
- Ickworth Church
- Hotel Bristol
