= Little Horringer Hall =

Cottage in Horringer, St. Edmundsbury, Suffolk, UK

Coordinates: 52.23381°N 0.66112°E

Little Horringer Hall is a Grade II-listed house in Horringer, Bury St Edmunds, Suffolk, England.

There has been a hall in this location since the 17th century, and an earlier property was once the residence of Sir Richard Gipps. The present house was built around 1750 from red brick. A pair of bay windows and a replacement front door were added in the 20th century. It was the final residence of John Hervey, 7th Marquess of Bristol after he sold the remaining lease of the nearby Ickworth House to the National Trust owing to financial difficulties.
