= Lord Nicholas Hervey =

British aristocrat and activist

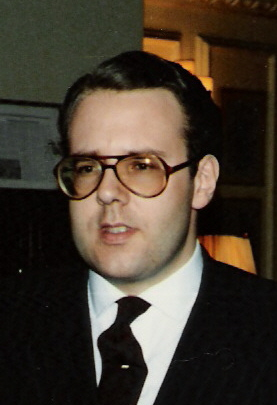
- Lord Nicholas Hervey in 1989
- Born: Lord Frederick William Charles Nicholas Wentworth Hervey; 26 November 1961
- Died: 26 January 1998 (aged 36); London, United Kingdom
- Education: Eton College; Yale University; Royal Agricultural College
- Parent(s): The 6th Marquess of Bristol; Lady Juliet Tadgell

Lord Frederick William Charles Nicholas Wentworth Hervey (/ˈhɑːrvi/) (26 November 1961 – 26 January 1998) (Note: A majority of sources document that Hervey was found dead on 26 January; Burke's Peerage lists his date of death as the day before, 25 January.) was a British aristocrat and political activist. He was the second son of the 6th Marquess of Bristol, but the only child by his second wife, the heiress Lady Juliet Wentworth-Fitzwilliam. As his elder half-brother was unmarried, he was heir presumptive to the Marquessate. At Yale University, he founded the Rockingham Club, a society for aristocracy and royalty. He died in 1998.

== Origins ==
Lord Nicholas's father was Victor Hervey, 6th Marquess of Bristol (1915–1985) of Ickworth House in Suffolk, a very wealthy aristocrat once described as "Mayfair's No. 1 Playboy," in a series of "life story" articles he wrote after serving a jail sentence for jewel robbery, a crime he claimed he had committed for a dare.

Lord Nicholas's mother, his father's second wife whom he had married in 1960 being her first husband, was Lady Juliet Wentworth-Fitzwilliam, the only child and sole heiress of the very wealthy 8th Earl Fitzwilliam (d.1948), who died in a small aircraft crash when she was aged 13. Also killed was his intended second wife, Kathleen, Marchioness of Hartington, a daughter-in-law of the Duke of Devonshire and a sister of US President John F. Kennedy. Lady Juliet thus inherited her father's estate of estimated value £45 million, and later managed the family stud farm.

After his father's death in 1985, Lord Nicholas was thus the heir presumptive to the title and any entailed estates of the Marquess of Bristol after his unmarried and childless elder half-brother, the 7th Marquess of Bristol (1954–1999), who inherited in 1985, the only child of his father's first marriage. Nicholas and the 7th Marquess were fond of one another. Nicholas was also the heir presumptive of the vast Fitzwilliam inheritance, through his mother.

When Nicholas was eleven years old, his mother divorced his father and remarried to his 60-year-old friend, Somerset de Chair (d. 1996) by whom five years later she had a daughter, Helena de Chair, who in 2007 married Jacob Rees-Mogg. In 1996, his mother remarried for a third time and is now known as Lady Juliet Tadgell.

Nicholas's father also remarried, to his private secretary, Yvonne Sutton, by whom he had three further children: the 8th Marquess of Bristol (born 1979), who inherited in 1999 and at whose Roman Catholic christening Nicholas had been a godfather; and two daughters, Lady Victoria Hervey and Lady Isabella Hervey.

== Education and clubs ==
Nicholas was known as a keen traditionalist. He was educated at Eton, Yale and the Royal Agricultural College, Cirencester.

=== Eton ===
At Eton, he was "an industrious boy with plenty of initiative" who took part in the House debate and during his last two-halves (terms) was in the House Library (i.e., a house prefect), founded and was president of the Burlington Society, a fine arts society with an emphasis on modern art and was a member of the Agricultural and Political Societies. He left Eton at Christmas 1979 with A-levels in French, Spanish and Economics.

=== Yale ===
At Yale, he took a degree in History of Art, requiring six years to graduate, which occurred in 1986. In 1981, whilst at Yale he founded the Rockingham Club, social club for descendants of royalty and aristocracy, which was later modified to allow membership to the children of the "super-wealthy". The Club and Nicholas Hervey were profiled in Andy Warhol's Interview magazine but the club was dissolved shortly thereafter in 1986. Nicholas' older half-brother John, a homosexual, was posthumously reported to be a special friend of Andy Warhol. Nicholas was a member, through his mother, of the Turf Club, a London gentlemen's club connected to horse racing.

=== Monarchist League and politics ===
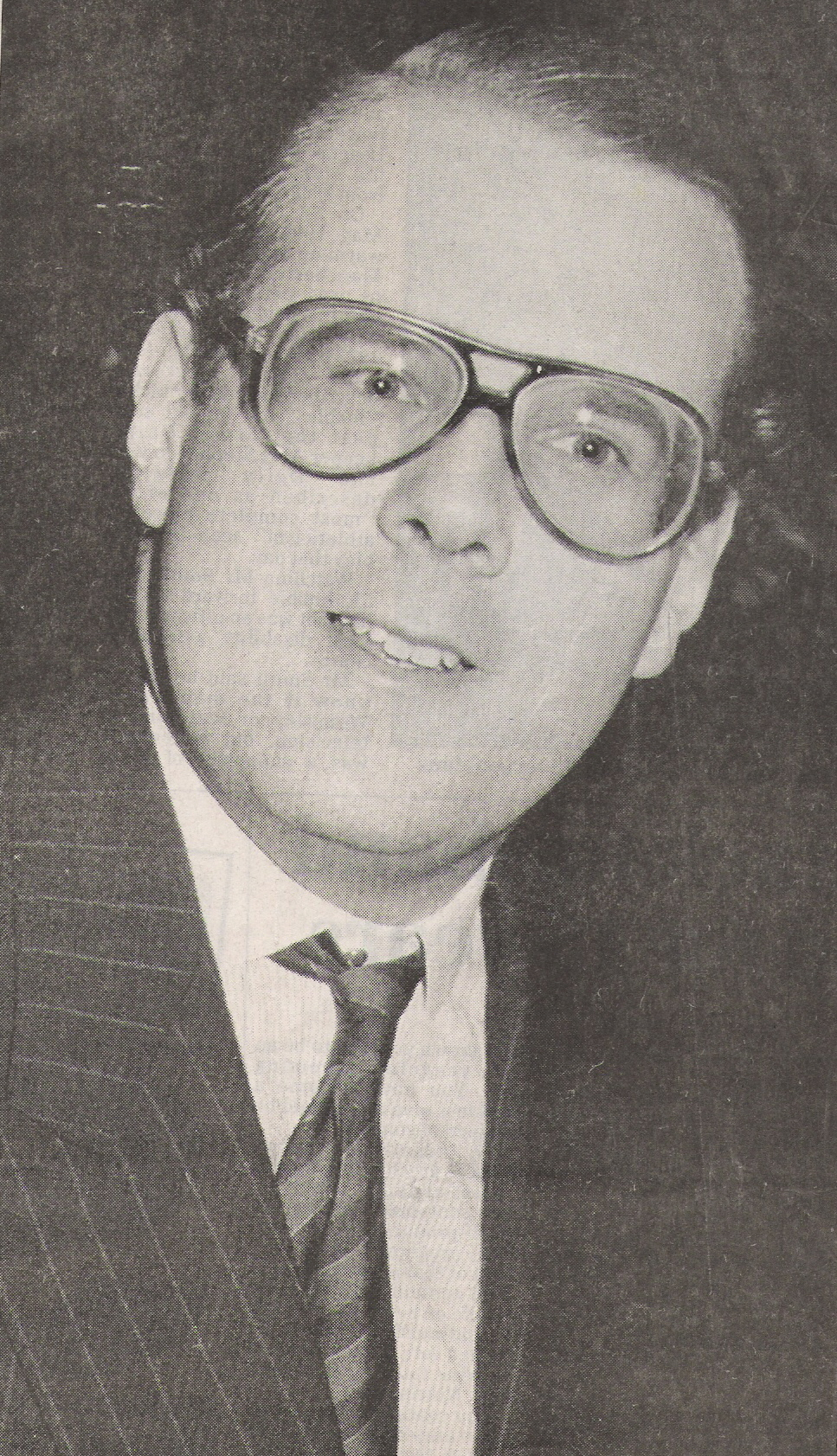
Lord Nicholas Hervey, portrait from the Daily Telegraph's 1998 obituary

He was a leading member of the International Monarchist League. He was elected President of its International Youth Association (under 21s) in February 1979 and recruited numerous new members. In 1985, he became a Vice-Chancellor of the League proper, and on 1 April 1986 made the formal toast to the guests Armin, Prince of Lippe and his wife at the League's Annual Dinner in the Cholmondeley Room of the House of Lords. In later years, he allowed his membership and vice-chancellorship to lapse.

Through the League, which his father had subsidised for many years, he became friendly with Gregory Lauder-Frost, who introduced him to numerous right-wing conservative activities. One such event, on 25 September 1989, was the Western Goals Institute dinner at Simpson's-in-the-Strand, chaired by Lord Sudeley, for the President of El Salvador, Alfredo Cristiani, and his inner cabinet.

== Illness, bankruptcy, and death ==
In 1983, Lord Nicholas was diagnosed with schizophrenia which was treated with medication. His mental health worsened when it was discovered that the principal heirs of the unentailed estate of his father, who had died in 1985, were not Nicholas and his elder brother — the latter had, however, inherited Ickworth House and a large fortune — but rather his third wife and their young children. Nicholas and John launched a lawsuit to have the will overturned. In 1991, Nicholas voluntarily underwent treatment in a clinic and was forced to declare bankruptcy due to debts to his lawyers of £38,000 which his trustees refused to fund. His own mother, while on the Sunday Times Rich List (in 2003 her wealth was estimated at £45,000,000), did not act to prevent the bankruptcy, which appears to have triggered his entry into the clinic. She subsequently declared that "he was never himself again" after the clinic stay.

Nicholas had severe depression and became increasingly reclusive. His landlady said that he "drew no shred of comfort from the high rank and great riches to which he was born" and that "he was a recluse, in the sense that he was heavily sedated and slept all day – a typical schizophrenic. He was very quiet, very Old Etonian. He was a nice guy, but very 'out of it'. Nobody visited him here, except sometimes we would hear someone come and take him out to dinner."

Lord Nicholas Hervey died on 26 January 1998 at the age of 36. He never married and had no children.

His half-brother, the 7th Marquess of Bristol, died less than a year later, also unmarried and childless, having been a habitual heroin addict for many years.
