= Frederick Hervey, 4th Marquess of Bristol =

British politician (1863–1951)

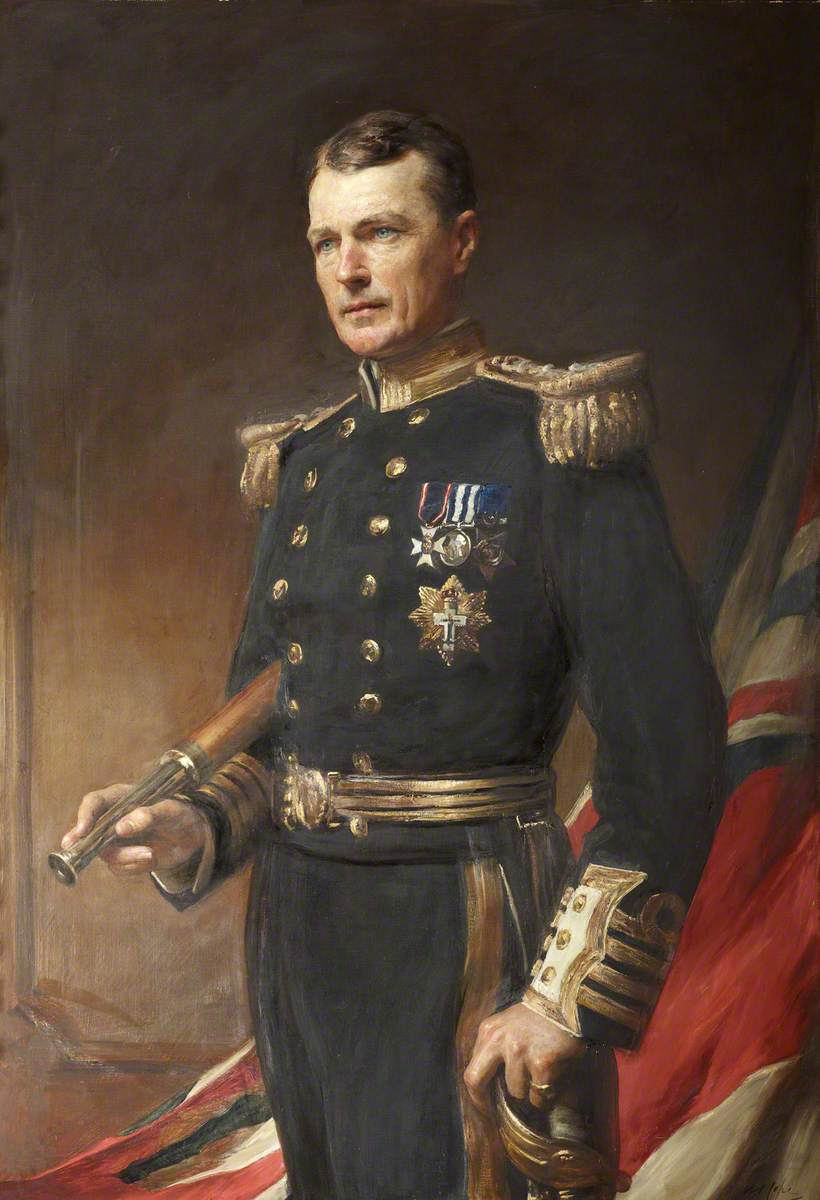
Rear Admiral The 4th Marquess of Bristol

Frederick William Fane Hervey, 4th Marquess of Bristol, MVO (8 November 1863 – 24 October 1951) was a British nobleman, naval officer and Conservative Party politician.

== Background ==
Hervey was the son of Lord Augustus Henry Charles Hervey (1837–1875), the younger brother of the 3rd Marquess of Bristol. He was born in Dresden, Germany, where his father was stationed.

He was educated at Tonbridge School and Eastman's Royal Naval Academy before joining HMS Britannia as a cadet in January 1877. He was a midshipman by the age of 15.

== Naval and political career ==
Hervey was promoted to lieutenant in June 1883, and to commander on 1 January 1895. In September 1898 he was appointed in command of the despatch vessel HMS Surprise, serving on the Mediterranean Station in early 1900.

In August 1901 he was appointed to command the cruiser HMS Prometheus, which was commissioned to serve in the Channel Squadron the following September. He was promoted to captain on 31 December 1901 and served in this rank for a decade, commanding the battleship Renown for two months in late 1907. He was placed on the Retired List at the rank of rear admiral in May 1911.

Hervey was elected at the general election in January 1906 as Member of Parliament (MP) for Bury St Edmunds, but automatically resigned in August the following year when he succeeded his uncle in the peerages. He later became chairman of West Suffolk County Council from 1915 to 1934.

== Family ==
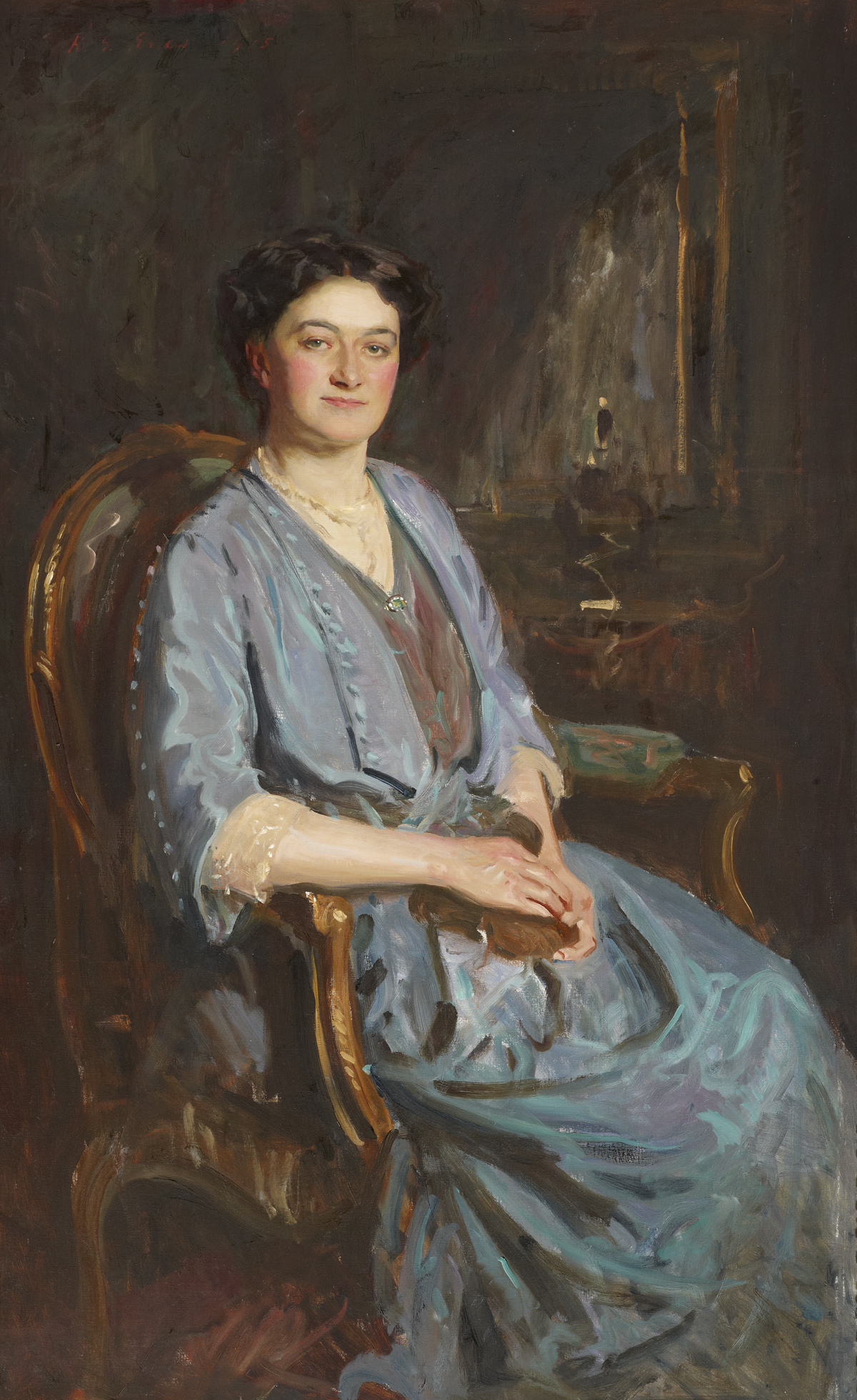
Alice Frances Theodora Wythes in 1915

The 4th Marquess married the heiress Alice Frances Theodora Wythes (1875–1957) in 1896. The couple had two daughters, Lady Marjorie Hervey and Lady Phyllis Hervey. Marjorie married John Erskine, Lord Erskine, while Phyllis’ daughter, Jean MacRae, married the 13th Earl of Northesk.

In 1907 the family moved from the lodge into Ickworth House, the family seat, which like most pre-War English country houses, maintained a large retinue. Feudal traditions still held sway, and the estate's tenants did not dare complain of poor housing, according to a memoir by the village schoolmistress. The 4th Marquess's brother was Lord Manner Hervey, rector 1900–1944 of the nearby village of Horringer, who also took services at Ickworth Church, the younger brother preaching to the elder.

Lord Bristol was succeeded by his youngest brother Lord Herbert Hervey.

Parliament of the United Kingdom
Preceded by Sir Edward Greene, Bt.	Member of Parliament for Bury St Edmunds; 1906–1907	Succeeded by Walter Guinness
Peerage of the United Kingdom
Preceded by Frederick Hervey	Marquess of Bristol; 1907–1951	Succeeded by Herbert Hervey
