= John Jermyn =

John Jermyn may refer to:

- John Hervey, 7th Marquess of Bristol, a.k.a. John Jermyn
- John Wesley Jermyn, homeless street performer in Los Angeles
- John Jermyn (field hockey), Irish field hockey player
