= John Hervey, 7th Marquess of Bristol =

British aristocrat (1954–1999)

The Most Honourable The Marquess of Bristol
- Tenure: 10 March 1985 – 10 January 1999
- Successor: The 8th Marquess of Bristol
- Born: 15 September 1954; Ickworth House, Bury St Edmunds, Suffolk, England
- Died: 10 January 1999 (aged 44); Little Horringer Hall, Ickworth, Suffolk, England
- Cause of death: Multiple organ failure due to chronic drug abuse
- Buried: Ickworth Church
- Spouse: Francesca Fisher (m. 1984; div. 1987)
- Parents: The 6th Marquess of Bristol; Pauline Bolton

Frederick William John Augustus Hervey, 7th Marquess of Bristol (/ˈhɑːrvi/ "Harvey"; 15 September 1954 – 10 January 1999), also known as John Jermyn and John Bristol, was a British hereditary peer, aristocrat and businessman. Although he inherited a large fortune, he died almost penniless from funding a chronic and persistent drug addiction.

John was the eldest child of the 6th Marquess of Bristol. He was distant from his father, who treated him harshly, and did not get on well with him, though he was close to his first stepmother, Lady Juliet. After spending time in London, Monte Carlo, Paris and New York in the 1970s, he settled in part of the family seat, Ickworth House in Suffolk, becoming the 7th Marquess in 1985. Despite inheriting a large fortune of up to £35 million, the Marquess spent most of it during his lifetime. He struggled with addiction to cocaine and other drugs, serving several jail sentences for possession, and was known for his flamboyant lifestyle and homosexuality. His brief marriage in the mid-1980s did not last because of this, and he became increasingly depressed as he lost money and faced bankruptcy, culminating in the sale of the remainder of Ickworth House to the National Trust. He died in early 1999 of complications resulting from his drug addiction, and was succeeded by his half-brother, Frederick Hervey, 8th Marquess of Bristol.

== Early years and family ==
The Hervey ancestral arms

Frederick William John Augustus Hervey was born on 15 September 1954, five years into the marriage between Victor Hervey, Earl Jermyn, the heir to the Marquessate of Bristol, and Pauline Bolton, daughter of a Kent businessman. He was their only child and his parents divorced when he was five years old in 1959. He grew up in the family home, Ickworth House, Bury St Edmunds, Suffolk, and was a ward of court for some time after his mother left Ickworth. In April 1960, his father inherited the Marquessate of Bristol following the death of the 5th Marquess; John Hervey in turn gained the courtesy title of Earl Jermyn.

The 6th Marquess, who had been jailed for jewel theft in his youth, behaved harshly towards his eldest son, according to friends of the family. He did not show John love or affection, and was strict to the extent that John was required to wear long white gloves during dinner. "He treated his son and heir with indifference and contempt," said Anthony Haden-Guest. Jamie Spencer-Churchill, a school friend, summed up the relationship: "Victor created the monster that John became."

His mother remarried, giving him Teddy Lambton, a Newmarket racehorse trainer, for a stepfather, and then a half-brother, George, who became a Conservative councillor. In 1960, his father married, secondly, Lady Juliet Wentworth-Fitzwilliam, the only child of Peter Wentworth-Fitzwilliam, 8th Earl Fitzwilliam. One son, Lord Nicholas Hervey, was born to this marriage. John Hervey was close to both his step-parents, whom he later recalled as being warm and generous.

His father's final marriage was to his private secretary, Yvonne Marie Sutton, in 1974, giving him three more half-siblings: the incumbent Frederick Hervey, 8th Marquess of Bristol, media personality Lady Victoria Hervey, and Lady Isabella Hervey. John Hervey did not get on well with Yvonne, whom he referred to as "Miss Crimplene", and he reportedly hurled a glass at the wall when he received a telegram from his father announcing the marriage. Around this time, his father attempted to prove that John was an illegitimate child, so could not inherit his titles and estates, but was unsuccessful. He also stripped Ickworth House of its contents while John was away, and he came home one weekend to find everything suddenly missing. Along with his half-brother Nicholas, Earl Jermyn attempted to sue his father's estate after Yvonne and her children were named the principal beneficiaries in the 6th Marquess's will, but failed.

== Later years ==
The Earl was educated at Harrow School and the University of Neuchâtel. He modelled himself on Oscar Wilde and began to use drugs and alcohol; the Oxford Dictionary of National Biography designates him a "wastrel". He inherited a million pounds when he was 16 years old, and another £4 million five years later. He eventually acquired a personal fortune worth up to £35 million, including oil wells in Louisiana and a 57,000-acre (23,000 ha) sheep farm in Australia. In his early 20s, he lived in a small flat and sold second-hand Bentley cars; friends recall he was at his happiest during this time. He moved to Monte Carlo shortly after his father had relocated there in 1975 as a tax exile, but did not enjoy living there and moved to Paris, settling in a flat on the Rue de Bellechasse. While there, he became openly gay and had a partner, which was picked up by the tabloid gossip columns. He had moved to Manhattan by the end of the decade, and enjoyed throwing parties.

The Earl was frequently depicted in the British tabloids for his drug use, wild parties and homosexuality. In May 1983, he was arrested on suspicion of trafficking $4 million of heroin and moved from New York back to Ickworth House. While there, on at least one occasion, the Earl piloted his helicopter without radar while snorting cocaine off the map he was using for navigation. On another, while accompanying his secretary Angela Barry, he crash-landed the helicopter in a field, and walked to the nearest farmhouse, demanding to use the phone while leaving mud everywhere. He became known for his dark sense of humour; on one occasion he allowed a young woman to ride a rubber dinghy into the middle of the lake at Ickworth and then shot at it with an air rifle, sinking it. On another, he was accused of opening a fridge door to retrieve a bottle of champagne by blasting it with a shotgun. He once drove along the hard shoulder of the M11 motorway at 140 miles per hour (230 km/h) to avoid traffic congestion.

"The Marquess and Marchioness of Bristol will not be able to attend the marriage of Earl Jermyn to Francesca owing to a prior engagement in London"

— Victor Hervey, 6th Marquess of Bristol, writing in The Times, 13 September 1984

Though the Earl had come out as homosexual, on 14 September 1984 he married Francesca Fisher, then 20, the day before his 30th birthday. In sharp contrast to the Earl, Fisher was a teetotaler and a vegetarian, and he hoped she would be a calming influence on his life. He also wanted to give up drug use and homosexuality and produce an heir. His father refused to attend the wedding, going as far as to place an advertisement in The Times that he had a prior engagement. The marriage lasted for three years, but quickly fell apart after he started freebasing cocaine and using rent boys. During the marriage, the Earl accidentally drove a car halfway over a cliff while Francesca was a passenger. They had no children. He later formed a close friendship with James Whitby, who became a companion for most of the remainder of his life.

The Earl inherited the title of Marquess of Bristol after his father died on 10 March 1985. Although Ickworth House had been given to the Treasury in lieu of death duties in 1956, and then handed over to the National Trust, he continued living there in the house's East Wing as part of the conditions. Following the collapse of his marriage, the Marquess became increasingly volatile. He blamed some of his difficulties on what he called "bad blood" and a "family disposition to depression". According to the Marquess, his father and mother both suffered from manic depression (now known as bipolar disorder) and he felt the same, though he appreciated that years of cocaine abuse had not helped matters. During this time, he saw his mother regularly, who was living in nearby Newmarket, using a helicopter to travel between there and Ickworth.

In 1988, the Marquess was imprisoned for a year in Jersey for cocaine possession and trafficking; a contemporary report said he was spending around £25,000 a year on the drug. He served seven months of the sentence and was released in April 1989.

The National Trust were unimpressed with the Marquess's behaviour, including dangerous driving around the estate and lack of control over his wolfhounds. They attempted to evict him from Ickworth House in 1994 but withdrew the threat because of the Marquess's ill health. In turn, the Marquess was upset about having to share Ickworth House with public visitors to the gardens; he fired a shotgun repeatedly into the air, shouting "fucking peasants, fucking National Trust!" at people. The House of Lords, by then under threat of reform, generally disliked the Marquess as his behaviour was damaging the House's reputation.

== Final years and death ==
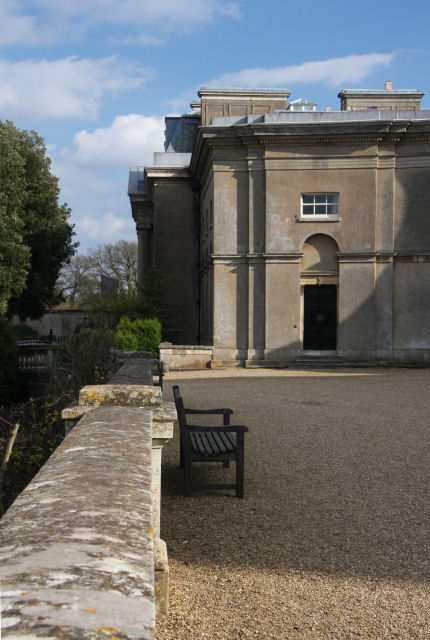
The East Wing of Ickworth House, where the Marquess lived for most of his life

By the early 1990s, friends were concerned about the Marquess's addiction to drugs, particularly since multiple prison sentences had done nothing to alleviate it. He was deported from Australia in April 1990 and charged with drug possession in November 1991 and March 1992. That October, his estate company was liquidated with debts over £650,000. In June 1993, he avoided a jail sentence by being ordered to attend a rehabilitation clinic, but travelled to the South of France instead and was sentenced to 10 months in an open prison, whence he was released after five. He was arrested again in September 1994 for possession.

Facing bankruptcy, the Marquess sold most of the contents of Ickworth House at auction in March 1994 for £2.3 million. He sold the remaining lease on the house back to the National Trust in April 1998, moving into Little Horringer Hall, a small house on the grounds. On 9 January 1999, he complained of a stomach ache and dizziness, and spent most of the day in bed. He was found dead the following morning.

While there were rumours that the Marquess had died from AIDS, having apparently contracted HIV in 1986, the coroner recorded that he died of "multiple organ failure due to chronic drug abuse". A post-mortem examination showed traces of cocaine, as well as several legal drugs, in his system. His agent said that despite years of ill health through drug abuse, he was greatly shocked by his death.

The Marquess's funeral took place on 23 February at Bury St Edmunds Cathedral. He was buried at St Mary's Church, Ickworth, as is traditional for all peers of the Hervey family.

== Legacy ==
"What happened to him was just awful. When you see someone lose everything, it puts you off. I mean he blew everything."

— Lady Victoria Hervey, speaking about her half-brother

The 7th Marquess was succeeded by his half-brother, Frederick. His other paternal half-brother, Nicholas, had died a year before him, while his mother had died in 1996. The new Marquess did not attend his half-brother's funeral but expressed sadness at what had happened. He also said he was angry at being unable to live at Ickworth, as the remaining lease had been sold to the National Trust. His half-sister Victoria shared similar sentiments, and stated that she has avoided drugs as a result of her relationship with John. The 7th Marquess's maternal half-brother, George Lambton, said he had no hard feelings about the disappearance of the money, and that the Marquess had "packed more in his 44 years than most people do in their whole lives".

The £5,000 left in his estate was quickly taken up by expenses, mostly for his funeral. His will stipulated that £100,000 should be left to Whitby and £25,000 each to his butler, Thomas Foley, and his chauffeur; however, it is unknown whether they were ever paid. A trust fund had been set up for Frederick, but his half-sisters received nothing. The House of Lords Act 1999 abolished most hereditary peers' rights; consequently, as well as having no residence at Ickworth, the 8th Marquess does not have a seat in the House.

Following the 7th Marquess's death, his agent hoped that the story would serve as a warning about the dangers of drug addiction. Ickworth Church, which the 7th Marquess had bought in 1986 after commissioners declared it redundant, was inherited by the 8th Marquess and restored with a Heritage Lottery grant. The East Wing of Ickworth House was converted by the National Trust into a luxury hotel in 2002.

Peerage of the United Kingdom
Preceded by Victor Hervey	Marquess of Bristol; 1985–1999	Succeeded by Frederick Hervey
