= Victor Hervey, 6th Marquess of Bristol =

British peer (1915–1985)

The Most Honourable The Marquess of Bristol
- Lord Bristol and Lady Juliet Wentworth-Fitzwilliam on their wedding day, 1960

Member of the House of Lords
- Lord Temporal
- In office 5 April 1960 – 10 March 1985
- Preceded by: The 5th Marquess of Bristol
- Succeeded by: The 7th Marquess of Bristol

Personal details
- Born: Victor Frederick Cochrane Hervey; 6 October 1915
- Died: 10 March 1985 (aged 69)
- Spouses: Pauline Bolton (m. 1949; div. 1959) Lady Juliet Wentworth-Fitzwilliam (m. 1960; div. 1972) Yvonne Marie Sutton (m. 1974)
- Children: John Hervey, 7th Marquess of Bristol; Lord Nicholas Hervey; Lady Anne Hervey; Lady Victoria Hervey; Frederick Hervey, 8th Marquess of Bristol; Lady Isabella Hervey
- Parent(s): Herbert Hervey, 5th Marquess of Bristol; Lady Jean Cochrane

Victor Frederick Cochrane Hervey, 6th Marquess of Bristol (6 October 1915 – 10 March 1985), was a British aristocrat, hereditary peer and businessman. He was a member of the House of Lords, Chancellor of the International Monarchist League, and an active businessman who later became a tax exile in Monaco.

Victor Hervey was the only son of Herbert Hervey, 5th Marquess of Bristol. He acquired a notorious reputation as a playboy in the 1930s. He was briefly imprisoned for jewellery theft in 1939. He inherited the Marquessate on his father's death in 1960, and acquired a large fortune through this and his business dealings. He was married three times and is the father of John Hervey, 7th Marquess of Bristol, Frederick Hervey, 8th Marquess of Bristol, Lord Nicholas Hervey, Lady Victoria Hervey, and Lady Isabella Hervey. He spent his final years in Monaco to avoid income tax with his third wife and three youngest children.

== Early life ==
Victor Hervey was born on 6 October 1915, the only son of Lord Herbert Hervey, later 5th Marquess of Bristol, and Lady Jean Cochrane, a daughter of Douglas Cochrane, 12th Earl of Dundonald, and Winifred, Countess of Dundonald. His godmother was Queen Victoria Eugenie of Spain.

He was educated at Eton and the Royal Military College, Sandhurst, but was asked to leave the latter, because of bad temperament.

Until 1951, he had no title, as his father was a younger son and inherited the family titles and estates from his older brother in that year.

== Crime and imprisonment ==
Victor Hervey has been called the Pink Panther of his day when, as the ringleader of a gang of former public school boys known as the Mayfair Playboys, who, whilst drunk, and as a dare, assaulted and robbed a jeweller from Cartier, as a result of which two of them (but not Hervey) were sentenced to being flogged with the cat o' nine tails. Hervey seems not to have actually taken a direct part in that robbery himself. It has been said that he is remembered mainly for having taken part in a jewel robbery which he did not in fact commit, though he was convicted of a similar offence, in the same decade and in the same part of London (Mayfair).

In July 1939, Hervey was arrested and charged with stealing jewellery, rings and a mink fur coat with a total value of £2,500 from a premises in Queen Street, Mayfair, and £2,860 of jewellery from a property on Park Lane. He was refused bail, and imprisoned for three years. The recorder of the court observed: "The way of the amateur criminal is hard. But the way of the professional is disastrous". He later sold an article about his life and exploits to a newspaper. His father, who had led a respectable life, as had been the case for all the men of the Hervey family since the Victorian era, broke down in tears on hearing the sentence.

== Business dealings ==
Prior to receiving his trust income, Victor Hervey declared bankruptcy in 1937 with debts of £123,955, (approximately £7.3 million today). He had been selling guns during the Spanish Civil War to both sides, hoping to receive £30,000 as a bribe, which failed and led to the debts. He nevertheless continued in his arms-dealing activities and was Franco's principal agent for many years. Bristol went on to amass a fortune, both inherited and earned, estimated to be in excess of £50 million.

In 1941, Victor Hervey claimed to have been listed in a secret document written by Heinrich Himmler as an enemy of the Third Reich, but there is no evidence that such a document ever existed.

From 1951, he held the courtesy title of Earl Jermyn, by which name he was known until inheriting the Marquessate in 1960, when he became also Earl of Bristol and Baron Hervey of Ickworth in Suffolk, Hereditary High Steward of the Liberty of Bury St Edmunds, and patron of thirty Church of England benefices, with landed estates in Suffolk, Essex, Lincolnshire, and Dominica in the West Indies.

In 1973, he was recorded as having a great many business interests, with estates in Suffolk, Lincolnshire and Essex. He was then Chairman of Sleaford Investments Limited, Eastern Caravan Parks Ltd., Estates Associates Ltd., Ickworth Forestry Contractors Ltd., Cyprus Enterprises Co., V.L.C. Associates Ltd., Marquis of Bristol & Co., The Bristol Publishing Company, Radio Maria Ickworth Automatic Sales Ltd., Bristol International Airways Ltd., Dominca Enterprises Co., World Liberty Plots and other companies. He owned the Ickworth Stud, Suffolk, and the Emerald Hillside Estates in Dominica.

He was sometime President of the National Yacht Harbour Association, a member of the House of Lords Yacht Club, the Hurlingham Club, and the East Hill Club, Nassau, Bahamas.

== Family ==
On 6 October 1949, Mr Victor Hervey, as the future Bristol then was, married Pauline Mary Bolton, daughter of Herbert Coxon Bolton; they were divorced in 1959. They had one son, John Hervey, 7th Marquess of Bristol (15 September 1954 – 10 January 1999), who married Francesca Fisher in 1984 (and divorced in 1987).

Lord Bristol was alleged to have been a harsh father to his eldest son, according to friends of the latter. "He treated his son and heir with indifference and contempt", said journalist Anthony Haden-Guest. The Marquess of Blandford summed up the relationship: "Victor created the monster that John became."

On 23 April 1960, eighteen days after his father's death, he married secondly Lady Juliet Wentworth-Fitzwilliam, daughter of Peter Wentworth-Fitzwilliam, 8th Earl Fitzwilliam, and twenty years his junior. The Fitzwilliam family were not happy about the marriage, owing to Victor's reputation. The couple were divorced in 1972, having had one son, Lord Nicholas Hervey (26 November 1961 – 26 January 1998), and one daughter, Lady Anne Hervey (stillborn, 26 February 1965). Both marriages failed because of Victor's infidelity; Lady Juliet subsequently saying "If you want to screw hookers when you are married, you make damn sure you are not caught".

His third wife was Yvonne Marie Sutton, whom he married on 12 July 1974 at Caxton Hall. They had a son, Frederick Hervey, 8th Marquess of Bristol (born 1979), and two daughters: Lady Victoria Hervey (born 1976) and Lady Isabella Hervey (born 1982), who married Christophe de Pauw. Victor’s eldest son, John, by then Earl Jermyn, did not like Yvonne, and was upset about the third marriage, and with his brother Lord Nicholas unsuccessfully sued his father, after his will named Yvonne and her children as his main beneficiaries.

== Monaco and other interests ==
In early 1979, Bristol, with his third wife and young children, moved to Monte Carlo, as tax exiles. He reportedly lowered the Union Flag at his home in Belgravia before leaving, vowing never to set foot on English soil again. Although living in Monte Carlo in an apartment, he continued to employ a butler and a nanny.

Bristol was vice-president of the UK Taxpayers Union, was a member of the West India Committee, and was considered an expert on Central American affairs. He was also Vice-President of the English-Speaking Union (East Region), and a generous donor to the Ambulance Corps in Northern Ireland.

He was a member, until his death, of the International Monarchist League, joining its Grand Council in 1964, from which time he also became a patron. In 1975, he was elected as the League's Chancellor. He was also a long-standing member of the Conservative Monday Club.

The Marquess was a patron of the arts and a collector, an acknowledged authority on the painters Lawrence Alma-Tadema and James Tissot, and "a lover of art and beauty in all its forms". He had acquired a substantial amount of 19th-century artwork at the time of his death.

== Death ==
Le Formentor, Monaco

The 6th Marquess of Bristol died in Monaco on 10 March 1985, aged 69, and was buried in Menton, France. On his grave was inscribed his motto "Je n'oublieray jamais" ("I shall never forget"). At the time of his death, he was living at 1E Le Formentor, Avenue Princesse Grace, Monte Carlo.

On 30 August, probate was granted in London for Bristol’s estate in England and Wales, valued at only £7,508. His name was stated as “Most Honourable Marquis Victor Frederick COCHRANE”.

In October 2010, Bristol's last surviving son, the 8th Marquess of Bristol, repatriated his father’s remains, which were reburied in the family vault at the parish church of Ickworth, after a memorial service in St Leonard's Church, Horringer, Suffolk.

== See also ==
- Marquess of Bristol for the history of the Hervey family

== Sources ==
- Burkes Peerage, Baronetage, and Knightage. Edited by Peter Townend, 105th edition. London, 1970, p. 345.
- The Monarchist, 1985, number 66, Norwich, UK (Memorial on p. 3).
- De-la-Noy, Michael. The House of Hervey. London, 2001. ISBN 1-84119-309-7
- "The police file on Victor Hervey" (PDF). The Times. London. Archived from the original (PDF) on 24 July 2008.
- The Real Pink Panther: Lord Victor Hervey – a TV documentary aired on Channel 4 on 2 March 2009.

Peerage of the United Kingdom
Preceded by Herbert Hervey	Marquess of Bristol; 1960–1985; Member of the House of Lords (1960–1985)	Succeeded by John Hervey
Peerage of Great Britain
Preceded by Herbert Hervey	Earl of Bristol; 1960–1985	Succeeded by John Hervey
Peerage of England
Preceded by Herbert Hervey	Baron Hervey; 1960–1985	Succeeded by John Hervey
