= Frederick Hervey, 8th Marquess of Bristol =

British peer (born 1979)

The Most Honourable The Marquess of Bristol

Personal details
- Born: Frederick William Augustus Hervey; 19 October 1979 (age 47)
- Spouse: Meredith Dunn (m. 2018)
- Children: 1 daughter and 1 son
- Parent(s): The 6th Marquess of Bristol; Yvonne Marie Sutton
- Education: Sunningdale School; Eton College; University of Edinburgh (BCom)

Frederick William Augustus Hervey, 8th Marquess of Bristol (born 19 October 1979), is a British peer and landowner who is currently the chairman of Bristol Estates. He is also High Steward of the Liberty of St Edmund, which encompasses the whole former county of West Suffolk.

== Early life ==
He is the only son of the late 6th Marquess by his third wife, the former Yvonne Sutton. He is the brother of Lady Victoria Hervey (born 1976) and Lady Isabella Hervey (born 1982).

He became heir to his elder half-brother the 7th Marquess in January 1998 upon the death of his other half-brother, Lord Nicholas Hervey. He succeeded to the marquessate and its subsidiary titles in January 1999, becoming Marquess and Earl of Bristol, Earl Jermyn, and Baron Hervey of Ickworth. He was unable to take his seat in the House of Lords before the House of Lords Act 1999 came into force, because he was under 21 years of age.

== Business career ==
After graduating from the University of Edinburgh in 2002, Lord Bristol went to live in Estonia, where he managed a Baltic property fund for seven years. He is currently the chairman of Bristol Estates, which owns historic property interests in Horringer and other villages in Suffolk, Great Chesterford, Essex, Sleaford, Lincolnshire, and in Kemptown, Brighton.

== Public life ==
Lord Bristol is patron of several organisations, including The Abbey of St Edmund Reborn, the Gwrych Castle Preservation Trust, the Athenaeum in Bury St Edmunds, and the Friends of West Suffolk Hospital. He is Vice President of Friends of the Suffolk Record Office, Trustee of General Sir William Hervey's Charitable Trust, and founder, Trustee, and Chairman of the Ickworth Church Conservation Trust.

Lord Bristol came second in the last hereditary peer by-election in November 2023 before the Labour Party suspended future by-elections before ending heredity peers in the House of Lords.

He is also Hereditary High Steward of the Liberty of St Edmund.

== Ickworth House and Church ==
In 1998, the 7th Marquess sold his lease to occupy the East Wing of Ickworth House, the family seat since the 15th century. After his half-brother's death on 10 January 1999, the 8th Marquess vigorously criticised the National Trust for not being willing to sell him what would have been the remaining term of that lease, arguing that the 7th Marquess could only sell his own life interest, and not that of his successors. This was disputed by the National Trust, which by 2001 had converted the East Wing into a hotel.

In 2005, Lord Bristol created the Ickworth Church Conservation Trust to safeguard the future of St Mary's Church, Ickworth, and he transferred ownership of the Church from himself to the Trust. He later led a restoration project and sourced the £1.2 million required to restore the building. He remains as Chairman and Trustee of the ICCT, which now owns and manages the Church.

== Private life ==
In 2011, Lord Bristol was romantically linked to the fashion model Alana Bunte.

On 11 May 2018, Lord Bristol married Meredith Dunn, an American art consultant, in a Roman Catholic wedding at the Brompton Oratory. They have a daughter, Lady Arabella Prudence Morley Hervey (born on 8 March 2020), and a son, Frederick William Herbert Morley Hervey, Earl Jermyn (born on 25 July 2022).

Peerage of the United Kingdom
Preceded by John Hervey	Marquess of Bristol; 1999–present	Incumbent; Heir apparent: Frederick Hervey, Earl Jermyn
Preceded by John Hervey	Earl of Bristol; 1999–present	Incumbent; Heir apparent: Frederick Hervey, Earl Jermyn
Preceded by John Hervey	Baron Hervey; 1999–present	Incumbent; Heir apparent: Frederick Hervey, Earl Jermyn
Orders of precedence in the United Kingdom
Preceded by The Marquess of Ailesbury	Gentlemen	Followed by The Marquess of Ailsa
