= 1907 Bury St Edmunds by-election =

UK Parliamentary by-election

← 1906	24 August 1907	Jan. 1910 →

Candidate	Guinness	Yates
Party	Conservative	Liberal
Popular vote	1,631	741
Percentage	68.8%	31.2%
MP before election
Frederick Hervey
Conservative
Subsequent MP
Walter Guinness
Conservative

The 1907 Bury St Edmunds by-election was held on 24 August 1907. The by-election was held due to the succession to the peerage of the incumbent Conservative MP, Frederick Hervey who become the Fourth Marquess of Bristol. It was won by the Conservative candidate Walter Guinness.

== Campaign ==
The by-election was a strong campaigning ground for the suffragette movement and the Women's Social and Political Union made it a target for propaganda sending high level members, including Gladice Keevil, Nellie Martel, Emmeline Pankhurst, Aeta Lamb, Rachel Barrett and Elsa Gye.

== Result ==
Bury St Edmunds by-election, 1907
Party	Candidate	Votes	%	±%
Conservative	Walter Guinness	1,631	68.8	+10.2
Liberal	Walter Baldwyn Yates	741	31.2	−10.2
Majority		890	37.6	+20.4
Turnout		2,372	86.6	−4.1
Conservative hold		Swing	+10.2	
