= Thingoe Hundred =

Historic hundred in Suffolk

Coordinates: 52.25°N 0.65°E

Thingoe Hundred

Thingoe was a hundred of Suffolk, consisting of 31,850 acres (128.9 km^{2}).

One of the smaller hundreds of Suffolk, around 9 miles (14 km) wide and 11 miles (18 km) long, Thingoe contained the borough of Bury St Edmunds on its eastern border, though the town was considered a separate jurisdiction. The remainder of the hundred consisted of the land to the west of Bury St Edmunds. The River Lark rises in the hundred, flowing north to the River Little Ouse.

The name derives from the words thing, a Norse word meaning "assembly", and howe, again Norse, meaning detached hill or mound.

== Parishes ==
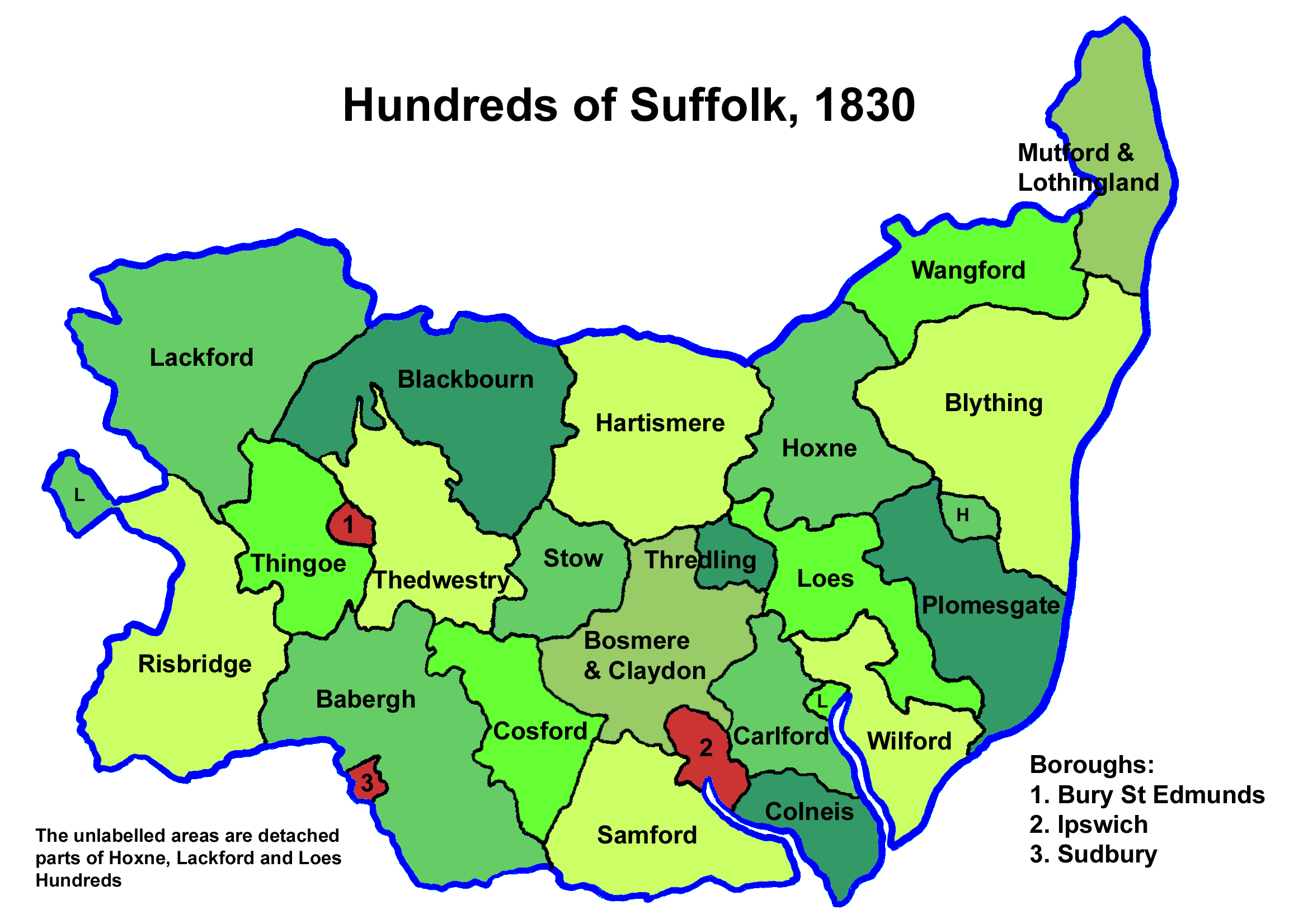
Suffolk hundreds

Thingoe Hundred consisted of the following 18 parishes:

Map	Parish	Area (acres)
Thingoe Hundred, 1838
Thingoe Hundred, 1838	Barrow	2810
Thingoe Hundred, 1838	Brockley	1080
Thingoe Hundred, 1838	Chevington	2240
Thingoe Hundred, 1838	Flempton	720
Thingoe Hundred, 1838	Fornham All Saints	2200
Thingoe Hundred, 1838	Great Saxham	1670
Thingoe Hundred, 1838	Hargrave	1870
Thingoe Hundred, 1838	Hawstead	1980
Thingoe Hundred, 1838	Hengrave	1000
Thingoe Hundred, 1838	Horningsheath	1780
Thingoe Hundred, 1838	Ickworth	1350
Thingoe Hundred, 1838	Lackford	2470
Thingoe Hundred, 1838	Little Saxham	1300
Thingoe Hundred, 1838	Nowton	1320
Thingoe Hundred, 1838	Rede	1310
Thingoe Hundred, 1838	Risby	2620
Thingoe Hundred, 1838	Westley	680
Thingoe Hundred, 1838	Whepstead	3450
