= Ickworth =

Civil parish in Suffolk, England

Coordinates: 52.217°N 0.671°E

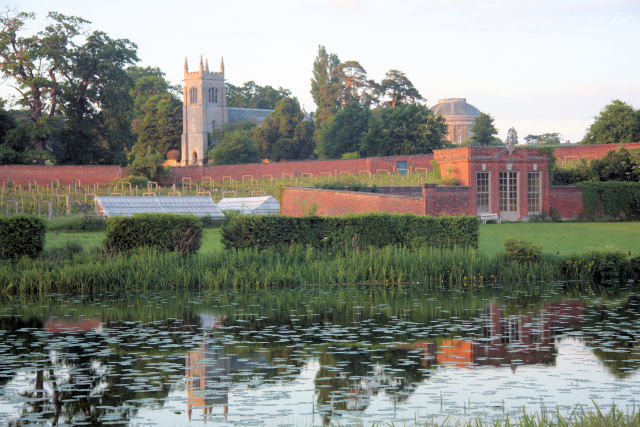
- Ickworth House and St Mary's Church

- Location within Suffolk
- Population: 30
- OS grid reference: TL8161
- District: West Suffolk
- Shire county: Suffolk
- Region: East
- Country: England
- Sovereign state: United Kingdom
- Post town: Bury St Edmunds
- Postcode district: IP29
- Police: Suffolk
- Fire: Suffolk
- Ambulance: East of England

Ickworth is a small civil parish, almost coextensive with the estate of the National Trust's Ickworth House, in the West Suffolk district of Suffolk, eastern England, 2.3 miles (3.7 km) south-west of Bury St Edmunds. The population of the parish was only minimal at the 2011 Census and is included in the civil parish of Lawshall.

== Landmarks ==
Ickworth has three main clusters of the 12 listed structures in the Grade II* listed park and garden which are:

Name	Grade	Notes
Ickworth House	Grade I	National Trust
Sir John Hervey's Summerhouse	Grade II	
St Mary's Church	Grade II*	
White House	Grade II	
Mordaboys Cottages	Grade II	Thatched 17th century.
Garden walling by summerhouse	Grade II	
Coach House	Grade II	
Garden wall by church	Grade II	
Ha-ha	Grade II	
Stable Block	Grade II	
Balustrading by entrance	Grade II	

The main park also had the only vineyard on National Trust land, until 2015 when it was grubbed up to allow the walled garden to be reinstated. An orchard of historic fruit trees was planted as the first stage of this plan.

== History ==
=== Early history ===
Mentioned in the Domesday Book of 1086 as having 12 heads of household (nine of which villagers (villeins), three as smallholders) and four tied serfs (slaves), Ickworth rendered £3 and a small vill-tax to its overlords and was valued as being worth £4 per year.

=== Modern history ===
Samuel Lewis's overview of 1848 reads:

...a parish, in the union and hundred of Thingoe, W. division of Suffolk, 2½ miles (S. W.) from Bury St. Edmund's; containing 62 inhabitants. This place is the property of the Marquess of Bristol, whose magnificent seat is within the parish. The mansion, consisting of a circular centre connected with wings by extensive corridors, was commenced in 1792, but the western wing is not yet completed; the park, which includes the parish, comprises about 2000 acres of rich land. The surface is varied, and the lower grounds are watered by a rivulet which expands into a broad lake, the whole forming one of the most splendid demesnes in the country. The living is a discharged rectory, valued in the king's books at £7. 11. 5½., and in the gift of the Marquess: the tithes have been commuted for £192. 1. 6., and the glebe comprises 5 acres. The church, the tower of which has been rebuilt by the present marquess, who has also added a south aisle, has a chancel in the early English style, and some windows in the decorated and later styles.

The bulk of the land formed Lord Bristol's main freehold estate which was sold for public benefit to the National Trust to pay the precursor to inheritance tax in 1956.

In 2005 its population was estimated at 30.

== Demography ==
The 2011 census does not provide a population (see above) although Ickworth is part of the west of Census Output Area E00153548, which had 275 inhabitants of which 185 lived in a detached dwelling, 16 lived in a purpose-built block of flats or tenement, five in part of a converted or bed-sit and one in a commercial building.

== Transport ==
To the east is the A143 which is linked to the A14 by the shortest route via a turning onto a minor straight road in Horringer, Westley Lane, immediately to the north. The A14 is a main East-West route in England which then leads west to:

- The A11, its south spur onto the M11
- The M11 at Cambridge
- The A1 at Huntingdon
- The M1/M6 junction at Swinford, Leicestershire
