= Herbert Hervey, 5th Marquess of Bristol =

British peer

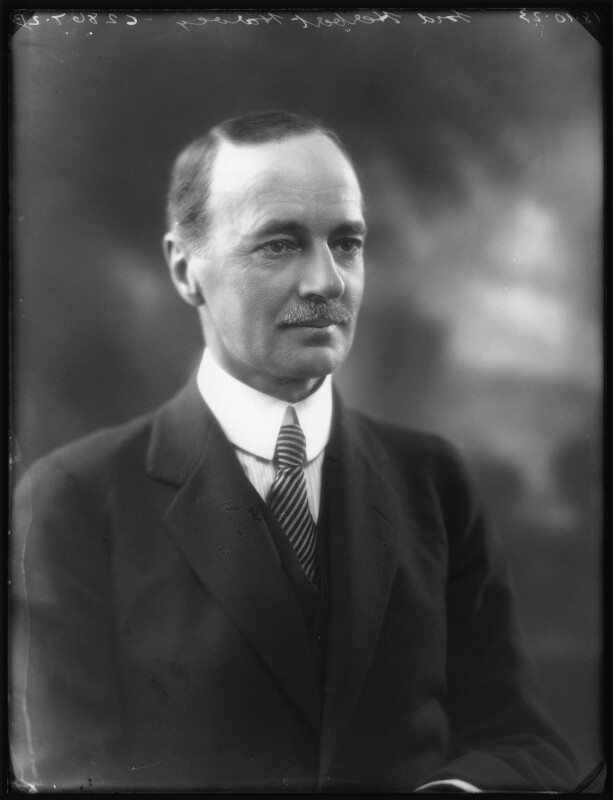
Herbert, 5th Marquess of Bristol

Herbert Arthur Robert Hervey, 5th Marquess of Bristol (10 October 1870 – 5 April 1960), styled Lord Herbert Hervey from 1907 to 1951, was a British peer and diplomat.

== Early life ==
The 5th Marquess was born on 10 October 1870 at the family home of Ickworth House near Bury St Edmunds, Suffolk. He was the fifth son of Lord Augustus Hervey (1837–1875), MP for West Suffolk, and Mariana, née Hodnett (died 30 January 1920). Lord Augustus was the younger brother of the 3rd Marquess of Bristol, and the younger son of the 2nd Marquess of Bristol. He was educated at Clifton College.

== Diplomatic career ==
In 1892 Hervey joined H.M. Diplomatic Service, becoming Consul in Chile in 1892 for three years. He was consul at Guatemala from early 1903. For a year he served as chargé d'affaires at Montevideo and Guatemala, and was Consul in Abyssinia from 1907 to 1909. He was listed as a commercial attaché in 1913, and was elevated to the status of Envoy Extraordinary and Minister Plenipotentiary to Colombia in 1919–1923 and Peru and Ecuador in 1923–1928, retiring in 1929.

He was awarded the Grand Cross of the Order of the Sun by the Peruvian government and succeeded his brother Frederick, 4th Marquess of Bristol, in the marquessate in October 1951.

== Marriages ==
Lord Hervey married twice:

1. 19 October 1914 (divorced 1933), Lady Jean Cochrane (d. 5 January 1955), daughter of the 12th Earl of Dundonald, and had one son, Victor, who succeeded him in his titles.
2. 15 December 1952, Dora Frances Emblin (died 27 March 1953), only daughter of George Marshall, and widow of Don Pedro de Zulueta.

Diplomatic posts
Preceded by Percy Wyndham	British Minister to Colombia; 1919–1923	Succeeded by William Seeds
Preceded by Arthur Grant Duff	British Minister to Peru and Ecuador; 1923–1928	Succeeded by Charles Bentinck
Peerage of the United Kingdom
Preceded by Frederick Hervey	Marquess of Bristol; 1951–1960	Succeeded by Victor Hervey
