= Liberty of St Edmund =

Area in Suffolk, UK

The Liberty of St Edmund covers the entire area of the former administrative County of West Suffolk. This area had been established by Edward the Confessor in 1044 and was a separate jurisdiction under the control of the Abbot of Bury St Edmunds Abbey until the dissolution of the monasteries affected Bury St Edmunds Abbey in 1539.

The area of the Liberty of St Edmund was originally known as the "Eight and a Half Hundreds" which included the Hundreds of Thingoe, Thedwastre, Lackford, Risbridge, Blackburn and Babergh, and the half hundred of Cosford. Blackbourn and Babergh each counted as a "double hundred'. Combined these made the Eight and a Half Hundred.

The Liberty was granted to the Abbey of Bury St Edmunds by Edward the Confessor. A Steward was appointed to administer the Liberty on behalf of the Abbot in the same way that the Sheriff acted for the county. The first Steward was named Ralph, and was appointed by William I. The title subsequently passed through various hands and became hereditary with the de Windsors in 1115.

The present Hereditary High Steward of the Liberty of St Edmund is The 8th Marquess of Bristol.
