= Lady Isabella Hervey =

British model, actress and aristocrat

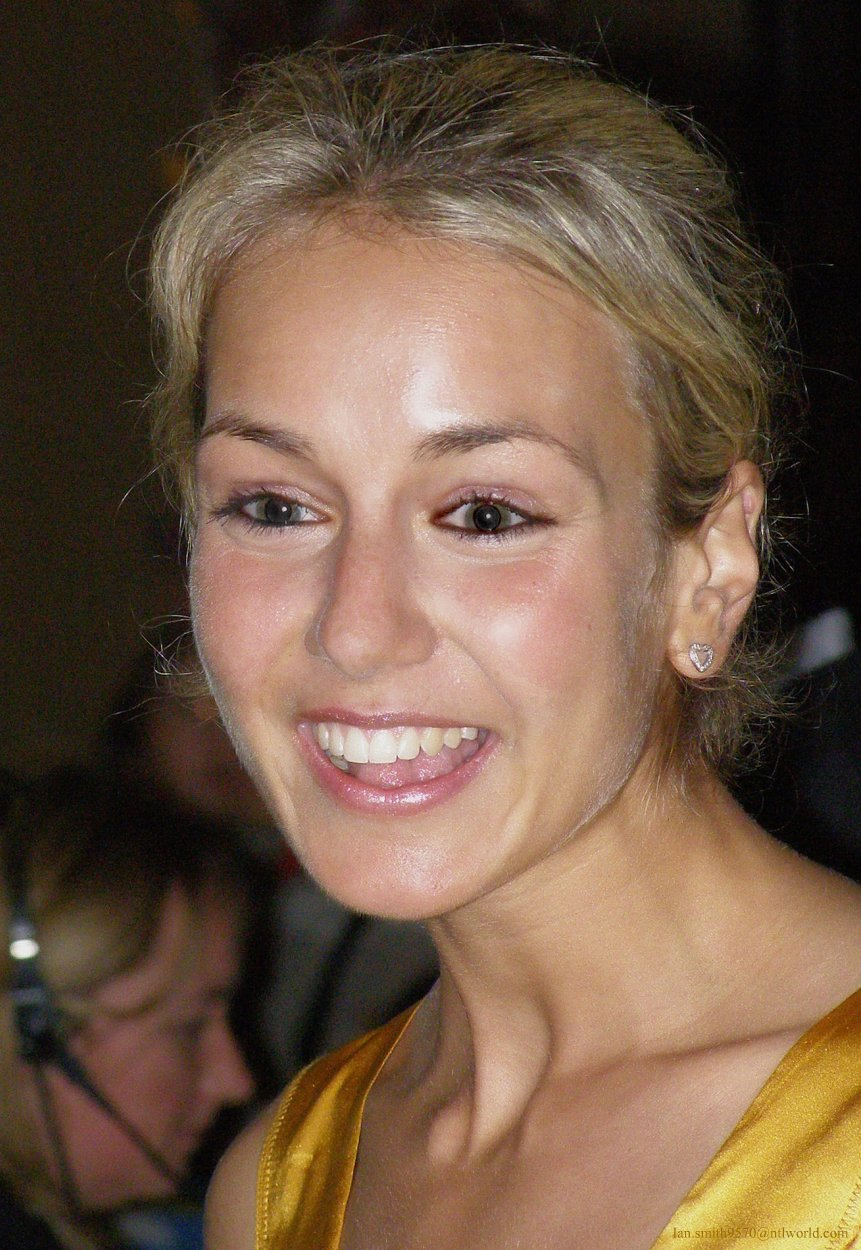
- Lady Isabella at a film premiere in 2007
- Born: Isabella Frederica Louisa Hervey; 9 March 1982 (age 44); Monaco
- Spouse: Christophe de Pauw (m. 2014; div. 2023)
- Children: 3
- Parent(s): Victor Hervey, 6th Marquess of Bristol; Yvonne Marie Sutton
- Website: isabella-hervey-fitness.com

Lady Isabella Frederica Louisa de Pauw (née Hervey /ˈhɑːrvi/; born 9 March 1982) is a British model, socialite, aristocrat, and reality TV personality. She is the daughter of the 6th Marquess of Bristol, the sister of Lady Victoria Hervey and the incumbent 8th Marquess of Bristol, and half-sister of the 7th Marquess of Bristol.

== Early life ==
Lady Isabella was born in Monaco to Victor Hervey, 6th Marquess of Bristol, and his third wife, Yvonne Marie Sutton. Her godparents included Fadila of Egypt and her half-brother John, Earl Jermyn. She was educated at Woldingham School. Her father, Lord Bristol, died when she was three, and she was sent to boarding school at the age of six. She suffered from bulimia in her youth, but recovered after seeking treatment at The Priory hospital. She also joined Overeaters Anonymous. She enjoyed sports from an early age, including professional showjumping.

== Career ==
Lady Isabella's television career has included appearing on the Channel 4 reality TV show The Games (2004), and for appearing as a contestant on ITV's Celebrity Love Island (2005). In 2005, she was named "face of Playboy UK". She has appeared as a contestant on Celebrity MasterChef and the UK Sky One television programme Vroom Vroom. She also competed in the Sky One show Cirque De Celebrite, and the BBC1 show Hole in the Wall.

Her participation in The Games inspired her to try a new career as a personal trainer. She began running a set of fitness courses that included a jog around Hyde Park.

== Family ==
Hervey has two elder full siblings: the incumbent Frederick, 8th Marquess of Bristol, and fellow media personality Lady Victoria Hervey. In addition to John, who became the 7th Marquess, she had a half-brother, Lord Nicholas; both are now deceased.

In a 2005 interview, she stated that her title held her back in her modelling career. "When I first started, the bookers assumed I didn't need the cash, so wouldn't put me forward for the big money jobs. At the end of the day, just because I'm a Lady, it doesn't mean I'm rich." Her half-brother, the 7th Marquess, spent most of the £35 million family fortune in his lifetime, and she subsequently complained she had been left with "virtually nothing". Her father died before setting up a trust fund for her as he had for her two older siblings.

On 6 September 2014, Lady Isabella married Belgian millionaire Christophe de Pauw in the Église de Notre Dame de la Cambre, Brussels. The couple have a son, Victor, born on 5 January 2016 and named after her father, the 6th Marquess. He was the first member of the Hervey family to be christened at Ickworth Church in nearly 40 years. They have two more children. Hervey and de Pauw divorced in 2023; she now lives in Portugal, where she works as a fitness instructor.
