= Rockingham Club =

Two different English and American clubs

There have been two "Rockingham Clubs"

== The original Rockingham Club (founded 1753) ==
This was founded in York, England and had its first meeting on 23 December 1753 in the George Inn, York.

It was named after 'Lord Rockingham' (Charles Watson-Wentworth, 2nd Marquess of Rockingham, KG, PC (13 May 1730 – 1 July 1782)), who during his term of office as British prime minister repealed the Stamp Act 1765, reducing the tax burden on the American colonies. Rockingham also backed the claim for American independence and in 1782, when he was appointed prime minister for a second time, upon taking office he acknowledged the independence of the United States, initiating an end to British involvement in the American Revolutionary War.

Members included:

- John Carr (architect)
- Michael McQueeney

== The Yale University 'Rockingham Club' (1981-1986) ==
The Yale Rockingham Club was a Yale University student club founded by British-born Yale undergraduate Lord Nicholas Hervey, a descendant of Lord Rockingham, as a social club for Yale student descendants of royalty or aristocracy, a requirement later modified to allow membership by offspring of the "super-wealthy."

The club survived five years (1981–1986) and the clubhouse (privately purchased by a small group of members including Hervey and Salem Chalabi) was an off-campus historic clapboard building housing a full-length portrait of Hervey (who took six years to graduate), as well as a ballroom and chandelier, and where parties were held.

== See also ==
- List of Yale University student organizations
- Charles Watson-Wentworth, 2nd Marquess of Rockingham

== Sources ==
- NY Times Article on Rockingham Club at Yale
- February 1986 Interview Magazine Article on Rockingham Club
- Iovine, Juli V. Lipsticks and Lords: Yale's New Look, in The Wall Street Journal, 4 August 1987, p. 1.
