= Yvonne Hervey, Marchioness of Bristol =

British aristocrat

Yvonne Marie Hervey, Dowager Marchioness of Bristol (née Sutton; born 1944), is the widow of British peer Victor Hervey, 6th Marquess of Bristol, and the mother of Frederick Hervey, 8th Marquess of Bristol, as well as Lady Victoria Hervey and Lady Isabella Hervey.

Daughter of Anthony Sutton, of Woodstock, The Glen, Farnborough Park, Farnborough, Kent, in 1974 she became the third wife of the 6th Marquess of Bristol. In the late 1970s they moved to Monaco as tax exiles, living there in an apartment, but continued to employ a butler. She became stepmother to her husband's two children from previous marriages, but had a difficult relationship with them, particularly John, the elder.

By the 2000s Lady Bristol was visiting Britain frequently. In 2010 her son arranged for her late husband to be reburied in Ickworth Church, alongside many other members of his family. The same year, she was reported to divide her time between Monaco and a flat in Eaton Square, Westminster. She has helped author Michael De-la-Noy with his research on the Hervey family.
