= Lady Victoria Hervey =

British socialite

Victoria Hervey
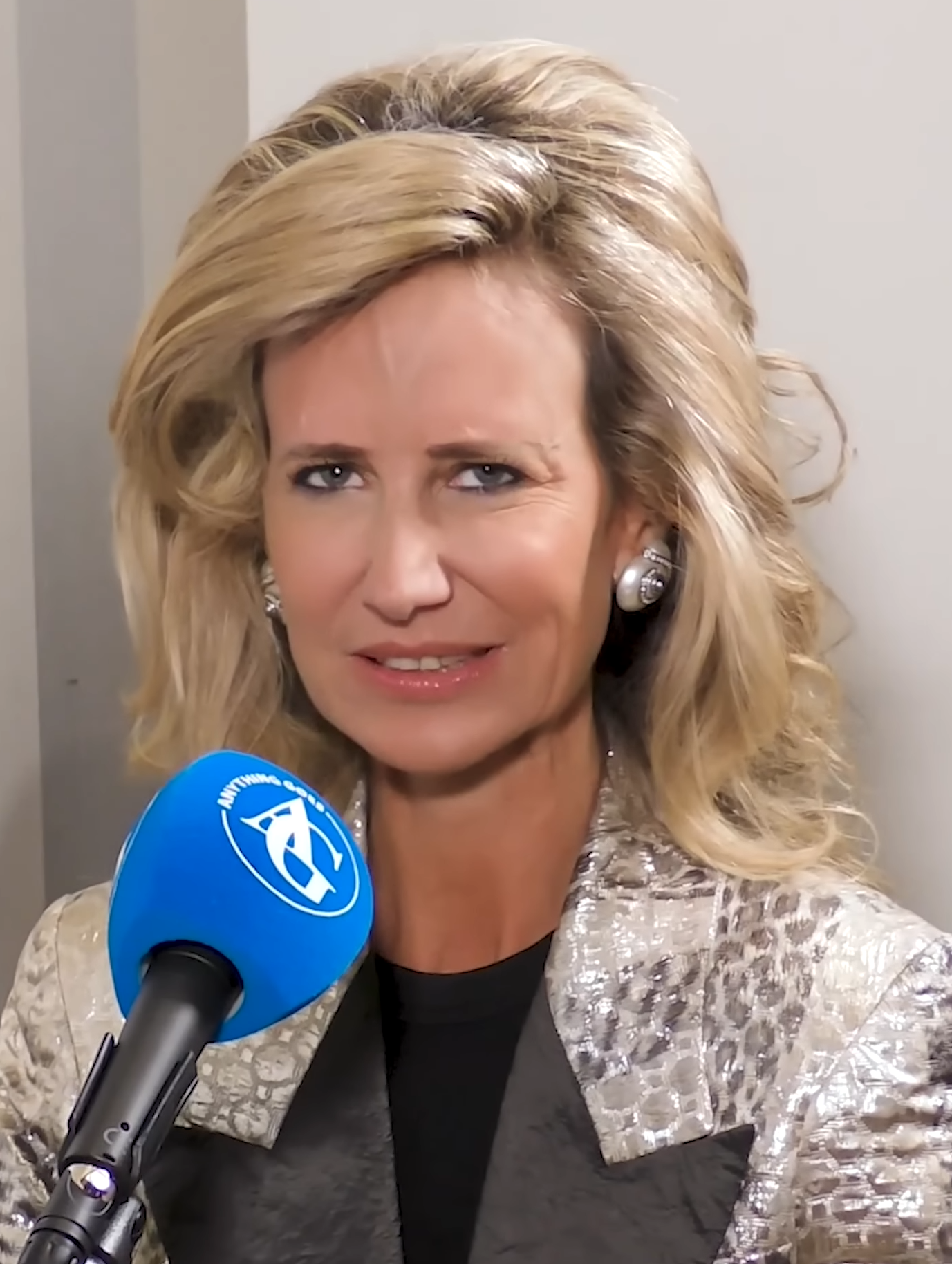
- Hervey in 2025
- Born: Victoria Frederica Isabella Hervey; 6 October 1976 (age 50); London, England
- Education: Benenden School
- Occupations: Socialite; model
- Parents: The 6th Marquess of Bristol; Yvonne Marie Sutton
- Relatives: John Hervey, 7th Marquess of Bristol; Frederick Hervey, 8th Marquess of Bristol; Lady Isabella Hervey

Lady Victoria Frederica Isabella Hervey (/ˈhɑːrvi/; born 6 October 1976) is an English model, socialite, and former "It girl". She is the daughter of the 6th Marquess of Bristol, half-sister of the 7th Marquess, and sister of the 8th Marquess and Lady Isabella Hervey.

== Early life ==
Hervey ancestral arms

Lady Victoria is the eldest child of the 6th Marquess of Bristol and his third wife, Yvonne Marie Sutton, and was born on her father's 61st birthday, 6 October 1976. She is the elder sister of the incumbent 8th Marquess of Bristol and Lady Isabella Hervey. Her older half-brothers were the 7th Marquess of Bristol and Lord Nicholas Hervey, both of whom are deceased. Leka, Crown Prince of Albania, stood sponsor as one of her godfathers.

For the first two years of her life Hervey lived at Ickworth House, the family seat in Suffolk, before her parents went into tax exile in Monaco. At the time of her father's death in 1985, the family was living in an apartment in Monte Carlo.

She was educated at Benenden School, and spent a gap year in Florence before working at advertising agencies in London.

== Career ==
=== Early work ===
After Hervey turned down a place to study French and History of Art at the University of Bristol, her mother stopped her allowance and she reluctantly became a receptionist for producer Michael Winner.

=== Modelling and fashion ===
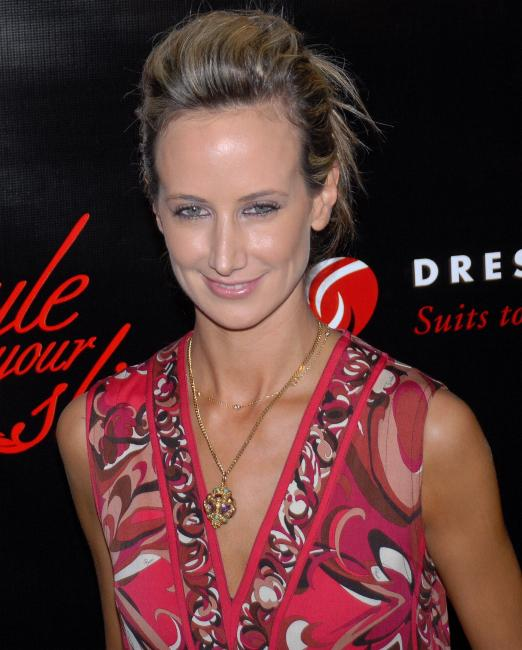
Hervey at a fashion show in 2008

Hervey became a part-time catwalk model in a career move she hoped would take her into television presenting, but with her statuesque six-foot height she took to the career full-time, ultimately modelling for Christian Dior. In 1999, she appeared together with Melania Trump in a photoshoot for Town and Country Magazine.

In April 2000, she and friend Jayne Blight opened Knightsbridge fashion boutique Akademi. Frequented by Victoria Beckham, Meg Mathews and Martine McCutcheon, it closed in 2001 with debts estimated at £350,000. Hervey was reportedly only £20 out of pocket by the business failure but in the year following the closure, Hervey owed a series of personal debts.

In 2012, it was reported that Hervey had taken the position as Events and Society Editor for The Untitled Magazine, a bi-annual magazine about fashion and entertainment.

=== Film ===
In December 2003, Hervey secured a small part in the 2004 Colin Hanks film Rx as a waitress in a diner.

=== Television ===
In 2001, Hervey made a cameo appearance as herself in the BBC sitcom Absolutely Fabulous. In 2004, she appeared on the Channel Five reality series The Farm. In 2006, she appeared in the ITV dating show Love Island. In 2007, she appeared on ITV's Don't Call Me Stupid programme, where she was asked to learn about the Labour Party with George Galloway. In 2015, Hervey, an experienced skier, appeared on Channel 4's The Jump where she participated on the condition her dog joined her in Austria.

== Literary ==
In 2016, Hervey's young adult book, Lady in Waiting, was published by Finch. The novel is semi-autobiographical and concerns life at a girls' boarding school.

== Personal life ==
Hervey moved to Los Angeles in 2004, but later returned to live in Knightsbridge, London in 2022. She has had relationships with several well-known people, including the then Prince Andrew (briefly during 1999) and Boyzone member Shane Lynch.

Hervey is a supporter of Reform UK, and has described herself as a bridge between the party and the MAGA movement in the United States. She collects signed MAGA hats and has proposed a "Make England Great Again" movement.

=== Controversies ===
In 2003, Hervey attracted controversy after saying, "It's so bad being homeless in winter. They should go somewhere warm like the Caribbean where they can eat fresh fish all day."

In January 2022, Hervey said in an interview that she felt that Ghislaine Maxwell had used her as "bait", to attract women to Jeffrey Epstein's parties. She later suggested that a photo showing the then Prince Andrew with Virginia Giuffre had been faked with body doubles, calling Giuffre "a complete whore" after Andrew allegedly raped Giuffre three times. After Giuffre's suicide, Hervey sparked outrage by sharing a link to the news of her death on social media with the comment "When lies catch up with you there's no way out."

During a live LBC radio interview with Tom Swarbrick in February 2026, Hervey discussed various aspects of the Epstein files. She attracted controversy defending former Prince Andrew's inclusion, saying, "To be honest, if you're not in those files, it would be an insult... because it just means you were a bit of a loser." She added that she was also included, and believed Epstein was still alive.
