= Lady Jean Cochrane =

British aristocrat (1887–1955)

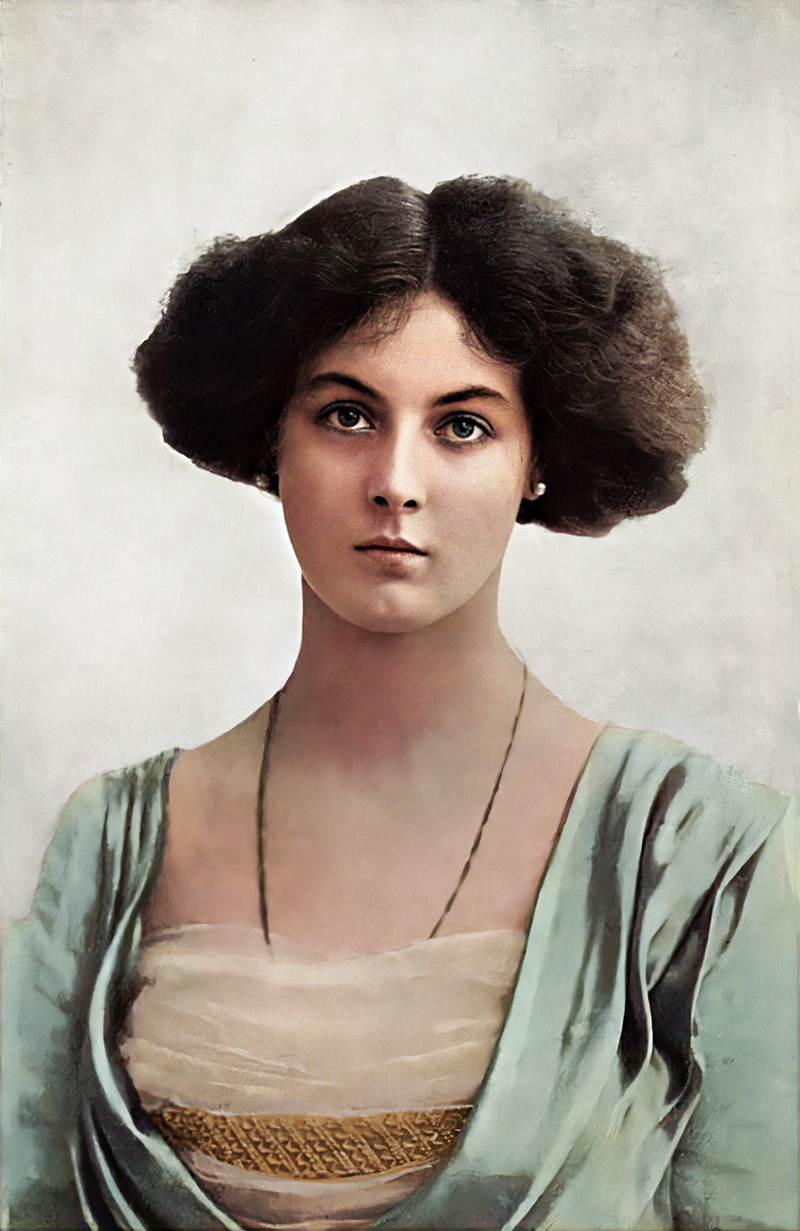
- Born: 27 November 1887; 50 Eaton Place, London
- Died: 5 January 1955 (aged 67); Dundonald, South Ayrshire
- Spouse(s): Lord Herbert Hervey (m. 1914; div. 1932) Sir Peter Macdonald (m. 1933)
- Children: Victor Hervey, 6th Marquess of Bristol
- Parents: Douglas Cochrane, 12th Earl of Dundonald (father); Winifred Bamford-Hesketh (mother)

Lady Jean Alice Elaine Cochrane (later Hervey, then Macdonald; 27 November 1887 – 5 January 1955) was a British aristocrat. She was the daughter of Winifred, Countess of Dundonald and Douglas Cochrane, 12th Earl of Dundonald.

== Work and duties ==
Cochrane was a famous figure in her time. In her youth, she modelled for prominent publications and appeared in The Bystander, Tatler, Country Life, and The Sketch.

During the First World War, In 1916, she became a nurse who treated war casualties at the Red cross hospital at Portman Square, London.

In 1917, she was within Diplomatic services and was serving within the Foreign office at Whitehall, London.

She helped support the Society for Waifs and Strays by opening several fundraisers for the cause. a society which directly improves the lives of children and young people for whom it provides services and to create a positive shift in social attitudes to improve the situation facing all children and young people.

On 14 July 1937 she launched the Royal Navy warship HMS Enchantress.

== Personal life ==
Lady Jean was the fourth child to Winifred and Douglas Cochrane. She spent most of her youth at Gwrych Castle.

She was a keen sportswoman who was particularly fond of golf.

On 19 October 1914, she married Lord Herbert Hervey with whom she had a son, Victor Hervey, 6th Marquess of Bristol; his godmother was the Spanish Queen Victoria Eugenie of Battenberg.

In 1932, after Lady Jean discovered that her husband was having an affair at their Portman Square apartment, she filed for divorce on grounds of adultery and in July of that same year the divorce was granted without Herbert contesting. The Portsmouth Evening News's divorce section stated that "Lady Jean complained of her husband's association with other women shortly after they were married, and differences arose".

In December 1933, Cochrane remarried at a London register office to a Captain Peter Macdonald. Macdonald, later knighted, was a Conservative politician for the Isle of Wight. Jean assisted him in his work.

In the late evening on Monday, January 5, 1955, Lady Jean suffered a heart attack while being treated at Kilmarnock Infirmary for bronchitis. A telegram was sent to her husband in London informing him of her condition; upon receiving it he travelled to Scotland to see her. However, a storm prevented him from reaching her in time. She died at the age of 67.

Her funeral was held at St Paul's Church, Knightsbridge on 10 January and she was later cremated at Golders Green Crematorium.
