= John Wesley Jermyn =

American street performer

- Education: Pepperdine University
- Known for: Street performer, Music, Clothing label

John Wesley Jermyn, also known as "The Crazy Robertson" or "The Robertson Dancer", is a homeless street performer in Los Angeles.

Jermyn grew up in the Hancock Park neighborhood of Los Angeles. A star athlete in high school, he was drafted by the Kansas City Royals in 1969. He attended Pepperdine University and played a year for a minor-league team. In the late 1970s he began to suffer from schizophrenia, for which he refuses to take medication. In the 1980s he began his current practice of skating about and dancing to music dressed in spandex on the streets of West Los Angeles, where he is a well-known fixture.

In October 2007, a group of entrepreneurs marketed a clothing label with stylized images of Jermyn. The label was developed with the cooperation of Jermyn, who receives royalties from its sales.
