= St Mary's Church, Ickworth =

Church in the United Kingdom

Coordinates: 52.2184°N 0.6518°E

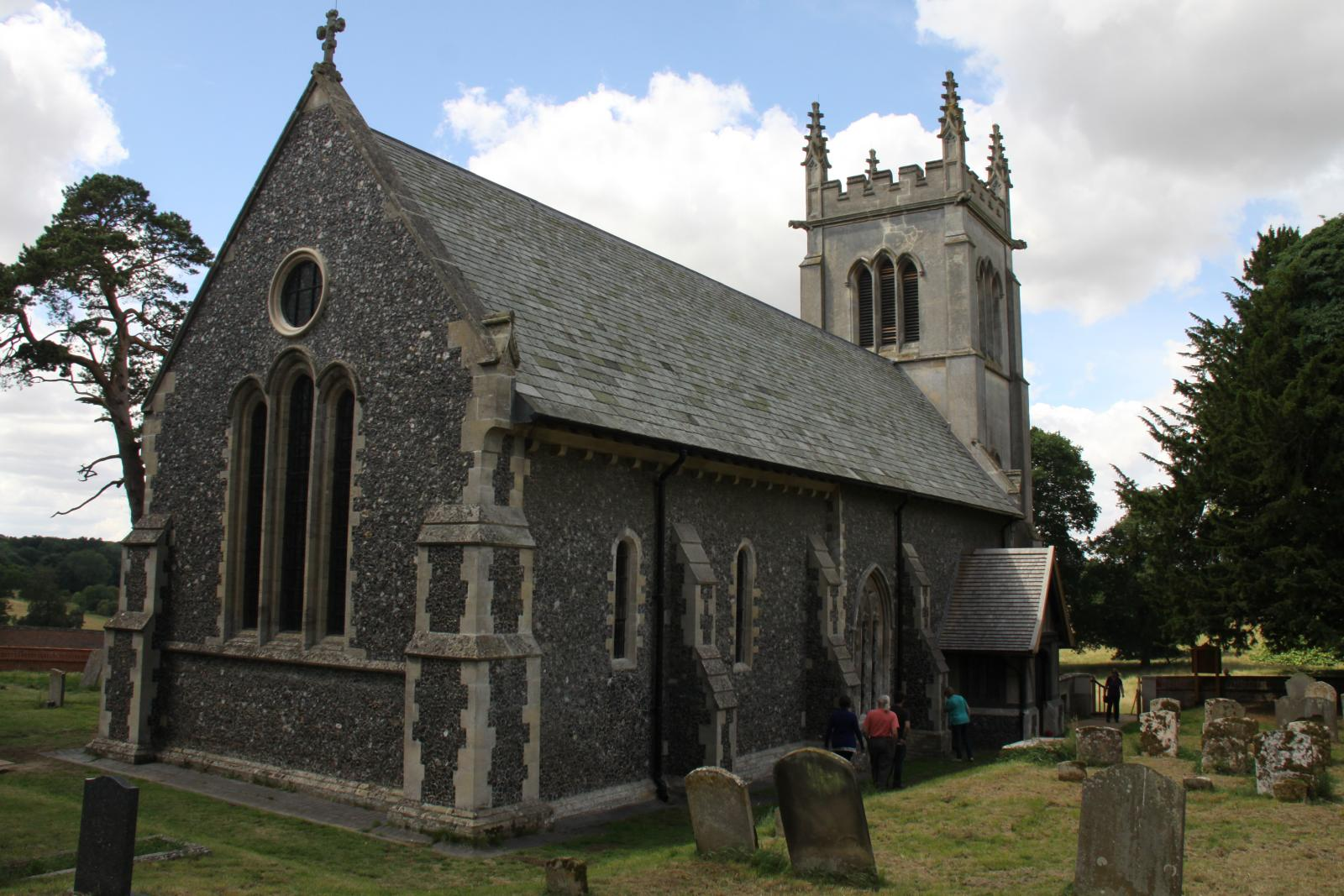
St Mary's Church, Ickworth

Ickworth Church (more formally known as St Mary's Church, Ickworth) is a former parish church in Ickworth Park near Bury St Edmunds in Suffolk, England.

== History ==
The church is within view of Ickworth House, now owned by the National Trust. The church served Ickworth village, which no longer exists. With the growth of the Ickworth Estate, the church became mainly associated with those living and working in Ickworth House and its Park. It is also the main burial place of the Hervey family, who owned and lived at Ickworth from the mid 15th century to 1998.

== Church fabric ==
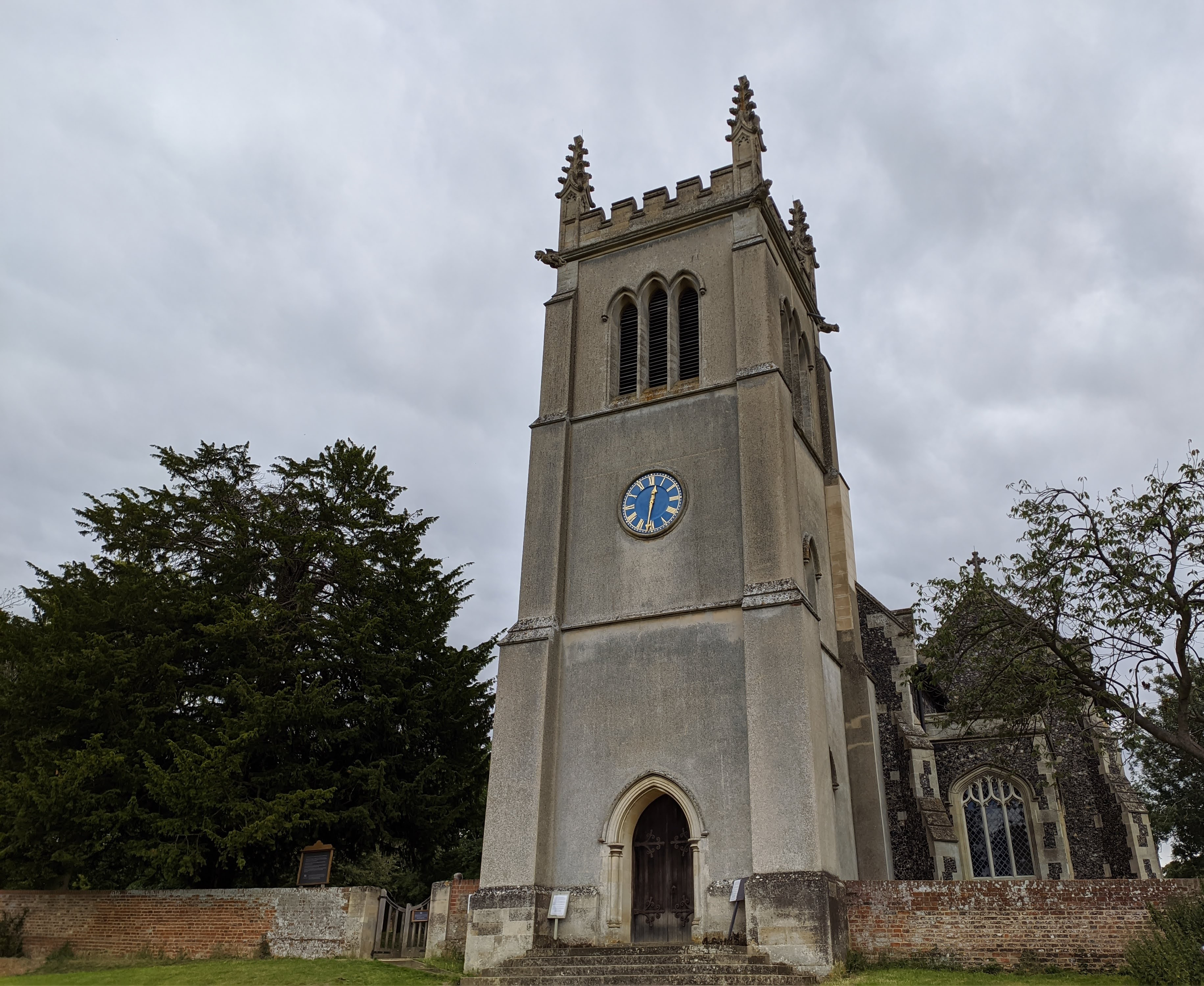
The front of the church

The church is medieval with major 19th-century alterations. The chancel is mid C13, the north nave doorway is C13 or C14. The chancel has a C15 restored south nave window. Other features include: a C15 plain Octagonal limestone font. A C17 octagonal pulpit, converted around 1775 into a 3-decker with balustrading and original graining. Twenty C17 and C18 marble wall and floor slabs in the chancel, many with carved achievements to members of the Hervey family. Fourteen C17 and C18 wall tablets in the nave to members of the Hervey family and others. A C15 red-line wall painting of the angel of the Annunciation on the east wall of chancel. Roundels of painted Flemish glass dating from C14-C19.

== Hervey family tombs ==
The Herveys, who owned Ickworth for almost 500 years, are buried in the vault under the church and in the churchyard. The line of those laid to rest here begins with Thomas Hervey (d. 1467), who was the first of this family to own Ickworth. After him, almost every Earl and every Marquess of Bristol has been buried there, as were many of their daughters and wives. The 6th Marquess (d. 1985) was buried in Menton (France) for 25 years until the 8th Marquess had him reinterred in the vault of Ickworth Church in October 2010.

== The Ickworth Church Conservation Trust (ICCT) ==
The ICCT was set up by the 8th Marquess of Bristol to safeguard the future of Ickworth Church. His half-brother the 7th Marquess bought the church from the Church Commissioners (after they made it redundant in the 1970s) in 1986, after which it fell into a state of disrepair. The 8th Marquess created the ICCT in 2006, and transferred ownership of the Church to the ICCT, of which he is Trustee and chairman. The Church has now been restored and is open to the public after a lengthy restoration project costing £1.2 million.

== Popular culture ==
Prior to the restoration of the church, it was visited by writer and television producer Steven Moffat who used the chained-up gates and statues in various states of disrepair in the churchyard as inspiration for popular Doctor Who monsters the Weeping Angels, first introduced in the 2007 episode "Blink".
