= Horringer =

Village in West Suffolk, England

Coordinates: 52.223°N 0.673°E

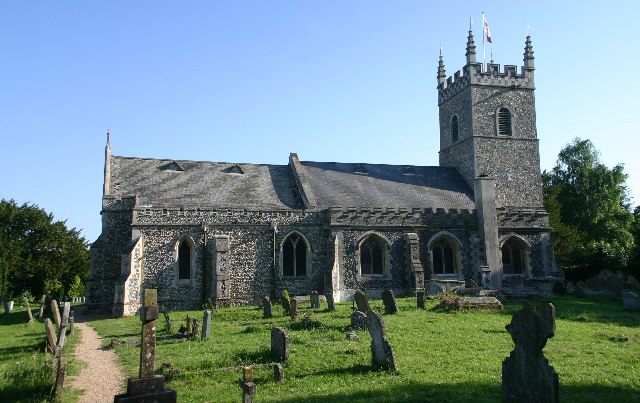
- St Leonard's Church, Horringer

- Location within Suffolk
- Population: 1,055 (2011)
- District: West Suffolk
- Shire county: Suffolk
- Region: East
- Country: England
- Sovereign state: United Kingdom
- Post town: Bury St Edmunds
- Postcode district: IP29
- Dialling code: 01284
- Police: Suffolk
- Fire: Suffolk
- Ambulance: East of England
- UK Parliament: West Suffolk

Horringer, formerly also called Horningsheath, is a village and civil parish in the West Suffolk district of Suffolk in eastern England. It lies on the A143 about two miles south-west of Bury St Edmunds. The population in 2011 was 1,055.

== Heritage ==
Horringer was earlier known as Horningsheath. The school retained this spelling until after the Second World War.

The village includes the main entrance to Ickworth House, a Neoclassical country house which was the seat of the Earls and Marquesses of Bristol until the 7th Marquess sold the lease to the National Trust.

=== Notable residents ===
In birth order:

- Thomas Rogers (c. 1553–1616), a religious controversialist and cleric was the Rector of St Leonards, Horringer, from 1581 until his death.
- William Bedell (1571-1642), rector of Horringer 1616-1627, subsequently Provost of Trinity College Dublin and Lord Bishop of Kilmore, patron of the translation of the Old Testament into the Irish language.
- John Covel (1638-1722), clergyman and scientist who became Master of Christ's College, Cambridge and vice-chancellor of the University
- Elizabeth Cavendish, Duchess of Devonshire, born Elizabeth Christiana Hervey in Horringer on 13 May 1759, became a notable society hostess and patron of the arts. Her father, Frederick Hervey, 4th Earl of Bristol, later Bishop of Cloyne (1767–1768) and Bishop of Derry (1768–1803), believed in equality among religions.
- Melmoth Hall (1811–1885), born here, became a first-class cricketer in Australia.
- The remains of Victor Hervey, 6th Marquess of Bristol (1915–1985) were returned from Menton, France, by his son in 2010 for a funeral at Horringer before burial at St Mary's Church, Ickworth.

== Demography ==
According to the Office for National Statistics, the parish of Horringer at the time of the United Kingdom Census 2001 had a population of 901 in 397 households, which rose to 1,055 at the 2011 Census. The ward population of 2,593 in the 2011 Census was estimated at 2,617 in 2019.

=== Population change ===
Population change in Horringer from 1801 to 1891
Year	1801	1811	1821	1831	1841	1851	1881	1891
Population	543	523	539	586	597	670	662	599
Source: A Vision of Britain Through Time

Population change in Horringer from 1901 to 2001
Year	1901	1911	1921	1931	1951	1961	2001	2011
Population	525	552	569	545	465	468	901	1,055
Source: A Vision of Britain Through Time
