= Ickworth House =

Country house in Suffolk, England

Coordinates: 52.220320°N 0.656839°E

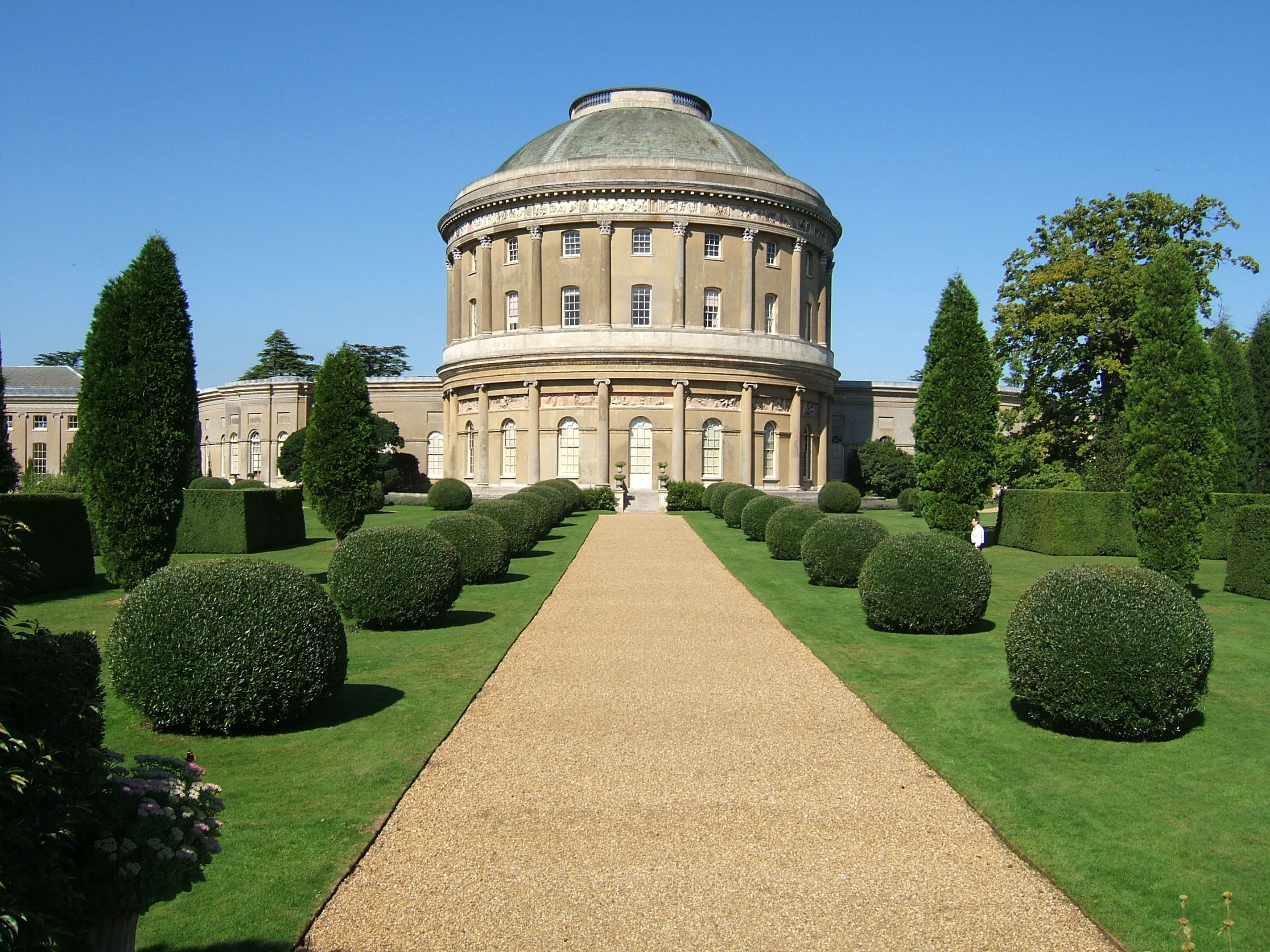
- Southern facade

- Location within Suffolk

General information
- Architectural style: Palladian
- Location: Ickworth, Suffolk, England
- Year built: 1795—1829
- Client: Frederick Hervey, 4th Earl of Bristol
- Owner: National Trust

Design and construction
- Architect: Mario Asprucci

Listed Building – Grade I
- Official name: Ickworth House
- Designated: 14 July 1955
- Reference no.: 1205300

National Register of Historic Parks and Gardens
- Official name: Ickworth House
- Designated: 1 June 1984
- Reference no.: 1000186

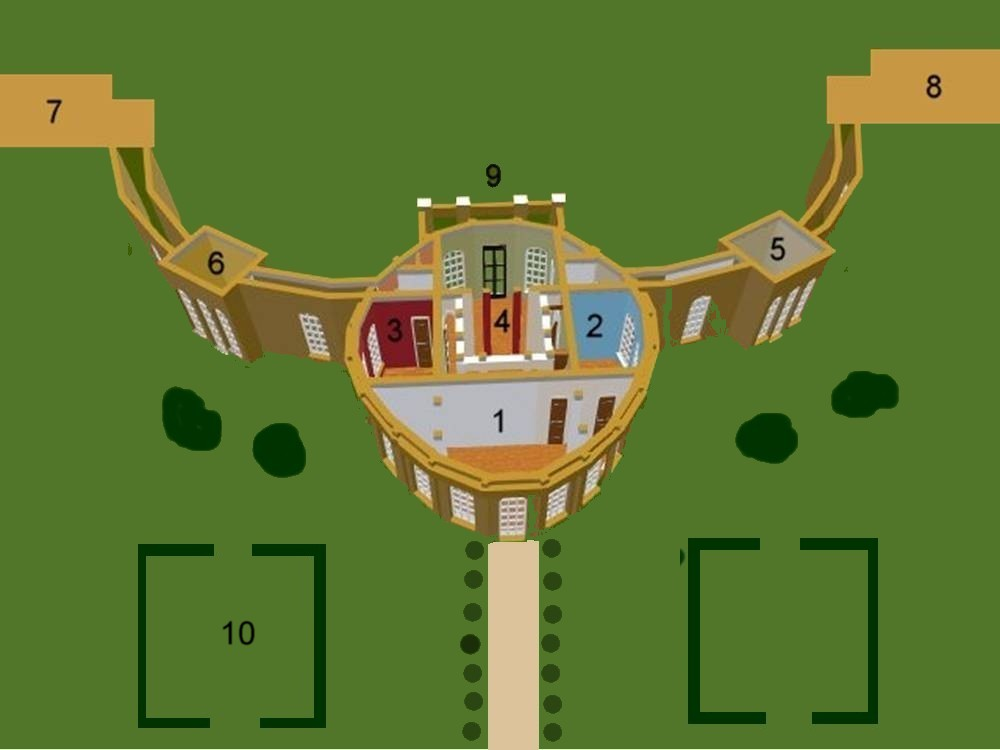
Ickworth House, the ground floor. 1: Library; 2: Drawing Room; 3: Dining Room; 4:Entrance and (inner) Staircase Hall; 5:Smoking Room; 6:Pompeian room; 7: Orangery and West Wing; 8: East (Family) Wing; 9: Portico; 10: Topiary Garden.

Ickworth House is a country house at Ickworth, near Bury St Edmunds in Suffolk, England. It is a neoclassical building set in parkland. The house was the residence of the Marquesses of Bristol until 1998; the house was given to the National Trust in 1956, but between then and 1998 the marquesses leased the east wing.

== History ==
The house, built between 1795 and 1829, was formerly the chief dwelling of an estate owned by the Hervey family, later Marquesses of Bristol, since 1467. The building was the creation of Frederick Hervey, 4th Earl of Bristol and Bishop of Derry (known as the Earl-Bishop), who commissioned the Italian architect Mario Asprucci to design him a classical villa in the Suffolk countryside. Originally it had been planned as an art gallery but the Earl's collection was seized by Napoleon. The Earl died in 1803, leaving the completion of house to his successor.

In 1956, the house, park, and a large endowment were given to the National Trust in lieu of death duties. As part of the handover agreement, a 99-year lease on the 60-room East Wing was given to the Marquess of Bristol. However, in 1998 the 7th Marquess of Bristol sold the remaining lease on the East Wing to the National Trust. He was succeeded by his half-brother Frederick William Augustus Hervey, 8th Marquess of Bristol (born 19 October 1979). The National Trust refused to sell the remaining lease term back to the 8th Marquess, thereby contravening the Letter of Wishes which states that the head of the family should always be offered whatever accommodation he chooses at Ickworth.

The family's once private East Wing is now run as The Ickworth Hotel on a lease from the National Trust. Apartments, also leased from the Trust, are located in the Dower House in the grounds.

The West Wing at Ickworth House went uncompleted until 2006, when a joint partnership between the National Trust and Sodexo Prestige led to its renovation and opening as a centre for conferences and events. The first wedding in the property's history took place in 2006.

== Architecture ==
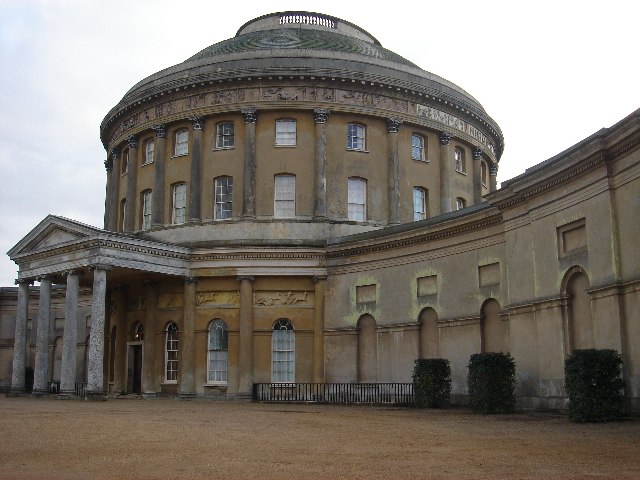
The entrance facade and ionic portico (9 on plan).

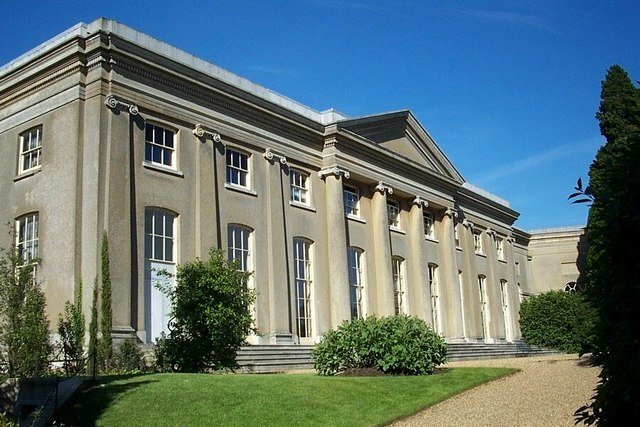
The West Wing; its interior remained unfinished until 2006

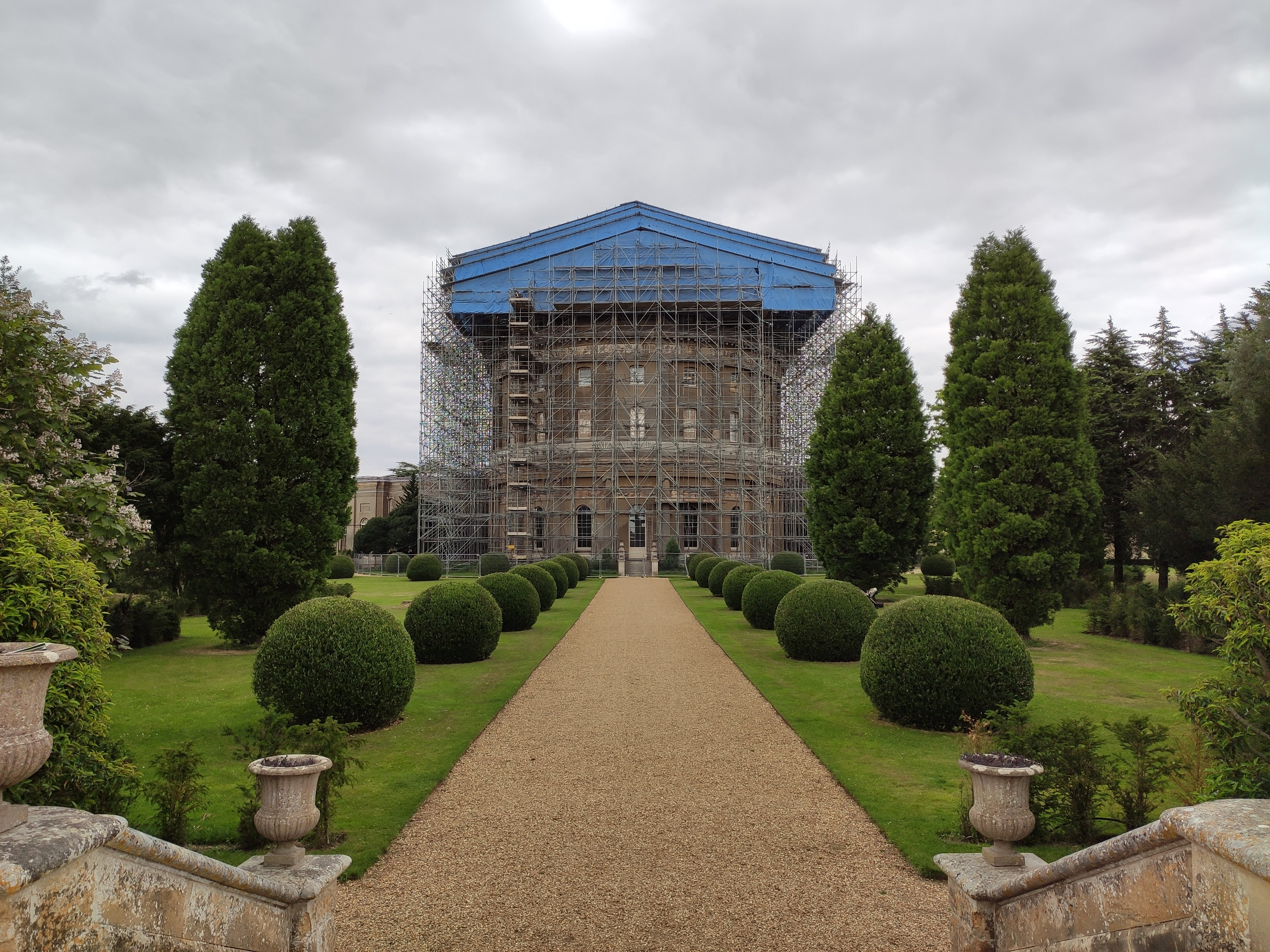
The renovation of the Rotunda, which started in 2019

As one of England's more unusual houses, Ickworth has been unflatteringly described as resembling "a huge bulk, newly arrived from another planet" and as "an overgrown folly". It is now being architecturally reassessed and recognised as the only building in England comparable with the monumental works of Boullée and Ledoux.

The design concept was based on the designs of Italian architect Antonio Asprucci, most noted for his work at the Villa Borghese, which the Bishop-Earl had seen. Asprucci's plans were adapted and the building work overseen by the Irish architects Francis Sandys and his brother Joseph Sandys.

The façades are of brick covered in stucco; beneath a roof of slate and lead. The central rotunda is 105 feet (32 m). high with a domed and balustraded roof. the building is entered through the central entrance ionic pedimented portico.

The rotunda is decorated with pilasters, which on the lower floor are Ionic and Corinthian above. The ground and first floor and the third floor and the balustraded parapet are divided friezes bas-relief.

The rotunda is flanked by segmental single story narrow wings (appearing as a blind arcade) linking, in the palladian fashion, to two terminating pavilions; these segmental wings are broken at their centre by projecting bays which house the Smoking Room and the Pompeian Room, both later 19th century additions.

Unlike the design of a true Palladian building, the terminating pavilions, rather than minor balancing appendages, are in fact large wings, complementary in weight to the rotunda which becomes their corps de logis. The East Wing, a small mansion in itself, was designed to be the everyday living quarters of the family (which it remained until 1998), thus permitting the more formal rooms of the rotunda to be reserved for entertaining and display. The west wing, intended as an orangery, sculpture gallery and service rooms remained an unfinished shell until the beginning of the 21st century. For much of the time it was used as agricultural storage and latterly for playing squash on a court installed by the 4th Marquess.

== Contents ==
The house has paintings by Velázquez, and Titian, as well as a series of 18th-century family portraits by artists such as Gainsborough, Reynolds, Vigee-Lebrun, Batoni, Angelica Kauffman, Ramsay, van Loo, and Hogarth. In addition, it has a collection of fine Georgian silver. The house also contains very good examples of Regency furniture, porcelain and 16th century maiolica. As well, Geraldine Hervey, Marchioness of Bristol used to collect elaborately decorated fans, and silver fishes.

== Ickworth Church ==
Most members of the Hervey family, from Thomas Hervey (d. 1467) up to the 7th Marquess of Bristol (d. 1999), have been buried at Ickworth Church, which is located in the Park, a short walk from the house. The church is Norman with some later additions, and possesses a 15th-century wall painting of the Angel of the Annunciation, a 15th-century font, and roundels of Flemish glass from as early as 14th century, as well as numerous marble achievements to different members of the Hervey family over the centuries. It remains in the hands of the Hervey family and has recently undergone repairs to make it safe with the help of a grant from English Heritage.

== The Park ==
Ickworth Park covers an area of over 1,800 acres (730 ha). The park contains "some of the finest ancient trees in the area." The Tea Party Oak, which is at least 800 years old, is located south of Ickworth Lodge and has a diameter of over 9 metres (30 ft). It is one of the county's oldest surviving oak trees. Another tree, in Albana Wood, is about 600 years old.
