= West Suffolk (constituency) =

UK Parliament constituency (1832–1885, 1997 onwards)

Coordinates: 52.25°N 0.54°E

- County constituency for the House of Commons
- Interactive map of boundaries since 2024
- Location within the East of England
- County: Suffolk
- Electorate: 76,243 (March 2020)
- Major settlements: Newmarket, Haverhill and Mildenhall

Current constituency
- Created: 1997
- Member of Parliament: Nick Timothy (Conservative)
- Seats: One
- Created from: Bury St Edmunds; South Suffolk

1832–1885
- Seats: Two
- Type of constituency: County constituency
- Created from: Suffolk
- Replaced by: Bury St Edmunds (also succeeded itself); North-Western or 'Stowmarket' Division; South or 'Sudbury' Division

West Suffolk is a constituency (Note: A county constituency (for the purposes of election expenses and type of returning officer)) represented in the House of Commons of the UK Parliament since 2024 by Nick Timothy, a Conservative. (Note: As with all constituencies, the constituency elects one Member of Parliament (MP) by the first past the post system of election at least every five years.)

Between 1832 and 1885 (then formally the Western Division of Suffolk), it was represented by two Members of Parliament, elected by the bloc vote system.

Following the Boundary Commission's fourth periodic review of Westminster constituencies, it was re-established as a single-member seat for the 1997 general election.

== Constituency profile ==
This area includes a slightly older demographic profile than the national average, with a significant proportion of semi-detached and detached homes and a higher than average proportion of retired people.

Major economic sectors include defence (RAF Mildenhall and RAF Lakenheath), agriculture/food (including for major products as well as regional specialities such as ales, Suffolk cider and cured meats), tourism and leisure (such as Newmarket racecourse) and particularly in Haverhill, a range of industries. These include chemicals (such as International Flavors and Fragrances), waste processing, transport, construction and pharmaceuticals.

Workless claimants who were registered jobseekers were in November 2012 lower than the national average of 3.8%, at 2.5% of the population based on a statistical compilation by The Guardian.

== History ==
=== 1832–1885 ===
The seat was created under the Reform Act 1832 as one of two divisions, together with the Eastern Division, of the Parliamentary County of Suffolk. This resulted in a more representative allocation, with a total of four MPs instead of two for the former entire county at large, which still allowed for double voting (or more) of those Forty Shilling Freeholders who also were householders or landlords of any particular boroughs within the county. This Act retained the four largest boroughs of the seven before 1832.

With two heirs to their title serving the seat, the Marquesses of Bristol, the Hervey family, were major landowners in the county. The modern seat is at Ickworth, with part of its grand house now being a luxury hotel.

Further sweeping changes took place as a result of the Redistribution of Seats Act 1885 which saw the 2 two-member Suffolk divisions being replaced by five single-member constituencies. The Western Division was largely replaced by the North-Western or Stowmarket Division and the Southern or Sudbury Division. A small area in the east was included in the North-Eastern or Eye Division.

=== 1997–present ===
Political history

The seat has only been represented by the Conservative Party, with the narrowest majority having been 3.8% in 1997. Since then, the Conservative majority has gradually increased to a level suggesting a safe seat for the party.

For the 2010 general election, the transition was planned six months before, on 23 November 2009, when the incumbent announced he would not stand again.

Prominent frontbenchers

Richard Spring (Note: Previously MP for the Bury St Edmunds seat) was an opposition spokesman for Foreign Affairs (2000-2004) (shadowing a Foreign and Commonwealth Office Minister) then Shadow Minister for the Treasury (2004-2005), before being a vice-chairman of his party and being elevated to the House of Lords as Lord Risby. Several of his ancestors had previously represented Suffolk in the House of Commons.

Matt Hancock, Spring's successor, became a government minister, serving under various positions from 2012 until the 2015 general election, when he was promoted to the Cabinet as Paymaster General and Minister for the Cabinet Office. After a short stint outside the Cabinet between 2016 and 2018, as a minister at the Department for Digital, Culture, Media and Sport, Hancock rejoined the Cabinet as Secretary of State for Digital, Culture, Media and Sport. He was promoted in July 2018, to serve as Secretary of State for Health and Social Care; this ended in 2021, when he resigned from this position following an affair with his aide Gina Coladangelo, which at the time breached COVID-19 social distancing rules. As he had announced in December 2022, he stood down from parliament at the dissolution in advance of the 2024 United Kingdom general election.

== Boundaries and boundary changes ==
=== Historic ===
==== 1832–1885 ====
- The Liberty of Bury St. Edmund's, and the Hundreds of Hartesmere, and Stow.

==== 1997–2010 ====
- The District of Forest Heath; and
- The Borough of St Edmundsbury wards of Barningham, Barrow, Cangle, Castle, Chalkstone, Chevington, Clements, Honington, Horringer, Hundon, Ixworth, Kedington, Risby, St Mary's and Helions, Stanton, Wickhambrook, and Withersfield.

The re-established constituency was formed primarily from the majority (including Newmarket) of the constituency of Bury St Edmunds, which was reconfigured. It was extended southwards, incorporating westernmost areas of South Suffolk, including Haverhill.

Map of boundaries 2010–2024

==== 2010–2024 ====
- The District of Forest Heath; and
- The Borough of St Edmundsbury wards of Bardwell, Barningham, Barrow, Chedburgh, Haverhill East, Haverhill North, Haverhill South, Haverhill West, Hundon, Ixworth, Kedington, Risby, Stanton, Wickhambrook, and Withersfield.

Marginal changes due to revision of local authority wards.

With effect from 1 April 2019, the District of Forest Heath and the Borough of St Edmundsbury were abolished and absorbed into the District of West Suffolk.

=== Current ===
Further to the 2023 review of Westminster constituencies, which came into effect for the 2024 general election, the composition of the constituency is as follows (as they existed on 1 December 2020):

- The District of West Suffolk wards of: Barrow; Brandon Central; Brandon East; Brandon West; Chedburgh & Chevington; Clare, Hundon & Kedington; Exning; Haverhill Central; Haverhill East; Haverhill North; Haverhill South; Haverhill South East; Haverhill West; Horringer; Iceni; Kentford & Moulton; Lakenheath; Manor; Mildenhall Great Heath; Mildenhall Kingsway & Market; Mildenhall Queensway; Newmarket East; Newmarket North; Newmarket West; Risby; The Rows; Whepstead & Wickhambrook; Withersfield.

The four wards (Bardwell, Barningham, Ixworth and Stanton) in the north-eastern corner of the seat were moved to the newly named constituency of Bury St Edmunds and Stowmarket, partly offset by small transfers in from Bury St Edmunds and South Suffolk.

The constituency includes the town of Newmarket, a global centre of horse racing, as well as the towns of Haverhill and Mildenhall, with a farmed landscape, interspersed with patches of forest (Note: For example Thetford Forest, synonymous with Breckland.) and small villages.

== Members of Parliament ==
=== MPs 1832–1885 ===
Election	Member	Party	Member	Party
1832	Charles Tyrell	Whig	Sir Hyde Parker, Bt	Whig
1835	Henry Wilson	Whig	Robert Rushbrooke	Conservative
1837	Robert Hart Logan	Conservative	Robert Rushbrooke	Conservative
1838 by-election	Harry Spencer Waddington	Conservative	Robert Rushbrooke	Conservative
1845 by-election	Harry Spencer Waddington	Conservative	Philip Bennet	Conservative
1859	Frederick Hervey (Note: This is the courtesy title given to the eldest son of the Marquess of Bristol as his main subsidiary title.)	Conservative	William Parker	Conservative
1864 by-election	Lord Augustus Hervey	Conservative	William Parker	Conservative
June 1875 by-election	Fuller Maitland Wilson	Conservative	William Parker	Conservative
October 1875 by-election	Thomas Thornhill	Conservative	William Parker	Conservative
1880	Thomas Thornhill	Conservative	William Biddell	Conservative
1885	constituency abolished			

=== MPs from 1997 ===
Bury St Edmunds and South Suffolk prior to 1997

Election	Member	Party
1997	Richard Spring	Conservative
2010	Matt Hancock	Conservative
2022	Matt Hancock	Independent
2024	Matt Hancock	Conservative
2024	Nick Timothy	Conservative

== Elections results since 1997 ==
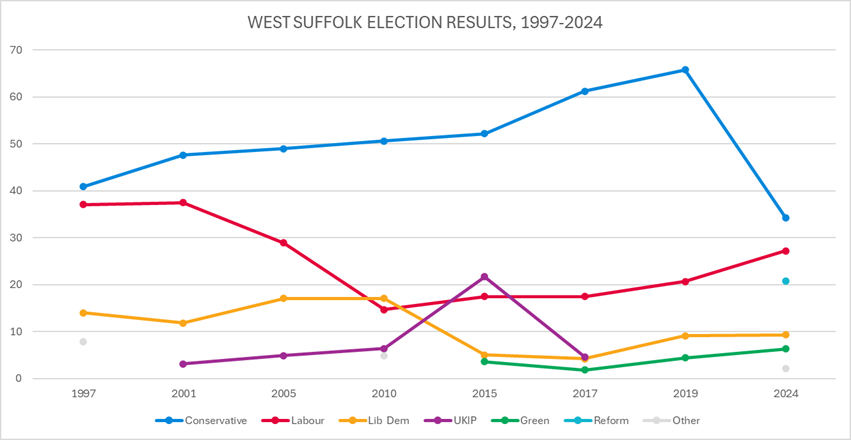
Election results 1997–2024

=== Elections in the 2020s ===
General election 2024: West Suffolk
Party	Candidate	Votes	%	±%
Conservative	Nick Timothy	15,814	34.3	−30.0
Labour	Rebecca Denness	12,567	27.2	+5.0
Reform	David Bull	9,623	20.8	N/A
Liberal Democrats	Henry Batchelor	4,284	9.3	+0.3
Green	Mark Ereira-Guyer	2,910	6.3	+1.8
Independent	Katie Parker	485	1.1	N/A
Independent	Luke O'Brien	345	0.7	N/A
SDP	Ivan Kinsman	133	0.3	N/A
Majority		3,247	7.1	−35.1
Turnout		46,161	59.8	−4.6
Registered electors		77,149		
Conservative hold		Swing	−17.5	

=== Elections in the 2010s ===
2019 notional result
Party	Vote	%
Conservative	31,738	64.3
Labour	10,941	22.2
Liberal Democrats	4,462	9.0
Green	2,199	4.5
Turnout	49,340	64.7
Electorate	76,243	

General election 2019: West Suffolk
Party	Candidate	Votes	%	±%
Conservative	Matt Hancock	33,842	65.8	+4.6
Labour	Claire Unwin	10,648	20.7	−7.5
Liberal Democrats	Elfreda Tealby-Watson	4,685	9.1	+4.9
Green	Donald Allwright	2,262	4.4	+2.6
Majority		23,194	45.1	+12.1
Turnout		51,437	64.1	−2.8
Registered electors		80,192		+3.7
Conservative hold		Swing	+6.1	

General election 2017: West Suffolk
Party	Candidate	Votes	%	±%
Conservative	Matt Hancock	31,649	61.2	+9.0
Labour	Michael Jefferys	14,586	28.2	+10.7
UKIP	Julian Flood	2,396	4.6	−17.1
Liberal Democrats	Elfreda Tealby-Watson	2,180	4.2	−0.8
Green	Donald Allwright	935	1.8	−1.8
Majority		17,063	33.0	+2.5
Turnout		51,746	66.9	+2.3
Registered electors		77,348		
Conservative hold		Swing	−0.9	

General election 2015: West Suffolk
Party	Candidate	Votes	%	±%
Conservative	Matt Hancock	25,684	52.2	+1.6
UKIP	Julian Flood	10,700	21.7	+15.3
Labour	Michael Jefferys	8,604	17.5	+2.8
Liberal Democrats	Elfreda Tealby-Watson	2,465	5.0	−18.4
Green	Niall Pettitt	1,779	3.6	N/A
Majority		14,984	30.5	+3.3
Turnout		49,232	64.6	−0.1
Conservative hold		Swing	−6.9	

General election 2010: West Suffolk
Party	Candidate	Votes	%	±%
Conservative	Matt Hancock	24,312	50.6	+1.7
Liberal Democrats	Belinda Brooks-Gordon	11,262	23.4	+6.2
Labour	Ohid Ahmed	7,089	14.7	−14.2
UKIP	Ian Smith	3,085	6.4	+1.5
BNP	Ramon Johns	1,428	3.0	N/A
Independent	Andrew Appleby	540	1.1	N/A
CPA	Colin Young	373	0.8	N/A
Majority		13,050	27.2	+7.0
Turnout		48,089	64.7	+3.9
Conservative hold		Swing	−2.3	

=== Elections in the 2000s ===
General election 2005: West Suffolk
Party	Candidate	Votes	%	±%
Conservative	Richard Spring	21,682	49.0	+1.4
Labour	Michael Jeffreys	12,773	28.9	−8.6
Liberal Democrats	Adrian Graves	7,573	17.1	+5.3
UKIP	Ian Smith	2,177	4.9	+1.8
Majority		8,909	20.1	+10.0
Turnout		44,205	60.7	+0.2
Conservative hold		Swing	+5.0	

General election 2001: West Suffolk
Party	Candidate	Votes	%	±%
Conservative	Richard Spring	20,201	47.6	+6.7
Labour	Michael Jefferys	15,906	37.5	+0.4
Liberal Democrats	Robin Martlew	5,017	11.8	−2.2
UKIP	Will Burrows	1,321	3.1	N/A
Majority		4,295	10.1	+6.3
Turnout		42,445	60.5	−11.0
Conservative hold		Swing	+3.1	

=== Elections in the 1990s ===
General election 1997: West Suffolk
Party	Candidate	Votes	%	±%
Conservative	Richard Spring	20,081	40.9	
Labour	Michael Jefferys	18,214	37.1	
Liberal Democrats	Adrian Graves	6,892	14.0	
Referendum	James Carver	3,724	7.6	
Natural Law	Alistair Shearer	171	0.3	
Majority		1,867	3.8	
Turnout		49,082	71.5	
Conservative win (new seat)				

== Election results 1832–1885 ==
=== Elections in the 1830s ===
General election 1832: West Suffolk
Party	Candidate	Votes	%
Whig	Charles Tyrell	1,832	38.4
Whig	Hyde Parker	1,664	34.9
Tory	Harry Spencer Waddington	1,272	26.7
Majority		392	8.2
Turnout		2,920	87.8
Registered electors		3,326	
Whig win (new seat)			
Whig win (new seat)			

General election 1835: West Suffolk
Party	Candidate	Votes	%	±%
Whig	Henry Wilson	1,723	27.6	−10.8
Conservative	Robert Rushbrooke	1,655	26.5	+13.2
Conservative	Robert Hart Logan	1,509	24.2	+10.9
Whig	John Turner Hales	1,350	21.6	−13.3
Turnout		3,256	87.3	−0.5
Registered electors		3,731		
Majority		68	1.1	−7.1
Whig hold		Swing	−11.4	
Majority		146	2.3	N/A
Conservative gain from Whig		Swing	+12.6	

General election 1837: West Suffolk
Party	Candidate	Votes	%	±%
Conservative	Robert Hart Logan	2,217	29.7	+5.5
Conservative	Robert Rushbrooke	2,173	29.1	+2.6
Whig	Henry Bunbury	1,560	20.9	−0.7
Whig	Henry Wilson	1,505	20.2	−7.4
Majority		613	8.2	+5.9
Turnout		3,810	76.8	−10.5
Registered electors		4,959		
Conservative hold		Swing	+4.8	
Conservative gain from Whig		Swing	+3.3	

Logan's death caused a by-election.

By-election, 7 May 1838: West Suffolk
Party	Candidate	Votes	%
Conservative	Harry Spencer Waddington	Unopposed	
Conservative hold			

=== Elections in the 1840s ===
General election 1841: West Suffolk
Party	Candidate	Votes	%	±%
Conservative	Harry Spencer Waddington	Unopposed		
Conservative	Robert Rushbrooke	Unopposed		
Registered electors		5,091		
Conservative hold				
Conservative hold				

Rushbrooke's death caused a by-election.

By-election, 7 July 1845: West Suffolk
Party	Candidate	Votes	%	±%
Conservative	Philip Bennet	Unopposed		
Conservative hold				

General election 1847: West Suffolk
Party	Candidate	Votes	%	±%
Conservative	Harry Spencer Waddington	Unopposed		
Conservative	Philip Bennet	Unopposed		
Registered electors		4,913		
Conservative hold				
Conservative hold				

=== Elections in the 1850s ===
General election 1852: West Suffolk
Party	Candidate	Votes	%	±%
Conservative	Harry Spencer Waddington	Unopposed		
Conservative	Philip Bennet	Unopposed		
Registered electors		4,379		
Conservative hold				
Conservative hold				

General election 1857: West Suffolk
Party	Candidate	Votes	%	±%
Conservative	Harry Spencer Waddington	Unopposed		
Conservative	Philip Bennet	Unopposed		
Registered electors		4,084		
Conservative hold				
Conservative hold				

General election 1859: West Suffolk
Party	Candidate	Votes	%	±%
Conservative	Frederick Hervey	1,958	42.2	N/A
Conservative	William Parker	1,379	29.7	N/A
Conservative	Philip Bennet	1,300	28.0	N/A
Majority		79	1.7	N/A
Turnout		2,319 (est)	55.6 (est)	N/A
Registered electors		4,172		
Conservative hold				
Conservative hold				

=== Elections in the 1860s ===
Hervey succeeded to the peerage, becoming 3rd Marquess of Bristol and causing a by-election.

By-election, 8 December 1864: West Suffolk
Party	Candidate	Votes	%	±%
Conservative	Augustus Hervey	Unopposed		
Conservative hold				

General election 1865: West Suffolk
Party	Candidate	Votes	%	±%
Conservative	Augustus Hervey	Unopposed		
Conservative	William Parker	Unopposed		
Registered electors		4,269		
Conservative hold				
Conservative hold				

General election 1868: West Suffolk
Party	Candidate	Votes	%	±%
Conservative	William Parker	2,500	37.9	N/A
Conservative	Augustus Hervey	2,389	36.2	N/A
Liberal	Charles Lamport	1,705	25.9	New
Majority		684	10.3	N/A
Turnout		4,150 (est)	74.3 (est)	N/A
Registered electors		5,583		
Conservative hold				
Conservative hold				

=== Elections in the 1870s ===
General election 1874: West Suffolk
Party	Candidate	Votes	%	±%
Conservative	Augustus Hervey	Unopposed		
Conservative	William Parker	Unopposed		
Registered electors		5,949		
Conservative hold				
Conservative hold				

Hervey's death caused a by-election.

June 1875 West Suffolk by-election
Party	Candidate	Votes	%	±%
Conservative	Fuller Maitland Wilson	2,780	72.4	N/A
Liberal	Charles Easton	1,061	27.6	New
Majority		1,719	44.8	N/A
Turnout		3,841	66.1	N/A
Registered electors		5,811		
Conservative hold				

Wilson's death caused a by-election.

October 1875 West Suffolk by-election
Party	Candidate	Votes	%	±%
Conservative	Thomas Thornhill	Unopposed		
Conservative hold				

=== Elections in the 1880s ===
General election 1880: West Suffolk
Party	Candidate	Votes	%	±%
Conservative	William Biddell	Unopposed		
Conservative	Thomas Thornhill	Unopposed		
Registered electors		5,700		
Conservative hold				
Conservative hold				

== See also ==
- List of parliamentary constituencies in Suffolk
- List of parliamentary constituencies in the East of England (region)
