= Compton-Thornhill baronets =

Extinct baronetcy in the Baronetage of the United Kingdom

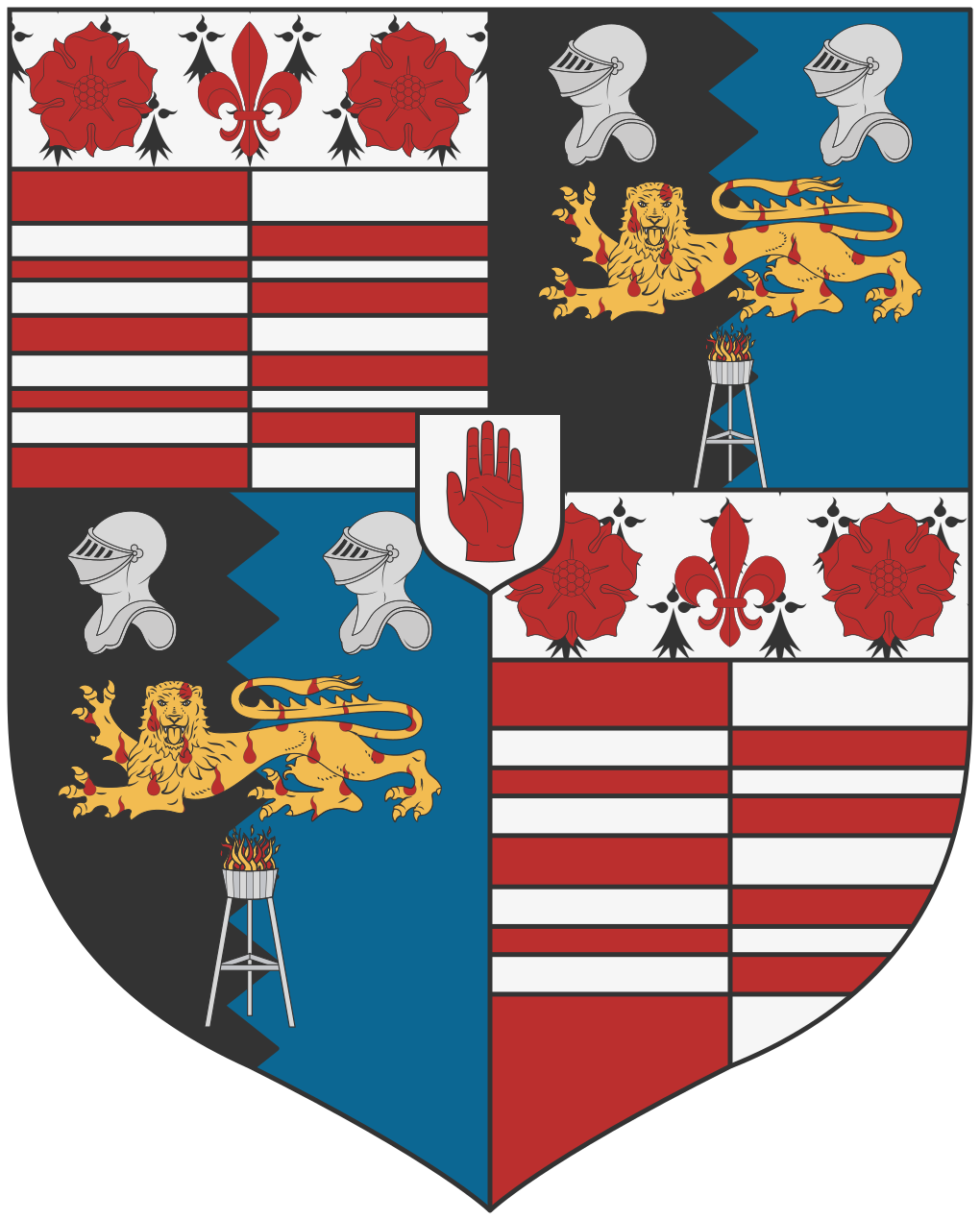
Arms of Compton-Thornhill of Riddlesworth Hall and of Pakenham

The Thornhill, later Compton-Thornhill Baronetcy, of Riddlesworth Hall in the Parish of Riddlesworth in the County of Norfolk and of Pakenham Lodge in the Parish of Pakenham in the County of Suffolk, was a title in the Baronetage of the United Kingdom. It was created on 11 August 1885 for Thomas Thornhill, Conservative Member of Parliament for West Suffolk from 1875 to 1885.

The 2nd Baronet assumed the additional surname of Compton on 9 May 1901. The title became extinct on his death in 1949.

== Thornhill, later Compton-Thornhill baronets, of Riddlesworth Hall and of Pakenham Lodge (1885) ==
- Sir Thomas Thornhill, 1st Baronet (1837–1900)
- Sir Anthony John Compton-Thornhill, 2nd Baronet (1868–1949), left no heir.

== See also ==
- Thornhill baronets

Baronetage of the United Kingdom
| Preceded by Fowler baronets | Thornhill baronets of Riddlesworth Hall and Pakenham Lodge; 11 August 1885 | Succeeded by Corry baronets |
