= West Suffolk Militia =

English Militia regiment (1759–1881)

West Suffolk Militia 3rd Battalion, Suffolk Regiment
- Active: 27 April 1759–1 April 1953
- Country: Kingdom of Great Britain (1759–1800); United Kingdom (1801–1953)
- Branch: Militia/Special Reserve
- Type: Infantry
- Role: Infantry
- Size: 1 Battalion
- Part of: Suffolk Regiment
- Garrison/HQ: Gibraltar Barracks, Bury St Edmunds
- Anniversaries: Minden Day (adopted 1889)

Commanders
- Notable commanders: Augustus FitzRoy, 3rd Duke of Grafton; George FitzRoy, 4th Duke of Grafton; Frederick Hervey, 2nd Marquess of Bristol; Brig-Gen Samuel Eyre Massy Lloyd

The West Suffolk Militia was an auxiliary (Note: It is incorrect to describe the British Militia as 'irregular': throughout their history they were equipped and trained exactly like the line regiments of the regular army, and once embodied in time of war they were fulltime professional soldiers for the duration of their enlistment.) military unit in the English county of Suffolk in East Anglia. First organised during the Seven Years' War it served on internal security and home defence duties in all of Britain's major wars. It later became a battalion of the Suffolk Regiment and supplied thousands of recruits to the fighting battalions during World War I. After 1921 the militia had only a shadowy existence until its final abolition in 1953.

== Background ==
The universal obligation to military service in the Shire levy was long established in England and its legal basis was updated by two acts of 1557 (4 & 5 Ph. & M. c. 3 and 4 & 5 Ph. & M. c. 2), which placed selected men, the 'Trained Bands', under the command of lords-lieutenant appointed by the monarch. This is seen as the starting date for the organised county militia in England. It was an important element in the country's defence at the time of the Spanish Armada in the 1580s, and control of the militia was one of the areas of dispute between King Charles I and Parliament that led to the English Civil War. The Suffolk Trained Bands were active in the Siege of Colchester and Battle of Worcester, and later in controlling the country under the Commonwealth and Protectorate. The English militia was re-established under local control in 1662 after the Restoration of the monarchy, and the Suffolk Militia played a prominent part in the Second Dutch War of 1667. However, after the Peace of Utrecht in 1715 the militia was allowed to decline.

== West Suffolk Militia ==
Under threat of French invasion during the Seven Years' War a series of Militia Acts from 1757 re-established county militia regiments, the men being conscripted by means of parish ballots (paid substitutes were permitted) to serve for three years. There was a property qualification for officers, who were commissioned by the lord lieutenant. Suffolk was given a quota of 960 men to raise. The militia was strongly supported by the new Lord Lieutenant of Suffolk, the 3rd Duke of Grafton, and the county was one of the first to raise its quota. Grafton was ordered organise his men into two battalions as the 1st or Western Battalion at Bury St Edmunds under Colonel the 'Honourable Nassau', (Note: Probably the Hon Richard Nassau, later 5th Earl of Rochford. He may have only been Lt-Col, because the Duke of Grafton was later in personal command as colonel.) and the 2nd or East Suffolk Battalion at Ipswich commanded by Col Francis Vernon of Orwell Park. The government would only issue arms from the Tower of London to militia regiments when they had enrolled 60 per cent of their quota: for the two Suffolk regiments this was on 27 April 1759, which was taken as their official date of formation. The regiments were embodied for full-time service on 16 October 1759.

At the end of 1759 the Suffolk Militia regiments made their first marches outside the county, which was a novel experience for most of the junior officers and men. The West Suffolks went to Peterborough and Oundle. On 14 October 1760 both regiments marched back to Bury St Edmunds and went into winter quarters in their home county, the West Suffolks in Sudbury. In May 1761 the West Suffolks marched to Hilsea outside Portsmouth, where it suffered much sickness. In October it returned to winter quarters in Suffolk, at Sudbury, Ballingdon and Lavenham. In June 1762 the battalion concentrated at Bury St Edmunds. With the Seven Years War drawing to a close, Grafton was instructed on 20 December 1762 to disembody the Suffolk Militia, which was carried out for the West Suffolks on 24 December. Annual training continued thereafter, and officers were commissioned to fill vacancies.

=== War of American Independence ===
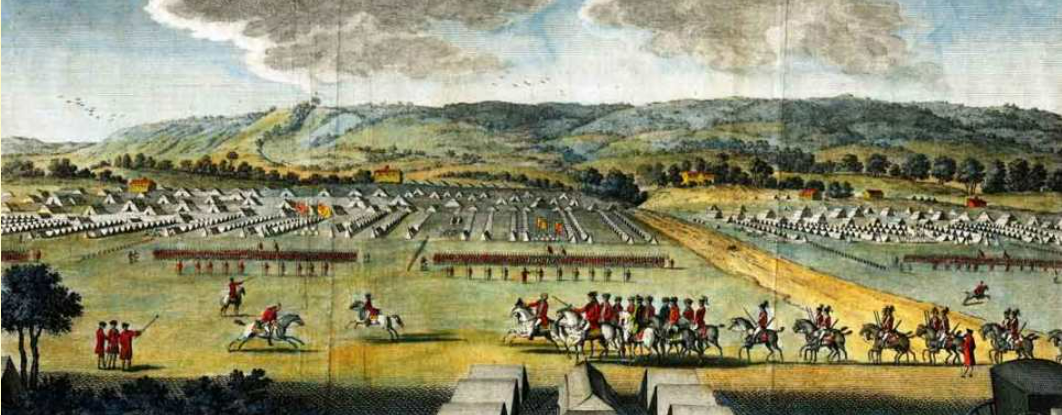
Coxheath Camp in 1778.

The militia was called out after the outbreak of the War of American Independence when the country was threatened with invasion by the Americans' allies, France and Spain. On 26 March 1778 Grafton was ordered to embody the two regiments once more. On 24 May the West Suffolks marched out to Sudbury, Long Melford and Lavenham, and on 2 June reached Coxheath near Maidstone in Kent. During the summer of 1778 the West Suffolk Militia, commanded by the Duke of Grafton, formed part of a concentration at Coxheath Camp, which was the army's largest training camp. Here the completely raw militia were exercised as part of a division alongside regular troops while providing a reserve in case of French invasion of South East England. The West Suffolks formed part of the Right Wing under Maj-Gen William Amherst. The Duke of Grafton was chosen to train the grenadier companies of the battalions in camp, and he worked them hard, 7–8 hours a day. The intention had been to form four composite grenadier battalions and deploy them in 'flying encampments' along the likely invasion coast, but there is no evidence that this was actually carried out. Observers of the camp noted that the discipline of the West Suffolk Militia under Grafton was especially good.

The regiment returned to winter quarters in Bury St Edmunds on 7 November 1778. The following spring it moved into neighbouring Essex, by 3 April seven companies were distributed between Chelmsford, Springfield and Moulsham, and the other company split between Bromfield, Woodford and Writtle Green. On 5 July the whole regiment was sent to camp at Warley Common in Essex, another large training encampment. In 1778 Parliament had permitted militia regiments to be augmented by voluntary enlistment to the extent of once additional company, and when the Warley encampment broke up on 26 November, the West Suffolks had a ninth company. These were distributed across Hertfordshire for winter quarters: Battalion headquarters (HQ) and 3 companies to Hitchin, 2 to Hatfield and Bell Bar, 1 between Welwyn, Codicote and Lemsford Mills, 2 to Stevenage and 1 to Baldock.

The Duke of Grafton resigned his commission on grounds of ill-health in February 1780 and on 2 June 1780 his 20-year-old son and heir, George, Earl of Euston, was commissioned as colonel of the West Suffolk Militia. On 28 April that year the West Suffolks went to North East England, first to Newcastle upon Tyne, then from 10 May at Kingston upon Hull for the summer. ON 30 October it took up winter quarters at Newcastle (3 companies), Alnwick (3), and between Morpeth, Bedlington and Blyth (3). During the summer of 1781 the regiment was at Warley Camp once more from 1 June to 30 October, and then (now only 8 companies again) wintered in its home county of Suffolk, at Newmarket (HQ and 4 companies), Mildenhall and Barton Mills (1), Stowmarket and Needham Market (2), and between Botesdale and Ixworth (1). It was camped at Danbury Common in Essex for the summer of 1782 (5 July to 8 November) under the command of Major-General St John, and then wintered in Suffolk and Cambridgeshire: Newmarket, All Saints (Halesworth) and Woodditton (4 companies), Bury St Edmunds (3), and Mildenhall, Barton Mills and Brandon (1). By the end of 1782 a peace treaty had been agreed and the war was coming to an end, so orders to disembody the Suffolk Militia were issued on 4 March 1783.

From 1784 to 1792 the militia were supposed to assemble for 28 days' annual training, even though to save money only two-thirds of the men were actually called out each year. In 1786 the number of permanent NCOs was reduced.

=== French Revolutionary Wars ===
The militia was already being called out when Revolutionary France declared war on Britain on 1 February 1793. The order to embody the Suffolk Militia had gone out on 4 December 1792. Each of the Suffolk battalions was to consist of eight companies, one of which was a light company. They were also issued with two light 'battalion guns'. Lord Euston reported that substitutes would be unwilling to serve if their families were not eligible for the allowances given to balloted men, and so they were included in the Militia Bill before Parliament.

The French Revolutionary Wars saw a new phase for the English militia: they were embodied for a whole generation, and became regiments of full-time professional soldiers (though restricted to service in the British Isles), which the regular army increasingly saw as a prime source of recruits. They served in coast defences, manning garrisons, guarding prisoners of war, and for internal security, while their traditional local defence duties were taken over by the Volunteers and mounted Yeomanry.

On 14 January 1793 the West Suffolk Militia travelled to Hilsea, outside Portsmouth, and then on 19 June to join a large militia encampment at Broadwater Common, Waterdown Forest, outside Tunbridge Wells. The whole camp moved to Ashdown Forest at the beginning of August and then to Brighton for two weeks before returning to Broadwater Common. After the camp broke up, the West Suffolks were quartered in Hampshire and Surrey, at Farnham (3 companies), Alton, Chawton and Farringdon (3), and Alresford (2). By November there were also detachments at Arundel in Sussex, Bentley and Aldershot, and in March and April 1794 companies were detached to Petersfield, Odiham, Elvetham and Harslem.

With a French invasion possible, the Government augmented the strength of the embodied militia in early 1794: the West Suffolks by 63 men, recruited by voluntary enlistment and paid for by county subscriptions. That summer the West Suffolks were in camp at Brighton from 12 May to October. When they marched out they left behind their battalion guns, and on arrival at Margate in Kent on 29 October they took over those of the 1st Somerset Militia who had been camped on Barham Downs. The battalion wintered with 10 separate detachments around Margate. It then returned to Brighton on 13 May 1795, where it took over its own guns once more. In June that year it was part of a large camp at Warley under Lieutenant-General Cornwallis.

In October 1795 the regiment was sent into Berkshire and Buckinghamshire for its winter quarters, with 4 companies sent to High and West Wycombe, the other 4 distributed between Maidenhead, Marlow, and Bexham, with HQ first at Marlow, then at Maidenhead. On 29 April 1796 it was sent to quarters in Uxbridge in Middlesex, with several outlying detachments, before going to Warley Camp on 8 June for the summer. When the camp broke up in October the regiment marched back to Bury St Edmunds for the winter. On 17 February 1797 the militia were directed to be formed into brigades for their summer training. The West Suffolks, together with the Cambridgeshires, East Norfolks and Warwickshires, formed 2nd Brigade of Gen Sir William Howe's Division. On 20 March the West Suffolks went to Ipswich, and then in July to Colchester, returning to Ipswich on 27 January 1798.

In a fresh attempt to have as many men as possible under arms for home defence in order to release regulars, the Government created the Supplementary Militia in 1796, a compulsory levy of men to be trained in their spare time, and to be incorporated in the Militia in emergency. Suffolk's additional quota was fixed at 1470 men, and these were called out at Ipswich on 31 January 1798, where the West Suffolks had just arrived and could train them. The West Suffolks together with their supplementary battalion returned to Colchester in March. The purpose of the call-out was to replace militiamen who had volunteered to transfer to the Regular Army, and to augment the embodied militia, the West Suffolks' new establishment being 1125 all ranks in 10 companies.

=== Ireland ===
Part of the reason for the augmentation was the Militia (No. 4) Act 1798 passed in March allowing the English militia to volunteer for service in Ireland, where a rebellion had broken out. The West Suffolk Militia volunteered for this service and embarked at Rockhouse Ferry under Col the Earl of Euston on 10 September, leaving a detachment in England in charge of the heavy baggage. After arriving at Dublin the regiment was marched to Dundalk, where it served until June 1799, while the last embers of the rebellion were put down. Meanwhile, the detachment at home had gone to Huntingdon and then taken the baggage to the great depot at Norman Cross. In April 1799 it was moved to Chelmsford.

On 10 June 1799 the West Suffolks embarked at Warrenpoint aboard a series of small ships for England, with a strength of 20 officers, 656 other ranks (ORs), 46 women and 8 children. It went to Chelmsford to join the home detachment. The reunited battalion move to Cambridge on 21 November. By now the danger of invasion seemed to have passed, and the militia were reduced, the West Suffolks from 10 to 7 companies. On 5 December the 'supernumerary detachment' was marched to Newmarket to be disembodied. Lord Euston's application to retain two 'flank companies' (Grenadiers and Light) was rejected, since only one was allowed for a battalion of 7 companies.

From 29 December the West Suffolks wintered at Sudbury, moving on 4 May 1800 to Bury St Edmunds and then to Colchester on 15 March 1801. William Parker, (later Sir William Parker, 7th Baronet of Melford Hall) was appointed Lieutenant-Colonel of the West Suffolks on 25 March 1801, and he commanded the battalion when it was inspected at Colchester on 15 April 1801. With a strength of 25 officers and 471 ORs, it was reported as being 'in every respect fit for service'. It wintered at Ipswich from 20 September. However, the French Revolutionary War was drawing to a close, and hostilities ended with the Treaty of Amiens on 27 March 1802. The West Suffolks were marched to Bury St Edmunds, where on 14 April warrants were issued to disembody both regiments of Suffolk Militia.

=== Napoleonic Wars ===
However, the Peace of Amiens was short-lived and Britain declared war on France once more in 1803 when both Suffolk Militia regiments were re-embodied on 12 May. The West Suffolks at Bury St Edmunds had a new establishment of 30 officers, 28 sergeants, 19 drummers and 547 rank and file, still under the command of the Earl of Euston. Militia duties during the Napoleonic Wars were much as before: home defence and garrisons, guarding prisoners of war, and increasingly internal security in the industrial areas where there was unrest. Increasingly the regular army regarded the militia as a source of trained men and many militiamen took the proffered bounty and transferred, leaving the militia regiments to replace them through the ballot or 'by beat of drum'.

After mobilising, the West Suffolks marched to Ipswich on 28 May, then spent the summer from 3 August camped at Thorington Heath. From here it provided picquets and patrols to watch the Essex coast from Brightlingsea to Walton-on-the-Naze for the threatened French invasion. In November it moved into Colchester for the winter, and by 11 July 1804 was at Ipswich. In August 1804 it went into camp at Lexden, just outside Colchester, before returning to that town for the next winter. In February 1805 it went back to Ipswich and remained there for over next two years. During the summer of 1805, when Napoleon was massing his 'Army of England' at Boulogne for a projected invasion, the regiment, with 608 men in 10 companies under the command of Lt-Col William Parker, was stationed at Ipswich Barracks as part of Lt-Gen Lord Charles Fitzroy's brigade. While there the regiment took part in a grand review on Rushmere Heath in 1805 before the Commander-in-Chief, the Duke of York. In August 1807 men of the regiment were invited to volunteer for the 10th, 48th and 63rd Foot; by 1814 the regiment had supplied 33 officers and 1145 ORs to the regular army, even though its establishment was only increased to 711 ORs in 1808. On 5 October 1807 the regiment went briefly to Chatham, Kent, but spent most of the winter at Ipswich. The Earl of Euston reigned his command and Lt-Col Parker was promoted to succeed him on 1 February 1808.

=== Luddites ===
After spending the first years of the war in East Anglia, the regiment moved to Northern England in 1808, firstly to Tynemouth, then moving in June 1810 to Sunderland. On 17 October 1810 it moved to Liverpool where it stayed throughout 1811. Luddite disturbances broke out in West Yorkshire in 1812, and the regiment was moved there on 20 August, with orders to cover the country to the west and north of Halifax, including the whole of Bradford Vale. Patrols went out by day and night to prevent meetings of the disaffected and to give confidence to the inhabitants. The West Suffolks remained in West Yorkshire, at Wakefield in December 1812, until on 11 March 1813 the regiment moved north to Berwick and Tweedmouth.

=== Ireland again ===
The Interchange Act 1811 allowed English militia regiments to serve in Ireland (and vice versa) for a period of up to two years. Leaving a detachment at Berwick, the West Suffolks marched to Portpatrick where on 13 April 1813 it embarked with a strength of 20 officers, 26 sergeants, 19 drummers, 390 rank and file, 44 women and 20 children. It disembarked on 2 May and reached Armagh next day.

The West Suffolks served at Armagh until 14 December when it marched in two 'divisions' to Tullamore for the winter, arriving on 20–21 December 1813. The Napoleonic War ended with the Treaty of Paris on 30 May 1814 and preparations began to disembody the militia. In July the home detachment of the West Surreys was ordered to begin its march from Berwick to Bury St Edmunds. The battalion was relieved at Tullamore by the North Mayo Militia on 29 August and marched to Dublin next day. It embarked on 31 August for Bristol, where it arrived on 5 September and marched in two divisions to Suffolk. It reached Bury St Edmunds on 24 September and was disembodied on 4 October. The regiment was not re-embodied for the short Waterloo campaign in 1815.

=== Long Peace ===
After Waterloo there was another long peace. Although officers continued to be commissioned into the militia and ballots were still held until they were suspended by the Militia Act 1829, the regiments were rarely assembled for training and the permanent staffs of sergeants and drummers (who were occasionally used to maintain public order) were progressively reduced.

Colonel Sir William Parker died in 1830 and Henry, Earl of Euston (later 5th Duke of Grafton) transferred from the colonelcy of the East Suffolk Militia to succeed him on 24 May 1830. The duke resigned in 1845 and was succeeded by his son, William, Earl of Euston, on 24 December, but he was replaced by Earl Jermyn (later 2nd Marquess of Bristol) on 25 March 1846.

== 1852 reforms ==
The Militia of the United Kingdom was revived by the Militia Act 1852, enacted during a renewed period of international tension. As before, units were raised and administered on a county basis, and filled by voluntary enlistment (although conscription by means of the Militia Ballot might be used if the counties failed to meet their quotas). Training was for 56 days on enlistment, then for 21–28 days per year, during which the men received full army pay. Under the Act, Militia units could be embodied by Royal Proclamation for full-time home defence service in three circumstances:

1. 'Whenever a state of war exists between Her Majesty and any foreign power'.
2. 'In all cases of invasion or upon imminent danger thereof'.
3. 'In all cases of rebellion or insurrection'.

The West Suffolk Militia began its first training under the new Act on 19 September 1853 at Bury St Edmunds under Col Earl Jermyn.

=== Crimean War ===
War having broken out with Russia in 1854 and an expeditionary force sent to the Crimea, the militia began to be called out for home defence. The West Suffolk Militia was embodied on 14 December 1854 and was billeted in Bury St Edmunds, with Angel Hill designated as its night alarm post. The 1852 reforms had abolished the position of colonel in militia regiments; in future the commanding officer (CO) would be a lieutenant-colonel. Earl Jermyn retired on 3 August 1855 and was appointed Honorary Colonel of the regiment, with Lt-Col George Deare, a former Lt-Col in the 21st Foot as CO.

The West Suffolks moved to Colchester on 19 February 1856, where the regiment was disembodied on 6 June, having supplied 3 officers and 226 ORs as volunteers to the regular army during its embodiment.

Thereafter the militia regiments were called out for their annual training. The permanent staff at Bury St Edmunds acted as recruiters for the regular army. The Militia Reserve introduced in 1867 consisted of present and former militiamen who undertook to serve overseas in case of war. The regiment was issued with the Enfield Rifled Musket at the end of 1859, and then with the breechloading Snider–Enfield in 1870. On the death of Lt-Col Deare on 27 March 1870, Major Fuller Maitland Wilson was promoted to succeed him from 9 April.

== Cardwell and Childers reforms ==
Under the 'Localisation of the Forces' scheme introduced by the Cardwell Reforms of 1872, militia regiments were brigaded with their local regular and Volunteer battalions. Sub-District No 32 (Suffolk & Cambridge) set up its depot at the County Buildings in Bury St Edmunds, headquarters of the West Suffolk Militia. It comprised:

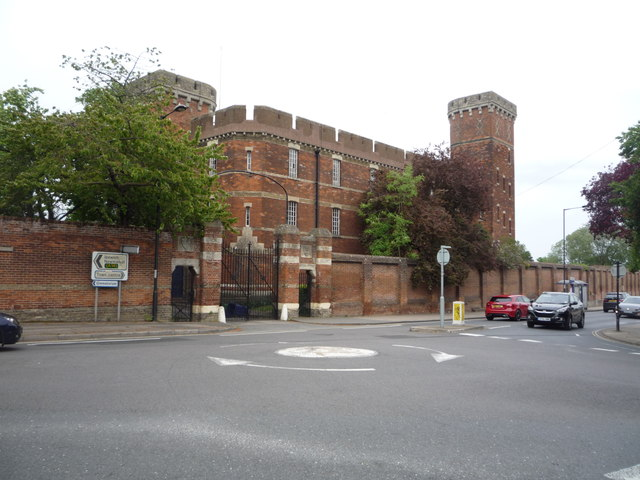
Gibraltar Barracks, Bury St Edmunds.

- 1st and 2nd Battalions, 12th (East Suffolk) Regiment of Foot
- West Suffolk Militia
- Cambridgeshire Militia at Ely
- 1st Administrative Battalion, Suffolk Rifle Volunteer Corps at Sudbury
- 2nd Administrative Battalion, Suffolk Rifle Volunteer Corps at Woodbridge
- 3rd Administrative Battalion, Suffolk Rifle Volunteer Corps at Lowestoft
- 1st Administrative Battalion, Cambridgeshire Rifle Volunteer Corps at Cambridge
- 3rd (Cambridge University) Cambridgeshire Rifle Volunteer Corps at Cambridge

Gibraltar Barracks, was opened at Bury St Edmunds as the new depot for the sub-district in 1878. The militia now came under the War Office rather than their county lords lieutenant. Around a third of the recruits and many young officers went on to join the regular army.

Following the Cardwell Reforms a mobilisation scheme began to appear in the Army List from December 1875. This assigned Regular and Militia units to places in an order of battle of corps, divisions and brigades for the 'Active Army', even though these formations were entirely theoretical, with no staff or services assigned. The West Suffolk Militia were assigned to 2nd Brigade of 2nd Division, VII Corps. The brigade would have mustered at Northampton in time of war. (Note: The Army List for the 1870s also lists a 'West Suffolk Reg' as providing the militia artillery for the Harwich defences: this is clearly an error for the Suffolk Artillery Militia derived from the East Suffolk Light Infantry.)

In 1878 the Militia Reserve was called out because of international tensions over the Russo-Turkish War, and 144 men of the West Suffolks did duty that summer with the 2nd Battalion, 12th Foot at Gosport. In July the West Suffolk and Cambridgeshire Militia were brigaded with the 2nd Battalion when it was inspected on Southsea Common by the Commander-in-Chief, the Duke of Cambridge.

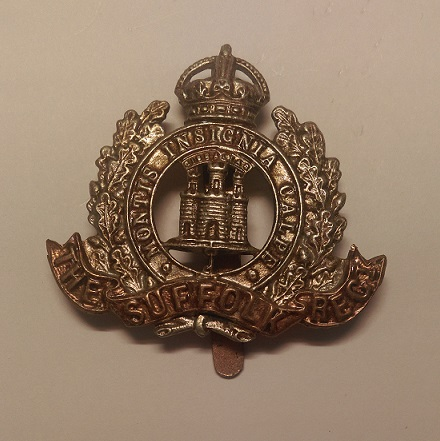
Cap badge of the Suffolk Regiment.

The Childers Reforms of 1881 completed the Cardwell process by converting the linked regular battalions into county regiments and incorporating the militia battalions into them, The 12th Foot became the Suffolk Regiment and the militia were redesignated:

- 3rd (West Suffolk Militia) Battalion, Suffolk Regiment
- 4th (Cambridge Militia) Battalion, Suffolk Regiment

When an expeditionary force was sent to the Anglo-Egyptian War in 1882, the West Suffolk Militia volunteered for overseas service, but the offer was not taken up. Until 1886 annual training was normally held at Bury St Edmunds, but in 1886 and 1888 this was carried out at Colchester Garrison. In 1889 it was held at Aldershot Camp where the 2nd (Regular), 3rd (West Suffolk Militia) and 4th (Cambridge Militia) battalions of the Suffolks were brigaded together. In the following years the 3rd Bn frequently went to Colchester for annual training, often preceded by a musketry course on the range at Landguard Fort. The 1899 training was at Great Yarmouth, brigaded with the Norfolk Militia.

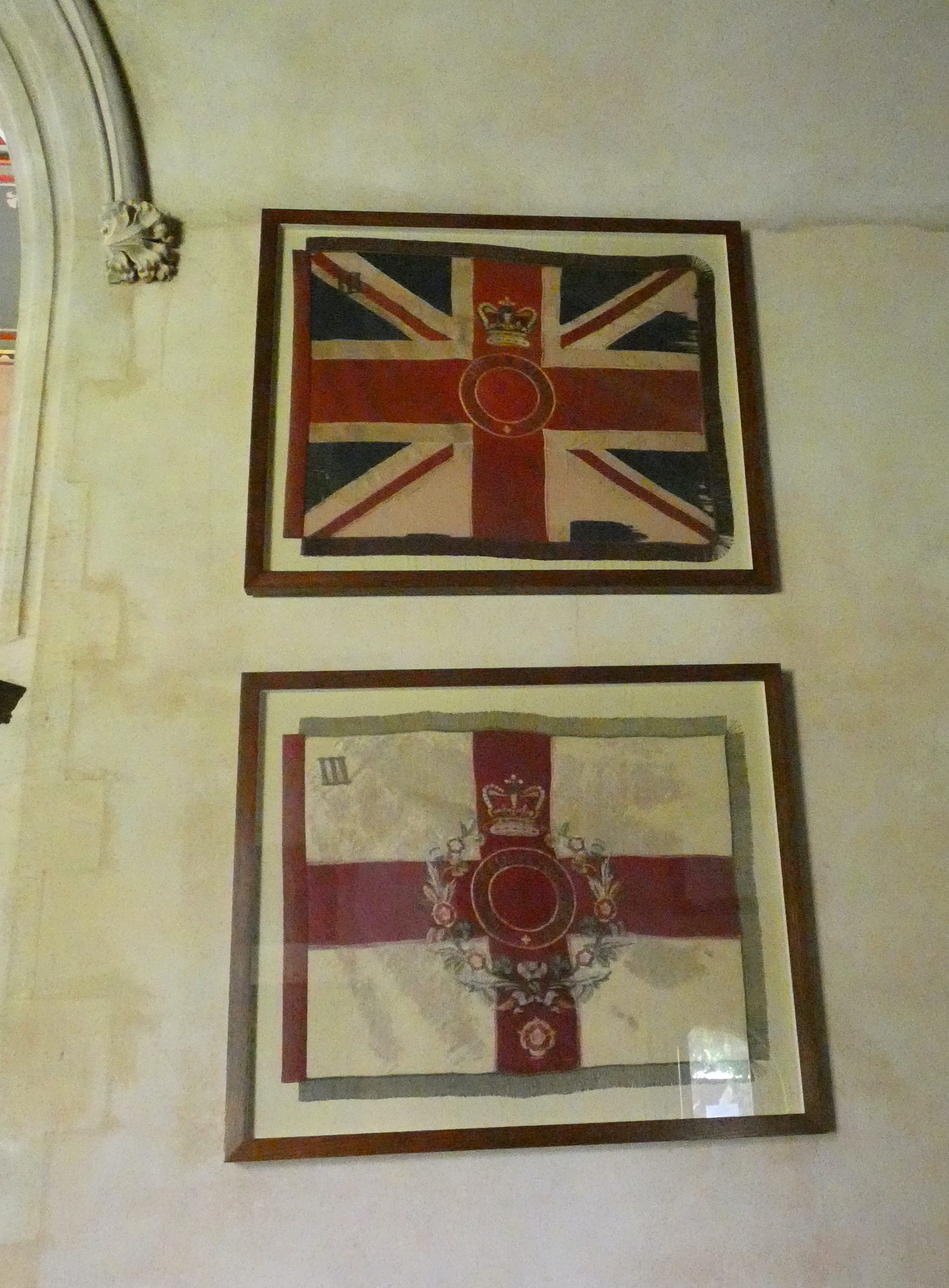
Regimental Colours (carried 1884–1912) of the 3rd Bn, Suffolk Regiment, in St Mary's Church, on the Ickworth Estate of the battalion's late honorary colonel, Frederick Hervey, 3rd Marquess of Bristol.

=== Second Boer War ===
After the disasters of Black Week in December 1899 at the start of the Second Boer War, most of the regular army was sent to South Africa, and many militia units were embodied to replace them for home defence and to garrison certain overseas stations. The 3rd Suffolks were embodied on 4 December 1899 under the command of Lt-Col R. Norton and immediately went to Dover, where they were quartered in South Front Citadel and Burgoyne Barracks. About 80 per cent of the battalion volunteered for overseas service and on 5 January 1900 it left Dover by rail for Southampton where it embarked for the Channel Islands. Headquarters and Left Half Battalion (13 officers and 293 ORs) went to garrison Guernsey while Right Half Battalion (8 officers and 245 ORs) went to Alderney (the two half battalions exchanged postings after six months).

On 3 May the battalion was ordered to provide a draft of 50 Militia Reservists to join a reinforcement draft for the 1st Bn Suffolks fighting in South Africa. A further draft of 55 Militia Reservists was ordered on 16 June to reinforce the 1st and 2nd Bns Manchester Regiment in South Africa. In late August a second draft went out to the 1st Bn Suffolks, bringing the number of men from the 3rd Bn on active service to 147, and in October another 84 men transferred to the regular army. The 3rd Bn was kept up to strength by recruits from the depot. It left the Channel Islands for the mainland on 30 April 1901 and proceeded to Colchester where it was quartered at Sobraon Barracks. Here it supplied a party of 5 officers, 5 sergeants, 2 drummers and 142 rank and file for training as Mounted infantry (MI), and afterwards they formed 'No 4, the Suffolk Company of Mounted Infantry'.

On 3 July 1901 the battalion entrained for Bury St Edmunds, where it was disembodied. At that time 123 ORs of the battalion were still serving in South Africa. A number of officers had been seconded to the MI in South Africa, or to the South African Constabulary, and Lt-Col Norton and several other officers remained on service in the UK with provisional battalions. Captain the Hon George Cadogan of the 3rd Suffolks also went to South Africa on 'Special Service'.

However, the war dragged on and 3rd Bn Suffolks was re-embodied on 24 February 1902 and quartered at Meanee Barracks, Colchester. Brevet Major Samuel Eyre Massy Lloyd returned home from commanding a company with the 1st Bn in South Africa to become the regular adjutant of the 3rd Bn. On 14 March the battalion went via Holyhead to Ireland, where it was quartered at Wellington Barracks, Dublin. The Peace of Vereeniging having been signed on 31 May, the remaining militia reservists with the battalion were discharged on 1 July. The battalion left Dublin on 26 September and the following morning it was disembodied at Bury St Edmunds.

3rd Battalion Suffolks resumed annual training in 1903, camping outside Colchester. In the following years it camped on its drill field at Bury St Edmunds and at Landguard for musketry training.

== Special Reserve ==
After the Boer War, the future of the Militia was called into question. There were moves to reform the Auxiliary Forces (Militia, Yeomanry and Volunteers) to take their place in the six Army Corps proposed by the Secretary of State for War, St John Brodrick. However, little of Brodrick's scheme was carried out. Under the more sweeping Haldane Reforms of 1908, the Militia was replaced by the Special Reserve (SR), a semi-professional force whose role was to provide reinforcement drafts for regular units serving overseas in wartime, rather like the earlier Militia Reserve.

The 3rd Battalion transferred to the SR on 7 June 1908 becoming the 3rd (Reserve) Battalion, Suffolk Regiment. From 25 June 1910 the battalion was commanded by Lt-Col Massy Lloyd, its former adjutant, now retired from the army.

== World War I ==
=== 3rd (Reserve) Battalion ===
On the outbreak of World War I the mobilisation order reached 3rd Bn Suffolks at Bury St Edmunds on the afternoon of 4 August 1914 and the battalion and depot staff immediately began preparations to receive the army reservists who were being called up. By the end of 5 August nearly 900 men had been medically examined, clothed, equipped, fed and accommodated. By 7 August they had been sent to join the 2nd Bn Suffolks in Ireland. The special reservists had been instructed to join on 8 August, and at 02.30 next day the 3rd Bn marched out under the command of Lt-Col Massy Lloyd to entrain for its war station at Felixstowe. There it relieved 4th Bn Essex Regiment, a Territorial Force unit that had been carrying out its annual training at Felixstowe. Together with the SR battalions of the Norfolk Regiment, Bedfordshire Regiment, Essex Regiment and Loyal North Lancashire Regiment, the 3rd Bn Suffolks formed an SR brigade in the Harwich Defences.

The first task for the battalion was to dig entrenchments and erect barbed wire to supplement the defences, after which intensive training began. As well as defence tasks, its role was to equip the Reservists and Special Reservists of the Suffolks and send them as reinforcement drafts to the regular battalions serving overseas: the 1st, which arrived at Felixstowe from the Sudan in November 1914 before sailing to France and then Salonika, the 2nd on the Western Front. The first reinforcement draft for the 2nd Bn left Felixstowe as early as 26 August, followed by a group of officers to replace the heavy casualties suffered at the Battle of Le Cateau. Once the pool of reservists had dried up, the 3rd Bn trained thousands of raw recruits for the active service battalions. By the end of 1914 the strength of the battalion had reached 115 officers and 2600 ORs and eventually peaked at 201 officers and 4285 ORs. However the demands for drafts was incessant and the battalion was always short of instructors, at one point borrowing them from the London Metropolitan Police. It also retrained other troops for the infantry, including a large draft received from the 13th Reserve Cavalry Regiment in the spring of 1915, who were formed into their own company. Under War Office Instruction 106 of 10 November 1915 the 3rd Bn was ordered to send a draft of 109 men to the new Machine Gun Training Centre at Grantham where they were to form the basis of a brigade machine-gun company of the new Machine Gun Corps. In addition, 10 men at a time were to undergo training at Grantham as battalion machine gunners. The order stated that 'Great care should be taken in the selection of men for training as machine gunners as only well educated and intelligent men are suitable for this work'.

In January 1916 Lt-Col Massy Lloyd was sent on temporary duty to the Western Front, his second-in-command, Major F.E. Allfrey, taking charge. In January 1917 Lt-Col Massy Lloyd was promoted to Brevet Colonel, and in April he was appointed to command the Felixstowe District in the rank of Brigadier-General, when Maj Allfrey was promoted to command the 3rd Bn. No invasion force ever threatened the Harwich Defences during the war, but from January 1915 German airships and later aircraft were sometimes seen passing over the coast. On 4 July and 22 July 1917 squadrons of aircraft bombed the Felixstowe area, causing numerous casualties among the garrison. On 4 July there were five men killed and ten injured. On 22 July the battalion suffered further casualties with two men killed and two injured.

Hostilities ended on 11 November 1918 with the Armistice with Germany. During the war over 1000 officers and 33,000 ORs had passed through the 3rd Bn. Demobilisation now began, Lt-Col Allfrey leaving in February 1919 and being temporarily replaced by Maj R.B. Unwin until Lt-Col V.C. Gauntlett of the King's Regiment (Liverpool) arrived to take command on 1 May. On 7 March the battalion entrained to join the Eastern Counties Reserve Brigade at Rugeley Camp, with a strength of 38 officers and 756 ORs, leaving another 56 officers and 2385 ORs at Felixstowe. From Rugeley the battalion was called upon to provide a company to take charge of prisoners of war awaiting repatriation. Simultaneously with demobilisation, recruiting was going on for the peacetime British Army. In April the 3rd Bn furnished a draft for units in Egypt. In July 1919 Lt-Col A.S. Peebles and a nucleus of the 2nd Bn Suffolks arrived at Rugeley Camp and took over the remaining personnel and stores of the 3rd Bn. The 3rd Battalion Suffolk Regiment was then disembodied on 27 July 1919.

=== 10th (Reserve) Battalion ===
After Lord Kitchener issued his call for volunteers in August 1914, the battalions of the 1st, 2nd and 3rd New Armies ('K1', 'K2' and 'K3' of 'Kitchener's Army') were quickly formed at the regimental depots. The SR battalions also swelled with new recruits and were soon well above their establishment strength. On 8 October 1914 each SR battalion was ordered to use the surplus to form a service battalion of the 4th New Army ('K4'). Accordingly, two recruit companies were split off from the 3rd (Reserve) Bn in early October 1914 to form the nucleus of the 10th (Service) Bn Suffolk Regiment. The other battalions of the Special Reserve Bde at Harwich carried out a similar process, and the K4 battalions of the Norfolks, Suffolks, Bedfords and Loyals constituted 94th Brigade in 31st Division. Initially the men of the 10th Bn had to drill and provide working parties for the coast defences in old red coats with dummy rifles until uniforms and equipment arrived. The 10th Bn was billeted in quarters along the seafront at Felixstowe. In early 1915 an outbreak of Cerebrospinal meningitis in 94th Bde at Felixstowe caused the battalions to be scattered, the 10th going to the Suffolks' regimental depot at Bury St Edmunds and to billets in the town. In April 1915 the War Office decided to convert the K4 battalions into 2nd Reserve units, providing drafts for the K1–K3 battalions in the same way that the SR was doing for the Regular battalions. The Suffolk battalion became 10th (Reserve) Battalion, and 94th Bde became 6th Reserve Brigade, which re-assembled at Colchester in May 1915. 10th (Reserve) Bn later absorbed the depot companies of the 12th (Service) Bn Suffolk Regiment (East Anglian), a K5 'Bantam battalion' formed at Bury St Edmunds in July 1915. As well as training drafts, the battalion had to provide a flying column for coast defence, and pickets for all the main roads leading into Colchester. In March 1916 the brigade returned to the Harwich defences, being quartered at Dovercourt, with 10th Bn responsible for the coast defences for 3 miles (4.8 km) south from Dovercourt pier. At its peak the battalion reached a strength of 100–150 officers and 2000 ORs. However, on 1 September 1916 the 2nd Reserve battalions were transferred to the Training Reserve (TR) and the battalion amalgamated with 11th (Reserve) Bn, Essex Regiment to form 26th Training Reserve Bn, though the training staff retained their Suffolk badges. This battalion was redesignated 252nd (Infantry) Bn, TR, on 4 July 1917 and joined 213th Bde in 71st Division at Colchester. On 27 October it transferred to the Bedfordshire Regiment as 52nd (Graduated) Battalion. When 71st Division was broken up the battalion moved to 193rd Bde in 64th Division at Norwich on 19 February 1918. It went to Taverham in May 1918, returning to Norwich in the autumn, where it remained until the end of the war.

After the war it was converted into 52nd (Service) Battalion on 8 February 1919 and in March it was sent to join the occupation forces in Germany as part of 102nd Brigade in Eastern Division of British Army of the Rhine. The division was disbanded in October 1919 and the battalion returned to the UK to be finally disbanded at Ripon on 31 March 1920.

=== 2nd (Home Service) Garrison Battalion ===
The strain on the reserve battalions at Harwich of both providing reinforcement drafts and manning coast defences was addressed by the formation on 5 May 1916 of the 2nd (Home Service) Garrison Bn, Suffolk Regiment, from men of low medical category in the SR brigade of the Harwich garrison. It was commanded by Col Sir Kenneth Hagar Kemp, 12th Baronet, of the Norfolk Regiment. The companies were scattered among the defences of the estuary. Trained specialists were detached for service in other roles, and during 1917 the strength of the battalion was much reduced. There being little chance of invasion by then, it was made up to strength by men of medical category 'C' and transferred on 11 August 1917 to become 6th Bn Royal Defence Corps. It was disbanded at Felixstowe on 21 May 1918.

=== Postwar ===
The SR resumed its old title of Militia in 1921 but like most militia units the 3rd Suffolks remained in abeyance after World War I. By the outbreak of World War II in 1939, only one officer other than the Hon Colonel remained listed for the 3rd Bn. The Militia was formally disbanded in April 1953.

== Heritage & Ceremonial ==
=== Uniforms & Insignia ===
At the end of the Seven Years War in 1762 both battalions of the Suffolk Militia wore red uniforms with red facings, but by 1780 both regiments wore yellow facings. the West Suffolks continued with these until it became a battalion of the Suffolk Regiment in 1881, when it adopted the white facings assigned to that regiment. However, the Suffolks regained their traditional yellow facings in 1900, and the militia battalions conformed.

Around 1810 the officers' shoulder-belt plate of the 1st or West Suffolk Militia had an 'S' below the numeral 'I' within a crowned garter inscribed 'West Suffolk Militia'. Prior to 1855 the buttons also bore the numeral 'I' within a crowned circle inscribed 'West Suffolk'. The regiment used the Roman numeral 'X' (signifying its 10th place in the militia order of precedence) in its forage cap badge. In 1858 this was replaced by a scroll bearing the name of the regiment, but the sergeants of the permanent staff retained the 'X'.

From 1853 to 1881, the West Suffolks used the twin-towered castle badge of Suffolk within a crowned wreath, with a scroll beneath bearing the words 'West Suffolk Militia'. This was first worn as an ornament on the skirts of officers' coats, and from 1874 was adopted as the cap badge. The 12th Foot began using the triple-towered 'castle with key' (signifying the Battle Honour 'Gibraltar') in about 1861, and it was authorised as the regimental badge in 1872. The militia battalions will have adopted this form in 1881. When the militia adopted the Suffolks' uniform in 1881, a brass 'M" was worn on the shoulder strap, with the numeral '3' added above it in 1887. From 1889 the 3rd and 4th Militia Bns adopted the Suffolk Regiment's custom of wearing roses on their caps, colours and drums on Minden Day and the Sovereign's birthday.

New Regimental colours were issued to the West Suffolks when they reformed in 1853. These were replaced in 1884, when the field of the regimental colour changed to the white of the Suffolk Regiment, and both the Queen's and regimental colour bore the numeral 'III' for 3rd Bn in the canton. The new colours were presented on 26 May 1884 by the honorary colonel's wife, the Marchioness of Bristol, and the old colours were laid up in St Mary's Church, Bury St Edmunds. New colours were presented to the 3rd (SR) Bn by Princess Louise, Duchess of Argyll, on 23 May 1912, and the 1884 colours were laid up two days later in St Mary's Church on the Ickworth Estate, home of the battalion's late honorary colonel, the Marquess of Bristol. They were placed on the wall above the vault where he was buried (see photo). In line with SR practice, the 1912 colours carried all the Battle honours of the Suffolk Regiment.

=== Precedence ===
In the Seven Years War militia regiments camped together took precedence according to the order in which they had arrived. During the War of American Independence the counties were given an order of precedence determined by ballot each year. For the Suffolk Militia the positions were:

- 39th on 1 June 1778
- 36th on12 May 1779
- 42nd on 6 May 1780
- 31st on 28 April 1781
- 26th on 7 May 1782

The militia order of precedence balloted for in 1793 (Suffolk was 19th) remained in force throughout the French Revolutionary War. Another ballot for precedence took place at the start of the Napoleonic War, when Suffolk was 59th, still applying to all the regiments in the county.This order continued until 1833. In that year the King drew the lots for individual regiments and the resulting list remained in force with minor amendments until the end of the militia. The regiments raised before the peace of 1763 took the first 47 places: the West Suffolks were 10th. Formally, the regiment became the '10th, or West Suffolk Militia'. Although most regiments paid little notice to the additional number, the West Suffolks did include the numeral in their insignia.

=== Colonels ===
Colonels of the regiment included:

- Augustus FitzRoy, 3rd Duke of Grafton
- George FitzRoy, 4th Duke of Grafton (as Earl of Euston), appointed 2 June 1780
- Sir William Parker, 7th Baronet, promoted 1 February 1808
- Henry FitzRoy, 5th Duke of Grafton (as Earl of Euston), transferred from the colonelcy of the East Suffolk Militia on 24 May 1830
- William FitzRoy, 6th Duke of Grafton (as Earl of Euston), appointed 24 December 1845
- Frederick Hervey, 2nd Marquess of Bristol (as Earl Jermyn) appointed 26 March 1846

After 1852 militia colonelcies became honorary appointments and the command was exercised by a lieutenant-colonel commandant. Honorary colonels of the West Suffolk Militia included:

- Frederick Hervey, 2nd Marquess of Bristol, former CO, appointed 3 August 1855, died 30 October 1864
- Frederick Hervey, 3rd Marquess of Bristol, commissioned (as Lord Fredrick Hervey) as lieutenant 14 December 1854, appointed Hon Col 10 January 1865, died 7 August 1907
- Sir Edward Greene, 1st Baronet, MP for Bury St Edmunds, appointed 7 June 1908, died 27 February 1920
- Brig-Gen S.E. Massy Lloyd, CBE, former adjutant and CO, appointed 15 April 1920

Other personalities:

- Henry Bunbury, commissioned as lieutenant-colonel 26 August 1788
- Lord Alfred Hervey (younger brother of 2nd Marquess of Bristol), commissioned as lieutenant 4 July 1831, captain 9 April 1852
- Lord Augustus Hervey (younger brother of 3rd Marquess of Bristol), commissioned as lieutenant 15 June 1859
- Lord John Hervey (younger brother of 3rd Marquess of Bristol), commissioned as captain 11 February 1869, major 22 October 1881
- Windsor Parker, MP for West Suffolk, former captain in the Bengal Cavalry, appointed major 9 October 1852
- Fuller Maitland Wilson, captain then major in the regiment promoted lieutenant-colonel and CO 9 April 1870
- Gerald Cadogan, 6th Earl Cadogan, former lieutenant in the Life Guards appointed (as Hon G.O. Cadogan) captain 2 July 1897

== See also ==
- Militia (Great Britain)
- Militia (United Kingdom)
- Special Reserve
- Suffolk Militia
- East Suffolk Militia
- Suffolk Artillery Militia
