= Thornhill baronets =

Extinct baronetcy in the Baronetage of the United Kingdom

Arms of Thornhill of Ollantigh and Barbados

There have been two baronetcies created for persons with the surname Thornhill, one in the Baronetage of England and one in the Baronetage of the United Kingdom. Both creations are extinct.

The Thornhill Baronetcy, of Olantigh in the County of Kent and of Barbados, was created in the Baronetage of England on 24 December 1682 for Timothy Thornhill, the member of an old Kentish family. He was childless and the title became extinct on his death in circa 1693.

The Thornhill, later Compton-Thornhill Baronetcy, of Riddlesworth Hall in the Parish of Riddlesworth in the County of Norfolk and of Pakenham Lodge in the Parish of Pakenham in the County of Suffolk, was created in the Baronetage of the United Kingdom on 11 August 1885. For more information on this creation, see Compton-Thornhill baronets.

== Thornhill baronets, of Ollantigh and Barbados (1682) ==
- Sir Timothy Thornhill, 1st Baronet (died c. 1693)

== Thornhill, later Compton-Thornhill baronets, of Riddlesworth Hall and Pakenham Lodge (1885) ==
- see Compton-Thornhill baronets
