= June 1875 West Suffolk by-election =

UK parliamentary by-election

The June 1875 West Suffolk by-election was fought on 16 June 1875. The by-election was fought due to the death of the incumbent Conservative MP, Lord Augustus Hervey. It was won by the Conservative candidate Fuller Maitland Wilson.

June 1875 West Suffolk by-election
Party	Candidate	Votes	%	±%
Conservative	Fuller Maitland Wilson	2,780	72.4	N/A
Liberal	Charles Easton	1,061	27.6	New
Majority		1,719	44.8	N/A
Turnout		3,841	66.1	N/A
Registered electors		5,811		
Conservative hold				
