= William Parker (Oxford University cricketer) =

English cricketer

Personal information
- Born: 5 May 1832; Mhow, India
- Died: 17 July 1873 (aged 41); Wandsworth, London, England
- Source: ESPNcricinfo, 20 May 2016

William Windsor Parker (5 May 1832 – 17 July 1873) was an English cricketer. He played nine first-class matches for Oxford University Cricket Club between 1852 and 1860.

He was the son of Windsor Parker and was educated at Rugby School and Merton College, Oxford, where he matriculated in 1850, and graduated B.A. in 1855. He studied law and was called to the bar at Lincoln's Inn in 1861.

== See also ==
- List of Oxford University Cricket Club players
