= 1864 West Suffolk by-election =

UK parliamentary by-election

The 1864 West Suffolk by-election was held in the United Kingdom on 8 December 1864 when the incumbent Conservative MP, Frederick Hervey became the Marquess of Bristol and so had to resign his seat in the House of Commons. His brother Lord Augustus Hervey, also a Conservative, was elected unopposed. He was returned again at the next three general elections, and held the seat until his death in 1875.
