= Philip Bennet (Suffolk MP) =

British Conservative Party politician

Philip Bennet (1795 – 17 August 1866) was a British Conservative Party politician.

He was elected to the House of Commons as one of the two Members of Parliament (MPs) for the Western division of Suffolk at a by-election in October 1845 following the death of the sitting MP Robert Rushbrooke. Bennet held the seat until the stood down at the 1859 general election.

Parliament of the United Kingdom
Preceded by Robert Rushbrooke; Harry Spencer Waddington	Member of Parliament for West Suffolk; 1845 – 1859; With: Harry Spencer Waddington	Succeeded by The Earl Jermyn; William Parker
