= 1838 West Suffolk by-election =

UK parliamentary by-election

The 1838 West Suffolk by-election was held on 7 May 1838 following the death of the incumbent Conservative MP, Robert Hart Logan. It was retained by the Conservative candidate, Harry Spencer Waddington, who was unopposed despite an attempt by local Radicals to find a candidate.
