= Geraldine Hervey, Marchioness of Bristol =

British collector and aristocrat

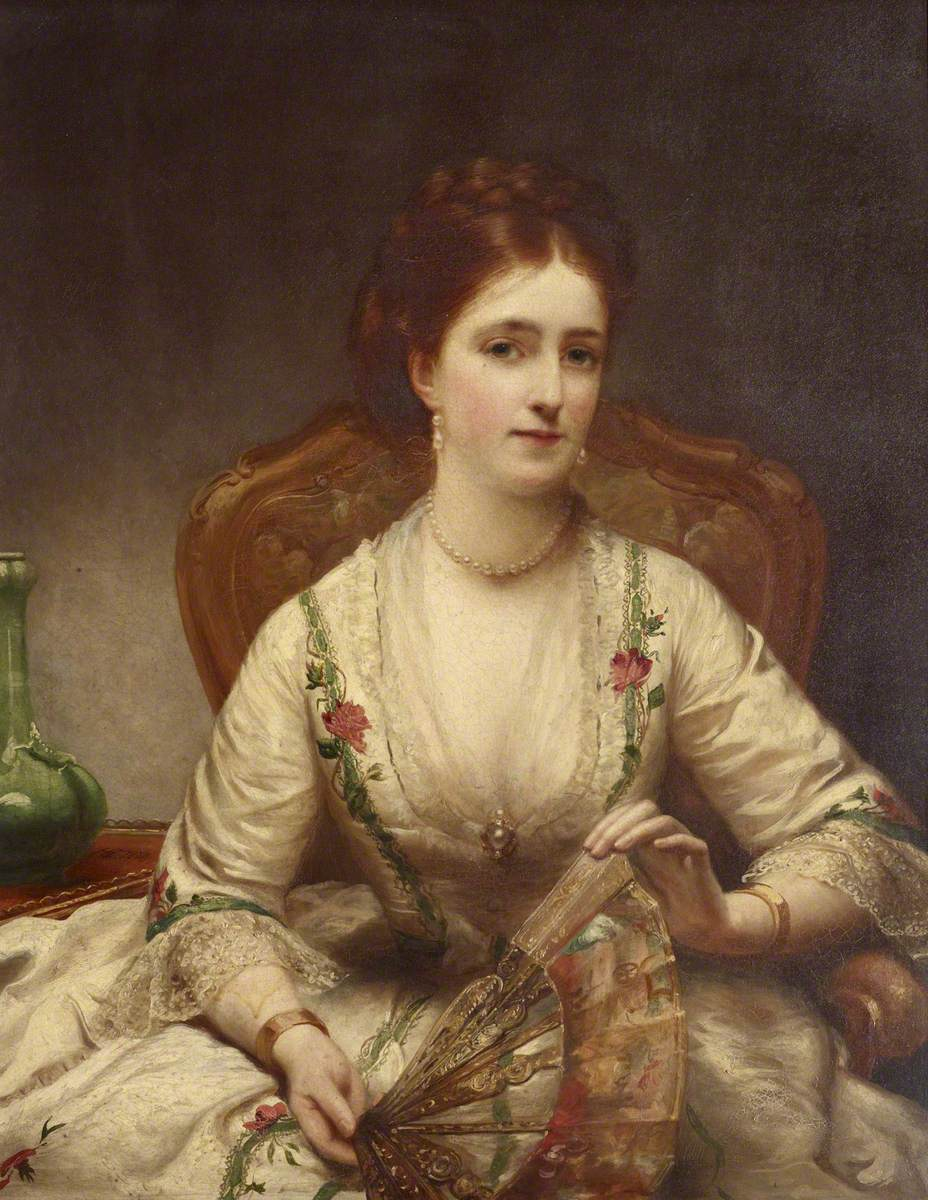
Painting by Henry Richard Graves (1818-1882) of Geraldine Georgiana Mary Anson (1834–1927), Marchioness of Bristol, National Trust collection. Found in the Wikidata item

Geraldine Georgiana Mary Hervey, Marchioness of Bristol DStJ (4 February 1843 – 25 January 1927) was a British collector and aristocrat.

== Life ==
Bristol was born in Melton Mowbray, Leicestershire, the daughter of Maj.-Gen. Hon. George Anson, who was later Commander-in-Chief, India, in 1856.

She used to collect elaborately decorated fans, which are now on display at Ickworth House. For this she was honoured with the freedom of the Worshipful Company of Fanmakers. Her collection of silver fish are also on display. She was a Dame of Grace of the Order of St. John of Jerusalem.

When the Marquess died in 1907, the Marchioness moved into a London house with her unmarried sister-in-law, Lady Mary Hervey.

== Family ==
On 4 March 1862, she married Frederick Hervey, Lord Jermyn (the son and heir of the 2nd Marquess of Bristol), in St. George's Church, Hanover Square, London, and they later had two daughters:

- Lady Katherine Adine Geraldine, Mrs. Drummond (d. 1 November 1948), married Allen Harvey Drummond
- Lady Alice Adeliza (d. 27 August 1962), married Hylton Jolliffe, 3rd Baron Hylton.

== Death ==
Lady Bristol died on 25 January 1927 in St George's Hospital on Hyde Park Corner after being knocked down by a motorist in Hyde Park, London, and was buried in the grounds of the family home, Ickworth House, two days later. She was crossing the street in front of two motorists driving parallel toward her; she stepped quickly to avoid being hit by one driver and was hit in the second lane by the other. The coroner ruled it was an accidental death but criticised the practise of drivers passing each other while driving through intersections.

She left an estate of £43,855 (equivalent to £3,306,000 in 2023).
