= Riddlesworth Hall =

Coordinates: 52.3943°N 0.8877°E

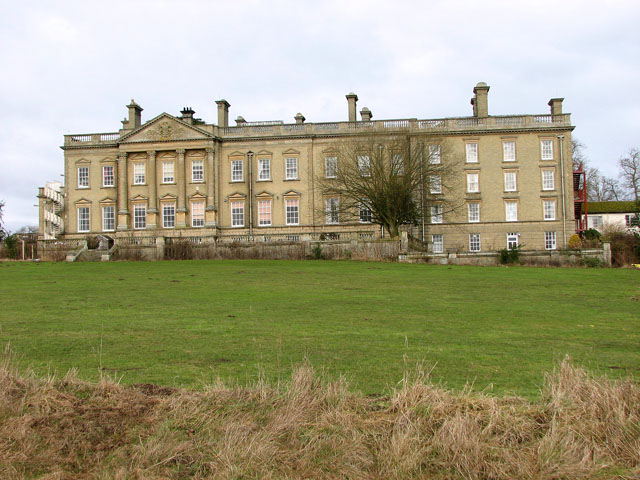
- Interactive map of the Riddlesworth Hall area
- Alternative names: Riddlesworth Hall School

General information
- Type: Manor
- Location: Riddlesworth, England
- Completed: 1792
- Client: Silvanus Bevan III

Design and construction
- Architect: Thomas Leverton

References
- www.riddlesworthhall.com

Riddlesworth Hall is a country house, and was formerly used as a boarding school. It is located in Riddlesworth, Norfolk, England.

== History ==
It was acquired by Silvanus Bevan III (1743–1830) in 1792.

It later became the seat of the Compton-Thornhill baronets, including Sir Thomas Thornhill, 1st Baronet (1837–1900) and Sir Anthony John Compton-Thornhill, 2nd Baronet (1868–1949). The second baronet had no heirs and the hall was converted for use as a school.

== Architecture ==
It was designed by architect Thomas Leverton (1743–1824) as a Georgian style three-storey manor house in 1792. It is surrounded by 12 hectares of parkland.

It was listed by English Heritage as a Grade II building on 21 July 1951.

== Riddlesworth Hall Preparatory School ==
Riddlesworth Hall Preparatory School

Location
- Hall Lane; Diss; Norfolk, IP22 2TA; England

Information
- Type: Preparatory school Day & Boarding
- Religious affiliation: Church of England
- Established: 1946
- Closed: 2023
- Department for Education URN: 121221 Tables
- Ofsted: Reports
- Gender: Coeducational
- Age: 2 to 13
- Houses: 4
- Website: http://www.riddlesworthhall.com/

In 1946, Riddlesworth Hall School was established as a predominantly girls' school but later catered to both boys and girls aged 2 to 13. In October 2015 it was announced that Riddlesworth had joined the Confucius International Education Group, which runs several international schools in China, Spain & USA. Riddlesworth was rebranded Confucius International School-Riddlesworth Hall (CISRH) as a result. The school then underwent a refurbishment and development programme.

Full and part-time boarding was available for children from age 7. Enrollment was intentionally kept small.

Pupils were allocated to four houses, which were named after prominent British women. Points were awarded for "achievement, effort, behavior and generosity of spirit".

House	Colour	Namesake
Aylward		Gladys Aylward, missionary
Cavell		Edith Cavell, nurse
Fry		Elizabeth Fry, reformer
Nightingale		Florence Nightingale, nurse

Notable former pupils include Diana, Princess of Wales

The school was formally closed in April 2023.
