= Harry Spencer Waddington =

British politician

Harry Spencer Waddington (c. 1780 – 26 February 1864) was a British Conservative Party politician.

He was elected to the House of Commons as one of the two Members of Parliament (MPs) for the Western division of Suffolk at a by-election in 1838 following the death of the sitting MP Robert Hart Logan. Waddington held the seat until he stood down at the 1859 general election. His initial election was unopposed, and no further elections in West Suffolk were contested until 1859.

Parliament of the United Kingdom
Preceded by Robert Hart Logan; Robert Rushbrooke	Member of Parliament for West Suffolk; 1838 – 1859; With: Robert Rushbrooke to 1845; Philip Bennet from 1845	Succeeded by The Earl Jermyn; William Parker
