= William Parker (MP for West Suffolk) =

British Conservative Party politician

William Windsor Parker

Member of Parliament for West Suffolk
- In office 1859–1885 Serving with: The Earl Jermyn (1859–1864); Lord Augustus Hervey (1864–1875); Fuller Maitland Wilson (1875); Thomas Thornhill (from 1875)
- Preceded by: Philip Bennet; Harry Spencer Waddington
- Succeeded by: William Biddell; Thomas Thornhill

Personal details
- Born: 1802
- Died: February 1892 (aged 89–90)
- Party: Conservative Party
- Occupation: Politician; cavalry officer; farmer

William Windsor Parker (1802 – February 1892) was a British Conservative Party politician. He was known as Windsor Parker.

== Life ==
He served for 18 years in the cavalry of the East India Company, 1820–38, and was present with the 10th Bengal Light Cavalry at the siege of Bhurtpore in 1826. Parker was aide-de-camp to the Commander in Chief and interpreter to Lord Combermere, 1825–27. He was commissioned as a Major in the West Suffolk Militia on 9 October 1852.

Parker lived at Clopton Hall, Rattlesden, Suffolk where he was a well-respected and enthusiastic farmer. He died in 1892 and is buried in the Church of St. Mary, with his wife and other members of his family.

Parker was elected to the House of Commons at the 1859 general election as one of the two Members of Parliament (MPs) for the Western division of Suffolk, and held the seat until he stood down at the 1880 general election.

== Family ==
Parker married in India, in 1830, Elizabeth Mary Duncan (died 1883), second daughter of General Alexander Duncan. They had five sons and four daughters. Their children included:

- William Windsor Parker, born 1831/2
- Duncan Parker, born 1834.
- Francis Parker, solicitor, died 1893, unmarried.
- Major (William Windsor) Howard Parker, died 1890, unmarried.
- Elizabeth Gertrude, married in 1873 the Rev. Henry Spelman Marriott.
- Mabel Ellen, married in 1876 James Pearse Napier, son of Robert Napier, 1st Baron Napier of Magdala.

Parliament of the United Kingdom
Preceded by Philip Bennet; Harry Spencer Waddington	Member of Parliament for West Suffolk; 1859 – 1885; With: The Earl Jermyn 1859–1864; Lord Augustus Hervey 1864–1875; Fuller Maitland Wilson 1875; Thomas Thornhill from 1875	Succeeded by William Biddell; Thomas Thornhill
