= Riddlesworth =

Civil parish in Norfolk, England

Coordinates: 52.40055°N 0.88951°E

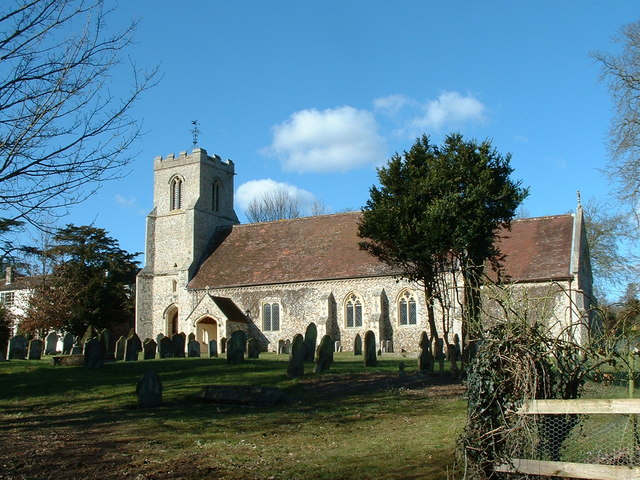
- St Peter's Church at Riddlesworth Hall School

- Location within Norfolk
- Area: 8.26 km^{2} (3.19 sq mi)
- Population: 147
  - Density: 18/km^{2} (47/sq mi)
- OS grid reference: TL966819
- Civil parish: Riddlesworth
- District: Breckland
- Shire county: Norfolk
- Region: East
- Country: England
- Sovereign state: United Kingdom
- Post town: DISS
- Postcode district: IP22
- Dialling code: 01953
- Police: Norfolk
- Fire: Norfolk
- Ambulance: East of England

Riddlesworth is a civil parish in the English county of Norfolk. It covers an area of 8.26 km^{2} (3.19 sq mi) and had a population of 147 in 48 households at the 2001 census. For the purposes of local government, it falls within the district of Breckland.

== St Peter's Church ==
Situated just beyond Riddlesworth Hall and school, St Peter's has an early 14th-century west tower and the plain octagonal font is 15th century. There is a fine monument to Sir Drue Drury (died 1617) of a kneeling knight with angels holding back curtains. The floor slabs at the end of the east end of the nave tell the sad tale of two ladies who were killed in their beds at the hall when a chimney stack fell on them in the 'furious hurricane' of 1703.

== Riddlesworth Hall ==
It is home to the Riddlesworth Hall, a listed Grade II former country house, built in 1792 and subsequently reconverted into a private preparatory school, where Diana, Princess of Wales was a pupil. Set in large grounds, the school was acquired by the Confucius International Education Group in 2015 and catered for children from the age of 7. The school closed in April 2023.

== Riddlesworth Polish camp and memorial ==
During the Second World War, part of Riddlesworth Park was given over to a British Army camp for British troops. In 1946 this camp was redesignated as one of the nearly 150 Polish resettlement camps. These camps were set up under the Polish Resettlement Act 1947 to receive the nearly 250,000 Polish troops and displaced Poles stationed all over Europe at the end of the war. Riddlesworth Camp was one of five set up in Norfolk to receive 4,500 troops and housed the 3rd Heavy Machine Gun Battalion of the 3rd Carpathian Infantry Division. This unit had fought through Italy at all the major battles against German forces and had distinguished itself at the Battle of Monte Cassino in May 1944. The majority of the Polish troops from this camp decided to stay in England after 1948 and were gradually found jobs in the locality and made new lives for themselves.

In 2016, a permanent memorial to the Division was unveiled by the Polish Ambassador to the United Kingdom, Witold Sobków. The memorial was designed and built by local people with the support of the Parish Council. The project was led by Philip Bujak whose father, having served with the Division in Italy, came to Riddlesworth in 1946. Remains of the camp buildings can still be seen amongst the trees.

== Gallery ==
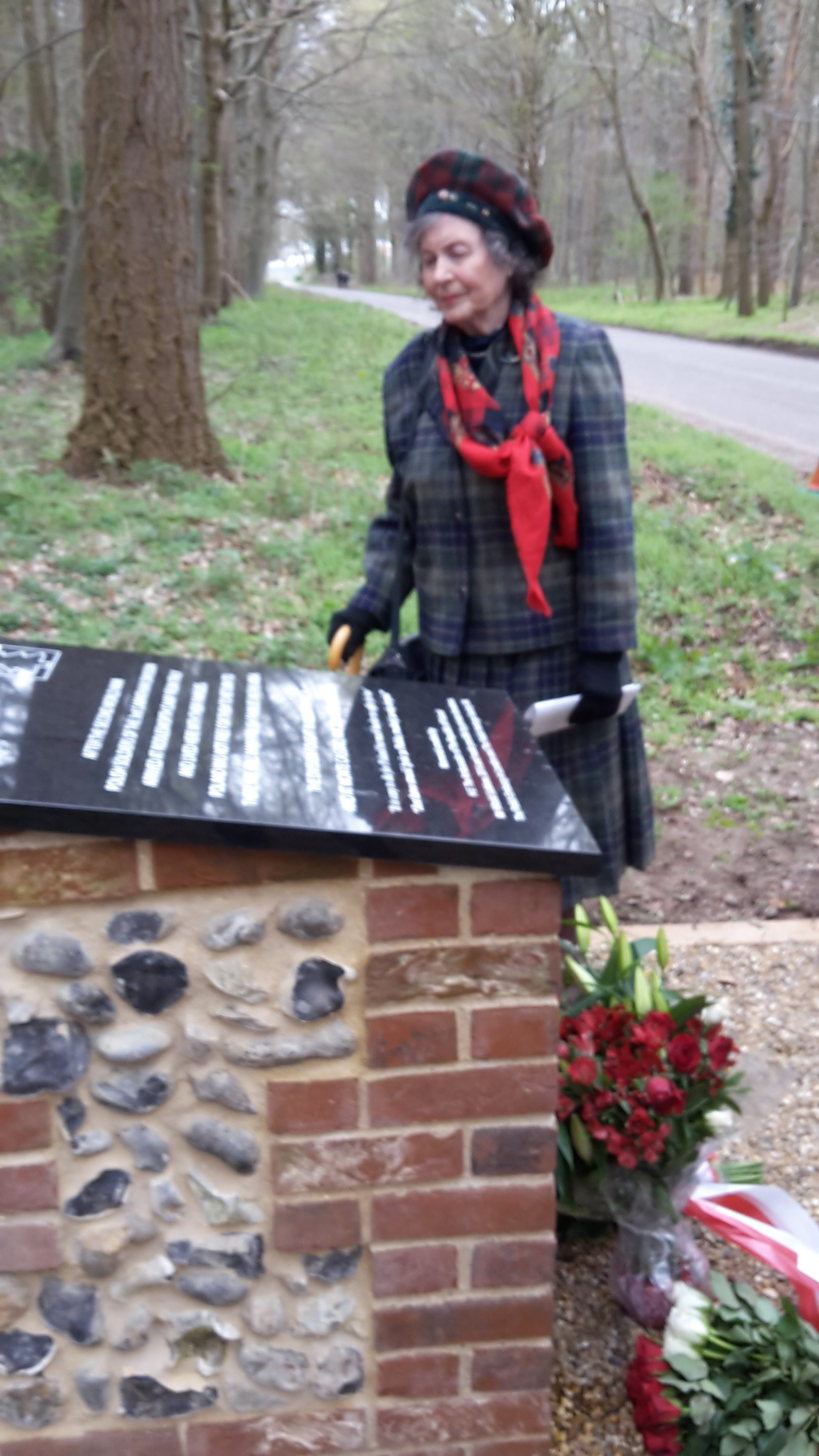
A visitor to the memorial

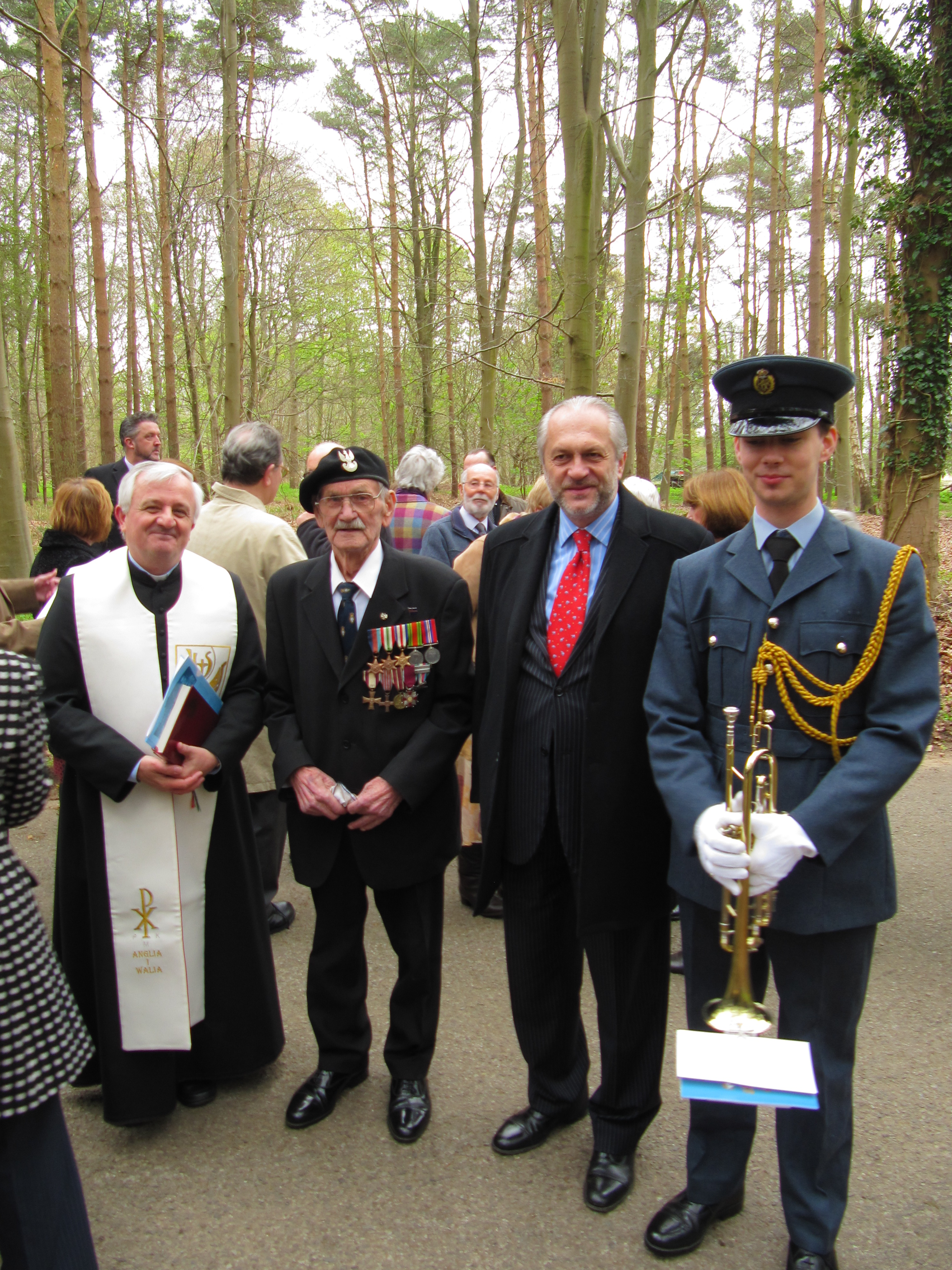
The Ambassador for The Republic of Poland Witold Sobkow at the unveiling in April 2016

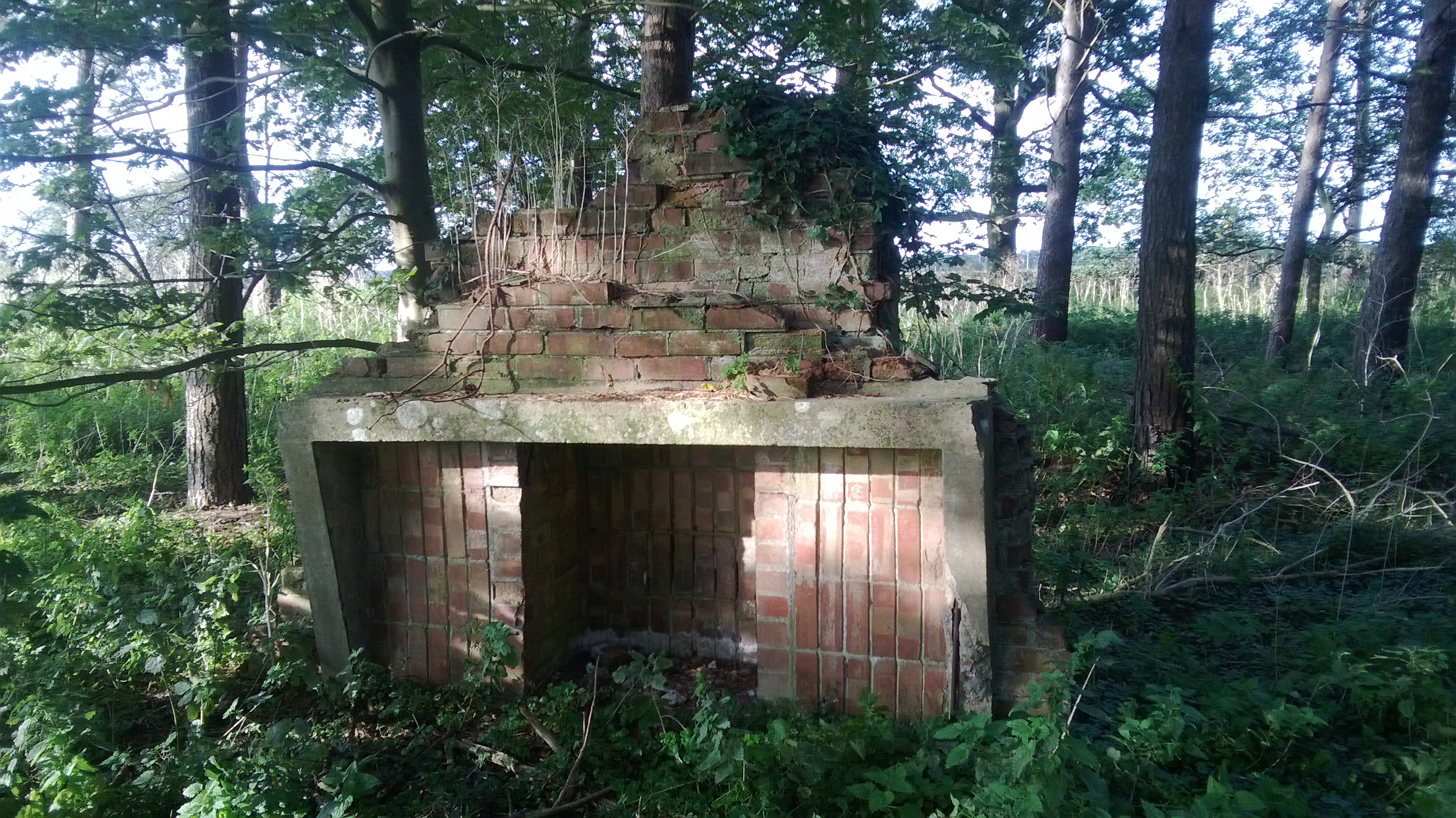
Remains of one of the many Nissen huts at Riddlesworth Camp

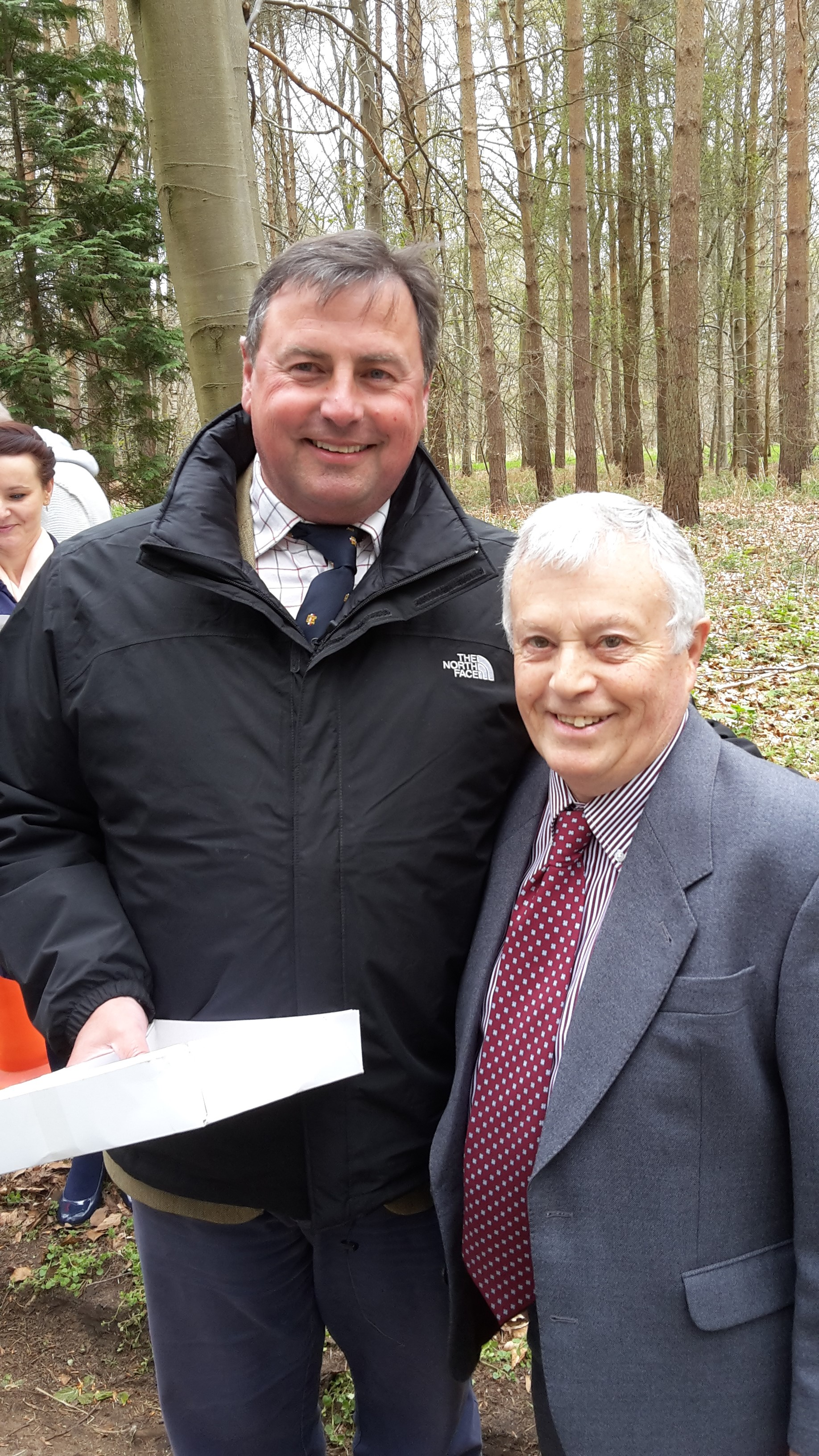
Robert Clegg, Chairman of Riddlesworth Parish Council. and Philip Bujak who led the Memorial project

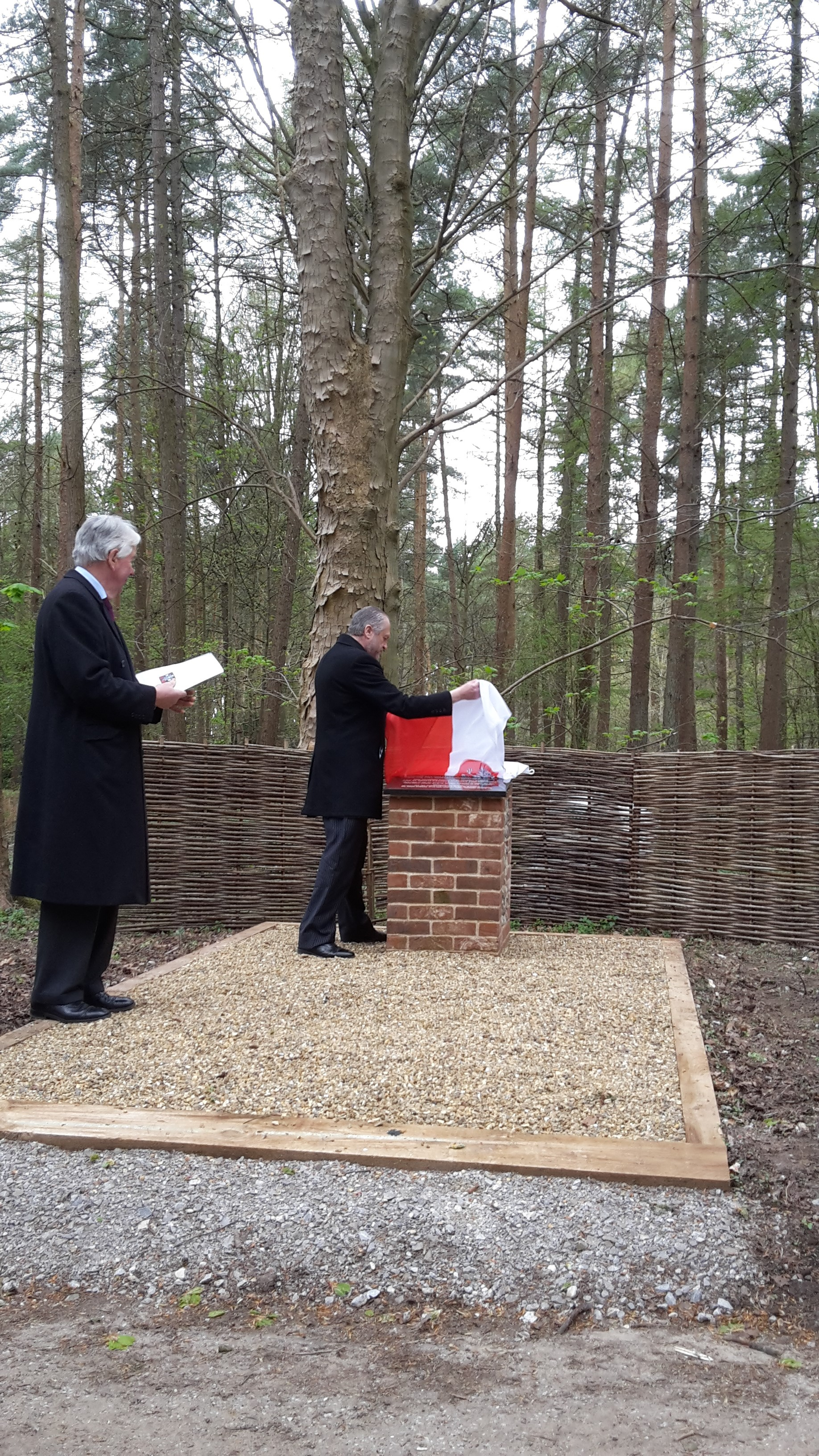
The memorial unveiled April 2016

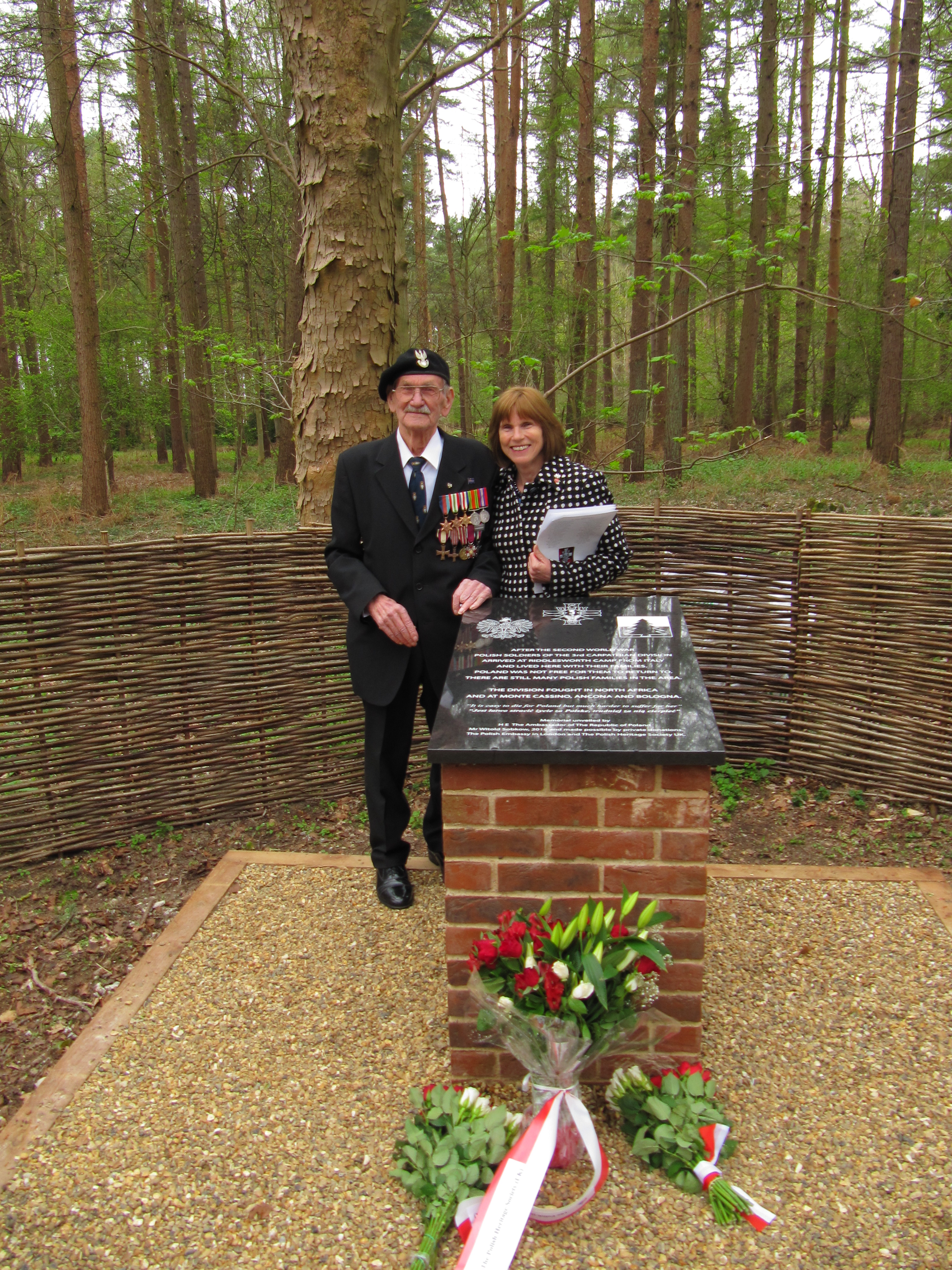
Alfred Zelke the last surviving Polish soldier from Riddlesworth camp

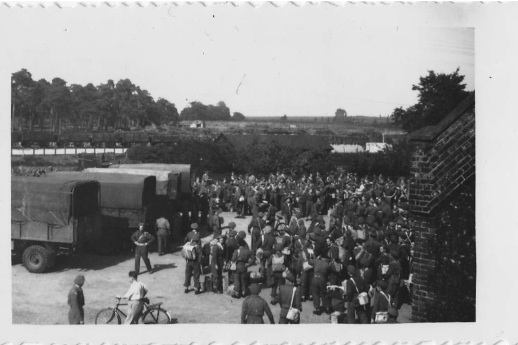
Polish troops from 3rd Carpathian Division arrive from Italy at Brandon station in 1947
