= 1845 West Suffolk by-election =

UK parliamentary by-election

The 1845 West Suffolk by-election was held on 7 July 1845 after the death of the incumbent Conservative MP, Robert Rushbrooke. It was retained by the unopposed Conservative candidate Philip Bennet, who was elected on a platform of support for agriculture and the Church of England.
