= Henry Wilson (Suffolk politician) =

British Liberal Party politician

Henry Wilson (27 August 1797 – 8 June 1866) was a British Liberal Party politician, and the only Liberal ever elected for the Western division of Suffolk.

At the 1835 general election he was elected to the House of Commons as one of West Suffolk's two Members of Parliament (MPs). However, he was defeated at the 1837 general election, and did not stand for Parliament again.

Parliament of the United Kingdom
Preceded by Sir Hyde Parker, Bt; Charles Tyrell	Member of Parliament for West Suffolk; 1835 – 1837; With: Robert Rushbrooke	Succeeded by Robert Hart Logan; Robert Rushbrooke
