= October 1875 West Suffolk by-election =

UK parliamentary by-election

The 1875 West Suffolk by-election was fought on 4 October 1875. The by-election was fought due to the death of the incumbent Conservative MP, Fuller Maitland Wilson. It was won by the unopposed Conservative candidate Thomas Thornhill.
