= William Biddell =

British politician (1825–1900)

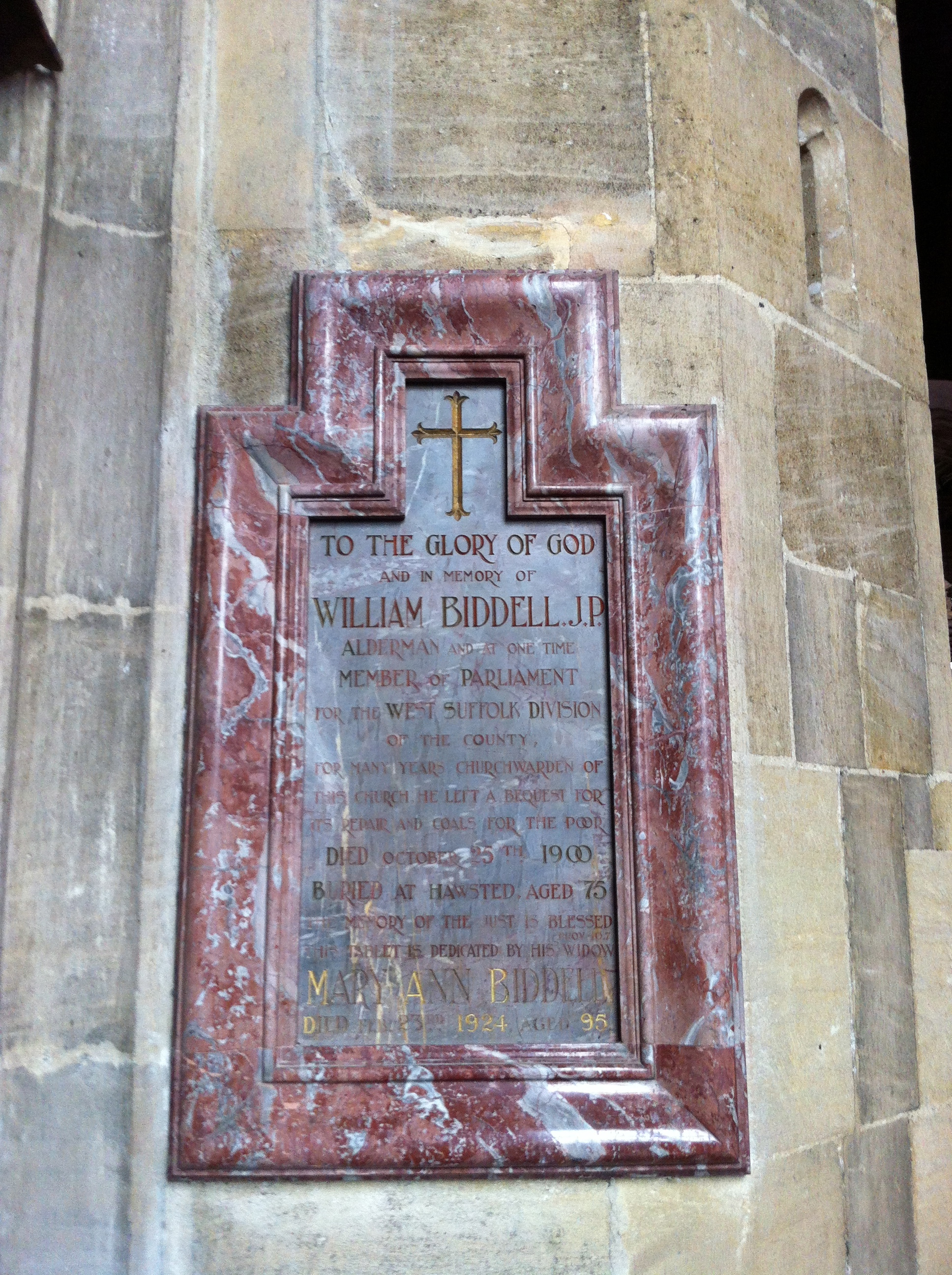
Memorial to William Biddell JP, MP, in St Peter and St Paul's Church, Lavenham, Suffolk

William Biddell (8 August 1825 – 25 October 1900) was a British Conservative Party politician.

He was elected to the House of Commons at the 1880 general election as one of the two Members of Parliament (MPs) for the Western division of Suffolk, and held the seat until the constituency was abolished at the 1885 general election.

Parliament of the United Kingdom
Preceded by William Parker; Thomas Thornhill	Member of Parliament for West Suffolk; 1880 – 1885; With: Thomas Thornhill	Constituency abolished
