= Charles Tyrell (politician) =

British politician (1776–1872)

Charles Tyrell, sometimes spelt Tyrrell (1776 – 2 January 1872), was a British Tory politician.

He was born the son of Charles Tyrell, vicar of Thurston, Suffolk and educated at Emmanuel College, Cambridge.

He married twice;

- firstly Elizabeth, the daughter and heiress of Richard Ray of Plashwood, with whom he had two sons and three daughters and
- secondly Mary Anne, the daughter of John Matthews of Wargrave, Berkshire and the widow of Thomas William Cooke of Polstead.

His first wife brought him the Plashwood estate near Haughley, Suffolk which he made his home.

He was appointed Sheriff of Suffolk in 1815 and elected to the House of Commons at the 1830 general election as one of the two Members of Parliament (MPs) for Suffolk. He was re-elected for the same constituency in the 1831. When that constituency was divided by the Reform Act for the 1832 general election, Tyrrell was returned for the new Western division of Suffolk. He did not stand again at the 1835 general election.

Tyrell was a founder member Suffolk Pitt Club and a member of the Ipswich Society of Professional & Amateur Artists from 1832.

He died at Plashwood in 1872 at the age of 96 and was buried at Haughley.

Parliament of the United Kingdom
| Preceded by William Rowley; Thomas Gooch | Member of Parliament for Suffolk; 1830 – 1832; With: Henry Bunbury | Constituency divided |
| New constituency | Member of Parliament for Western Division of Suffolk; 1832 – 1835; With: Hyde Parker | Succeeded by Henry Wilson; Robert Rushbrooke |
