= Fuller Maitland Wilson =

British politician

Fuller Maitland Wilson MP

Member of Parliament for West Suffolk
- In office 17 June 1875 – 4 September 1875 Serving with William Parker
- Preceded by: William Parker; Augustus Hervey
- Succeeded by: William Parker; Thomas Thornhill

Personal details
- Born: 27 August 1825
- Died: 4 September 1875 (aged 50)
- Party: Conservative
- Spouse: Agnes Caroline Kindersley (m. 1852)
- Parent(s): Henry Wilson; Mary Fuller Maitland

Fuller Maitland Wilson (27 August 1825 – 4 September 1875) was a British Conservative Party politician.

== Career ==
Heath was elected MP for the Western Division of Suffolk at a by-election in 1875, but died under three months later.

During his life, Wilson was also a Justice of the Peace for Suffolk and High Sheriff of Suffolk from 1873 to 1874. He served in the West Suffolk Militia, and was promoted to command the regiment with the rank of Lieutenant-Colonel in April 1870.

== Personal life ==
Wilson married Agnes Caroline Kindersley, daughter of Richard Torin Kindersley, in 1852. One of their children was British soldier Henry Fuller Maitland Wilson.

He is buried in the graveyard of Saint George's Church, Stowlangtoft, Suffolk.

Parliament of the United Kingdom
Preceded by William Parker; Augustus Hervey	Member of Parliament for West Suffolk; 1875–1875; With: William Parker	Succeeded by William Parker; Thomas Thornhill
