= Robert Rushbrooke =

British Conservative Party politician

Robert Rushbrooke (1779–1845) was a British Conservative Party politician.

He was elected to the House of Commons as one of the two Members of Parliament (MPs) for the Western division of Suffolk at the 1835 general election. Rushbrooke held the seat until his death in 1845, aged 65.

Parliament of the United Kingdom
Preceded by Sir Hyde Parker; Charles Tyrell	Member of Parliament for West Suffolk; 1835 – 1845; With: Henry Wilson 1835–1837; Robert Hart Logan 1837–1838; Harry Spencer Waddington from 1838	Succeeded by Harry Spencer Waddington; Philip Bennet
