= Sir Hyde Parker, 8th Baronet =

British Tory politician

Sir Hyde Parker, 8th Baronet (1785 – 21 March 1856) was a British Tory politician.

He was elected to the House of Commons at the 1832 general election as one of the two members of parliament (MPs) for the newly created Western division of Suffolk. He did not stand again at the 1835 general election. He was appointed High Sheriff of Suffolk in 1837.

Parliament of the United Kingdom
New constituency	Member of Parliament for Western division of Suffolk; 1832 – 1835; With: Charles Tyrell	Succeeded by Henry Wilson; Robert Rushbrooke
Honorary titles
Preceded by Edward Bliss	High Sheriff of Suffolk; 1837	Succeeded by Thomas Hallifax
Baronetage of England
Preceded by William Parker	Baronet (of Melford Hall); 1830–1856	Succeeded by William Parker
