= Thomas Thornhill =

British politician (1837–1900)

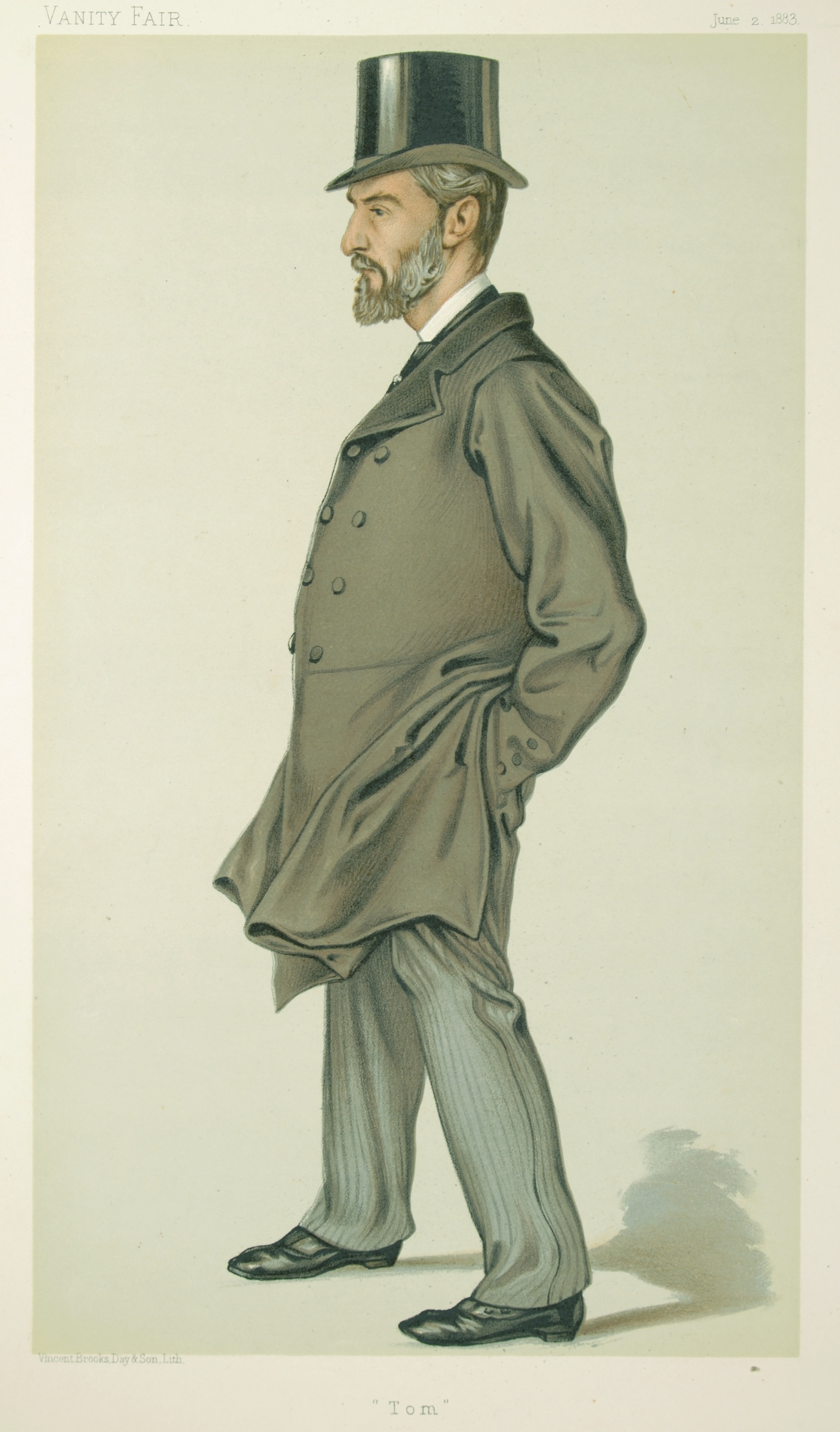
Caricature by VER published in Vanity Fair in 1883

Sir Thomas Thornhill, 1st Baronet (26 March 1837 – 2 April 1900) was a British Conservative Party politician.

== Career ==
Thornhill was the son of Thomas Thornhill, of Riddlesworth Hall.

He was appointed High Sheriff of Suffolk in 1860. He was elected to the House of Commons as one of the two members of parliament (MPs) for the Western division of Suffolk at a by-election in October 1875, and held the seat until the constituency was abolished at the 1885 general election. He unsuccessfully contested the Stowmarket division in 1885. From 1882 to 1885 he served as a junior Whip in Opposition.

He was made a baronet, of Riddlesworth Hall in the Parish of Riddlesworth in the County of Norfolk and of Pakenham Lodge in the Parish of Pakenham, Suffolk, on 11 August 1885.

Thornhill died at his residence, Pakenham lodge, Bury St Edmunds, on 2 April 1900.

== Family ==
Thornhill married in 1863 Katherine Edith Isabella Hodgson, daughter of Richard Hodgson-Huntley, of Carham Hall, Northumberland, by his wife Catherine Moneypenny Compton, daughter of Anthony Compton, of Carham Hall. Lady Thornhill was in January 1902 granted permission to take the surname and arms of Compton combined with Thornhill, for herself and her issue. He was succeeded by their son Anthony John Compton-Thornhill.

Parliament of the United Kingdom
Preceded by William Parker; Fuller Maitland Wilson	Member of Parliament for West Suffolk; 1875 – 1885; With: William Parker 1875–1880; William Biddell 1880–1885	Constituency abolished
Honorary titles
Preceded by John George Sheppard	High Sheriff of Suffolk; 1860	Succeeded by Edward Robert Starkie Bence
Baronetage of the United Kingdom
New creation	Baronet (of Riddlesworth Hall and Pakenham Lodge); 1885–1900	Succeeded by Anthony John Compton-Thornhill
