= Lord Augustus Hervey =

British politician

Lord Augustus Henry Charles Hervey (2 August 1837 – 28 May 1875) was a British Conservative Party politician.

== Background ==
Hervey was the second son of Frederick Hervey, 2nd Marquess of Bristol, and Lady Katherine Isabella, daughter of John Manners, 5th Duke of Rutland. Frederick Hervey, 3rd Marquess of Bristol and Lord Francis Hervey were his brothers. He was commissioned as a Lieutenant in the West Suffolk Militia (of which his father was Honorary Colonel, and in which his uncle and brothers also served) on 15 June 1859.

== Political career ==
Hervey was returned as a Member of Parliament (MP) for Suffolk West at a by-election in 1864, succeeding his elder brother Frederick, Earl Jermyn. He was returned again at the next three general elections and held the seat until his death in 1875.

== Family ==
Hervey married Mariana, daughter of William P. Hodnett and widow of Ashton Benyon, in 1861. They first met at Ickworth while she was visiting, introduced by the Duke of Rutland. She was still only eighteen years old, and recently bereaved by the death of her first husband, when they married.

They had five sons and two daughters. Two of their sons, Frederick and Herbert, both succeeded in the marquessate. Their daughter Maria married Sir Charles Welby, 5th Baronet. Their daughter, Lady Geraldine Hervey (died 1955), was granted the rank of a marquess' daughter on 15 November 1907, and was married to London banker Henry Hoare III of C. Hoare & Co., grandson of banker Henry Hoare I. She became the great-grandmother of Caroline Belinda Frisby (born 1963), mother of Olivia Grosvenor, Duchess of Westminster (born 1992).

Hervey died in May 1875, aged 37. Lady Augustus Hervey remained a widow until her death in January 1920.

Parliament of the United Kingdom
Preceded by Earl Jermyn; William Parker	Member of Parliament for Suffolk West; 1864–1875; With: William Parker	Succeeded by William Parker; Fuller Maitland Wilson
