= Frederick Hervey, 3rd Marquess of Bristol =

British politician (1834–1907)

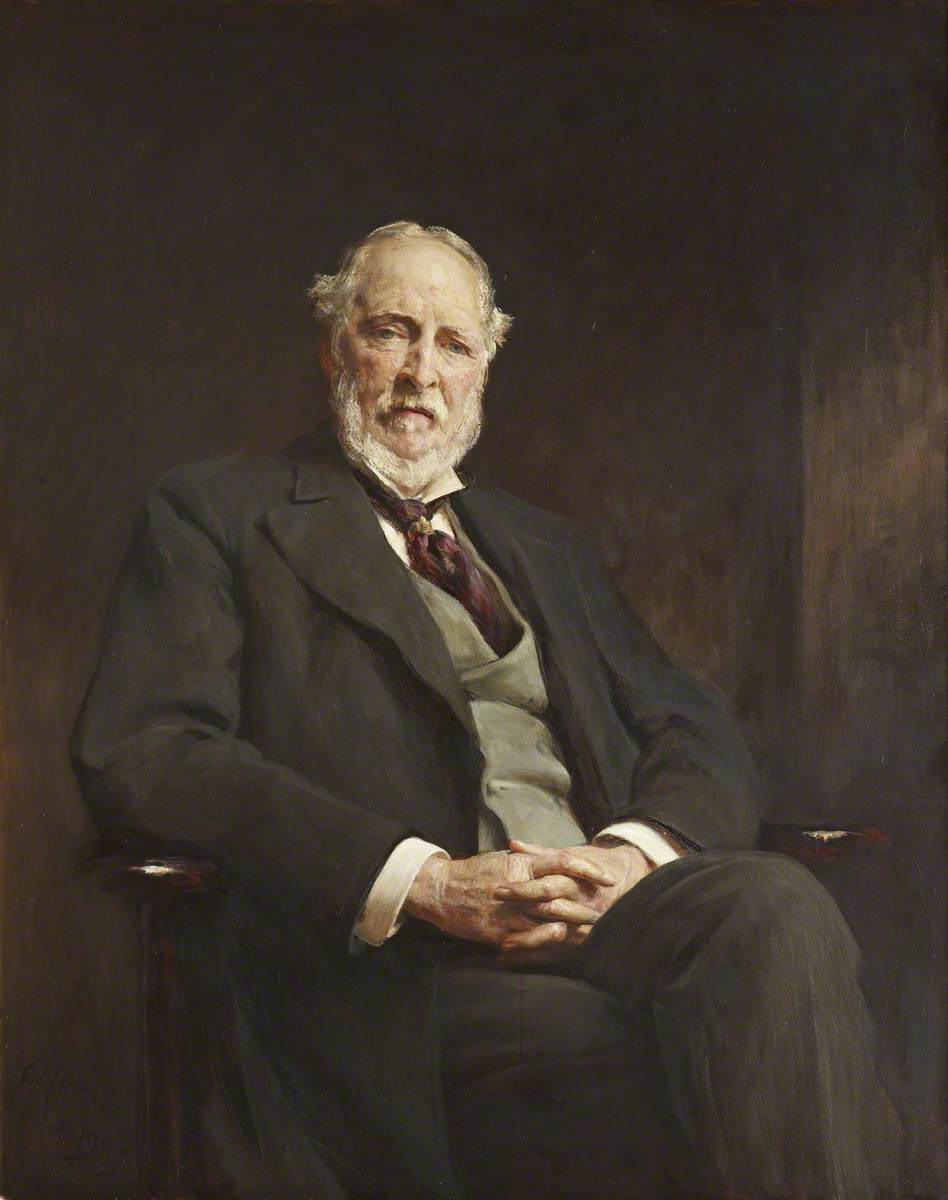
Portrait painted in 1905 by Arthur Stockdale Cope)

Frederick William John Hervey, 3rd Marquess of Bristol (28 June 1834 – 7 August 1907) was a British peer and member of parliament (MP).

Hervey was born in 1834 at Bristol House, Putney Heath, the son of Frederick Hervey, Lord Jermyn (later the 2nd Marquess of Bristol). He was educated at Eton and graduated from Trinity College, Cambridge in 1856. He was commissioned as a Lieutenant in the West Suffolk Militia (commanded by his father) on 14 December 1854. From 1859 until 1864, he was styled Lord Jermyn. On 4 March 1862, he married Geraldine Anson, a daughter of Maj.-Gen. Hon. George Anson, and they had two daughters.

Lord Bristol was a Conservative member of parliament (MP) for the Western division of Suffolk from 1859 until 1864, when he succeeded to his father's titles; his brother Lord Augustus Hervey won the resulting by-election unopposed. On 10 January 1865 he was appointed Honorary Colonel of the West Suffolk Militia in succession to his father. From 1886 to 1907 he was Lord Lieutenant of Suffolk. He created the famous Pompeian Room at Ickworth, whose designs are based on Roman wall paintings uncovered in 1777 at the Villa Negroni on the Esquiline Hill in Rome.

He owned 32,000 acres, mostly in Suffolk and Lincolnshire.

Lord Bristol died in 1907, and as he had no sons, he was succeeded by his nephew, Frederick Hervey.

Parliament of the United Kingdom
Preceded by Philip Bennet; Harry Waddington	Member of Parliament for West Suffolk; 1859–1864; With: William Parker	Succeeded by Lord Augustus Hervey; William Parker
Honorary titles
Preceded by The Earl of Stradbroke	Lord Lieutenant of Suffolk; 1886–1907	Succeeded by Sir William Brampton Gurdon
Peerage of the United Kingdom
Preceded by Frederick Hervey	Marquess of Bristol; 1864–1907	Succeeded by Frederick Hervey
