= Robert Hart Logan =

Canadian politician active in England

Robert Hart Logan (1772 – 13 April 1838) was a Canadian politician, active in England.

Born in Canada, to a Scottish family, Logan was educated in Montreal. He travelled as part of a delegation to the British government, to provide information on Canada, and to petition for the union of the Canadian provinces. He married an English woman, Nancy Service, and purchased Kentwell Hall in Suffolk. He commissioned Thomas Hopper to remodel the house's interior in the Gothic style.

Logan served as a magistrate and a deputy-lieutenant for Suffolk, and in 1828 he was High Sheriff of Suffolk. At the 1835 UK general election, he stood unsuccessfully for the Conservative Party in the Western Division of Suffolk. He stood again in the 1837 UK general election, on this occasion winning a seat. He served until his death, the following year.

Parliament of the United Kingdom
Preceded by Robert Rushbrooke; Henry Wilson	Member of Parliament for West Suffolk; 1837 – 1838; With: Robert Rushbrooke	Succeeded by Harry Spencer Waddington; Robert Rushbrooke
