= List of baronies in the Peerage of England =

Peerages and baronetcies of Britain and Ireland
| Extant | All |
|---|---|
| Dukes | Dukedoms |
| Marquesses | Marquessates |
| Earls | Earldoms |
| Viscounts | Viscountcies |
| Barons | Baronies |
En, Sc, GB, Ire, UK (law, life: 1958–1979, 1979–1997, 1997–2010, 2010–2024, 2024–present)
| Baronets | Baronetcies |

This page, one list of hereditary baronies, lists all baronies, extant, extinct, dormant, abeyant, or forfeit, in the Peerage of England.

== Baronies, 1264–1707 ==
| Title | Date of creation | Surname | Current status | Notes |
|---|---|---|---|---|
| Baron de Ros | 1264 (Note: According to The Complete Peerage:In 1616 the barony of De Ros was allowed precedence from this writ [of 24 December 1264], a decision adopted by the Lords in 1806 (Round, Peerage and Pedigree, vol. i, pp. 249-50); but these writs, issued by Simon in the King's name, are no longer regarded as valid for the creation of peerages – see Cokayne (1949) The corresponding article in the first edition of the Complete Peerage is at Cokayne (1895).) | De Ros, Manners, Cecil, MacDonnell, Villiers, FitzGerald-De Ros / Boyle, Dawson, Ross, Maxwell | extant | Created by writ. Forfeit 1464–1485. In abeyance 1508–1512. Also Earl of Rutland 1525–1587, 1618–1632. Also Duke of Buckingham 1649–1687. In abeyance 1687–1806, 1939–1943, 1956–1958 |
| Baron le Despencer | 1264 | le Despencer, Fane, Dashwood, Stapleton, Boscawen | Extant | Forfeit 1326–1398, 1400–1461; In abeyance 1449–1604; Earl of Westmorland 1626–1762; In abeyance 1762–1763, 1781–1788. Viscount Falmouth from 1891 |
| Baron Mowbray | 1283 | de Mowbray, Mowbray, Howard, Stourton | extant | Created by writ Abeyant 1481–1483, 1777–1878; Forfeit 1485–1554, 1572–1604; Also Baron Segrave 1368–present Also Baron Stourton 1878–present Subsidiary title of the Earl of Nottingham 1377–1397; Subsidiary title of the Duke of Norfolk 1397–1399, 1425–1476, 1483–1485, 1554–1572, 1660–1777; Subsidiary title of the Earl of Norfolk 1399–1425, 1476–1481; Subsidiary title of the Earl of Arundel 1604–1660 |
| Baron Braose | 1290 | de Braose | abeyant 1326 | |
| Baron Hastings | 1290 | Hastings, Astley | extant | Earl of Pembroke 1339–1389; Dormant 1389–1841; In abeyance 1542–1841 |
| Baron Wake of Liddell | 1295 | Wake | abeyant 1408 | Earl of Kent (1321 creation) 1349–1385; Earl of Kent (1360 creation) 1385–1408; Duke of Surrey 1397–1399 |
| Baron Vesci | 1295 | de Vescy | extinct 1297 | |
| Baron Neville de Raby | 1295 | Neville | forfeit 1571 | created Earl of Westmorland (1371) |
| Baron FitzAlan | 1295 | FitzAlan | abeyant 1306 | |
| Baron Umfraville | 1295 | Umfraville | dormant 1381, abeyant 1421 | Also Earl of Angus in Scotland |
| Baron Bruce of Anandale | 1295 | Bruce | forfeit 1306 or abeyant 1371 | Created for the Earl of Carrick |
| Baron Mauley | 1295 | Mauley | Abeyant 1415 | |
| Baron Furnivall | 1295 | de Furnivall, Nevill, Talbot, Howard, Dent, Bence | extant | Earl of Shrewsbury 1442–1616; In abeyance 1616–1651; Earl of Arundel 1654–1660; Duke of Norfolk 1660–1777; In abeyance 1777–1913, 1968–2025 |
| Baron Fauconberg | 1295 | Fauconberge, Nevill, Lane-Fox, Anderson-Pelham, Miller | Abeyant 2013 | In abeyance 1407–1429, 1470–1903, 1948–2012; Held together with Baron Conyers 1903–1948, 2012–2013 |
| Baron Greystoke | 1295 | Greystock | extinct 1306 | |
| Baron Hylton | 1295 | Hylton | abeyant 1746 | dormant from 1360 |
| Baron Huntercombe | 1295 | de Huntercombe | extinct 1313 | |
| Baron FitzWalter | 1295 | FitzWalter, Radcliffe, Mildmay, Plumptre | extant | Forfeit 1496–1506; Also Earl of Sussex 1529–1629; Dormant 1629–1667; Also Earl Fitzwalter 1730–1756; In abeyance 1756–1924, 1932–1953 |
| Baron Giffard | 1295 | Giffard | forfeit 1322 – restored 1327 – then in abeyance | |
| Baron Segrave | 1295 | de Segrave | extant | united with Baron Mowbray from 1375 |
| Baron Basset of Drayton | 1295 | Basset | abeyant or dormant 1390 | created by writ |
| Baron Berkeley | 1295 | de Berkeley | extinct 1418 | Created by writ |
| Baron Beke | 1295 | Beke | abeyant 1304 | Created by writ |
| Baron FitzWarin | 1295 | Fitzwarin | abeyant 1636 | |
| Baron Astley | 1295 | de Astley | forfeit 1554 | |
| Baron Dynham (or Dynaunt) | 1295 | de Dinham | abeyant 1501 | In 1914 the Committee for Privileges of the House of Lords resolved "That no evidence has been produced of the existence or descent of the alleged Barony of Dynaunt." |
| Baron Boteler of Werington | 1295 | | extinct c. 1328 | |
| Baron Grey de Wilton | 1295 | de Grey | forfeit 1603 | |
| Baron Montalt | 1295 | de Montalt | extinct bef. December 1296 | Created by writ. |
| Baron Mortimer of Wigmore | 1295 | de Mortimer | forfeit 1330 | Created by writ. In 1330, Roger de Mortimer, 1st Earl of March and 2nd Baron Mortimer of Wigmore, was attainted and his titles were forfeited. In 1331, his son Edmund de Mortimer was summoned to Parliament and the title was effectively re-created, as the attainder had not been reversed. |
| Baron Strange | 1295 | le Strange | extinct 1311 | |
| Baron Martin | 1295 | Martin | abeyant 1326 | |
| Baron Montfort | 1295 | de Montfort | extinct or abeyant bef. January 1370 | Created by writ. |
| Baron Daubeney | 1295 | Daubeny | extinct 1548 | Created Earl of Bridgewater in 1538 |
| Baron Foliot | 1295 | Foliot | abeyant 1325 | |
| Baron Hussey | 1295 | Hussey | abeyant 1470 | |
| 1296 | de Mortimer | abeyant | created by writ | |
| Baron Welles | 1299 | de Welles | forfeited 1470 or 1475 | |
| Baron De La Warr | 1299 | la Warr, West | Either abeyant 1554 or held together with the creation of 1572 | |
| Baron Zouche of Ashby | 1299 | la Zouche | abeyant 1314 | |
| Baron Deincourt | 1299 | Deincourt | abeyant 1327 | |
| Baron Montalt | 1299 | de Mohaut or de Montalt | Extinct 1329 | Also known as "Mohaut." Created by writ. See also Baron Mohaut (1295). |
| Baron Grandison | 1299 | de Grandison | Abeyant 1375 | |
| Baron Clavering | 1299 | Clavering | dormant or abeyant 1332 | |
| Baron Lancaster | 1299 | | | |
| merged in the crown 1399 | 1st baron became Earl of Lancaster, 1327 | | | |
| Baron Mortimer of Chirk | 1299 | de Mortimer | Abeyant 1322 | Created by writ. |
| Baron Vavasour | 1299 | Vavasour | abeyant 1826 | |
| Baron Ap-Adam | 1299 | Ap-Adam | abeyant 1310 | |
| Baron Muncy | 1299 | de Muncy | Extinct 1308 | |
| Baron Scales | 1299 | de Scales | abeyant 1483 | |
| Baron Lovel de Tichmersh | 1299 | Lovel | forfeit 1485 | 9th baron created Viscount Lovel, 1483 |
| Baron Moels | 1299 | de Moels | Abeyant 1337 | Created by writ. |
| Baron Mortimer of Richard's Castle | 1299 | de Mortimer | Abeyant 1304 | Created by writ. |
| Baron Courtenay | 1299 | Courtenay | forfeit 1461/1471 | First Baron created Earl of Devon, 1335 |
| Baron Rivers | 1299 | Rivers | extinct c. 1340 | |
| Baron Mohun | 1299 | de Mohun, le Strange | Abeyant 1594? | Created by writ. In 1431, this title became united with Baron Strange. |
| Baron Multon of Egremont | 1299 | de Multon | Abeyant bef. November 1344 | Created by writ. |
| Baron Chaworth | 1299 | de Chaworth | abeyant 1507 | |
| Baron Latimer | 1299 | Latimer, Nevill, Willoughby | dormant 1430 | Baron Willoughby de Broke was de jure Baron Latimer 1492–1521. Since then in abeyance. Created by writ. |
| Baron Bardolf | 1299 | de Bardolf | forfeit 1406 | |
| Baron Geneville | 1299 | de Geneville | Either extinct 1425 or merged in crown 1461 | United with the Barony of Mortimer 1356 |
| Baron Stafford | 1299 | de Stafford, Stafford | Forfeit 1521 | Created Earl of Stafford in 1351. Created Duke of Buckingham in 1444. |
| Baron Clinton | 1299 | Clinton, Fortescue, Rolle, Walpole, Trefusis | extant | Earl of Lincoln 1572–1692 abeyant 1692–1721; Earl Clinton 1721–1751 abeyant 1751–1760 dormant 1791–1794 abeyant 1957–1965 |
| Baron Beauchamp de Somerset | 1299 | de Beauchamp | abeyant 1361 | 1st creation of a barony of that name |
| Baron Ferrers of Chartley | 1299 | Ferrers, Devereux, Shirley, Compton, Townshend | abeyant 1855 | Viscount Hereford 1550–1572; Earl of Essex 1572–1601, 1604–1646 forfeit 1601–1604 abeyant 1646–1677; Earl Ferrers 1711–1717 abeyant 1741–1749; Earl of Leicester 1784–1807; Marquess Townshend 1811–1855 |
| Baron Percy | 1299 | Percy | extinct 1517 | |
| Baron Valence | 1299 | de Valence | extinct 1323 | 1st Baron became Earl of Pembroke, 1307 |
| Baron de Clifford | 1299 | Clifford, Sackville, Tufton, Southwell, Russell | extant | Earl of Cumberland 1525–1605 dormant 1605–1649, 1676–1678; Earl of Thanet 1678–1721 abeyant 1721–1734, 1775–1776, 1832–1833 |
| Baron St John of Lageham | 1299 | St John | dormant 1353 | |
| Baron Grandison | 1299 | de Grandison | extinct 1328 | |
| Baron Cantilupe | 1299 | de Cantilupe | extinct c. 1375 | |
| Baron Darcy of Nocton | 1299 | Darcy | Abeyant c. 1350 | |
| Baron Strange of Knockin | 1299 | le Strange, Stanley, Philipps | extant | Abeyant 1594–1921. Held by the Viscount St Davids since 1974 |
| Baron Lisle | 1299 | de Lisle | extinct 1337 | |
| Baron Sudeley | 1299 | de Sudeley | abeyant 1473 | also abeyant 1367–1380 |
| Baron Montagu | 1299 | de Montagu | status? | Created by writ. The Complete Peerage lists several different (some in existence simultaneously) Baronies of Montagu (as well as Baron Montagu of Boughton and Baron Montagu of Kimbolton) and discusses them in Appendix E of volume IX (1936). |
| Baron Latimer of Braybrooke | 1299 | le Latimer | forfeit 1603 | Created for Sir Thomas le Latimer |
| Baron Hastings | 1299 | Hastings | extinct c. 1314 | |
| Baron Lancaster | 1299 | de Lancaster | extinct 1334 | |
| Baron St John of Basing | 1299 | St John | abeyant 1429 | Previously abeyant 1347–1361 |
| Baron Ferrers of Groby | 1299 | Ferrers, Grey | forfeit 1554 | |
| Baron Morley | 1299 | de Morley, Morley, Lovel, Parker Mordaunt | abeyant 1697 | Created by writ. |
| Baron Tuchet | 1299 | Tuchet | extinct | |
| Baron St Amand | 1299 | de St Amand | extinct 1310 | |
| Baron Botetourt | 1305 | de Botetourt, Burnell, Berkeley, Somerset | Abeyant 1984 | Held by the Duke of Beaufort 1803–1984. |
| Baron Multon of Gilsland | 1307 | de Multon | status? | |
| Baron Thweng | 1307 | Thweng | abeyant 1374 | |
| Baron Boteler of Wem | 1308 | Boteler, Ferrers, de Greystoke, Dacre | Abeyant 1411 | |
| Baron Zouche of Haryngworth | 1308 | la Zouche, Bisshop, Curzon, Frankland | extant | |
| Baron Cromwell | 1308 | de Cromwell | extinct 1335 | Created by writ |
| Baron Tibetot (or Tiptoft) | 1308 | Tiptoft | abeyant 1372 | |
| Baron Badlesmere | 1309 | de Badlesmere | abeyant 1338 | Created by writ |
| Baron Beaumont | 1309 | Beaumont, Stapleton, Fitzalan-Howard | extant | Abeyant 1460–1840, 1895–1896. Subsidiary title of Duke of Norfolk since 1975 |
| Baron Everingham | 1309 | de Everingham | abeyant 1388 | Created by writ |
| Baron Monthermer | 1309 | de Monthermer, de Montagu | status? | Created by writ. |
| Baron Strange of Blackmere | 1309 | Strange, Talbot | abeyant 1777 | |
| Baron Lisle (of Rougemont) | 1311 | de Lisle | extinct 1399 | |
| Baron Cobham | 1313 | de Cobham, Oldcastle, Brooke, Boothby, Disney, Alexander | Abeyant 1951 | Forfeit 1603–1916; Abeyant 1789–1916 |
| Baron Audley | 1313 | Audley, Tuchet, Ticknesse(-Touchet), (Touchet-)Jesson, Souter | Abeyant 1997 | Created by writ; abeyances before: 1391–1408 and 1872–1937; forfeiture: 1497–1512(restored) |
| Baron Willoughby de Eresby | 1313 | Willoughby, Bertie, Drummond-Willoughby, Heathcote-Drummond-Willoughby | extant | also Earl of Lindsey from 1626 to 1779; also Marquess of Lindsey from 1706 to 1779; also Duke of Ancaster and Kesteven from 1715 to 1779; also Baron Gwydyr from 1828 to 1870; also Baron Aveland from 1888 to 1983; also Earl of Ancaster from 1892 to 1983 |
| Baron Camoys | 1313 | de Camoys | extinct 1372 | |
| Baron Charlton (or Cherleton) | 1313 | Charleton | abeyant 1421 | |
| Baron Marmion of Witringham | 1313 | Marmion | abeyant about 1360 | |
| Baron Vesci | 1313 | de Vescy | extinct 1314 | |
| Baron Holand | 1314 | de Holland | forfeit 1487 | |
| Baron St Maur | 1314 | St Maur | abeyant 1625 | |
| Baron Brun | 1315 | le Brun | Abeyant 1354/1355 | |
| Baron Damory | 1317 | d'Amory | United in 1363 to the Barony of Bardolf, which was forfeit in 1406 | |
| Baron Strabolgi | 1318 | Strathbolgi, Burgh, Kenworthy | extant | Created for the Earl of Atholl, now independent. Dormant or abeyant until 1916; the Complete Peerage denies its existence before 1916. |
| Baron Lucy | 1320 | de Lucy, de Umfraville, Percy | Dormant 1398 | |
| Baron Dacre | 1321 | Dacre, Fiennes, Lennard, Barrett-Lennard, Roper, Brand, Trevor | extant | forfeiture 1541–1558; 15th Baron was Earl of Sussex,1674–1715; abeyant 1715–1741; Viscount Hampden 1884–1965; abeyant 1965–1970 |
| Baron FitzHugh | 1321 | FitzHugh | Abeyant 1512/3 | |
| Baron Greystoke | 1321 | de Greystock, Dacre | Abeyant 1569 | |
| Baron Grey of Ruthyn | 1324 | Butler-Bowdon, Grey, Longueville, Yelverton, Gould, Rawdon, Clifton | Abeyant 1963 | Created by writ also Earl of Kent 1465–1639 also Viscount Longueville 1690–1799 also Earl of Sussex 1717–1799 also Marquess of Hastings 1858–1868; Abeyant 1868–1885, 1934–1940 |
| Baron Harington of Aldingham | 1324 | Harrington, Bonville, Grey | forfeited 1554 | created by writ, merged with the Barony of Bonville and Marquessate of Dorset in 1458. |
| Baron Aton | 1324 | de Aton | Abeyant 1373 | |
| Baron Ingham | 1326 | de Ingham, Stapleton | Dormant 1344 | Abeyant already 1344–1349 and again since 1466. |
| Baron Wilington | 1329 | de Wilington | Extinct 1348 | |
| Baron Maltravers | 1330 | Maltravers, Arundel, Fitzalan, Howard, Fitzalan-Howard | extant | The Barony was united with the Earldom of Arundel by the Earl of Arundel's Dignity and Style Act 1627 (3 Cha. 1. c. 4 Pr.), and is held by the Duke of Norfolk |
| Baron Burghersh | 1330 | de Burghersh, le Despencer, de Beauchamp | abeyant 1448 | |
| Baron Coleville | 1331 | de Coleville | extinct 1369 | |
| Baron Darcy de Knayth | 1331 | Darcy, Godolphin, Osborne, Lane-Fox, Herbert, Ingrams | extant | Created by writ. Abeyances 1418–1641 and 1888–1903 |
| Baron Talbot | 1331 | Talbot | abeyant 1777 | abeyant 1616–1651 |
| Baron Deincourt | 1332 | Deincourt | Forfeit 1487 | |
| Baron Kerdeston | 1337 | de Kerdeston, de Burgersh | abeyant 1391 | |
| Baron Chandos | 1337 | de Chandos, Brugge | extinct 1353 or 1789 | |
| Baron Monthermer (1337) | 1337 | de Monthermer | Extinct bet. October 1339–February 1340 | |
| Baron Grey of Rotherfield | 1338 | Grey | dormant 1388 | |
| Baron le Despencer | 1338 | le Despencer | extinct 1349 | |
| Baron Braose | 1342 | de Braose | extinct 1399 | |
| Baron Ughtred | 1344 | Ughtred or Oughtred | dormant 1365 | 1st Baron's son not summoned to Parliament |
| Baron Dagworth | 1347 | de Dagworth | Apparently united to the Barony of Fitzwalter, 1402 | |
| Baron Manny | 1347 | Manny | extinct 1389 | |
| Baron Bourchier | 1348 | Bourchier, Parr, Devereux | Abeyant 1646 | |
| Baron Hussey | 1348 | Hussey | extinct 1361 | |
| Baron Lovel of Castle Cary | 1348 | Lovel | Either extinct 1351 or abeyant 1625 | |
| Baron Poynings | 1348 | de Poynings, Percy | forfeit 1571 | |
| Baron Bryan | 1350 | de Bryan | abeyant 1390 | |
| Baron Musgrave | 1350 | de Musgrave | status? | |
| Baron Scrope of Masham | 1350 | Scrope | abeyant 1517 | |
| Baron Beauchamp de Warwick | 1350 | Beauchamp | extinct 1360 | 2nd creation of a barony of that name |
| Baron Holand | 1353 | Holland | abeyant 1408 | 1st baron created Earl of Kent in 1360 |
| Baron Lisle | 1357 | de Lisle, de Berkeley, Beauchamp | Abeyant 1420 | |
| Baron Beauchamp of Bletso | 1363 | Beauchamp | dormant about 1421 | 3rd creation of a barony of that name |
| Baron Botreaux | 1368 | Botreaux | Abeyant 1960 | The Barony is in abeyance together with the Baronies of Stanley and Hastings |
| Baron Aldeburgh | 1371 | Aldeburgh | Abeyant 1391 | |
| Baron Scrope of Bolton | 1371 | le Scrope | Dormant | Dormant 1630. Abeyant 1731. Abeyance terminated by extinction of other lines, 1814.Thereafter dormant |
| Baron Stafford | 1371 | Stafford | Abeyant 1445 | |
| Baron Cromwell | 1375 | Cromwell, Stanhope, Bewicke-Copley | extant | Created by writ abeyant 1455–1490, 1497–1923 |
| Baron Clifton | 1376 | Clifton | extinct 1394 | |
| Baron Arundel | 1377 | Fitzalan | either extant (if identical to Baron Maltravers) or abeyant | "would probably be held to be the same Barony as that of Mautravers" |
| Baron Camoys | 1383 | de Camoys, Stonor | extant | Created by writ abeyant 1426–1839 |
| Baron Lumley | 1384 | Lumley | forfeit 1400 | |
| Baron le Despencer | 1387 | le Despencer | extinct 1424 | |
| Baron Beauchamp of Kidderminster | 1387 | de Beauchamp | forfeit 1400 | 4th creation of a barony of that name |
| Baron Bergavenny | 1392 | Beauchamp, Nevill | extant or abeyant | 3rd to 7th creations occurred when writs issued to heirs male of previous holders – see article. 2nd Baron of 7th creation created Earl of Abergavenny in 1784. 6th Baron of 7th creation created Marquess of Abergavenny in 1876. |
| Baron Grey of Codnor | 1397 | Grey, Cornwall-Legh | extant | Abeyant 1496–1989 |
| Baron West | 1402 | West, la Warr | Abeyant 1554 | |
| Baron Tuchet | 1403 | Tuchet | Abeyant 1997 | created by writ also Baron Audley from 1408 (ending abeyance) forfeit 1497–1512 and 1631–1678 abeyant 1872–1937 and since 1997 |
| Baron Stafford | 1411 | Stafford | extinct 1420 | |
| Baron Berkeley | 1421 | Berkeley, Milman, Foley, Gueterbock | extant | Created by writ second baron created Viscount Berkeley, Earl of Nottingham, and Marquess of Berkeley, those titles extinct 1492 also Earl of Berkeley 1679–1882 in abeyance 1964–1967 |
| Baron Hungerford | 1426 | Hungerford | forfeit 1461 | |
| Baron Tibetot (or Tiptoft) | 1426 | Tiptoft | abeyant 1485 | 2nd Baron created Earl of Worcester, 1449 |
| Baron Latimer of Snape | 1432 | Nevill, Coutts-Nevill, Money-Coutts-Nevill | extant | Created by writ in abeyance 1577–1913 |
| Baron Fanhope | 1433 | Cornwall | extinct 1443 | |
| Baron Bardolf | 1437 | Phelip | extinct 1441 | creation doubtful |
| Baron Dudley | 1440 | Sutton, Ward, Lea, Smith, Hamilton, Wallace | extant | Created by writ in abeyance 1757–1916 |
| Baron Sudeley | 1441 | Boteler | Extinct 1473 | Created for the 6th Baron of the 1299 creation |
| Baron Lisle | 1444 | Talbot, Grey | Extinct 1525/6 | Created Viscount Lisle in 1451. Abeyant 1470 – abeyance terminated 1475. Created Viscount Lisle in 1483. Abeyant 1519 – abeyance terminated by 1523. |
| Baron De Moleyns | 1445 | De Moleyns, .., Philipps | extant | 1st baron later succeeded as 3rd Baron Hungerford – those two baronies were thereafter united. Held by the Viscount St Davids since 1974 |
| Baron Beauchamp of Powick | 1447 | de Beauchamp | extinct 1502/1503 | 5th creation of a barony of that name |
| Baron Saye and Sele | 1447 (with precedence from 1603) | Fiennes, Twisleton | extant | |
| Baron Hoo and Hastings | 1448 | Hoo | extinct 1455 | |
| Baron Stourton | 1448 | Stourton | extant | Held by Baron Mowbray, Segrave and Stourton |
| Baron Bonville | 1449 | Bonville, Grey | forfeit 1554 | 4th baron was created Duke of Suffolk in 1551. |
| Baron Berners | 1455 | Bourchier, Knyvett, Bokenham, Wilson, Williams, Kirkham | extant | Created by writ in abeyance 1693–1711, 1743–1832, 1838, 1992–1995 |
| Baron Stanley | 1456 | Stanley | Abeyant 1960 | 2nd Baron created Earl of Derby, 1485. The Barony is in abeyance together with the Baronies of Bortreaux and Hastings. |
| Baron Dacre | 1459 | Dacre | Extinct 1461 | |
| Baron Hastings of Hastings | 1461 | Hastings | Abeyant 1960, together with the Baronies of Stanley and Bortreaux | 3rd Baron inherited the Barony of Botreaux 1520 and created Earl of Huntingdon, 1529 (that title passed to another branch in 1789); 14th Baron created Marquess of Hastings in 1826 (extinct 1868); the Barony of Stanley was called out of abeyance together with this barony for the 20th Baroness in 1921 |
| Baron Herbert | 1461 | Herbert, Somerset, Seyfried | extant | also Earl of Pembroke 1468–1479 also Earl of Worcester 1526–1984 also Marquess of Worcester 1642–1984 also Duke of Beaufort 1682–1984; Abeyant 1984–2002 |
| Baron Lumley | 1461 | Lumley | forfeit 1545 | |
| Baron Ogle | 1461 | Ogle, Cavendish | abeyant 1691 | 9th baron had been created Viscount Mansfield, 1620 and Earl of Newcastle-upon-Tyne, 1628. He was created Marquess of Newcastle-upon-Tyne, 1643 and Duke of Newcastle-upon-Tyne, 1665 |
| Baron Wenlock | 1461 | Wenlock | Extinct 1471 | |
| Baron Mountjoy | 1465 | Blount | Extinct 1606 | |
| Baron Dynham | 1467 | Dynham | Extinct 1501 | |
| Baron Howard | 1470 | Howard | Either forfeit 1485 or abeyant 1777 | 1st baron created Duke of Norfolk, 1483 |
| Baron Dacre of Gillesland | 1482 | Dacre, (Hay, (?)), Howard | extant | Created Earl of Carlisle in 1661 |
| Baron Grey of Powis | 1482 | Grey | Abeyant 1552 | |
| Baron Hungerford | 1482 | Hungerford | extant | Created with precedence of 1426. Held by the Viscount St Davids since 1974 |
| Baron Welles | 1482 | Hastings | extinct 1503 | |
| Baron Daubeney | 1486 | Daubeny | extinct 1548 | Status uncertain, recreation of earlier Baron Daubeney? |
| Baron Cheyne | 1487 | Cheyne | extinct 1499 | |
| Baron Willoughby de Broke | 1491 | Willoughby, Greville, Verney | extant | abeyant 1521 – c. 1535 |
| Baron Conyers | 1509 | Conyers, Darcy, D'Arcy, Oxborne, Lane-Fox, Anderson-Pelham, Miller | Abeyant 2013 | In abeyance 1557–1641/4, 1888–1892, 1948–2012, 2013–present Held together with Baron Fauconberg 1903–1948, 2012–2013 |
| Baron Darcy de Darcy | 1509 | Darcy | Forfeit 1537 | |
| Baron Monteagle | 1514 | Stanley, Parker | Abeyant 1697 | |
| Baron Sandys of the Vine | 1523 | Vaux, Mostyn, Gilbey | Abeyant c.1683 | |
| Baron Vaux of Harrowden | 1523 | Vaux, Mostyn, Gilbey | extant | created by writ in abeyance 1663–1838, 1935–1938 |
| Baron Marney | 1523 | Marney | extinct 1525 | |
| Baron Braye | 1529 | Braye, Otway-Cave, Wyatt-Edgell, Verney-Cave, Aubrey-Fletcher | extant | Created by writ – abeyant 1557–1839 and 1862–1879 |
| Baron Hussey of Sleaford | 1529 | Hussey | forfeit 1537 | |
| Baron Windsor | 1529 | Windsor, Hickman, Windsor-Clive | extant | Abeyant 1642–1660 – held by the Earls of Plymouth (2nd creation) 1682–1833 – abeyant 1833–1855 – held by the Earl of Plymouth (3rd creation) since 1905 |
| Baron Wentworth | 1529 | Wentworth, Bulwer-Lytton | extant | Created by writ. Held by the Earl of Lytton since 1957 |
| Baron Burgh | 1529 | Burgh, Leith | extant | Created by writ. In abeyance 1602–1916 |
| Baron Tailboys of Kyme | 1529 | Tailboys | extinct 1563 | |
| Baron Mordaunt | 1532 | Mordaunt, Gordon | Abeyant 1836 | |
| Baron Hungerford of Heytesbury | 1536 | Hungerford | forfeit 1540 | |
| Baron Audley of Walden | 1538 | Audley | Extinct 1544 | |
| Baron St John of Basing | 1539 | Paulet | extant | Held by the Marquess of Winchester |
| Baron Russell of Cheneys | 1539 | Russell | extant | Held by the Duke of Bedford |
| Baron Parr of Horton | 1543 | Parr | extinct 1547 | |
| Baron Wriothesley | 1544 | Wriothesley | forfeit 1601 | 1st Baron Created Earl of Southampton in 1547 |
| Baron Eure | 1544 | Eure (or Evres) | extinct 1690 | |
| Baron Wharton | 1544 | Wharton, Kemys-Tynte, Vintcent, Robertson | extant | created by writ in abeyance 1731–1739, 1761–1916 |
| Baron Poynings | 1545 | Poynings | extinct 1545 | |
| Baron Seymour | 1547 | Seymour | extant | Subsidiary title of the Earl of Hertford (created 1537). 1st Baron created Duke of Somerset, 1547. |
| Baron Lumley | 1547 | Lumley | extinct 1609 | |
| Baron Seymour of Sudeley | 1547 | Seymour | forfeit 1549 | |
| Baron Sheffield of Butterwike | 1547 | Sheffield | extinct 1735 | Created Earl of Mulgrave in 1626 |
| Baron Stafford | 1547 | Stafford | extinct 1640 | |
| Baron Rich | 1547 | Rich | extinct 1759 | 3rd baron created Earl of Warwick in 1618 |
| Baron Willoughby of Parham | 1547 | Willoughby | ??? | |
| Baron Darcy | 1548 | Darcy | extinct 1635 | created in tail male for the son of the Baron Darcy of Darcy (1509) |
| Baron Herbert of Cardiff | 1551 | Herbert | extant | Subsidiary title of the Earl of Pembroke and Montgomery |
| Baron Darcy of Chiche | 1551 | Darcy | extinct 1640 | Created Earl Rivers in 1626 |
| Baron Paget | 1552 | Paget | extant | Created by writ – held by the Marquess of Anglesey |
| Baron Chandos | 1554 | Brydges | extinct 1789 | created Earl of Carnarvon in 1714. Created Duke of Chandos in 1719. |
| Baron North | 1554 | North | Abeyant 1942 | created by writ in abeyance 1802–1841 |
| Baron Howard of Effingham | 1554 | Howard | extant | Created Earl of Nottingham in 1596 (extinct 1681). Created Earl of Effingham (GB) in 1731 (extinct 1816). Created Earl of Effingham (UK) in 1837 |
| Baron Williams of Thame | 1554 | Williams | extinct 1559 | |
| Baron Percy | 1557 | Percy | extinct 1670 | |
| Baron Hastings of Loughborough | 1558 | Hastings | extinct 1572 | |
| Baron Hunsdon of Hunsdon | 1559 | Carey | extinct 1765 | also Earl of Dover from 1628 to 1677 |
| Baron St John of Bletso | 1559 | St John | extant | |
| Baron Beauchamp of Hache | 1559 | Seymour | extinct 1750 | 6th creation of a barony of that name |
| Baron Lisle | 1561 | Dudley | extinct 1590 | |
| Baron Buckhurst | 1567 | Sackville | extinct 1843 | 1st Baron created Earl of Dorset in 1604; Duke of Dorset in 1720. |
| Baron Burghley | 1571 | Cecil | extant | Created Earl of Exeter in 1605. Created Marquess of Exeter in 1801 |
| Baron Compton | 1571 | Compton, Townshend | abeyant | |
| Baron Cheyne | 1572 | Cheyne | extinct 1587 | |
| Baron De La Warr | 1572 | West | extant | Created Earl De La Warr in 1761 |
| Baron Norreys of Rycote | 1572 | Norreys, Bertie | extant | 5th baron created Earl of Abingdon in 1682. Also Earl of Lindsey |
| Baron Howard de Walden | 1597 | Howard, Scott-Ellis, Czernin | extant | created by writ in abeyance 1689–1784, 1797–1799, 1999–2004 |
| Baron Cecil of Essendon | 1603 | Cecil | extant | 1st baron created Earl of Salisbury in 1605. Created Marquess of Salisbury in 1789 |
| Baron Ellesmere | 1603 | Egerton | extinct 1829 | 1st Baron created Viscount Brackley in 1616; 2nd Viscount created Earl of Bridgewater in 1617. |
| Baron Gerard | 1603 | Gerard | extinct 1773 | |
| Baron Grey of Groby | 1603 | Grey | extinct 1976 | 2nd holder created Earl of Stamford in 1628. |
| Baron Harington of Exton | 1603 | Harington | extinct 1614 | |
| Baron Petre | 1603 | Petre | extant | |
| Baron Russell of Thornhaugh | 1603 | Russell | extant | Held by the Duke of Bedford |
| Baron Spencer of Wormleighton | 1603 | Spencer | extant | Created Earl of Sunderland in 1643. Became Duke of Marlborough in 1733 |
| Baron Wotton | 1603 | Wotton | extinct | |
| Baron Denny | 1604 | Denny | extinct 1660 | Created by writ. 1st Baron created Earl of Norwich in 1626. |
| Baron Marnhull | 1604 | Howard | extinct 1614 | Subsidiary title of the Earl of Northampton. |
| Baron Arundell of Wardour | 1605 | Arundel | extinct 1944 | |
| Baron Carew | 1605 | Carew | extinct 1629 | 1st Baron created Earl of Totnes in 1626. |
| Baron Cavendish of Hardwick | 1605 | Cavendish | extant | 1st baron created Earl of Devonshire in 1618. Created Duke of Devonshire in 1694 |
| Baron Herbert of Shurland | 1605 | Herbert | extant | Subsidiary title of the Earl of Montgomery. Now held by the Earl of Pembroke and Montgomery |
| Baron Stanhope of Harrington | 1605 | Stanhope | extinct 1675 | |
| Baron Knyvet | 1607 | Knyvet | extinct 1622 | |
| Baron Clifton | 1608 | Clifton, Stewart, Butler, O'Brien, Hyde, Bligh | extant | Created by writ. Held by the Earl of Darnley 1728–1900 and since 1937 |
| Baron Settrington | 1613 | Stuart | extinct 1672 | Subsidiary title of the Earl of Richmond (also Duke of Lennox in the Peerage of Scotland. 1st Earl created Duke of Richmond, 1623. |
| Baron Dormer | 1615 | Dormer | extant | |
| Baron Stanhope of Shelford | 1616 | Stanhope | extinct 1967 | 1st Baron created Earl of Chesterfield in 1628. |
| Baron Teynham | 1616 | Roper | extant | |
| Baron Noel of Ridlington | 1617 | Noel | extinct 1798 | 1st baron succeeded as Viscount Campden in 1629. |
| Baron Verulam | 1618 | Bacon | extinct 1626 | Created Viscount St Alban in 1621. |
| Baron Whaddon | 1619 | Villiers | extinct 1687 | subsidiary of Viscount Villiers, later created Earl, Marquess and Duke of Buckingham, and Earl of Coventry |
| Baron of Innerdale | 1619 | Hamilton | extinct 1651 | subsidiary of Earl of Cambridge |
| Baron Montagu of Kimbolton | 1620 | Montagu | extant | Subsidiary title of the Viscount Mandeville. Created Earl of Manchester in 1626. Created Duke of Manchester in 1719 |
| Baron of Newnham Paddockes | 1620 | Feilding | extant | Subsidiary title of the Viscount Feilding. Created Earl of Desmond in 1622. Created Earl of Denbigh in 1622 |
| Baron Brooke | 1621 | Greville | extant | Created Earl Brooke in 1746 and Earl of Warwick in 1759 |
| Baron Montagu of Boughton | 1621 | Montagu | extinct 1749 | 3rd baron created Earl of Montagu in 1689 and Duke of Montagu in 1705 |
| Baron Carey of Leppington | 1622 | Carey | extinct 1661 | 1st baron created Earl of Monmouth in 1626. |
| Baron Howard of Charlton | 1622 | Howard | extant | 1st baron created Earl of Berkshire, 1626. Belongs to the Viscountcy of Andover and is held by the Earl of Suffolk |
| Baron Burghersh | 1624 | Fane | extant | Subsidiary title of the Earl of Westmorland |
| Baron Conway | 1624 | Conway | extinct 1683 | Created Viscount Conway in 1627. Created Earl of Conway in 1679. |
| Baron Grey of Werke | 1624 | Grey | extinct 1706 | |
| Baron Robartes | 1625 | Robartes | extinct 1757 | 2nd baron created Earl of Radnor in 1679 |
| Baron Vere of Tilbury | 1625 | Vere | extinct 1635 | |
| Baron Craven | 1626 | Craven | extinct 1697 | |
| Baron Fauconberg | 1627 | Belasyse | extinct 1815 | 1st Baron created Viscount Fauconberg in 1643. |
| Baron FitzAlan | 1627 | Beaumont, FitzAlan-Howard | extant | The Barony was united with the Earldom of Arundel by Act of Parliament in 1627 and is held by the Duke of Norfolk. |
| Baron Lovelace of Hurley | 1627 | Lovelace | extinct 1736 | |
| Baron Mountjoy of Thurveston | 1627 | Blount | Extinct 1679 | Also Baron Mountjoy of Mountjoy Fort in the Peerage of Ireland. 1st baron created Earl of Newport, 1628 |
| Baron Pierrepont | 1627 | Pierrepont | Extinct 1773 | 1st baron created Earl of Kingston-upon-Hull in 1628. 5th earl created Duke of Kingston-upon-Hull in 1715 |
| Baron Poulett | 1627 | Poulett | extinct 1973 | 4th baron created Earl Poulett in 1706 |
| Baron Boteler of Brantfield | 1628 | Boteler | extinct 1657 | |
| Baron Brudenell | 1628 | Brudenell | extant | 1st Baron created Earl of Cardigan in 1661. Also Marquess of Ailesbury (created 1821) from 1868. |
| Baron Clifford | 1628 | Clifford, Boyle, Cavendish | Abeyant 1858 | Created in error |
| Baron Coventry | 1628 | Coventry | extinct 1719 | 5th Baron created Earl of Coventry in 1697 |
| Baron Hervey | 1628 | Hervey | extinct 1642 | also Baron Hervey of Ross. |
| Baron Howard of Escrick | 1628 | Howard | extinct 1715 | |
| Baron Maynard | 1628 | Maynard | extinct 1775 | |
| Baron Mohun of Okehampton | 1628 | Mohun | Extinct 1712 | |
| Baron Savile of Pontefract | 1628 | Savile | extinct 1671 | 2nd Baron created Earl of Sussex, 1644 |
| Baron Strange | 1628 | Stanley, Drummond of Megginch | extant | Created (in error) by writ. also Duke of Atholl 1805–1957 |
| Baron Hicks of Ilmington | 1628 | Hicks, Noel | extinct 1798 | Subsidiary title of Viscount Campden. |
| Baron Herbert of Chirbury | 1629 | Herbert | extinct 1691 | |
| Baron Cavendish of Bolsover | 1628 | Cavendish | extinct 1691 | Subsidiary title of Viscount Mansfield. Created Marquess of Newcastle in 1643. Created Duke of Newcastle in 1664. |
| Baron Wentworth of Wentworth-Woodhouse | 1628 | Wentworth | extinct 1695 | 1st Baron created Earl of Strafford in 1640 |
| Baron Bayning of Horkesley | 1628 | Bayning | extinct 1638 | subsidiary title of the Viscount Bayning of Sudbury |
| Baron Powis | 1629 | Herbert | extinct 1748 | 3rd baron created Earl of Powis in 1674 and Marquess of Powis in 1687. |
| Baron Cottington | 1631 | Cottington | extinct 1652 | |
| Baron Finch of Fordwich | 1640 | Finch | extinct 1660 | |
| Baron Stafford | 1640 | Howard, Jerningham, FitzHerbert | extant | forfeit 1680-1824 |
| Baron Raby | 1640 | Wentworth | Extinct 1799 | Subsidiary title of the Earl of Strafford |
| Baron Capell | 1641 | Capell | extant | 2nd Baron created Earl of Essex, 1661 |
| Baron Lyttleton of Mouslow | 1641 | Littleton | extinct 1645 | |
| Baron Newport | 1642 | Newport | extinct 1762 | 2nd baron created Viscount Newport, 1676 and Earl of Bradford, 1694 |
| Baron Byron | 1643 | Byron | extant | |
| Baron Craven of Ryton | 1643 | Craven | extinct 1650 | |
| Baron Hatton | 1643 | Hatton | extinct 1762 | 2nd baron created Viscount Hatton, 1683 |
| Baron Hopton | 1643 | Hopton | extinct 1652 | |
| Baron Jermyn | 1643 | Jermyn | extinct 1708 | |
| Baron Leigh | 1643 | Leigh | extinct 1786 | |
| Baron Loughborough | 1643 | Hastings | extinct 1667 | |
| Baron Percy of Alnwick | 1643 | Percy | extinct 1659 | |
| Baron Widdrington | 1643 | Widdrington | forfeited 1716 | |
| Baron Astley of Reading | 1644 | Astley | extinct 1688 | |
| Baron Clifford of Lanesborough | 1644 | Boyle | extinct 1753 | First baron created Earl of Burlington in 1664. |
| Baron Colepeper | 1644 | Colepeper | extinct 1725 | |
| Baron Ward | 1644 | Ward | extant | Created Earl of Dudley in 1860 |
| Baron Rockingham | 1645 | Watson | extinct 1782 | 3rd baron created Earl of Rockingham in 1714 (extinct 1746). 6th baron created Marquess of Rockingham in 1746 (extinct 1782). |
| Baron Cholmondeley | 1645 | Cholmondeley | extinct 1659 | Created for the Earl of Leinster. |
| Baron Cobham | 1645 | Brooke | extinct 1660 | |
| Baron Lexinton | 1645 | Sutton | extinct 1723 | |
| Baron Belasyse | 1645 | Belasyse | extinct 1691 | |
| Baron Gerard of Brandon | 1645 | Gerard | extinct 1702 | 1st holder created Earl of Macclesfield in 1679 |
| Baron Lucas of Shenfield | 1645 | Lucas | extinct 1705 | |
| Baron Wotton | 1650 | Kirkhoven | extinct 1683 | 1st Baron created Earl of Bellomont in 1680 |
| Baron Berkeley of Stratton | 1658 | Berkeley | extinct 1773 | |
| Baron Crofts | 1658 | Crofts | extinct 1677 | |
| Baron Langdale | 1658 | Langdale | extinct 1777 | |
| Baron Monck | 1660 | Monck | extinct 1688 | subsidiary title of the Duke of Albemarle |
| Baron Montagu of St Neots | 1660 | Montagu | extant | Subsidiary title of the Earl of Sandwich. |
| Baron FitzHerbert | 1660 | Finch | extinct 1729 | Created for the 3rd Earl of Winchilsea |
| Baron Hyde | 1660 | Hyde | extinct 1753 | First holder created Earl of Clarendon in 1661 |
| Baron Ashley | 1661 | Ashley-Cooper | extant | Created Earl of Shaftesbury in 1672. |
| Baron Cornwallis | 1661 | Cornwallis | extinct 1852 | 5th Baron created Earl Cornwallis in 1753. 2nd Earl created Marquess Cornwallis in 1792 (extinct 1823). |
| Baron Crew | 1661 | Crew | extinct 1721 | |
| Baron Delamer | 1661 | Booth | extinct | created Earl of Warrington in 1694 |
| Baron Granville | 1661 | Granville | extinct 1711 | subsidiary title of the Earl of Bath |
| Baron Holles | 1661 | Holles | extinct 1694 | |
| Baron Townshend | 1661 | Townshend | extant | 1st Baron created Viscount Townshend in 1682. 4th Viscount created Marquess of Townshend in 1787. |
| Baron Scott of Tynedale | 1663 | Montagu, Douglas, Scott | extant | Subsidiary title of the Earl of Doncaster. Held by the Duke of Buccleuch. |
| Baron Lucas of Crudwell | 1663 | Lucas | extant | Also Lord Dingwall. |
| Baron of Dauntsey | 1664 | Stuart | extinct 1667 | Subdidiary title of the Duke of Cambridge |
| Baron Arundell of Trerice | 1664 | Arundell | extinct 1768 | |
| Baron Bruce of Skelton | 1664 | Bruce | extinct 1747 | Subsidiary title of the Earl of Ailesbury. Also the Earl of Elgin. |
| Baron St Liz | 1664 | Feilding | extant | The Barony is held by the Earl of Denbigh, who is also the Earl of Desmond. |
| Baron Arlington | 1665 | Bennet-Fitzroy | extant | Created Earl of Arlington in 1672. All titles abeyant 1936–99, when the abeyance of the barony was terminated. |
| Baron Craven | 1665 | Craven | extant | Created for the Earl of Craven, but separated on the latter title's extinction in 1697. Created Earl of Craven in 1801. |
| Baron Frescheville | 1665 | Frescheville | extinct 1682 | |
| Baron Butler | 1666 | Butler, Cowper | abeyant | Created for the Earl of Ossory, heir to the Duke of Ormond. Under attainder 1715–1871, abeyant since 1905 |
| Baron of Dauntsey | 1667 | Stuart | extinct 1671 | Subdidiary title of the Duke of Cambridge |
| Baron Howard of Castle Rising | 1669 | Howard | extinct 1777 | 1st baron created Earl of Norwich in 1672. |
| Baron Nonsuch | 1670 | Castlemaine | extinct 1774 | Subsidiary title of the Duchess of Cleveland |
| Baron Clifford of Chudleigh | 1672 | Clifford | extant | |
| Baron Cooper | 1672 | Ashley-Cooper | extant | Subsidiary title of the Earl of Shaftesbury. |
| Baron Sudbury | 1672 | Fitzroy | extant | Subsidiary title of the Earl of Euston. Created Duke of Grafton in 1675. |
| Baron Grey of Rolleston | 1673 | North | extinct 1734 | 1st holder succeeded as 5th Baron North in 1677 |
| Baron Osborne | 1673 | Osborne | extinct 1964 | subsidiary title of the Viscount Latimer. Created Earl of Danby in 1674; Marquess of Carmarthen in 1689; and Duke of Leeds in 1694. |
| Baron Finch of Daventry | 1674 | Finch | extant | 1st Baron created Earl of Nottingham in 1681 – the holder of that earldom is now also Earl of Winchilsea. |
| Baron Settrington | 1675 | Gordon-Lennox | extant | The Barony belongs to the Dukedom of Richmond and is held by the Duke of Richmond and Lennox. |
| Baron Newbury | 1675 | FitzRoy | Extinct 1774 | Subsidiary title of the Duke of Southampton |
| Baron Heddington | 1676 | Beauclerk | extant | Subsidiary title of the Earl of Burford. Created Duke of St Albans in 1684. |
| Baron Manners of Haddon | 1679 | Manners | extant | Created for the Earl of Rutland. Created Duke of Rutland in 1703. |
| Baron Noel of Titchfield | 1681 | Noel | extinct 1798 | 1st baron succeeded as Viscount Campden in 1682. Created Earl of Gainsborough in 1682. |
| Baron Lumley | 1681 | Lumley | extant | Created Earl of Scarborough in 1690. |
| Baron Carteret | 1681 | Carteret | extinct 1776 | |
| Baron Alington of Wymondley | 1682 | Alington | extinct 1691 | also Baron Alington of Killard in the Peerage of Ireland. |
| Baron Thynne | 1682 | Thynne | extant | Subsidiary title of the Viscount Weymouth. Created Marquess of Bath in 1789. |
| Baron Dartmouth | 1682 | Legge | extant | 2nd baron created Earl of Dartmouth in 1711. |
| Baron Ossulston | 1682 | Bennet | extant | 2nd baron created Earl of Tankerville in 1714 |
| Baron Guilford | 1683 | North | extant | 3rd Baron created Earl of Guilford in 1752. |
| Baron Stawell | 1683 | Stawell | extinct 1755 | |
| Baron Churchill of Sundridge | 1685 | Churchill | extant | First baron created Earl of Marlborough in 1689 and Duke of Marlborough in 1702. |
| Baron Dover | 1685 | Jermyn | extinct 1708 | |
| Baron Jeffreys | 1685 | Jeffreys | extinct 1702 | |
| Baroness Darlington | 1686 | Sedley | extinct 1717 | Subsidiary title of the Countess of Dorchester – both peerages created for life |
| Baron Waldegrave | 1686 | Waldegrave | extant | Created Earl Waldegrave in 1729. |
| Baron Bosworth | 1687 | Fitzjames | forfeit 1695 | Subsidiary title of the Duke of Berwick |
| Baron Tyndale | 1688 | Radclyffe | forfeit 1716 | Subsidiary title of the Earl of Derwentwater |
| Baron Griffin | 1688 | Griffin | extinct 1742 | |
| Baron Cirencester | 1689 | Bentinck | extant | Subsidiary title of the Earl of Portland. Created Duke of Portland in 1716. |
| Baron Cholmondeley of Namptwich | 1689 | Cholmondeley | extant | First baron created Earl of Cholmondeley in 1706. Created Marquess of Cholmondeley in 1815. |
| Baron Wokingham | 1689 | Oldenburg | extinct 1708 | Subsidiary title of the Duke of Cumberland |
| Baron Ashburnham | 1689 | Ashburnham | extinct 1924 | Created Earl of Ashburnham in 1730. |
| Baron Torbay | 1689 | Herbert | extinct 1716 | Subsidiary title of the Earl of Torrington. |
| Baron Milton | 1689 | Sydney | extinct 1704 | Subsidiary title of the Viscount Sydney of Sheppey. Created Earl of Romney in 1694 |
| Baron Villiers | 1691 | Villiers | extant | Subsidiary title of the Viscount Villiers. created Earl of Jersey in 1697. |
| Baron Capell of Tewkesbury | 1692 | Capell | extinct 1696 | |
| Baron Leominster | 1692 | Fermor | extinct 1867 | 2nd Baron created Earl of Pomfret in 1721 |
| Baron Herbert of Chirbury | 1694 | Herbert | extinct 1738 | |
| Baron Howland of Streatham | 1695 | Russell | extant | Created for the first Duke of Bedford |
| Baron Haversham | 1696 | Thompson | extinct 1745 | |
| Baron Ashford | 1697 | van Keppel | extant | Subsidiary title of the Earl of Albemarle. |
| Baron Shingay | 1697 | Russell | extinct 1727 | Subsidiary title of the Earl of Orford. |
| Baron Somers | 1697 | Somers | extinct 1716 | |
| Baron Barnard | 1698 | Vane | extant | 3rd Baron created Earl of Darlington, 1754 – 3rd Earl created Duke of Cleveland, 1833 – both titles extinct 1891 |
| Baron Alford | 1698 | de Nassau d'Auverquerque | extinct 1754 | Subsidiary title of the Earl of Grantham. |
| Baron Halifax | 1700 | Montagu | extinct 1771 | 1st Baron created Earl of Halifax in 1714 (extinct 1715); 2nd Baron created Earl of Halifax in 1715 (extinct 1771) |
| Baron Guernsey | 1703 | Finch-Knightly | extant | 1st holder created Earl of Aylesford in 1714. |
| Baron Gower | 1703 | Leveson-Gower | extant | Created the Earl Gower in 1746. Created the Marquess of Stafford in 1786. Created the Duke of Sutherland in 1833. |
| Baron Conway of Ragley | 1703 | Seymour | extant | Created Earl of Hertford in 1750. Created Marquess of Hertford in 1793. |
| Baron Hervey of Ickworth | 1703 | Hervey | extant | 1st baron created Earl of Bristol in 1714. Created Marquess of Bristol in 1826. |
| Baron Granville of Potheridge | 1703 | Granville | extinct 1707 | |
| Baron Tewkesbury | 1706 | – | merged in the crown 1727 | Subsidiary title of the Duke of Cambridge. |
| Baron Cowper | 1706 | Cowper | extinct 1905 | First baron created Earl Cowper in 1718. |
| Baron Chesterford | 1706 | Howard | extinct 1722 | Subsidiary title of the Earl of Bindon. |

== See also ==
- List of Lordships of Parliament (for Scotland)
- List of baronies in the Peerage of Ireland
- List of baronies in the Peerage of Great Britain
- List of hereditary baronies in the Peerage of the United Kingdom
