= Lord Lancaster =

Lord Lancaster may refer to:

- Baron Lancaster, an extinct hereditary title created in 1299
- Duke of Lancaster, a hereditary title now used by the British sovereign
- Earl of Lancaster, a hereditary title created in 1267, succeeded by Duke of Lancaster
- Mark Lancaster, Baron Lancaster of Kimbolton (born 1970), British Army officer and Conservative politician

== See also ==
- Honour of Lancaster, an English feudal barony associated with the city of Lancaster
- Caroline Dinenage, Baroness Lancaster of Kimbolton (born 1971), British Conservative politician
