= Charles Cheyne, 1st Viscount Newhaven =

English politician

Arms of Cheyne, Viscount Newhaven: Chequy or and azure, a fesse gules, fretty argent

Charles Cheyne, 1st Viscount Newhaven (23 October 1625 – 30 June 1698) was an English politician who sat in the House of Commons at various times between 1660 and 1698.

== Origins ==
He was the son of Francis Cheyne of Chesham Bois in Buckinghamshire by his wife Anne Fleetwood, a daughter of Sir William Fleetwood of Great Missenden, Buckinghamshire.

== Career ==
He matriculated at Brasenose College, Oxford on 29 January 1640, aged 14, and was a law student at Lincoln's Inn in 1642, (as "Cheney"). In 1644 he inherited the estate of Cogenhoe in Northamptonshire and in 1657 purchased the manor of Chelsea, in Middlesex (now subsumed by Central London), and its main house, Chelsea Place, financed by the dowry of his wife Lady Jane Cavendish. He paid for the house in instalments beginning in 1657 with £1,900 and made the final payment for whole estate in 1661 at a total cost of £13,626.

In 1660 Cheyne was elected a member of parliament for Amersham, Buckinghamshire, in the Convention Parliament. He was elected a member of parliament for Great Marlow, Buckinghamshire, in March 1669 to the Cavalier Parliament and sat until 1679. He was created Viscount Newhaven (in Scotland) on 17 May 1681. In 1690 he was elected a member of parliament for Harwich in Essex and for Newport in Cornwall and chose to sit for Harwich until 1695. In 1695 he was elected for Newport and sat until his death.

== Marriages and children ==
He married twice:

- Firstly to Lady Jane Cavendish, a daughter of William Cavendish, 1st Duke of Newcastle, by whom he had issue a son and two daughters:
  - William Cheyne, 2nd Viscount Newhaven, son and heir;
  - Elizabeth Cheyne;
  - Catharine Cheyne;
- Secondly he married Isabella Smyth (Countess of Radnor), a daughter of Sir John Smyth of Bidborough in Kent and widow of John Robartes, 1st Earl of Radnor.

== Death and burial ==
Cheyne died at the age of 72 and was buried at Chelsea Old Church on 13 July 1698, where a monument on the north wall commemorated him and his wife Lady Jane Cavendish who was a considerable benefactress of the building.

Peerage of Scotland
New creation	Viscount Newhaven; 1681–1698	Succeeded by William Cheyne
