= Viscount Newhaven =

Title in the Peerage of Scotland

Arms of Cheyne, Viscount Newhaven: Chequy or and azure, a fesse gules, fretty argent

Viscount Newhaven was a title in the Peerage of Scotland. It was created 17 May 1681 for Charles Cheyne (or Cheyney), a Member of Parliament and Clerk of the Pipe. He was made Lord Cheyne at the same time, also in the Peerage of Scotland. He married Lady Jane Cavendish, a daughter of William Cavendish, 1st Duke of Newcastle by whom he was the father of William Cheyne, 2nd Viscount Newhaven. Charles purchased the estate of Chelsea, Middlesex (now in Central London), and was buried at Chelsea Old Church. After him are named Cheyne Row, Upper Cheyne Row and Cheyne Walk, in Chelsea. Upon the death of the 2nd Viscount on 26 May 1728 without issue, both titles became extinct.

== Viscount Newhaven (1681) ==
- Charles Cheyne, 1st Viscount Newhaven (c. 1624–1698)
- William Cheyne, 2nd Viscount Newhaven (1657–1728)

== See also ==
- Baron Newhaven
- Baron Cheyne
