= Jane Cavendish =

English poet and playwright

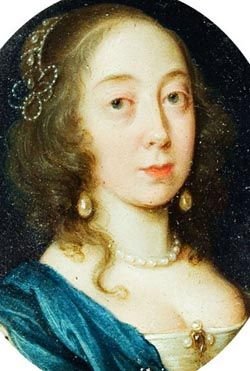
- Born: Jane Cavendish; 1621
- Died: 1669 (aged 47–48)
- Other name: Jane Cheyne
- Known for: Poetry

Lady Jane Cavendish (1621–1669) was a poet and playwright, the daughter of William Cavendish, Duke of Newcastle and later the wife of Charles Cheyne, Viscount Newhaven. Along with her literary achievements, Cavendish helped manage her father's properties while he spent the English Civil War in exile; she was responsible for a variety of military correspondences and for salvaging many of her family's valuable possessions. Later in life, she became an important community member in Chelsea, using her resources to make improvements on Chelsea Church and otherwise benefit her friends and neighbours. Marked by vitality, integrity, perseverance and creativity, Jane's life and works tell the story of a Royalist woman's indomitable spirit during the English Civil War and the English Restoration.

== Early life ==
Born in 1621 to William Cavendish and his first wife, Elizabeth Basset Howard, Jane Cavendish grew up in a prosperous and loving environment. Much of the wealth that William possessed had been accumulated by his grandmother, the Renaissance property magnate Elizabeth Hardwick, Countess of Shrewsbury—better known as Bess of Hardwick. Bess's properties, her fortune, and her remarkable tapestries were important inheritances of William's family, and Bess herself provided a template of autonomous female behaviour for William's daughters. Throughout his life, William added to Bess's wealth and properties—in part by marrying Howard, who was a rich widowed heiress at the time of their marriage.

Adjacent to his social and monetary ambitions were William Cavendish's tremendous literary ambitions, which he aspired toward in his own writings but homed in on most thoroughly by developing relationships with a wide range of poets and playwrights including Ben Jonson, Thomas Shadwell, and John Dryden. Because of her father's literary and political connections, Jane's world was—from the start—replete in the excesses that typified Charles I's court. She had a number of elegant gowns, many made of sumptuous velvets, and a fine collection of garments and linens. More significant than these signs of her social standing, however, are some early traces of her literary development. In one of her father's manuscript books (now University of Nottingham MSS Portland Collection, Pw V 25:21–22), Jane responded to her father's couplet "Sweet Jane / I know you are a rare Inditer.— / And hath the Pen off a moste redye writer. / W.N." with the following lines: "My Lord / I know you doo but Jest with mee / & so in obdence I right this nothing / Jane Cavendysshe." It is worth noting that although William wrote similar couplets to each of his children, only Jane and one of her brothers recorded a response—and Jane's is by far the cleverer of the two. Her father's assessment of her as “a moste redye writer” carried over into her adult life, when she collaborated with her sister on some literary documents and also wrote her own poetry.

== The English Civil Wars ==
As for other staunch Royalists, the English Civil War was a trying time for the Cavendish family. The closing of the theatres in 1642 would have been of especial significance for them, since William had written plays that were publicly performed before the war and his daughters were familiar with the networks of theatre culture that ranged from public theatrical performances to private readings of dramas.

Of course, the closing of the theatres was not the most traumatic event of the Civil War for the Cavendish family. Elizabeth Basset Howard died in 1643, leaving her children in possession of her money but without her guidance and compassion. Soon after his first wife's death, William was defeated in a critical battle at Marston Moor. He subsequently fled to France, leaving his daughters to maintain his property at Welbeck Abbey on their own. Welbeck Abbey was captured by Parliamentarian forces on 2 August 1644. Although Royalists briefly recaptured the home in 1645, they surrendered it in November. Amid these volatile circumstances, Jane and her sisters Elizabeth and Frances twice entertained Charles I at Welbeck in 1645. After Charles's execution in 1649, however, the sisters' world took on a grimmer tone. Their father was labelled a traitor, and they were forced to live under house arrest, where the conduct of the Parliamentarian troops was often rude at best. Jane continued to work toward preserving her family's possessions. She managed to barter with Royalist soldiers to have her father's valuable Van Dyck paintings and some tapestries moved to safety, and she and Frances sent out letters that provided information to the Royalist army about the status of Welbeck and its surroundings.

Moreover, during this period of unrest, Jane and her sister Elizabeth began compiling a variety of manuscript writings that they probably started working on as early as 1635—although most of the contents were written during the Civil War. These works, which were copied by their father's scribe John Rollston, are now held by the Beinecke and Bodleian libraries. Beinecke Osborn MS b. 233 is a presentation copy manuscript of poetry written exclusively by Jane. Bodleian Library, MS Rawl., Poet. 16 is a larger compilation, titled Poems Songs a Pastorall and a Play by the Right Honorable the Lady Jane Cavendish and Lady Elizabeth Brackley, comprising writings by Jane and Elizabeth. The sisters' individual contributions are noted in the margins by Rollston.

The sisters' collaborative writings were probably interrupted when Elizabeth moved to Ashridge to live with her husband, John Egerton. Frances and Jane would eventually follow Elizabeth to Ashridge for a brief interval because of the relative stability that it offered in contrast to their own besieged home. In 1654, Jane married Charles Cheyne (who would later become Viscount Newhaven). Jane and Charles had three children: Elizabeth (born 1656), William (born 1657), and Catherine (born 1658). Even as the Civil War continued, Jane and her husband found themselves able to enjoy a degree of comfort. Charles even managed to buy the former royal palace and manor of Chelsea with his wife's dowry.

== Later years ==
The Restoration brought some changes into Jane's world, a major one being the return of her father to England with his second wife—Margaret Lucas Cavendish who was younger than Jane. Margaret was an unwelcome addition to the family, and Jane wrote several letters discussing the control Margaret was exercising over William's property and income with other members of the family. Some scholars have read the character of "Lady Tranquility" in Jane and Elizabeth's play The Concealed Fansyes as a satire of Margaret Lucas, but others consider this unlikely. While the fictional father's choice of an unsuitable fiancée may reflect some anxiety on his daughters' parts, there are few if any similarities to the real Margaret Lucas. Furthermore, the manuscript book which contains The Concealed Fansyes, another play, and a variety of poems, was prepared as a presentation copy, a gift to William Cavendish from his daughters, intended for his pleasure and enjoyment. It seems likely that his daughters sought to emulate their playwright father, not offend him.

Jane Cavendish and her sister, Elizabeth Brackley, "are the only known collaborative female dramatists of the early modern period, and the co-composers of the first extant stage comedy by women in English." In 1664, Elizabeth died in childbed, which prompted Jane to write an elegy. It is difficult to know how much poetry Jane wrote during these later years. The elegy for Elizabeth is the only trace of it that has yet been discovered, but Nathan Comfort Starr and others have suggested that Jane continued to write poetry throughout her life.

Regardless of whether or not she wrote poetry after leaving Welbeck in the 1650s, Jane did manage to leave her mark on the world in a highly public way: she used her own money to have Chelsea Church re-roofed in 1667. After her death in 1669 from a series of epileptic fits, Jane's impact on Chelsea was chronicled in a funeral sermon by Adam Littleton and an elegy by Thomas Lawrence. Both of these texts make mention of how Jane used her financial resources to benefit her community; the texts also imply that Jane's role as a literary author was not unknown to her friends and neighbours. First at Welbeck and later in the house she shared with her husband and in the community of Chelsea more broadly, Jane engaged in culture on her own terms. Since 2018 her complete works have been available in a modern scholarly edition.

== Archives containing Jane Cavendish's works ==
A Celebration of Women Writers (Online editions)

- The Concealed Fansyes: A Play by Lady Jane Cavendish and Lady Elizabeth Brackley (Cheyne, Jane, Lady, 1621–1669 and Egerton, Elizabeth Cavendish, 1626–1663). Edited by Nathan Comfort Starr. PMLA, Vol. 46, No. 3 (Sep. 1931), pp. 802–838. Copyright not renewed.

Beinecke Rare Book and Manuscript Library, Yale University, New Haven, Connecticut.

- Osborn Shelves MS b.233. Presentation volume of the works of Jane Cavendish.

Bodleian Library, University of Oxford, Oxford.

- MS Rawl. Poet 16. Presentation volume of the works of Elizabeth Egerton and

Jane Cavendish.

Huntington Library, San Marino, CA

- MS EL 8048. Letter from Elizabeth Cavendish Egerton to Jane Cheyne.
- MS EL 8353. Poem, "On the death of my Dear Sister,” by Jane Cavendish Cheyne, 1663.
- MS EL 11143. Account book of Lady Jane Cheyne.

University of Nottingham, Nottingham.

- MS Portland PwV 19. Thomas Lawrence's elegy for Jane Cavendish Cheyne.

== Bibliography ==
- Alexandra G. Bennett, "'Now let my language speake': The Authorship, Rewriting, and Audience(s) of Jane Cavendish and Elizabeth Brackley". Early Modern Literary Studies 11.2 (September 2005): 3.1–13
- Elizabeth Brackley and Jane Cavendish, The Concealed Fancies (c. 1645), Renaissance Drama by Women: Texts and Documents, S. P. Cerasano and Marion Wynne-Davies, eds. New York and London: Routledge, 1996
- Margaret J. M. Ezell, "To Be Your Daughter in Your Pen: The Social Functions of Literature in the Writings of Lady Elizabeth Brackley and Lady Jane Cavendish". Huntington Library Quarterly 51.4 (1988) pp. 281–296
- Alison Findlay, "Playing the 'scene self' in Jane Cavendish and Elizabeth Brackley's The Concealed Fancies". Enacting Gender on the English Renaissance Stage. Ed. Anne Russell and Viviana Comensoli. Chicago: U of Chicago P, 1999, pp. 154–176
- Larson, Dr. Katherine. Early Modern Women in Conversation. Palgrave Macmillan. ISBN 9780230319615.
- Kamille Stone Stanton, "The Domestication of Royalist Themes in the Manuscript Writings of Jane Cavendish and Elizabeth Brackley", Clio: A Journal of Literature, History and the Philosophy of History 36:2 (Spring 2007)
- Marion Wynne-Davies, "Jane and Elizabeth Cavendish"; "Jane Cavendish"; "Elizabeth Cavendish", Women Poets of the Renaissance. London: J. M. Dent, 1998
