= Leslie Cubitt Bevis =

British Sculptor

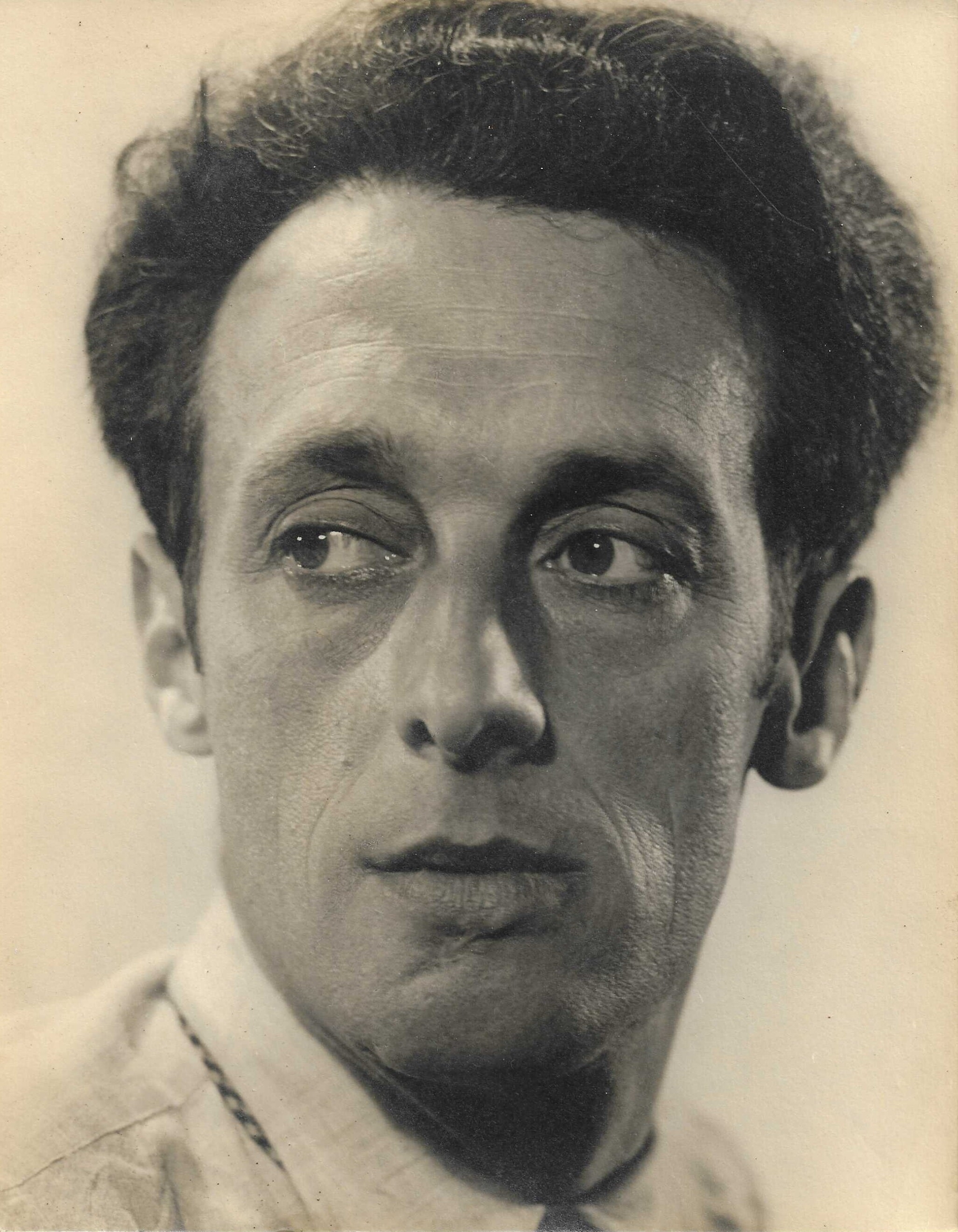
Leslie Cubitt Bevis

Leslie Cubitt Bevis (29 May 1892 – 23 May 1984) was a British sculptor and teacher whose most noted public work is the statue of Saint Thomas More in Chelsea Old Church, London SW3 England. He joined The Artists' Rifles, fought and was wounded in the trenches in World War 1. In World War 2 he advised on camouflage in the Middle East and Cyprus.

== Early life ==
Leslie Cubitt Bevis was the third and youngest child of William Fish Foster Bevis and Emily Anne Gosling. He was born in Maidstone, Kent where his father was a cement manufacturer. He had two older sisters, Madeline Francis and Ethel Mary. His maternal grandmother was Martha Cubitt, after whom he was named. He was known to friends and pupils as Ku, and he would sign himself as such in his letters. His parents moved several times in Kent, finally settling at Homemead, Greenhithe, Kent. He attended local schools, among them Gravesend Art School where in 1912 he was awarded a First in model drawing by the Board of Education. He studied painting at the Slade School of Fine Arts and later at Westminster School of Art, Vincent Square, where Walter Bayes was principal and had a great influence on him.

=== First World War ===
He enlisted in November 1914, joining the 28th London Regiment (Artists' Rifles) and was keen to sign up to the RAF but by March 1915 he was in France with the British Expeditionary Forces.

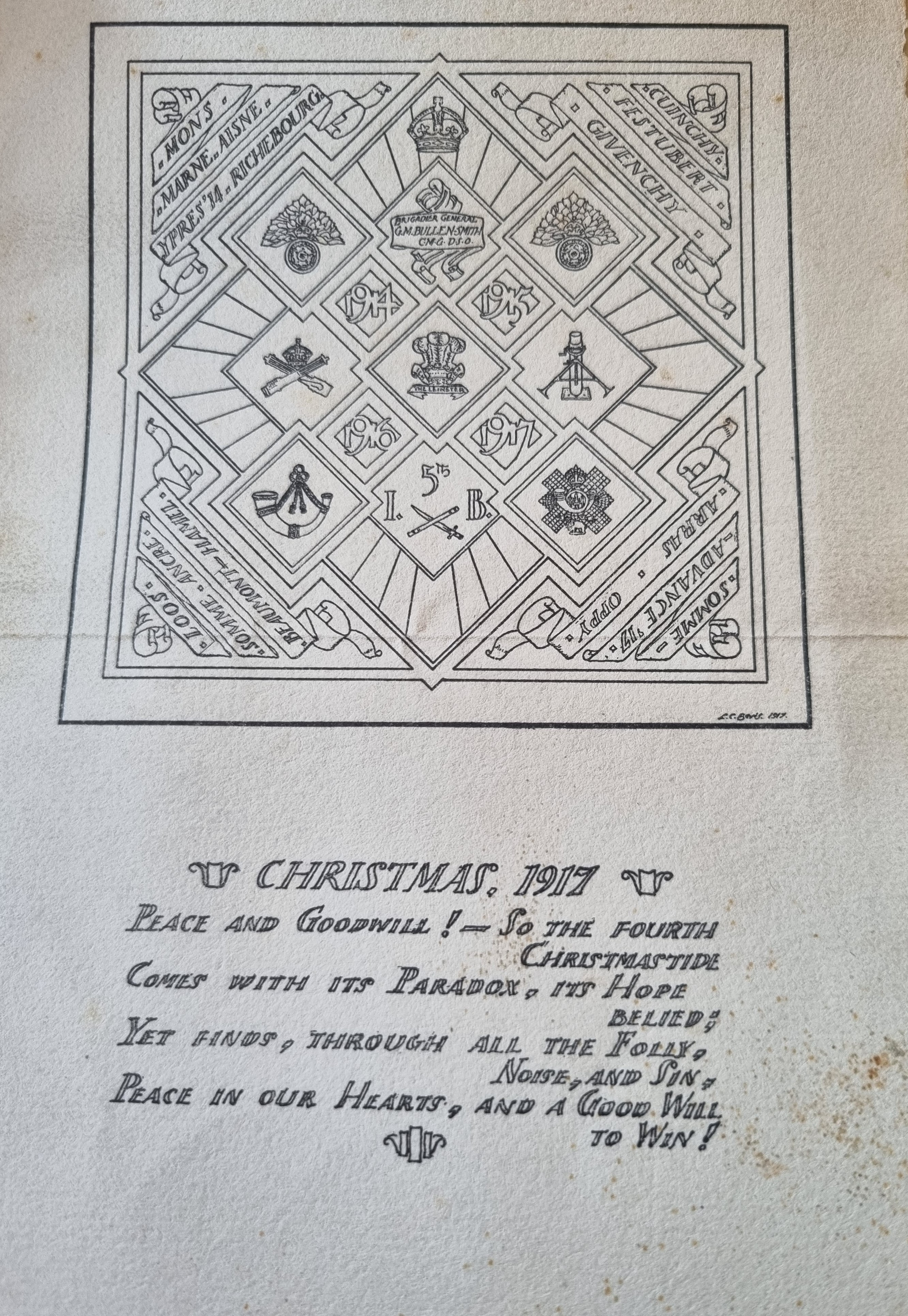
Christmas card designed by the artist Leslie Cubitt Bevis in 1917, whilst serving in the trenches.

Commissioned as a Temporary Lieutenant in the 2nd Battalion, Highland Light Infantry on 23 October 1915, he served in the 5th Light Mortar Battery. He qualified as a Battalion Grenade Officer. On 3 July 1916 he wrote requesting transfer to Royal Flying Corps as Pilot or Observer. A note on the letter, from his Captain, says he is a highly skilled Trench Mortar Officer: "he has served 9 months in trenches and his application does not arise from any cause affecting his honour or efficiency," but they want to keep him. A further note from GM Bullen-Smith, the Temporary Brigadier General of 5th Infantry Brigade, says he can't spare him.

During the winter of 1917 he designed the regimental Christmas card.

Leslie Cubitt Bevis was wounded during Operation Michael whilst in command of his company at about 2.30pm on 24 March 1918. He kept the last orders that he was sent and 54 years later reflected on the day. His blood can still be seen on the military orders. He was wounded in his left arm and later paid tribute to the surgeon who saved his left arm, "and my life'". Fortunately for his art he was right handed, but the injury affected him physically for the rest of his life. He was mentioned in dispatches from Field Marshal Sir Douglas Haig and commended for "gallant and distinguished services in the field", and a further note from his Major General commended him for his "fearlessness and good example" he set during the operation at Haplincourt.

== Inter-war years 1918–1939 ==
=== Teaching and exhibiting ===
After the war Leslie Cubitt Bevis set about establishing himself as both and artist and teacher. He worked in London, Abergavenny and Paris. He travelled abroad frequently meeting and exhibiting with other artists, going specifically to Paris in Feb 1939 to have a head cast in bronze by a firm whom he has worked with before and considered, "possibly the best in Europe.". He was part of the South London Art Group, a group of London artists mostly associated with Camberwell School of Arts and Crafts who exhibited at the South London Art Gallery. He exhibited in a number of places including with the Goupil Gallery in both London and Liverpool. In 1928 he exhibited at the Goupil Gallery, Regent Street, London, a portrait (bronze) of the sculptor's mother and with Goupil in Liverpool, alongside other young artists.

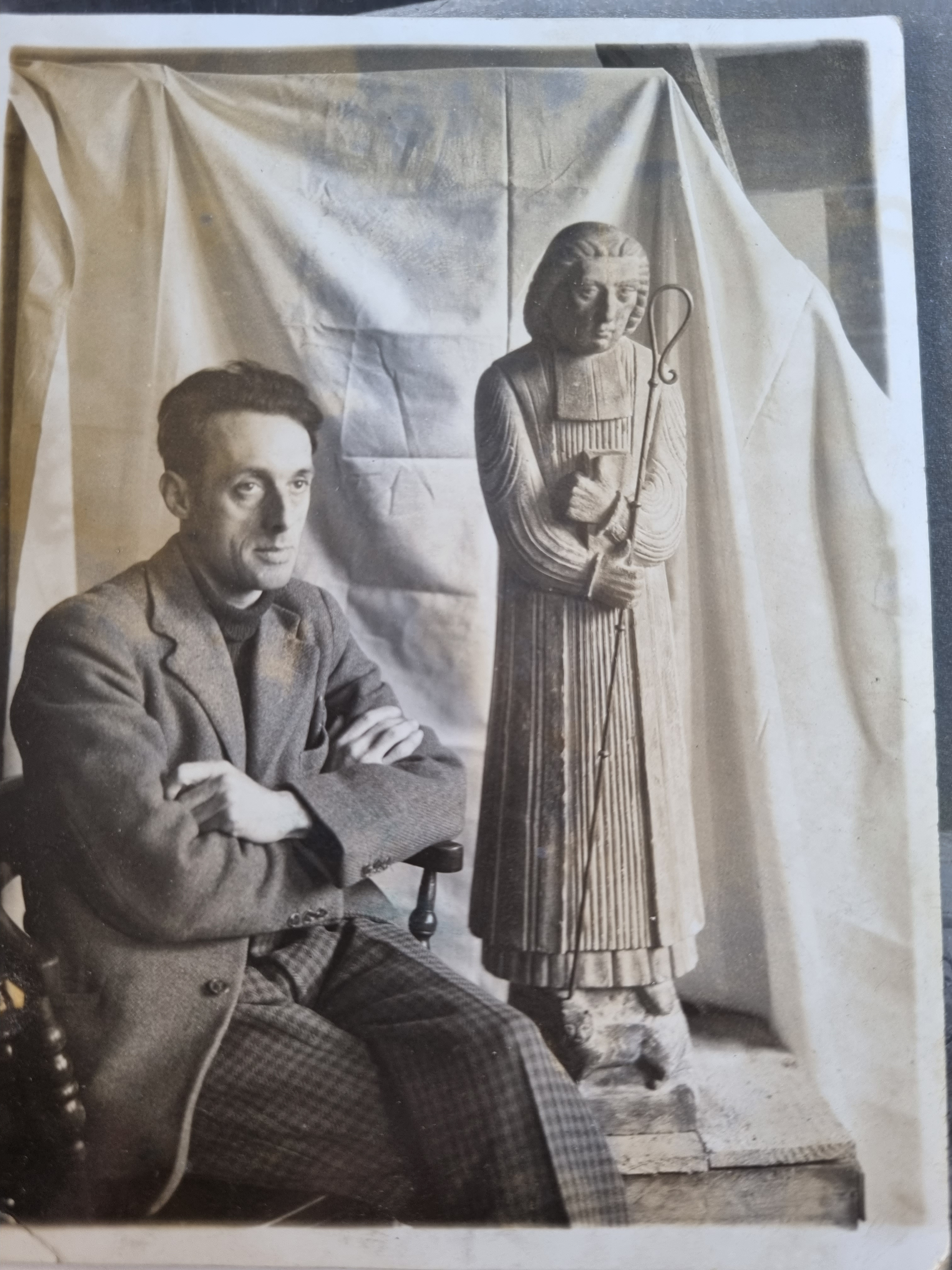

In 1938 Leslie Cubitt Bevis was commissioned by the school's Old Boys Association to create a statue for the King's School Chester of Bishop Thomas Wilson.

He taught in Bedford School and Wakefield Art School offering Drawing, Painting and Sculpture from life, Design and Wood Engraving.

He was a member of the Royal Society of British Sculptors; The Royal Institute of Oil Painters; The Royal Academy and later The Society of Portrait Sculptors. He was a founding member of the British Portrait Society.

==== Marriage ====
On 19 November 1926 he married Margaret Beatrix Shaw at Bedford Registry Office. Advised against seeing him as a suitable suitor by her father, John Howard Shaw, (Royal Engineers) she eloped by climbing out of her bedroom window. They started an unconventional married life living together and apart for a couple of years. Together they travelled to France in August 1929, starting in Dunkirk and "seeing the battle fields", on the way to Paris. They made their way to southern France and Andorra sketching as they travelled. In early 1930, when Cubitt Bevis was working as an art teacher at Bedford School, they formed an artist's commune at, Ravensden Grange, Bedfordshire, along with his cousin, Bobby De La Tour and a Capt. Woodis Rogers (Jim), whom he had met in an hotel in Bedford where they were both lodging and who worked with the airships at Cardington.

==== Divorce ====
The marriage was not a happy one. Cubitt Bevis complained that his wife neglected him and preferred the company of Woddis Rogers. His son, Charles Richard Cubitt Bevis, was born 28 April 1931. By August 1931 Leslie Cubitt Bevis was again aboard – this time in St Nicholas Du Pelem, Brittany, where, with a group of others artists he spent his time sketching and walking. He sent postcards home to his wife enquiring about his son's health, and asking her to write to him. By August 1932 their marriage had broken down. Leslie Cubitt Bevis put a legal notice in the newspaper stating, "that my wife Margaret Beatrix Cubitt Bevis has no authority to pledge my credit and that I will not be responsible for any debt incurred." That summer he moved out of Ravensden Grange to Wakefield where he took up an art master's post. He sued for divorce on the grounds of her adultery with Captain Rogers. The judge in the divorce court hearing, Sir Boyd Merriman, felt that there was no evidence of adultery from Margaret Cubitt Bevis or Captain Rogers – but stated, "if ever there were a case in which a husband did his best to throw his wife away then this is such a one". The court proceedings, which were sensationally reported in the press, obviously took a great toll on Cubitt Bevis's health and his appointment in Wakefield only lasted a term before he returned to live with his parents in Greenhithe – following illness, possibly a breakdown.

Margaret Cubitt Bevis counter sued for divorce on the grounds of his adultery which had been admitted in court, in the course of his first claim. This petition failed but was successful after going to the Court of Appeal and was granted in February 1935. The case was reported on in the national and regional daily papers for its unusual and sensational nature and in the precedent that was set.

After his divorce became absolute he continued working and exhibiting but moved around the country much often spending time abroad.

Margaret and Leslie Cubitt Bevis remained in civil contact with Cubitt Bevis apparently keen to retain contact with his son and to nurture any artistic or musical ability.

Leslie Cubitt Bevis later married Hertha Cornelia Bourighter, from Holland and they divorced in April 1949.

== Second World War ==
Leslie Cubitt Bevis is unusual in seeing active service in both world wars. He spent the later part of 1939 expecting to be called up –becoming frustrated that his previous injury to his arm meant he was not seen fit enough for the army. Camouflage was mentioned in July 1939. He received call up papers on 8 May 1940 when he was 48 years old. He was appointed Pilot Officer in Royal Air Force (Volunteer Reserves) and was sent to RAF Cranwell but after 6 months he heard that the War Office were again after him for Camouflage work – whether that would be with the RAF or the army was in dispute. In January 1941 he was working for the Air Ministry who had taken over the Shepperton Studios – his office was a dressing room, "far too many mirrors". (private letter) Still waiting in London for his next post, during February 1941, he heard that many film companies were working for the Ministry of Justice so he went along to have his voice recorded. He mentioned that, "lots of folk have suggested BBC to me in the past." ( private letter) Eventually he was given the rank of Lieutenant and was commissioned to join the Royal Engineers in France.

By June 1941 he was in the Middle East, spending time in Iran and Iraq, making recommendations about camouflage for Indian Command. He enjoyed being Staff Lieutenant and was upset when the request by Indian Command to make the post permanent was refused. In January 1942 he was posted to GS03 Cam to 25 Corps Cyprus where he took aerial photographs of camouflage in NW Cyprus and of the factory where the nets and other decoys were made. Recalled to GHQ in June 1943 and told he was urgently needed for a special post as instructor and was disappointed to discover that this was back in Cyprus at Middle East Command Camouflage School. He moved between locations including Jerusalem, Cairo and Basrah during this time. In August 1944 he was fed up with his post and wrote requesting a promotion and a new post. He cites his record in both war and complained of being overlooked. In 1944 he was posted to the Intelligence Corps pool in Rotherham, Yorkshire. He was decommissioned in July 1945 and given honorary rank of Captain.

== Teaching and exhibiting post war ==
The post war years were the most successful artistically for Leslie Cubitt Bevis. He enjoyed teaching at number of institutions including Camberwell School of Art, St Martin' School of Art and Wimbledon College of Arts. As a teacher he understudied Frank Dobson.

Cubitt Bevis was an exhibitor at the United Nations Art Exhibition held in Cairo shortly after the war.

From 1957 he settled in a large studio basement in 58 Eccleston Square, Pimlico, London. The building was the headquarters of the Buddhist Society, although Cubitt Bevis was not a Buddhist.

He became a fellow of the Royal Society of British Sculptors.

From 1946 onwards he showed regularly at the Royal Academy including in 1957 three works; Novera – a head; Pearl Mason -a head and Peter Ryder - a bronze head. In 1964 he exhibited a bust of Hugh Gaitskell, which was bought by the National Portrait Gallery, London in 1967.

== St Thomas More statue ==
Leslie Cubitt Bevis is best known for the statue of Saint Thomas More which is situated on the Chelsea Embankment in Chelsea Old Church, London, England, in what was originally Thomas More's garden.

Following a competition organised by the Chelsea Arts Club in 1965, in which a shortlist of three artists were invited to present maquettes of the brief, he was commissioned to create a portrait sculpture of St Thomas More. The statue was erected by public appeal for funding with Sir Arthur Richmond, as the chairman of the Thomas More Statue appeal committee. Many public figures and people associated with Chelsea or St Thomas Moore contributed to the fundraising including Sir Alec Guinness and Dame Sybil Thorndike who organised a Royal Gala and the Pope who made a personal gift of £1000. Cubitt Bevis worked on the statue for nearly two years in the basement of his Pimlico studio with the help of some students, including Clive Duncan, who carved the inscription on the stone plinth. During this time some changes were made in response to public discussion, including the crucifix around the statue's neck. Cubitt Bevis also invited four of his young granddaughters to add the final touches to the statue's feet and chain of office.

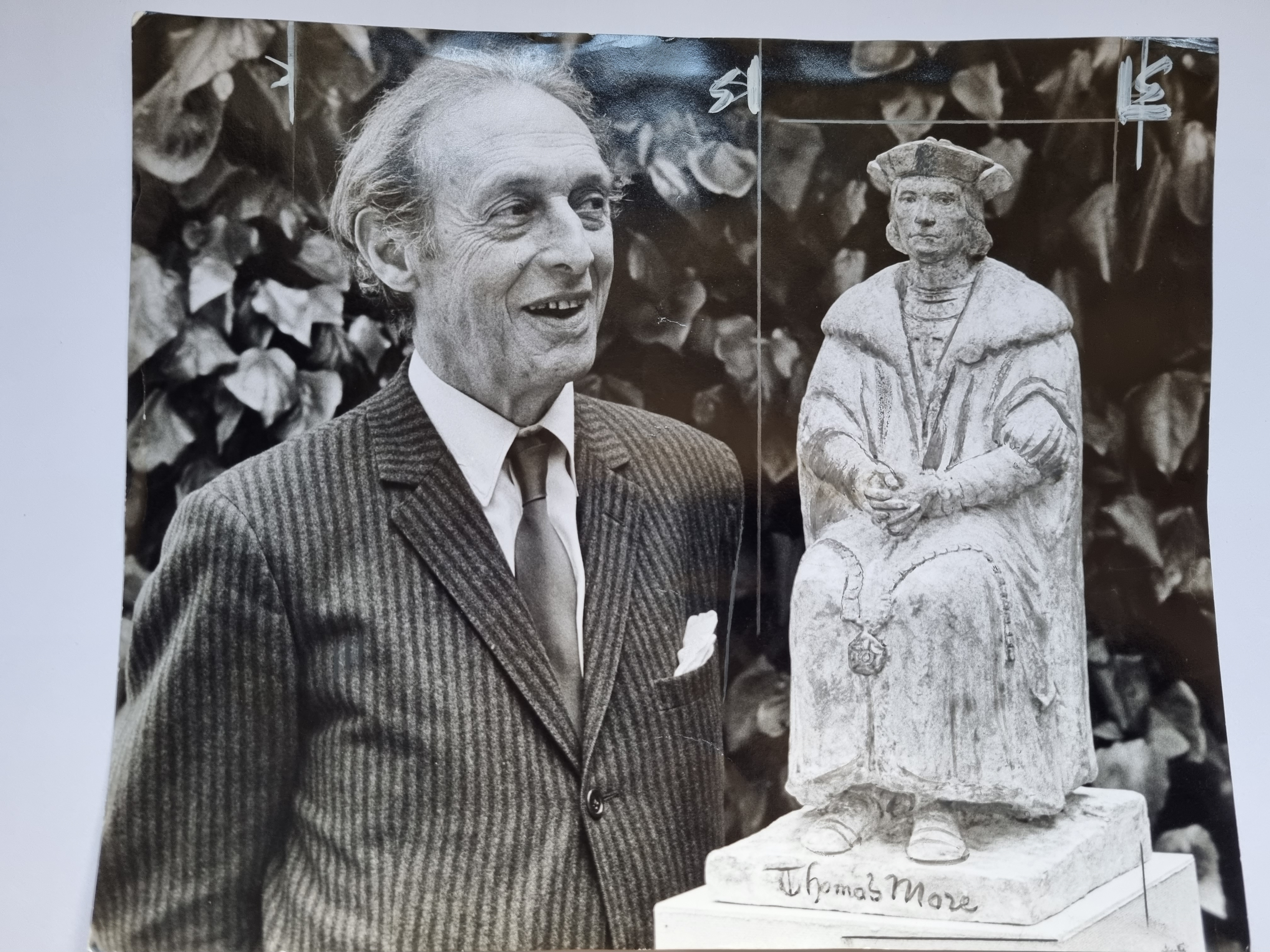
Leslie Cubitt Bevis, sculptor, with his maquette of Sir Thomas More

The plaster mould of the statue was over 6 feet tall and had to be removed from the basement studio by removing the skylights and lifting it through the roof. It was then taken to the Morris Singer, the bronze foundry which at the time was in Basingstoke.

Cubitt Bevis was very proud of the commission and the finished result. It was unveiled on 21 July by Archbishop Dr Michael Ramsey and Cardinal John Heenan, the Roman Catholic Archbishop of Westminster. A speech was made by Dr Horace King, the Speaker of House of Commons. The statue is of a seated figure with hands clasped, with the words, Statesman, Scholar, Saint written around the base plinth. It faces towards the River Thames perhaps looking for the barge that would take him to The Tower and his death. The image of the statue was based on the portrait of Sir Thomas More by Holbein. Cubitt Bevis explained at the time, that the figure was seated to reflect Thomas More's role of Speaker of the House of Commons or of Lord Chancellor on the Woolsack. The face and hands are, unusually, gold, perhaps reflecting the Buddhist statues that Cubitt Bevis saw daily in the building where he lived. Interestingly the clasp of the hands changed from a softer grasp in the original maquette to a more resolute grip in the final statue. Cubitt Bevis signed the statue on top of his hat, remarking, "only the pigeons and God can see who made this statue".

== Later works ==
Following the notable success of his statue of St Thomas More, Leslie Cubitt Bevis was commissioned to make more portrait heads along similar genres. This includes Saint John Southworth, whose image he constructed using photographs of the 300-year-old skull of the Saint. Other commissions include Pope John XXIII, commissioned in 1977 for Church of our Lady Queen of Apostles, Heston Road, Hounslow; Robert Kennedy and Rodin.

He died, aged 91 years, on 23 May 1984.
