= Baron Muncy =

Extinct barony in the Peerage of England

Baron Muncy was a title in the Peerage of England. It was created on 6 February 1299 when Walter de Muncy was summoned to parliament. At his death about ten years later, the barony became extinct.

== Baron Muncy (1299) ==
- Walter de Muncy, 1st Baron Muncy (d. c. 1309)
