= Baron FitzAlan =

Barony in the Peerage of England

The title Baron FitzAlan has been created twice in the Peerage of England.

== 1295 creation ==
The first creation (Baron FitzAlan of Bedale) was in 1295, when Bryan FitzAlan, Lord FitzAlan was summoned to Parliament as Lord FitzAlan. On his death in 1306, the peerage fell into abeyance between his two daughters.

(Sir Bryan was summoned for Military Service from 6 April 1282 to 7 November 1302, to a Military Council on 14 June 1287, and to attend upon the King at Salisbury on 26 January 1298. He was summoned to parliament from 24 June 1295 to 22 January 1305 by Writs directed to Briano filio Alani, whereby he is held to have become Lord FitzAlan. As Brianus fil. Alani d'n's [dominus] de Bedale he took part in the Barons' Letter to the Pope, dated 12 February 1301.) cited: Cokayne (1926) vol. v., p. 394

== 1627 Act of Parliament ==
In 1627 an Act of Parliament was passed “for the annexing of the Castle, &c., of Arundel, with the titles and dignities of the Baronies of FitzAlan of Clun and Oswaldestre and Maltravers, and with divers other lands, &c., being now parcels of the possessions of [him the said] Thomas, Earl of Arundel and Surrey, &c., to the same title, name, and dignity of Earl of Arundel.” "From this period, therefore, the Baronies of Clun and Oswestry (or Fitzalan of Clun and Oswestry), which hitherto had been mere feudal Lordships, may possibly be considered as separate Peerage dignities, and as being, together with Maltravers, annexed to the Earldom of Arundel." Any Barony so created is held by the Duke of Norfolk.
