= Baron Cheyne =

Extinct barony in the Peerage of England

The title of Baron Cheyne has been created twice in the Peerage of England.

== First creation ==
The first creation was for Sir John Cheyne KG, constable of Barnard Castle, who was summoned to Parliament between 22 September 1487 and 14 October 1495. He died without issue on 30 May 1499, when the peerage became extinct.

== Second creation ==
The second creation was for Sir Henry Cheyne of Toddington, son of Sir Thomas Cheyne of Shurland and nephew of the first Lord Cheyne abovenamed. He was summoned to Parliament between 8 May 1572 and 15 September 1586. The peerage became extinct when he died without male issue shortly before 3 September 1587.

== See also ==
- Viscount Newhaven, also created Lord Cheyne
