= Chelsea Old Church =

Coordinates: 51°28′59″N 0°10′15″W

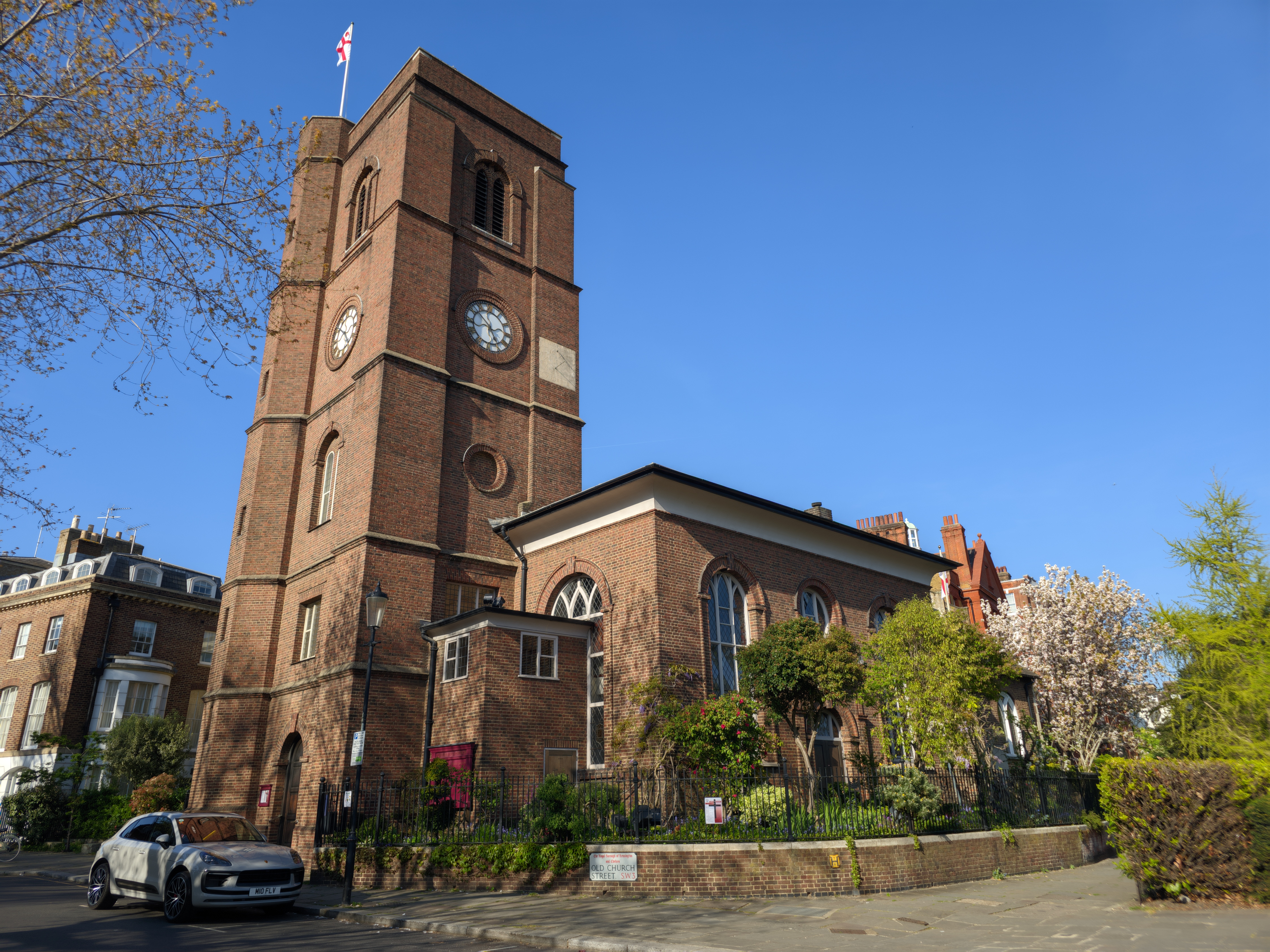
- Chelsea Old Church
- Location: Old Church Street and Cheyne Walk, London
- Country: England
- Denomination: Church of England
- Churchmanship: Prayer Book Catholic
- Website: www.chelseaoldchurch.org.uk

History
- Status: Parish church

Architecture
- Functional status: Active
- Years built: 12th century

Administration
- Diocese: Diocese of London

Clergy
- Vicar: The Revd Max Bayliss

Listed Building – Grade I
- Official name: Chelsea Old Church (All Saints)
- Designated: 24 June 1954; Amended 18 December 1992
- Reference no.: 1189649

Chelsea Old Church, also known as All Saints, is an Anglican church, on Old Church Street, Chelsea, London SW3, England, near Albert Bridge. It is the church for a parish in the Diocese of London, part of the Church of England. Inside the Grade I listed building, there is seating for 400 people. There is a memorial plaque to the author Henry James (1843–1916) who lived nearby on Cheyne Walk, and was buried in Cambridge, Massachusetts. To the west of the church is a small public garden containing a sculpture by Sir Jacob Epstein.

== History ==
=== Norman origins ===
Chelsea Old Church dates from 1157. It was formerly the parish church of Chelsea, before it was engulfed by London. The building consisted of a 13th-century chancel with chapels to the north and south (c. 1325) and a nave and tower built in 1670.

=== 16th century and Sir Thomas More ===
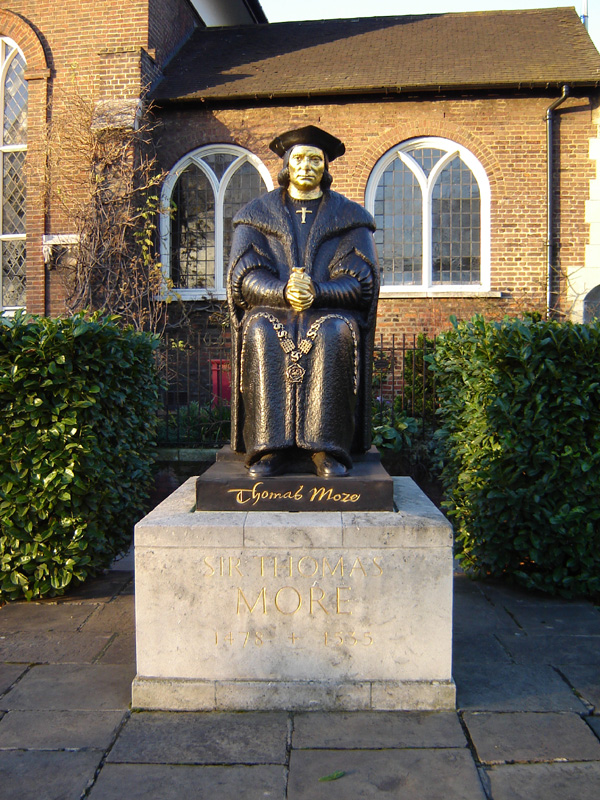
Thomas More's statue in front of the Church

The chapels were private property. The one to the north was called the Lawrence Chapel and was owned by Chelsea's Lord of the manor. The chapel to the south was rebuilt in 1528 as Sir Thomas More's private chapel. The date can be found on one of the capitals of the pillars leading to the chancel, which were reputedly designed by Hans Holbein the Younger. There is a statue of More by Leslie Cubitt Bevis outside the church, facing the river.

=== 17th century ===
There is a 1669 memorial to Lady Jane Cheyne. It was designed by the son of Gian Lorenzo Bernini and executed by Gian Lorenzo's favourite sculptor Antonio Raggi.

It is the only London church to have chained books. They were the gift of Sir Hans Sloane, Bt, the Anglo-Irish physician, naturalist collector, Member of the British Parliament and President of the Royal Society. The books consist of a copy of the so-called "Vinegar Bible" of 1717 (containing a misprint of the word 'vineyard'), two volumes of Foxe's Book of Martyrs (1684 edition), a 1723 printing of the Book of Common Prayer and a 1683 edition of The Books of Homilies.

=== 19th century ===
The church appears in several paintings by James McNeill Whistler and J. M. W. Turner, in all cases little more than distant tower; the church was painted white in the 19th century. For example, the church was depicted in the background of Whistler's Nocturne: Blue and Gold - Old Battersea Bridge, painted c. 1872–1875.

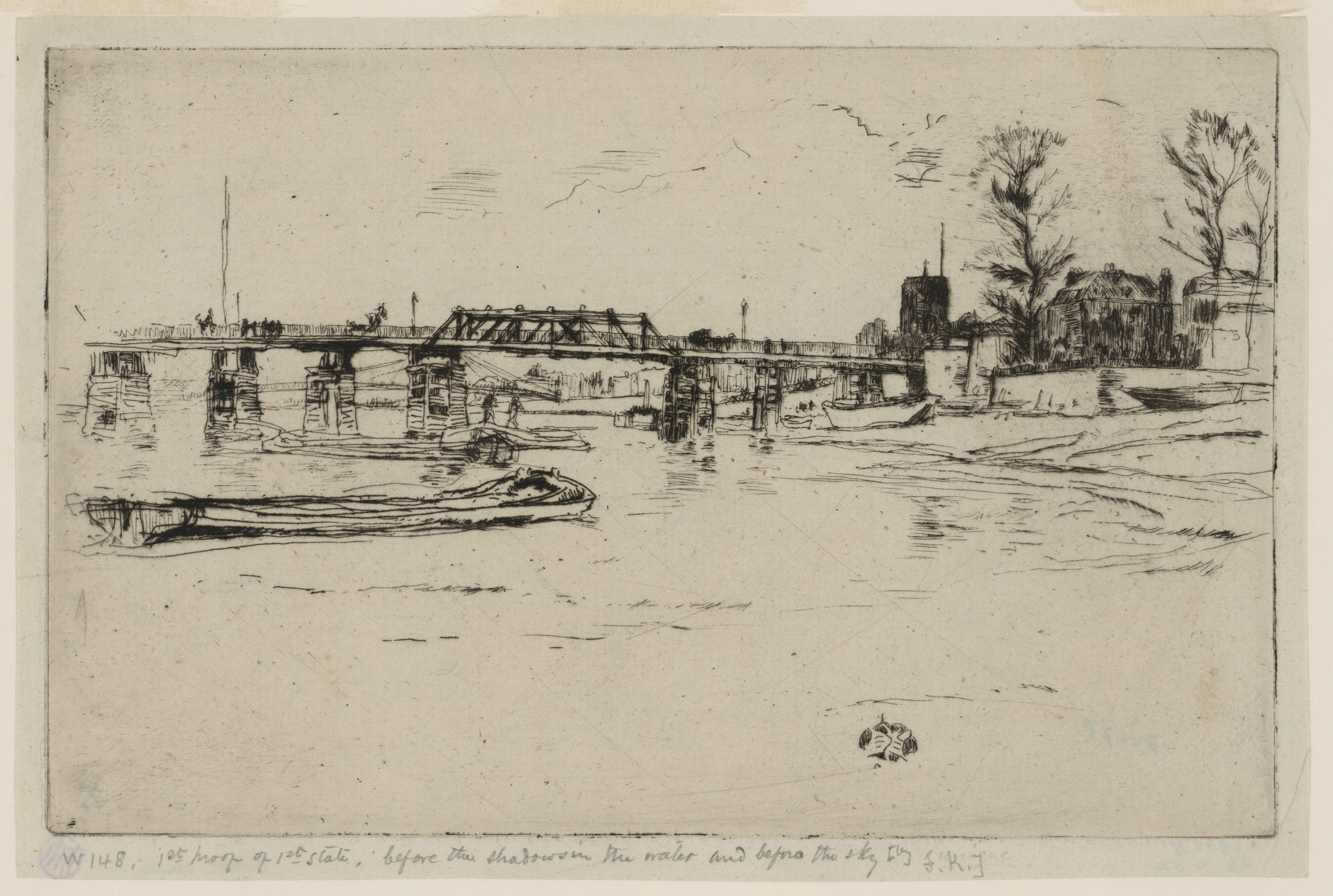
Chelsea: Battersea Bridge and Chelsea Church, James McNeill Whistler, c. 1879

=== Second World War ===
The church suffered severe bombing damage during the Blitz of the Second World War on 14 April 1941, in which the church and tower were mostly destroyed by a parachute mine. The Thomas More Chapel was least affected. Services were held in the adjoining Cheyne Hospital for nine years.

=== Restoration and rebuilding ===
In 1950 the More Chapel was reopened, followed by the chancel and Lawrence Chapel in May 1954, after restoration by the architect Walter Godfrey. It was then listed Grade I on 24 June 1954. In May 1958, the entire church was reconsecrated by the Bishop of London in the presence of Queen Elizabeth The Queen Mother, as it had been restored in its entirety on its old foundations. It looks much as it did before World War II. Many of the tombs and monuments inside were salvaged and reconstructed, almost like jigsaw puzzles. Some original 16th-century stained glass was also preserved.

In 1978, Jack Leslau wrote an article in The Ricardian suggesting that one of the Princes in the Tower survived, namely Edward V of England, and was buried in Chelsea Old Church. His evidence depends on a complex interpretation of a painting by Hans Holbein the Younger. Leslau's website expands on this, but no major academic institution has endorsed the thesis. The social reformer Catherine Courtney (1847–1929) is buried in the church.

In 2000, the Museum of London Archaeological Services carried out an archaeological dig at the cemetery.

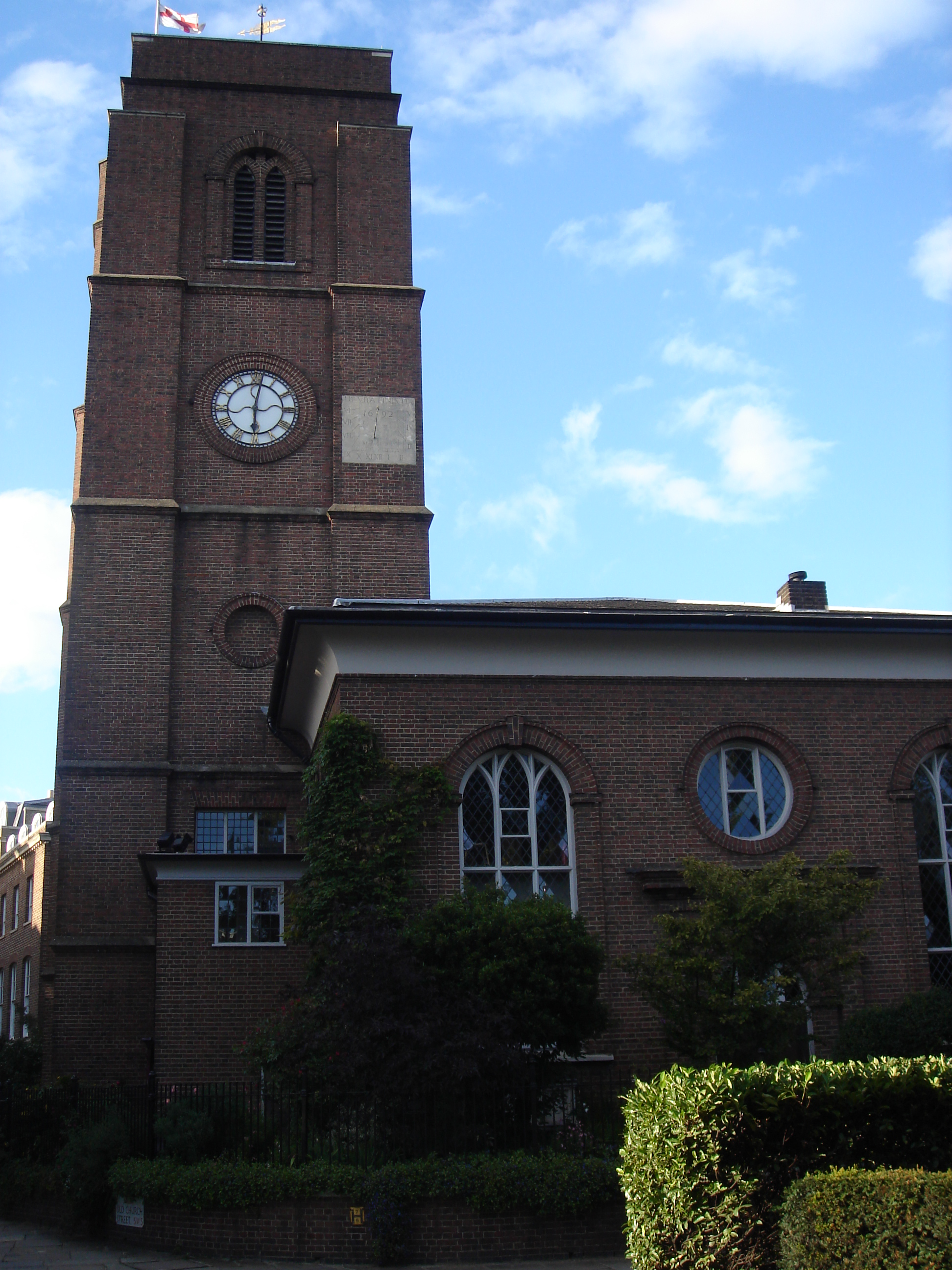
Chelsea Old Church

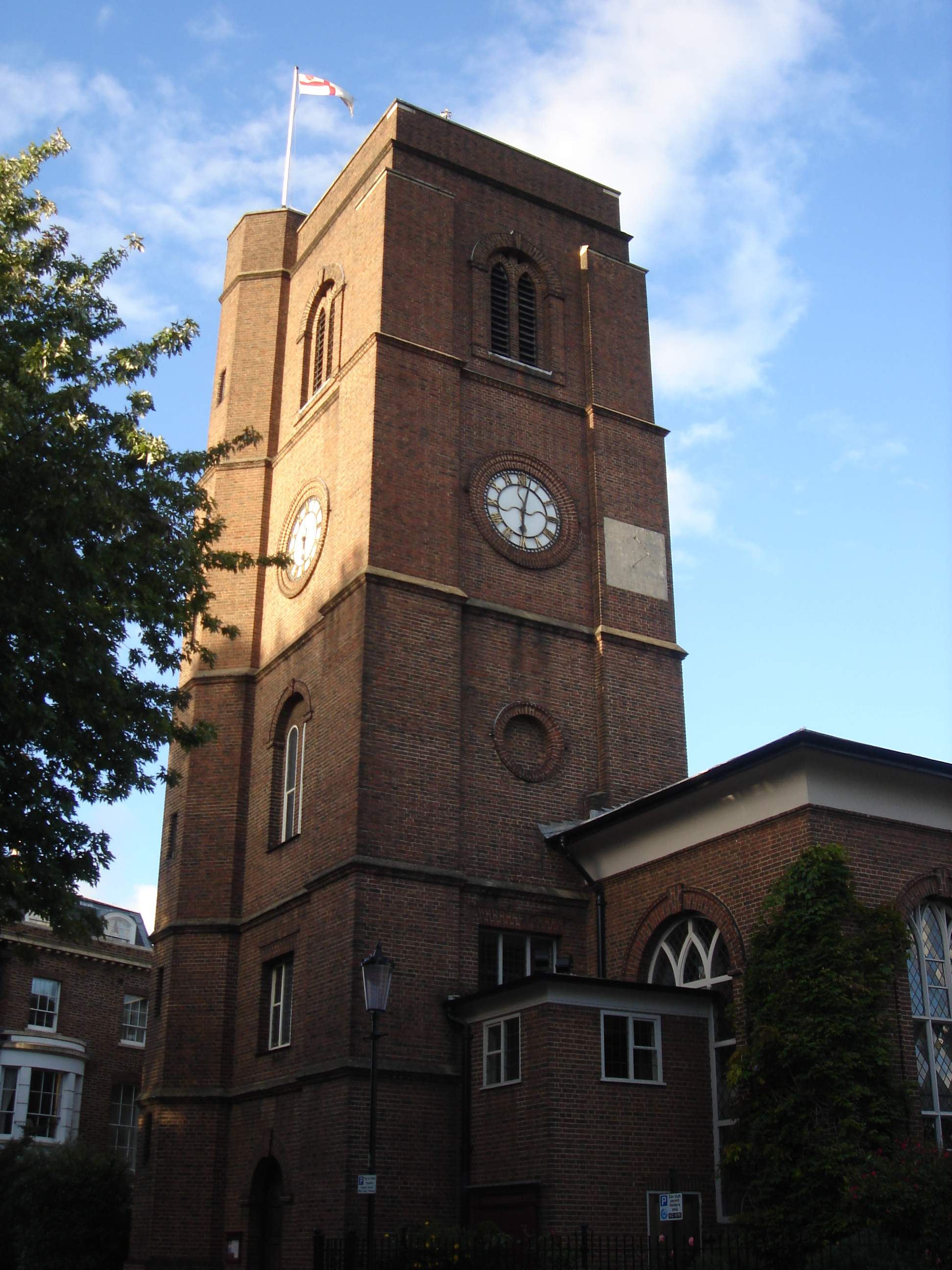
Chelsea Old Church

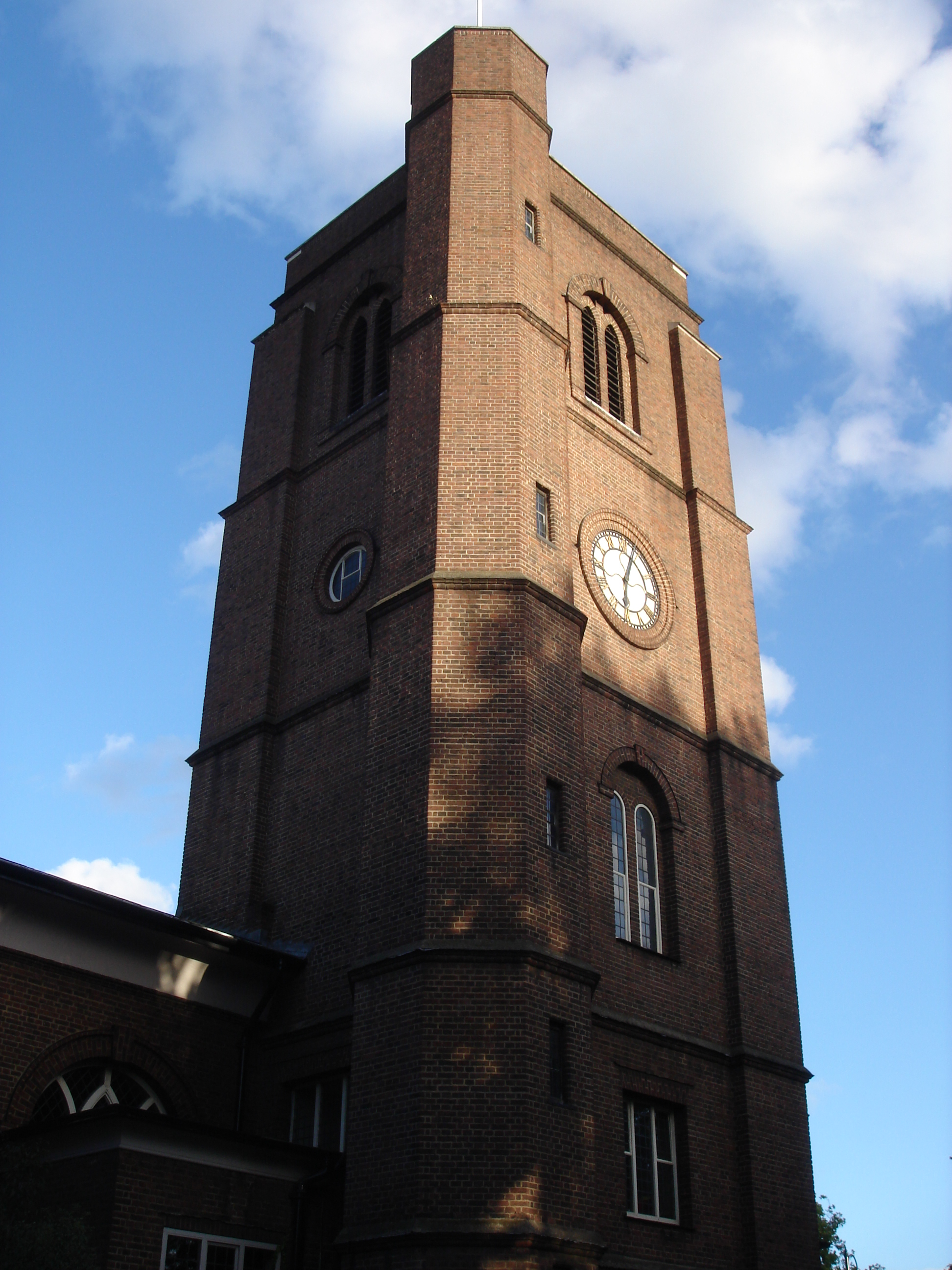
Chelsea Old Church

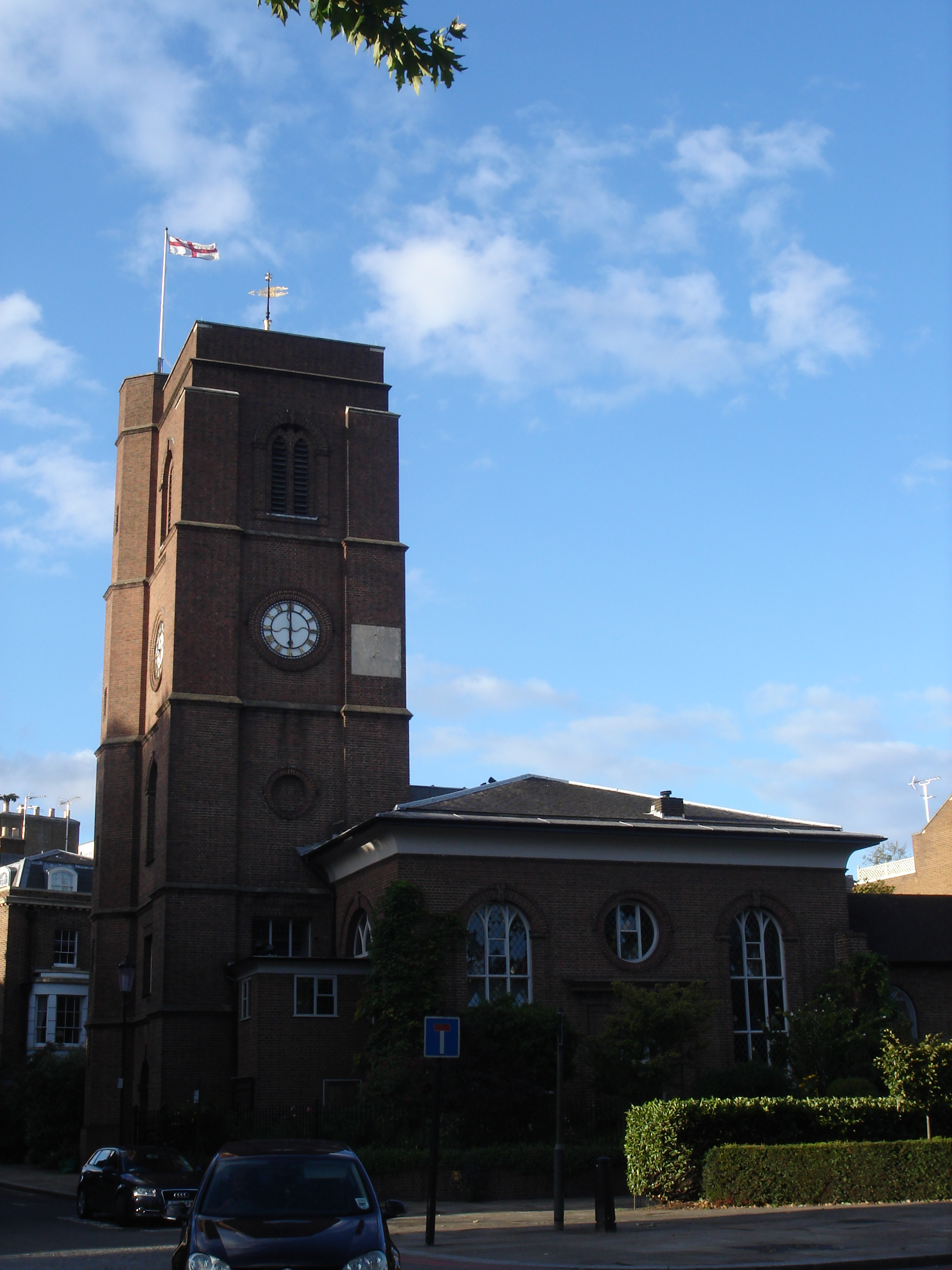
Chelsea Old Church

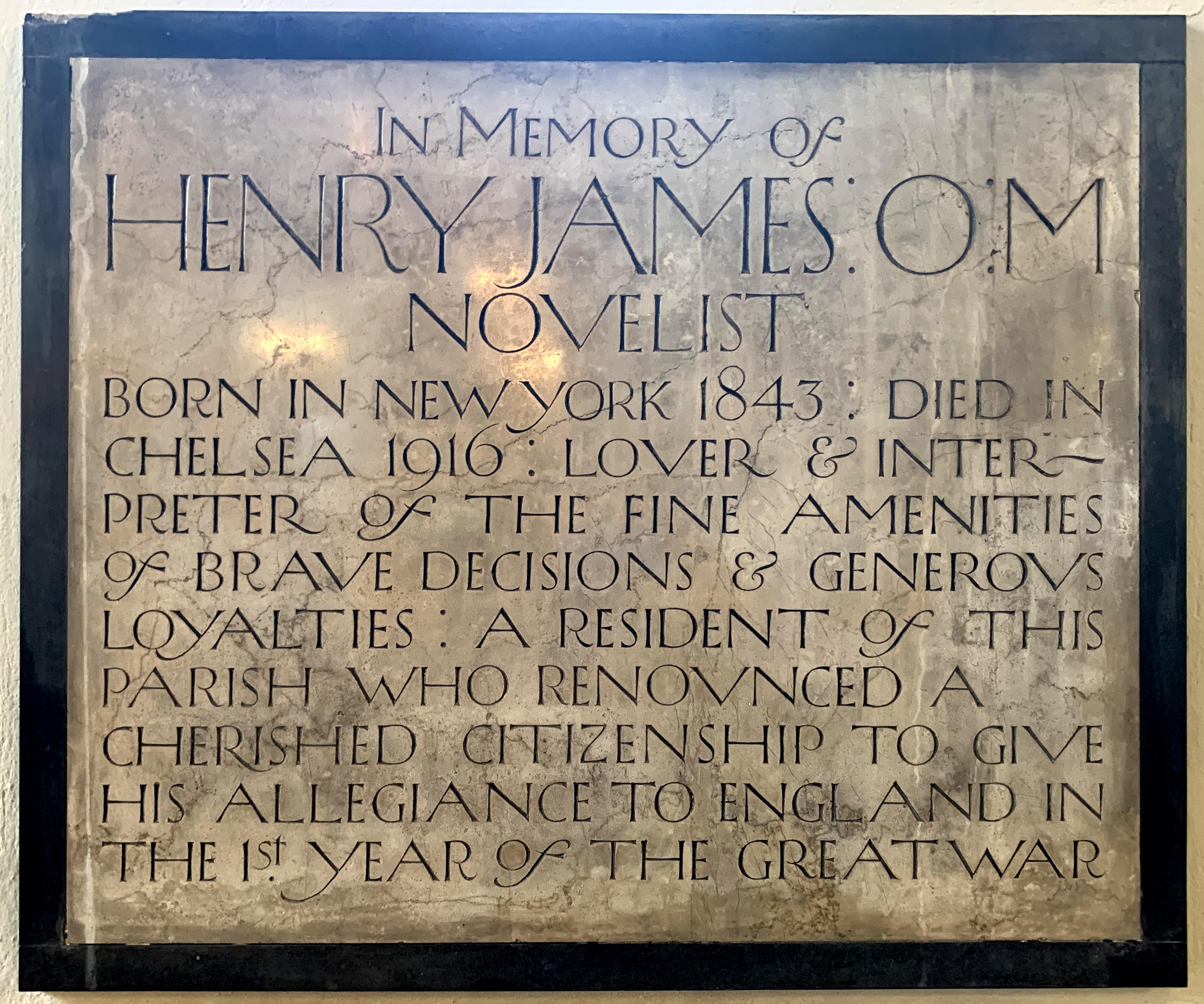
Memorial to author Henry James at Chelsea Old Church, London

== Burials ==
- Jane, Duchess of Northumberland (died 1555)
- John Braye, 2nd Baron Braye (died 1557)
- The 10th Baron Dacre (died 1594)
- Anne, Baroness Dacre (died 1595)
- Katherine, Countess of Huntingdon (died 1620)
- Sir Robert Stanley (died 1632, with verses on the tomb alleged to point to the true author of the works of Shakespeare)
- Sir Hans Sloane (died 1753)
- Catherine Courtney, Baroness Courtney of Penwith (died 1929)
