= Baron Lancaster =

Barony in the Peerage of England

Baron Lancaster or Lord Lancaster was a parliamentary baronial title in the peerage of England, apparently created twice in 1299.

== Lancaster of Grisedale, Westmorland ==
- John de Lancastre (d. 1334), was summoned to parliament for the first time 29 December 1299, and is therefore considered to have become Lord Lancaster. On his death the implied title became extinct, as he had no heir.

== The Earls and Dukes of Lancaster ==
This title is listed in Complete Peerage because of a single parliamentary summons but was not used in practice because all the heirs and theoretical holders of this title inherited more important titles, being Earls or Dukes of Lancaster. Those titles are now part of the inheritance of the kings and queens of England.

- Henry of Lancaster (c.1281-1345), grandson of Henry III, and younger brother and eventual heir of Thomas, 2nd Earl of Lancaster. He was summoned to parliament 6 February 1299 as Henry of Lancaster, while his brother was still Earl of Lancaster. He is therefore considered to have become "Lord Lancaster" before he became an Earl.
- Henry of Grosmont, Duke of Lancaster (c.1310-1361) is considered to have inherited the title as son, although more importantly he inherited the Earldom of Lancaster, and eventually became the first Duke of Lancaster.
- From Henry's death until the death of his eldest daughter Maud, the title is considered to have been in abeyance. (With no sons and two daughters, Henry's inheritance was divided.) After Maud died the title is considered to have been inherited by his younger daughter Blanche, who was then his only heir.
- Blanche, 3rd Baroness Lancaster (1345-1368) became sole heiress in 1362. John of Gaunt, her husband, third of the five adult sons of Edward III (1340-1399) then became the second Duke of Lancaster.
- King Henry IV of England (1367-1413) was the heir of John and Blanche and became king in 1399.
