= Torksey ware =

Early Medieval pottery produced in Torksey, Lincolnshire

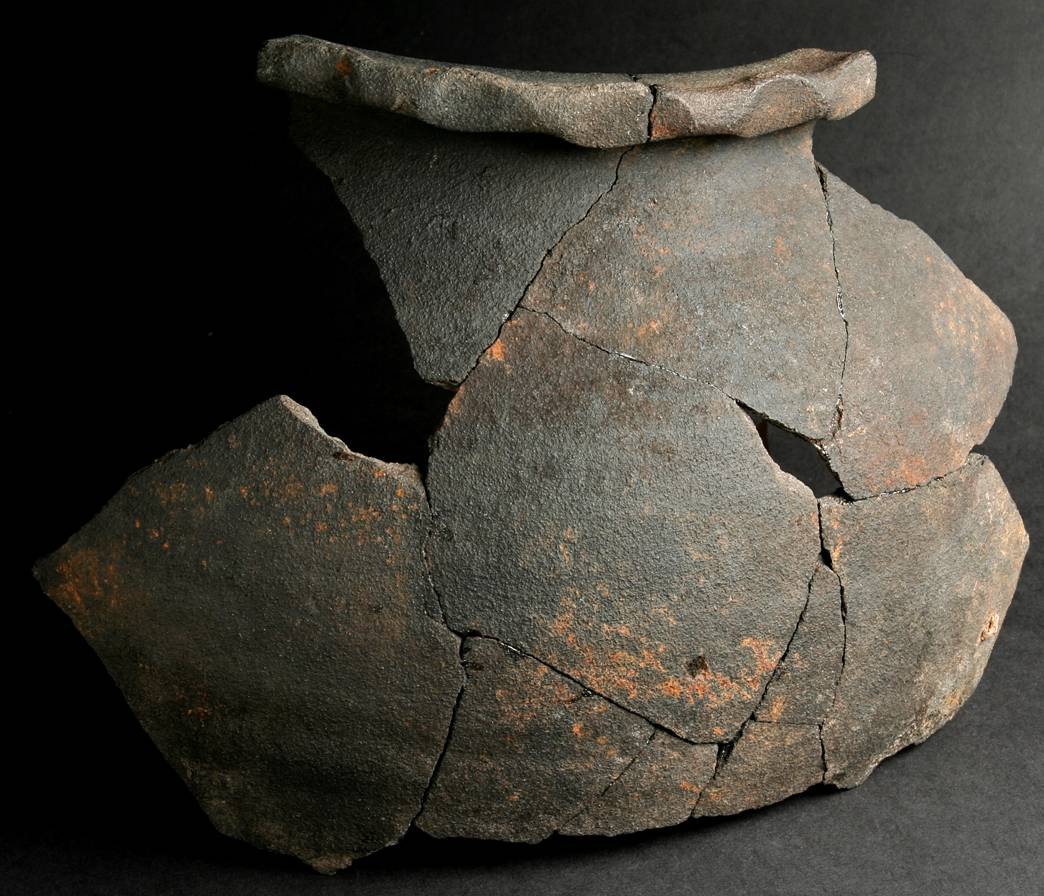
- Torksey ware with thumb-impressed rim
- Material: Ceramic
- Culture: Viking

Torksey ware is a type of early medieval pottery produced near Torksey, Lincolnshire in the 9th to 11th centuries AD.

== Industry ==
Torksey ware is one of the first wheel-thrown industries to emerge in post-Roman England. It was centred around a series of kilns to the south of the modern village. The first sherds were identified at the site by archaeologists in 1949, with subsequent discoveries of the first seven kilns in 1960–1968 revealing the core group. Excavations between 1995 and 2008 revealed a further eight kilns around Torksey.

Similar variants to the Torksey ware products have been identified in York. Although they were originally believed to be imported from Torksey, more recent analysis suggests that they are local variant produced somewhere closer to York and are referred to, instead, as Torksey-type wares.

== Fabric and decoration ==
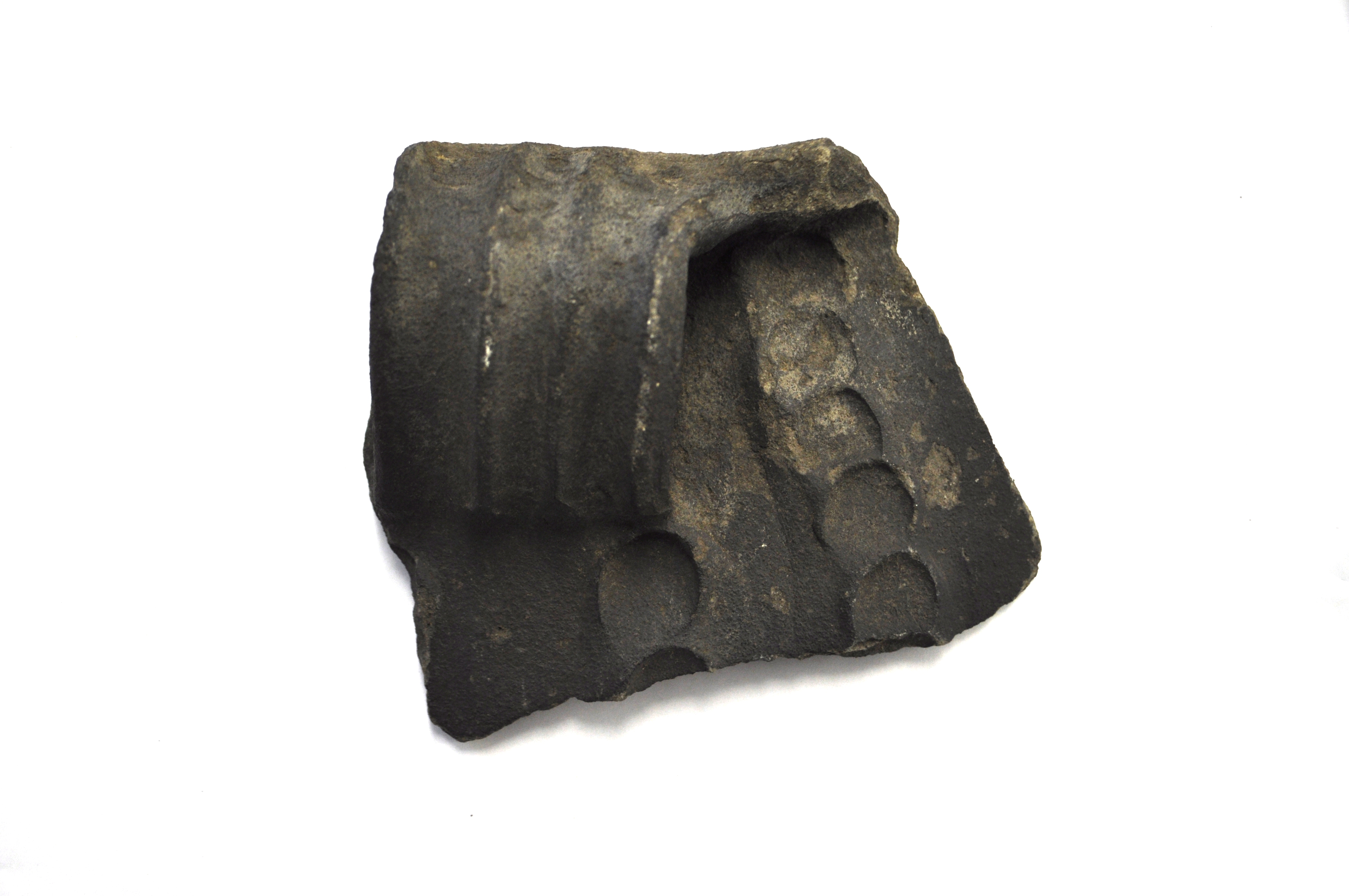
Torksey Ware sherd in the collection of the Yorkshire Museum

Torksey ware vessels almost always have a grey or black coloured surface and oxidised red or reddish-brown cores. Some sherds are fully reduced and have lighter pale grey cores instead. Products from Kiln 2 are coloured grey or black throughout, suggesting a different technique used at this kiln to the others. A single fabric was used throughout the life of the Torksey ware industry. It is further characterised by the inclusion of rounded quartz grains used in the temper.

Approximately 5% of Torksey ware vessels were decorated. This could include rouletting at the rim or shoulder or a characteristic 'pie-crust' rim made with thumb-impressions. Rouletting was more commonly used in the early phases of the industry and then thumb-impression became more popular in the larger phases. Thumb-impressions can also be found on the body of some vessels.
