= History of Corsica =

Paoli's flag of the Corsican Republic. The figure, known as "the Moor's head", originated on the blazon of the kingdom of Aragon in Spain. It was originally the head (detached or undetached in various theories) of a blindfolded prisoner and represented the clearing of the Moors from the Iberian Peninsula. It became relevant to Corsica in the 13th century Kingdom of Sardinia and Corsica sponsored by Aragon, although its use by any Corsican chiefs is debatable. For some reason, Theodore of Corsica chose it for his independent kingdom of Corsica, whether through showmanship or because he wanted a symbol of struggle against foreign domination. Paoli adopted it to continue the tradition of an independent Corsica, as he had practically stepped into Neuhoff's shoes. The blindfold proved too ferocious and was diminished to a headband.

The history of Corsica goes back to antiquity, and was known to Herodotus, who described Phoenician habitation in the 6th century BC. Etruscans and Carthaginians expelled the Ionian Greeks, and remained until the Romans arrived during the Punic Wars in 237 BC. Vandals occupied it in 430 AD, followed by the Byzantine Empire a century later.

Raided by various Germanic and other groups for two centuries, it was conquered in 774 by Charlemagne under the Holy Roman Empire, which fought for control against the Saracens. After a period of feudal anarchy, the island was transferred to the papacy, then to city states Pisa and Genoa, which retained control over it for five centuries, until the establishment of the Corsican Republic in 1755. The French gained control in the 1768 Treaty of Versailles. Corsica was briefly independent as a Kingdom in union with Great Britain after the French Revolution in 1789, with a viceroy and elected Parliament, but returned to French rule in 1796.

Corsica strongly supported the allies in World War I, caring for wounded, and housing POWs. The poilus fought loyally and suffered great casualties. A recession after the war prompted a mass exodus to southern France. Wealthy Corsicans became colonizers in Algeria and Indochina.

After the Fall of France in 1940, Corsica was part of the southern zone libre of the Vichy regime. Fascist leader Benito Mussolini agitated for Italian control, supported by Corsican irredentists. In 1942, Italy occupied Corsica with a huge force. German forces took over in 1943 after the Allied armistice with Italy. The Germans faced opposition from the French Resistance, retreating and evacuating the island by October 1943. Corsica then became an Allied air base, supporting the Mediterranean Theater in 1944, and the invasion of southern France in August 1944. Since the war, Corsica has developed a thriving tourism industry, and has been known for its independence movements, sometimes violent.

== Geography ==
Corsica's strategic position in the western Mediterranean has significantly influenced its history. The island lies approximately 12 kilometers (7.5 miles) north of Sardinia, separated by the Strait of Bonifacio. It is about 50 kilometers (30 miles) west of the Isle of Elba, 80 kilometers (50 miles) from the coast of Tuscany, and approximately 170 kilometers (105 miles) from the French port of Nice.

Covering an area of 8,722 square kilometers (3,368 square miles), Corsica is the fourth-largest island in the Mediterranean Sea, following Sicily, Sardinia, and Cyprus.

== Prehistory ==
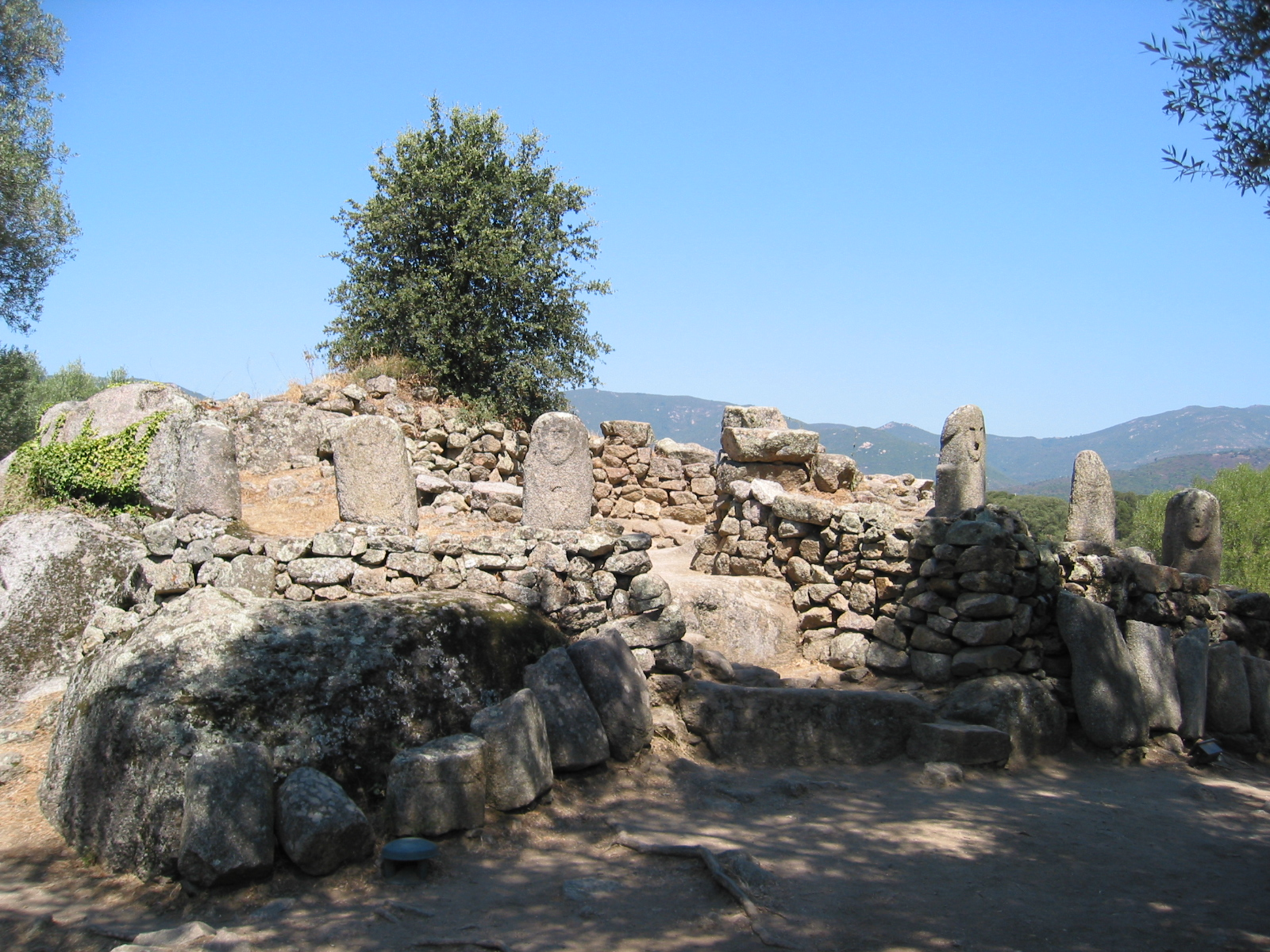
Prehistoric structures at Filitosa

The prehistory of Corsica covers the long period from the Upper Paleolithic to the first historical event, the founding of Aléria by the ancient Greeks in 566 BC.

During the Ice Ages, the average level of the Mediterranean Sea dropped and several natural bridges were created that allowed the passage of fauna from the Italian mainland to the Sardinian-Corsican archipelago, passing through the islands of the Tuscan archipelago and crossing at most a narrow stretch of sea. Around 12-14 000 years ago, the climate began the evolution that led it to its present form, and Corsica, detached from the Tyrrhenian Sea, assumed its present-day island configuration. In the 19th century BC, the hypothesis was developed that man may also have populated these lands by reaching them on foot when it was not yet completely an island; This thesis of Docteur Mattei was taken up by Count Colonna de Cesari Rocca, who noted how, at the time of his writing, anthropologists were becoming interested in the curious behavioural similarities between the characters of certain types of Corsican and Albanian people.

The first deposits of chipped stones and sculptural sketches found so far in Corsica, in the region of Porto-Vecchio, date back to around 9000 BC (Romanellian). A female skeleton (la dame de Bonifacio) was found near the town of the same place.

The Early Neolithic is represented in Corsica by finds of cardinal pottery and imported obsidian. The major influences seem to come from both Tuscany and Sardinia.

In later phases, an important megalithic civilisation developed in Corsica, which left on the island dolmens (stazzòne, found near Cauria and Pagliagio), menhirs (stantare) and the original statues-menhirs, concentrated mainly in the south, at the site of Filitosa and that of Funtanaccia, near Sartene, but also present in the north, near San Fiorenzo. The site of Filitosa - a UNESCO World Heritage Site - is located near Sollacaro, towards the sea outlet of the Taravo Valley). According to the archaeologist Giovanni Lilliu, in the second half of the 4th millennium B.C., Corsica was invested by a cultural current called the Culture of Arzachena, also known as the Corsican-Gallurese cultural facies, secondary to the cultural complex known as the Culture of Ozieri and extended over the whole of Sardinia.

The Corsican-Gallurese facies mainly affected the whole of Gallura with expansion beyond the Straits of Bonifacio into southern Corsica. According to G. Lilliu, this facies showed a society with an aristocratic and individualistic background, and was clearly distinguished from the predominant facies of Ozieri, which tended to be democratic and had clear influences from the eastern Mediterranean. The pastoral, aristocratic facies of Arzachena and the democratic agricultural culture of Ozieri constituted the most important sociological component of the pre-Nuragic Sardinian populations.

The Corsican Eneolithic is characterised by the Torrean civilization, which takes its name from the site of Terrina, on the central-eastern coast, where techniques related to copper metallurgy were widespread. In the Early Bronze Age, northern influences from the Polada culture are recorded on the island, as well as in Sardinia.

In this phase, the Torrean civilisation developed in the south. Numerous megalithic towers with a structure similar to that of the "Sardinian nuraghi" remain today from this culture. Due to the nature of the finds, their age and location, scholars have ascertained that this civilisation was an extension of the coeval civilisation that developed in Sardinia. According to an invasionist theory, mainly developed by Grosjean in the 1970s, the Torreani (whom the author makes out to be the ancient sea people of the Sherden) got the better of the megalithic people and drove them towards the centre and north of the island. However, this theory is no longer accepted by most scholars who see the Torreani as the evolution of the local Neoeneolithic communities. It was in this period that the people that the Greeks would call "Κὁρυιοι, Còrsi", also attested in Gallura and perhaps of Ligurian ancestry, as toponyms such as Asco and Venzolasca, with the typical suffix in ‘-asco’, would seem to suggest.

== Classical antiquity ==
=== Name ===
The ancient Greeks, notably Herodotus, called the island Kurnos or Kyrnos (from kur or kyr meaning cape); the name Corsica is Latin and was in use in the Roman Republic.

Why Herodotus used Kyrnos and not some other name remains a mystery, and the phrases of the authors give no clue. The Roman historians, however, believed Corsa or Corsica (rightly or wrongly they interpreted -ica as an adjectival formative ending) was the native name of the island, but they could not give an explanation of its meaning. They did think that the natives were originally Ligures.

== Iron Age and ancient history ==
=== Greek and Etruscan period ===
Beginning on the island around the 8th century BC, the Iron Age ended with Corsica's entry into history when the colony of Alalia was founded by Ionian Greek colonists, the Phocians of Marseille, in 565 or 562 BC, near the site of the present-day town of Aleria. The Greeks called the island first Kalliste and later Cyrnos, Cernealis, Corsis and Cirné. Herodotus spoke of the Phocaeans, thus leaving the first documentary trace of the island, and narrated that after the foundation of Alalia other Phocaeans reached the island to escape the risk of being enslaved by the Persians.

In 535 B.C., following the battle of the Sardinian sea, they in turn were driven out by an Etruscan-Carthaginian coalition formed on the basis of a pact that had been drawn up for the purpose and which, after the conflict, provided for the division of the two islands over which influence had been won: Sardinia to the Carthaginians, Corsica to the Etruscans. In fact, according to Herodotus, the Phocians had won, but it was a Cadmean victory, since of the 60 ships employed (half the total armament of the opposing fleets) 40 were sunk and the remainder rendered unserviceable. The Phocaeans then left Corsica and the Carthaginians and Etruscans were thus able to implement the partition pact equally. The Etruscans therefore resumed that control over the eastern shores of the island that they had previously consolidated with the activity of the warships of Pisa, Volterra, Populonia, Tarquinia and Cere. Their presence is attributed to the toponym Tarco on the south-eastern coast, which recalls the city of Tarquinia.

Italy in 400 BC.

This was followed by the incursions of the Siceliots from Syracuse, who founded a legendary Portus Syracusanus in the 5th century B.C., and again by the Carthaginians (4th century B.C.). The Syracusans first made a move towards the island under the command of Apello in 453 BC, but it was in 384 BC, under Dionysius I, that they launched their most important attack, since it was aimed not only at Corsica but also at the island of Elba and the Tuscan coast. The Portus Syracusanus has been classically identified at the site of today's Porto Vecchio, however there are several scholars from different periods who refute this thesis, arguing that it may have been in the Gulf of Santa Amanza, or in Bonifacio.

Province of Corsica et Sardinia in the Roman Empire

=== Roman era ===
Corsica came under Roman control in 238 BC, during the First Punic War, when Rome annexed both Corsica and Sardinia from Carthage, exploiting Carthage's internal struggles during the Mercenary War. The islands were officially organized into the Roman province of Sardinia et Corsica in 227 BC, marking one of Rome's earliest overseas provincial establishments. The Roman conquest faced significant resistance from the indigenous Corsican tribes, particularly in the island's rugged interior. Rebellions were frequent, with notable uprisings occurring in 231 BC, which was suppressed by Gaius Papirius Maso, who celebrated a triumph on Mons Albanus.

Despite resistance, the Romans established several colonies to solidify their control. Gaius Marius founded Colonia Mariana in the northeast around 104 BC, and Sulla established Colonia Veneria Alaria at Aléria between 82 and 80 BC. Aléria, originally a Phocaean Greek settlement known as Alalia, became a significant Roman city and naval base, with a population reaching approximately 20,000 at its peak. Roman infrastructure on Corsica was limited, with only one known major road running along the east coast from Piantarella through Aléria to Mariana. The Romans exploited the island's natural resources, including timber, iron, and salt, and introduced viticulture.

Under Augustus's provincial reforms in 27 BC, Sardinia et Corsica became a senatorial province. In 6 AD, Corsica was separated into its own senatorial province, while Sardinia became an imperial province due to its strategic importance and the need for a substantial military presence. Corsica's administrative status fluctuated over time, alternating between senatorial and imperial control. The island remained relatively peaceful during the early Imperial period, with few significant events recorded. Notably, the philosopher Seneca was exiled to Corsica from 41 to 49 AD, during which time he wrote several works.

As the Western Roman Empire weakened, Corsica became vulnerable to external threats. In 430 AD, the Vandals, a Germanic tribe that had established a kingdom in North Africa, conquered Corsica, integrating it into their maritime domain. In 534 AD, during the Vandalic War, the Byzantine Empire under Emperor Justinian I launched a campaign to reclaim former Western Roman territories. Corsica was recovered by Byzantine forces, restoring imperial control and introducing Eastern Roman (Byzantine) administrative and cultural influences to the island.

== Middle Ages ==
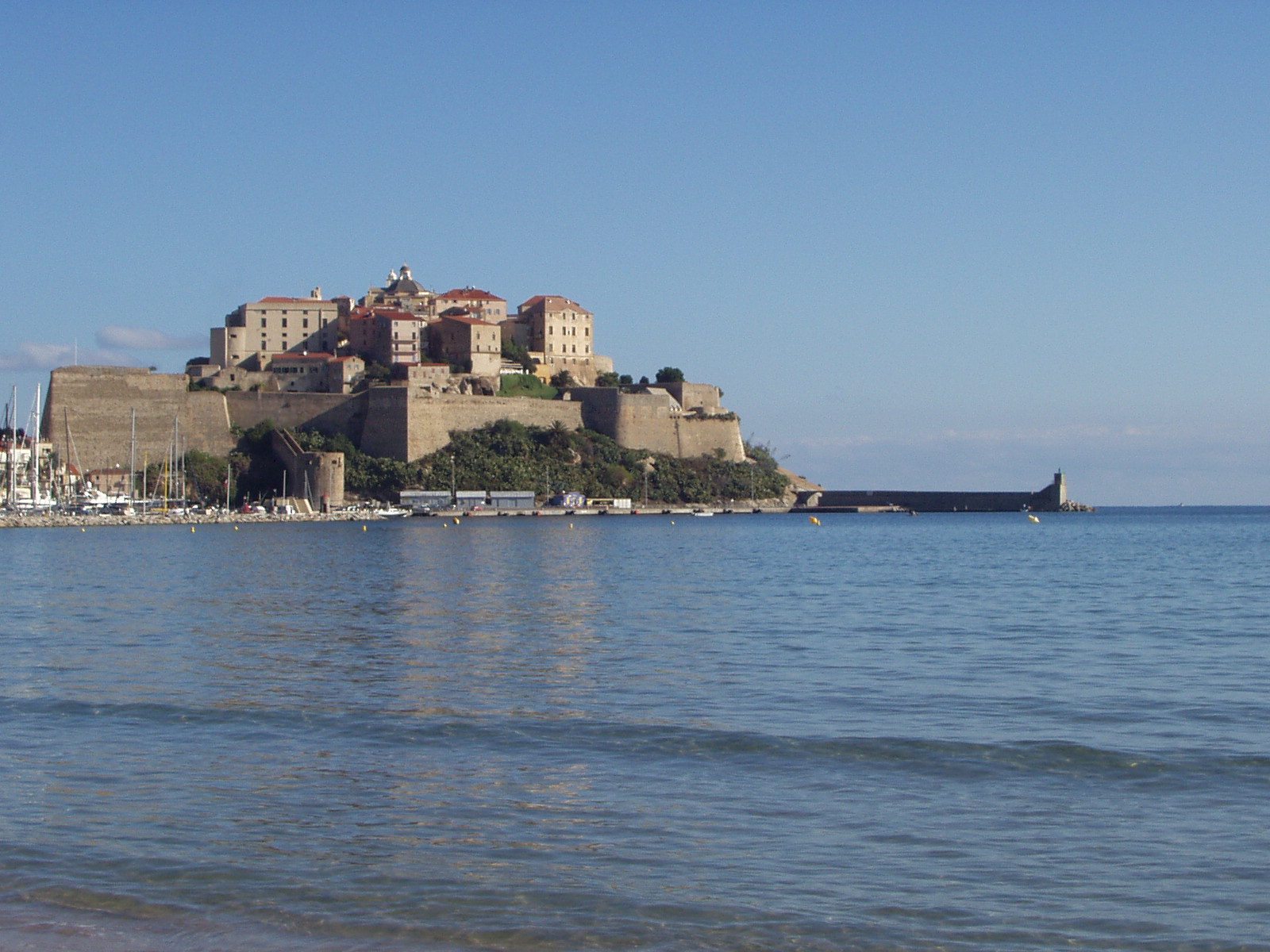
Modified medieval citadel at Calvi

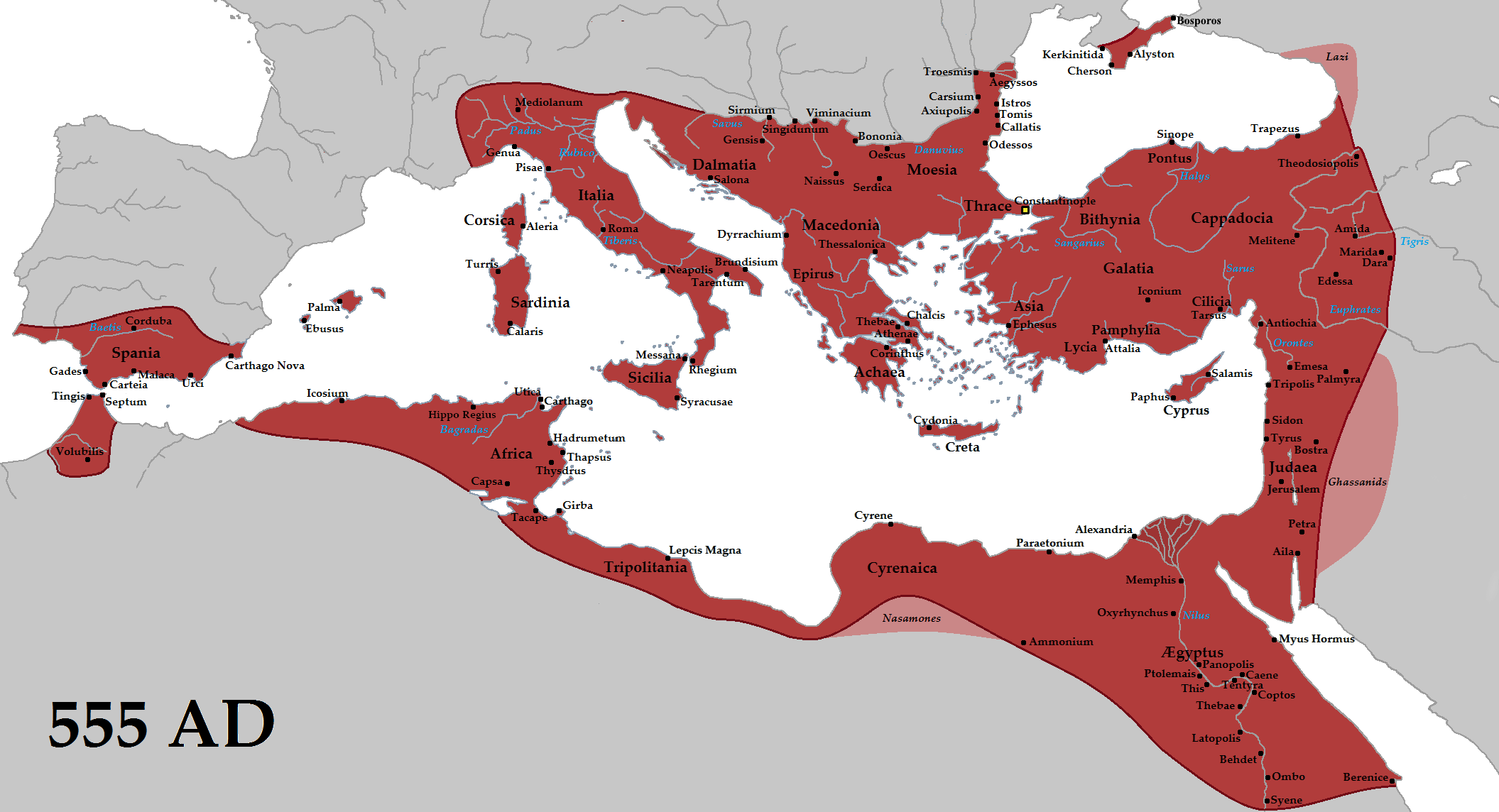
The Byzantine Empire in 555 AD, including Corsica

After the fall of the Western Roman Empire, Corsica was frequented by migrant peoples and corsairs, notably Vandals, who plundered and ravaged at will until the coastal settlements fell into decline and the population occupied the slopes of the mountains. Rampant malaria in the coastal marshes reinforced this decision. Due largely to competition for the island from Ostrogothic Foederati who had settled on the Riviera, the Vandals never penetrated much beyond the coast, and their stay in Corsica was relatively short-lived, just long enough to prejudice the Corsicans against foreign adventurers on Corsican soil.

750 AD

In 534, the armies of Justinian I recovered the island for the empire, but the Byzantines were not able to effectively defend the island from continuing raids by the Ostrogoths, the Lombards, and the Saracens. The Lombards, who had made themselves masters of the war- and famine-shattered Italian Peninsula, conquered the island in c. 725.

The Lombard supremacy on the island was short lived. In 774, the Frankish king Charlemagne conquered Corsica as he moved to subdue the Lombards and restore the Western Empire. For the next century and a half, the thus established Holy Roman Empire continually warred with the Saracens for control of the island. In 807, Charlemagne's constable Burchard defeated an invading force from Al Andalus. In c. 930, Berengar II, King of Italy, invaded and subdued the imperial forces. Otto I vanquished Berengar and restored Corsica to imperial control in 965.

Its external threats mostly vanquished, a period of feudal anarchy followed as local Corsican-based nobles warred on each other and struggled for control, culminating in the transfer of the island – at the request of its population – to the papacy in 1077. The Pope yielded civic administration to Pisa in 1090, but contention between the Pisans and their rival Genoese soon engulfed Corsica. Repeated truces proved fleeting as the two naval and trading powers clashed for supremacy in the Western Mediterranean. The various Italian republics that arose began to assume responsibility for the security and prosperity of Corsica, starting with Tuscany, the closest. Corsica was finally removed from the fighting by annexation to the Papal States in 1217.

== Late Middle Ages and Renaissance ==
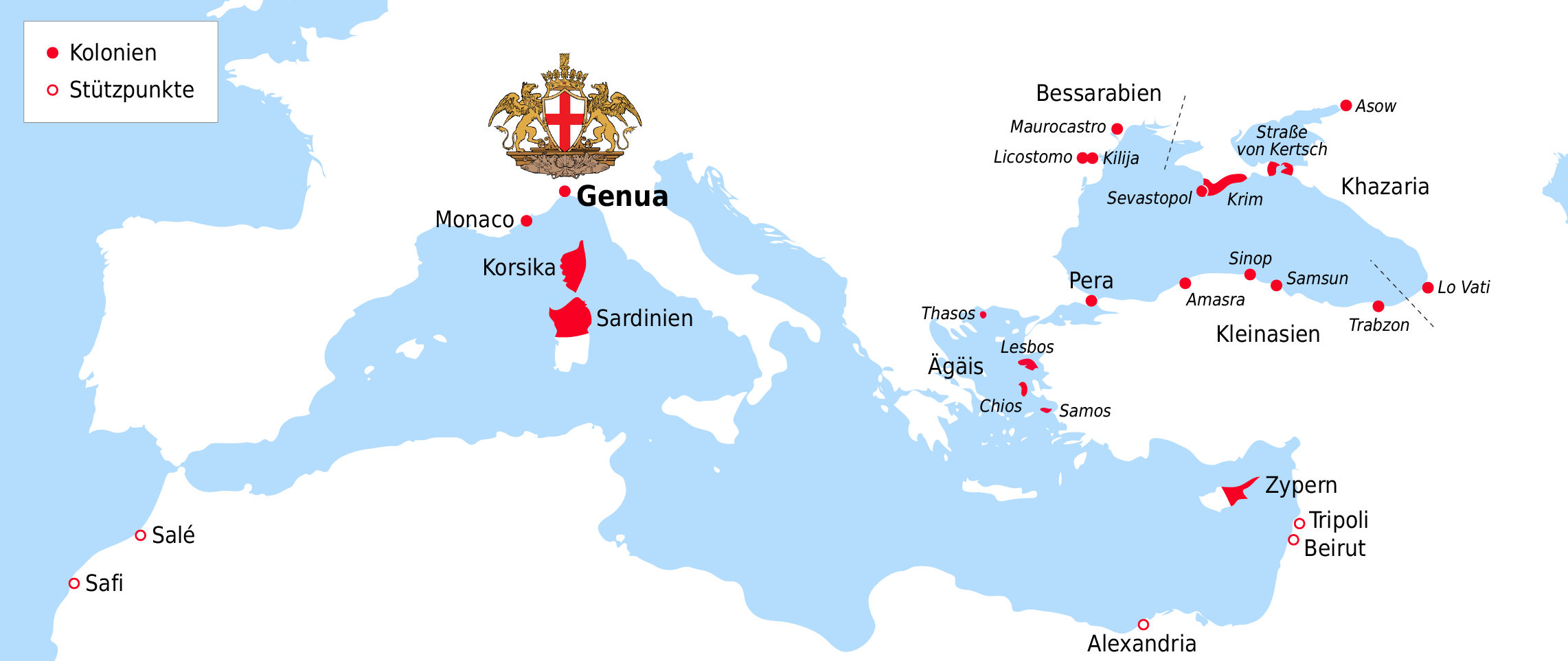
Territories of the Republic of Genoa (shown in red), 1400

Pisa retained control of the island during most of the Middle Ages but at the start of the Renaissance it fell to Genoa in 1284, following the battle of Meloria against Pisa.

Corsica successively was part of the Republic of Genoa for five centuries. Despite take-overs by Aragon between 1296 and 1434 and France between 1553 and 1559, Corsica would remain under Genoese control until the Corsican Republic of 1755 and under partial control until its purchase by France in 1768.

=== Bank of Saint George ===
However, the dissension and political conflict at home did not always permit Doges of Genoa to govern Corsica well or at all. During such periods the island was subject to destructive conflict between coalitions of signorial families. The Bank of Saint George became involved as a major creditor of the Republic of Genoa. As security for their public loans they had obtained a franchise to collect public money; i.e., taxes.

1494 AD

In 1453 the people of Corsica held a general assembly, or Diet, at Lago Benedetto at which they voted to request the protection of the Bank of Saint George as a credible third-party. In return the bank would get the right to exercise their franchise in Corsica. This third-party solution became immediately popular. The government of Genoa placed Corsica in the bank's hands and the major contenders on Corsica agreed to a peace, some accepting cash payments for their cooperation.

Throughout the next century the bank undertook enterprises in the major coastal cities, sending in troops to secure the strong points, building or rebuilding the citadels, recruiting several hundred colonists per city, mainly Genoese, and constructing quarters for them within a city wall. Most of these "old cities" survive and are populated today, having served as the nucleus of modern Corsican coastal cities.

The natives were at first kept at bay. Typically more or less immediately but certainly by a few generations they were allowed to conurbate with the Genoese, especially as the latter were decimated by malaria and required the assistance of the natives. Some conflict continued but within a few decades peace and order were restored to the island. Genoese watchtowers populated the entire coastline (and are there yet) where the forces of Genoese signori ruling from coastal castles kept a watchful eye for raiders, pirates, bandits and smugglers.

=== Sampiero Corso ===
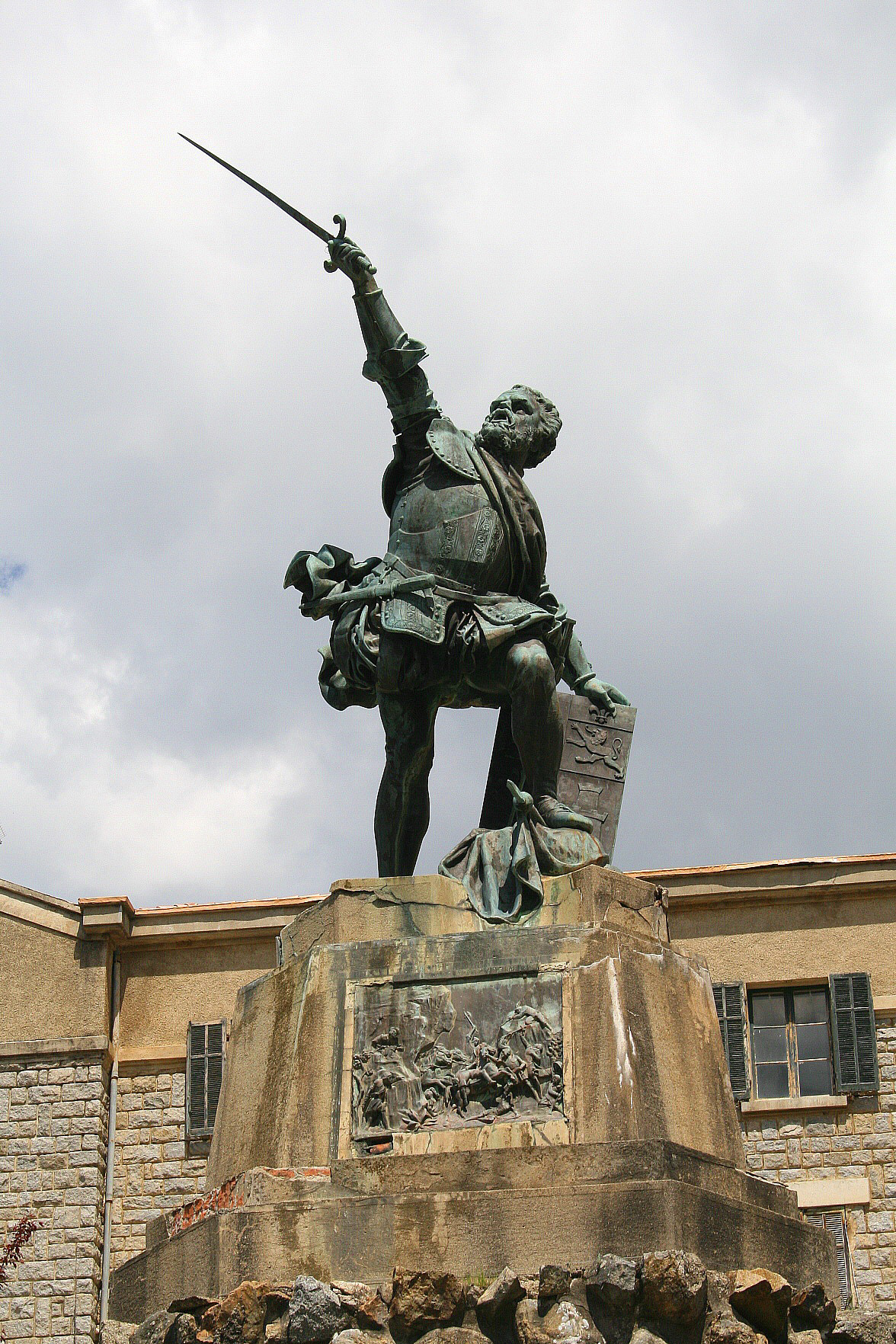
Monument to Sampiero Corso, Bastelica

Having begun its dominion in Corsica by building walled cities from which the Corsicans were to be excluded, the Bank of Saint George in the exercise of its taxation franchise finally became as unpopular in some quarters as the Republic of Genoa. It too generated a population of Corsican exiles, one of whom, Sampiero Corso, immigrated to France and became ultimately a high-ranking officer in the French army. He was thus on hand in Italy during the Italian War of 1551–1559 when the question came up in a conference of the general staff of what to do with Corsica, which was between France and Italy. At the insistence of Corso and other well-placed exiles the Marshal Paul de Termes gave orders, without the knowledge or assent of his commander, Henry II of France, to take Corsica.

In August 1553, the Turkish fleet under Dragut, an ally of the French under a Franco-Ottoman alliance, set sail transporting French troops to Cap Corse in the Invasion of Corsica (1553). Bastia fell on the 24th, Saint-Florent on the 26th, Corte shortly after and Bonifacio in September. Before they could take Calvi the Turks went home in October for unknown reasons. Sampiero Corso proceeded to raise civil war in central Corsica, pitting signor against signor, wasting the villages of his opponents.

That November, Henry II opened negotiations with Genoa but too late. While parlaying the Genoese sent their best commander, Admiral Andrea Doria, with 15,000 men to Cap Corse, recapturing Saint-Florent in February 1554. By 1555, the French had been cleared from most of the coastal cities and Doria left. A Turkish fleet sent to help was decimated by the plague and went home towing empty ships, assisted by Genoese gold. Sampiero fought on in the hinterland.

Peace was finally brokered by Elizabeth I of England. By the Treaty of Cateau-Cambrésis in 1559, the French returned Corsica to Genoa. Left without support, Corso went again into exile. Peace was restored, but not before the Genoese had dealt severely with the traitorous Signori.

== Enlightenment ==
Corsican society had always been relatively egalitarian, and writer Dorothy Carrington claims, "Alone among the peoples of Europe the Corsicans avoided feudal and capitalist oppression."

The Age of Enlightenment overthrew signorial and colonial rule and brought some measure of self-rule to the island. As the Corsican constitution was drawn up in 1755, Corsica is distinguished by having staged the first enlightenment revolution, being upstaged only by the English Revolution of the preceding century. It was the first of a trio: Corsican, American, French, and as such had some influence on the American Revolution. Corsica never did obtain total sovereignty but it shared in the French Revolution, became part of France, and acquired the local autonomy and civil rights established by that revolution.

Corsica 1700

Genoese rule in the 18th century was less than satisfactory to Corsicans, who considered it corrupt and ineffective. The Genoese on their part used their citadels and watch towers in an attempt to control a population that without its assent could not be controlled. The Corsicans had a bastion of their own, the mountains, but steadily the number of exiles abroad grew and those began to look for ways and means to free Corsica from all foreign powers. At no point in the Corsican history had the island ever been a nation of its own, nor did it ever achieve that goal. In the 18th century, however, Corsicans were able to establish a partial republic in which the Genoese were penned up in the citadels but ruled nowhere else. The republic began with a search by the exiles for a savior, a man of great ability who could step in and lead them to victory and self-rule.

=== Revolution of 1729–36 ===
In 1729, a full-scale revolt broke out in Corsica. In April 1731, having been unable to contain the outbreak, the Genoese appealed to the Emperor Charles VI, as feudal suzerain of the island, for military assistance. The moment was propitious, since the emperor was on good terms with the Duke of Savoy and the King of Spain, and had just signed agreement with the Maritime Powers. In July, 4,000 men of the garrison of Milan were sent to Corsica at the expense of Genoa. The Genoese desired to keep the expedition small and the cost low, but the military expert Eugene of Savoy convinced the emperor to increase the number of troops to 12,000 by 1732. The war degenerated into a guerrilla campaign in the mountains, which the professional forces of the emperor could not win.

After negotiations were opened, the Corsicans offered their island's sovereignty to Charles or, if he refused, Eugene. A final agreement was signed at Corte on 13 May 1732, whereby the Genoese would return to power and implement reforms. An amnesty was granted to all rebels and the emperor guaranteed the accord. The emperor was unable to prevent Genoa returning to its former mismanagement, and island rose up again in 1734.

In the second phase of the revolt, the Corsican leader, Giacinto Paoli, requested Spanish assistance. None arrived before the German adventurer Theodor von Neuhoff, who convinced the people to elect him King Theodore of Corsica in March 1736. He left in October 1736 to seek support abroad, and was arrested in Amsterdam and thrown in debtors' prison.

=== Corsican Republic ===
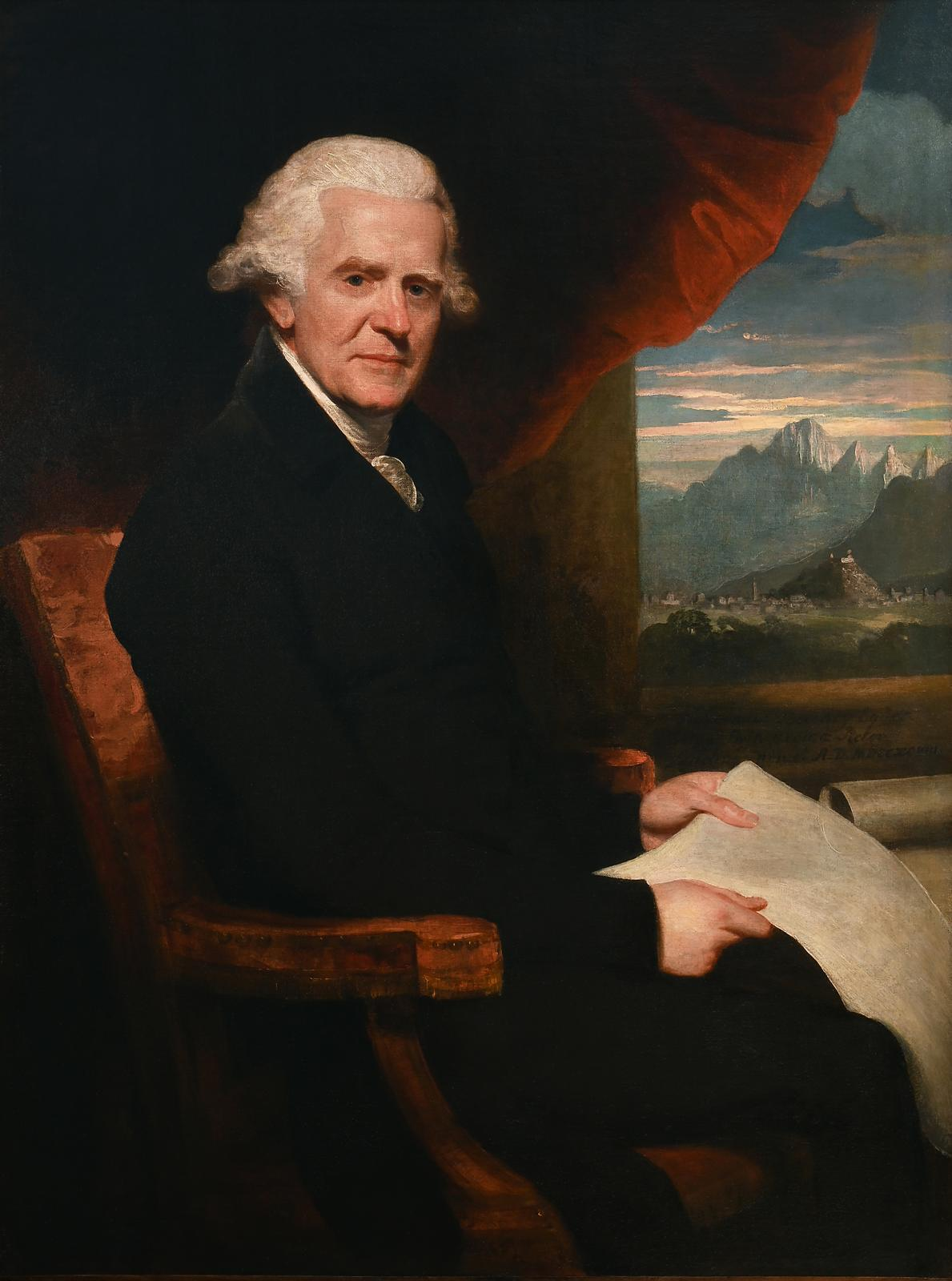
Pasquale Paoli, portrait by Sir William Beechey

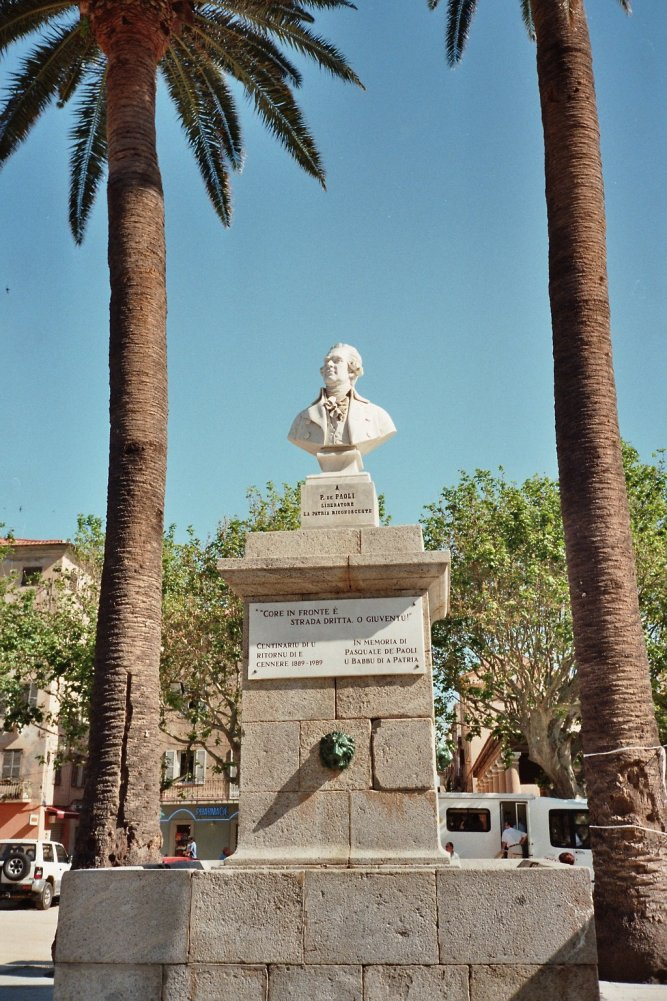
Monument to Pasquale Paoli

A capable advocate of Corsican independence at last stepped forward from the ranks of Corsicans in exile in Italy, Pasquale Paoli, a general and patriot who struggled against Genoa and then France, and became Il Babbu di a Patria (Father of the Nation). In 1755 he proclaimed the Corsican Republic. Paoli founded the first University of Corsica (with instruction in Italian). He chose the Moor's head ("Testa Mora"), previously used by Theodore of Corsica, as Corsica's emblem in 1760. Paoli considered the Corsicans to be an Italian people.

=== Sale and annexation to France ===
Seeing that attempts to dislodge Paoli were futile, in 1764 by secret treaty Genoa sold Corsica to the Duke of Choiseul, then minister of the French Navy, who bought it on behalf of the crown. On the quiet, French troops gradually replaced Genoese in the citadels. In 1768, after preparations had been made, an open treaty with Genoa ceded Corsica to France in perpetuity with no possibility of retraction and the Duke appointed a Corsican supporter, Buttafuoco, as administrator. The island rose in revolt. Paoli fought a guerrilla war against fresh French troops under their commander, Comte de Marbeuf, but was defeated in the Battle of Ponte Novu and had to go into exile in Vienna and then London. The French move into Corsica triggered the Corsican Crisis in Britain, where debate raged over the question of British intervention. In 1770, Marbeuf publicly announced the annexation of Corsica and appointed a governor.

=== Anglo-Corsican Kingdom ===
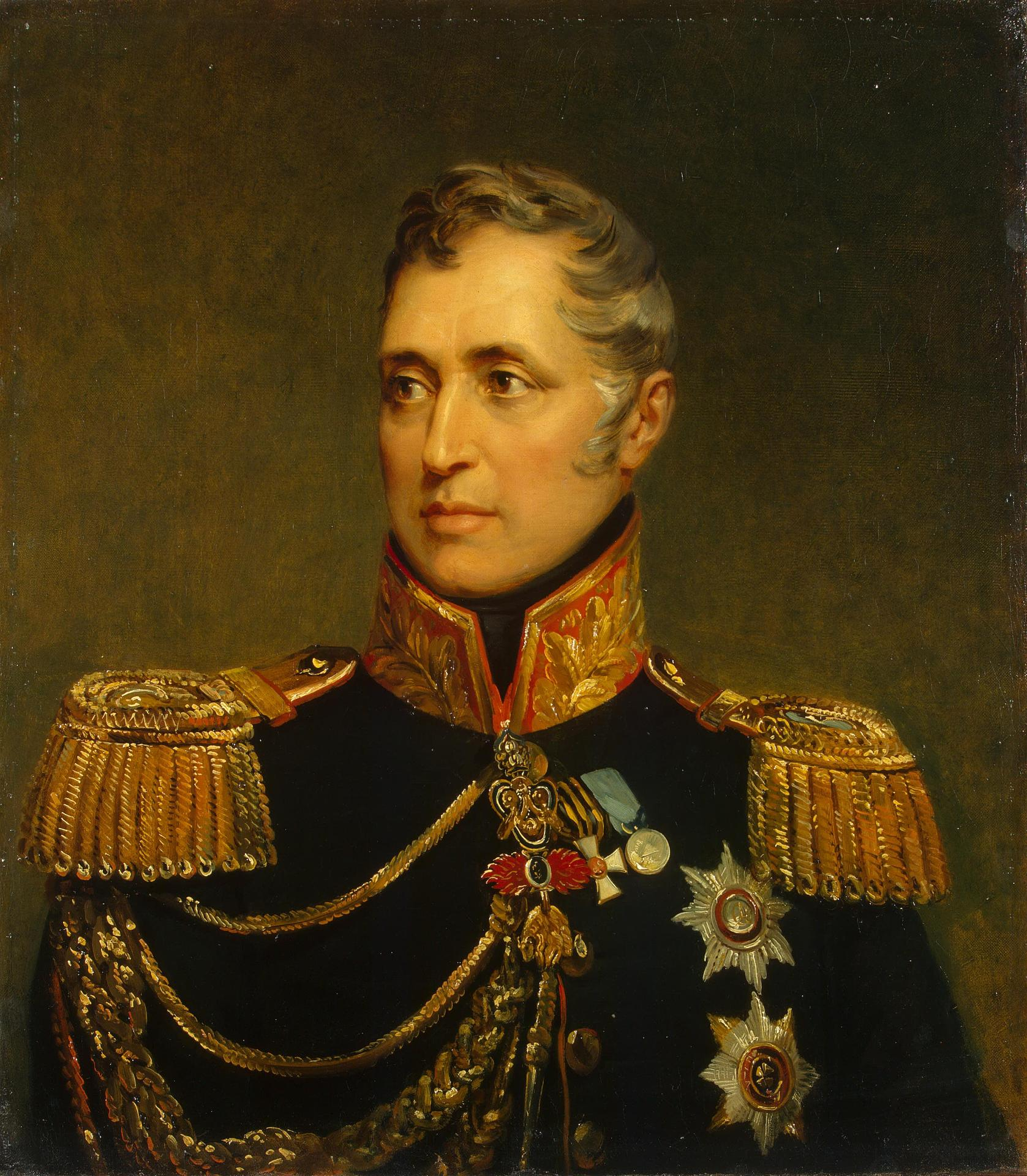
Carlo Andrea Pozzo di Borgo

After the French revolution, Corsican leader Pasquale Paoli, who had been exiled under the monarchy, became something of an idol of liberty and democracy. In 1789 he was invited to Paris by the National Constituent Assembly and was celebrated as a hero in front of the assembly. He was afterwards sent back to Corsica having been given the rank of lieutenant-general.

In 1795, after proclaiming the independence of Corsica, a constitution was adopted that made Corsica a kingdom in personal union with Great Britain, represented by a viceroy. The constitution was considered quite democratic for its time, with an elected Parliament and a Council. Sir Gilbert Elliot served as viceroy whereas Carlo Andrea Pozzo di Borgo served as head of government (effectively a prime minister). The island returned to French rule in 1796.

== Modern era ==
=== 19th century ===
From 1854 to 1857 the Société du Télégraphe Électrique or "The Mediterranean Electric Telegraph", a company started by John Watkins Brett, connected La Spezia, Italy with Corsica by submarine cable, being the first to do so. The line ran south along the east coast, partly on land, partly on sea, from Cap Corse to Ajaccio, where a second cable crossed the Strait of Bonifacio. Brett's intended links across Sardinia and through the deeps to Bona, Algeria, failed because of decimation of the crews by malaria and the technical difficulties of laying cable in deep waters. By 1870 Paris could communicate with Algeria by telegraph through Corsica.

=== First World War and after ===
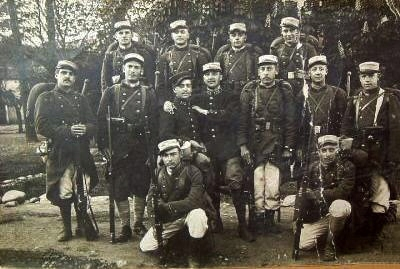
Corsican troops of 1916, from a postcard

In World War I Corsica responded to the call to arms more intensely than any other allied region. Out of a population estimated by a diplomat of the times to have been about 300,000, some 50,000 Corsican men were under arms: a ratio greater than one of every six Corsican citizens.

The civilian population was correspondingly pro-allied. Prisoners of war were sent to Corsica. There they occupied every available space from rooms in monasteries to cells in citadels. Stone sheds were converted for their use. When all else failed, wooden barracks were constructed on the mountainsides. The prisoners were put to work in agriculture and forestry. Corsica was also turned into a hospital for the wounded. Most of the allies sent medical units or volunteers. The island was so useful as a base that the sea lanes leading to it were under constant surveillance and attack by U-boats.

Corsican poilus fought loyally and with valor. Estimates of casualties vary but most are over 50%. As a result, the survivors became established in the upper echelons of the French military and police. However, the loss of manpower contributed to a recession and mass exodus from Corsica in favor of southern France in the post-war period. Corsicans of means became colonizers during this period, the descendants of the former signori starting agricultural enterprises in Vietnam, Algeria and Puerto Rico. It was on them that the blow of subsequent wars of independence fell most heavily.

=== Second World War ===
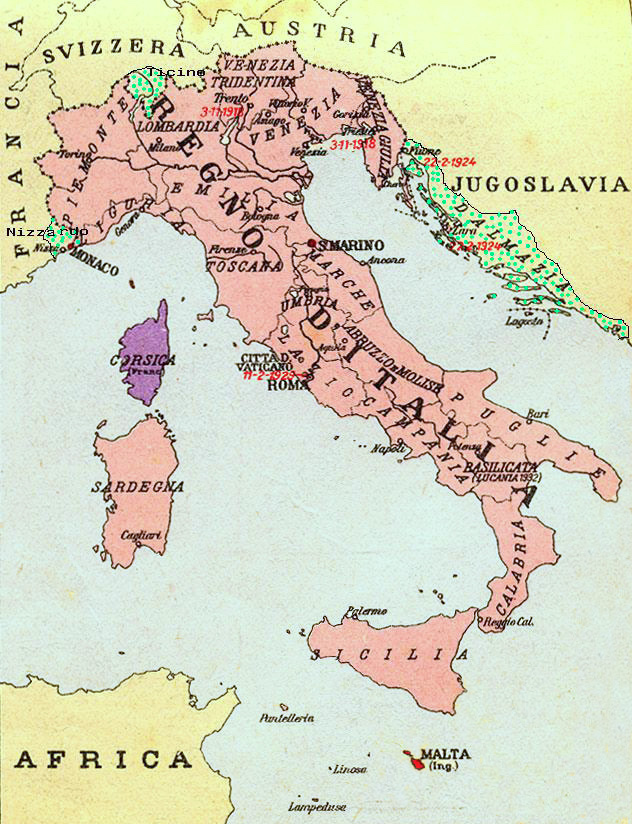
Italian ethnic regions claimed in the 1930s by the Italian irredentism: * Green: Nice, Ticino and Dalmatia * Red: Malta * Violet: Corsica * Savoy and Corfu were later claimed

After the Allied defeat of 1940, Corsica became part of the Southern zone of Vichy France, and was thus not directly occupied by Axis forces, but fell under ultimate military control of Nazi Germany. A campaign of rhetoric by Benito Mussolini asserting that Corsica belonged to Italy was reinforced by the irredentist movement of Italian-speaking Corsicans (such as Petru Giovacchini) who advocated the unification of the island with Italy.

In November 1942, as part of its invasion of the southern zone, Germany arranged for fascist Italy to occupy Corsica as well as some parts of France up to the Rhône river. The Italian occupation force in Corsica grew to over 85,000 troops, later reinforced by 12,000 German troops. The French had no troops with which to prevent the occupation. Irredentist propaganda intensified, but the préfet representing the French government restated French sovereignty over the island and stated that the Italian troops were occupiers.

The French Resistance soon began developing under the impetus of loyal local inhabitants (the Maquis named after the 18th-century partisans of Pasquale Paoli), and of Free French leaders starting in December 1942, with Charles de Gaulle eventually sending Paulin Colonna d'Istria from Algeria to unite the movements. Boosted via six visits by the Free French submarine Casabianca, and further armed by Allied airdrops, the strengthened Resistance was met with fierce repression by the OVRA (Italian fascist police) and the fascist Black Shirts paramilitary groups but gained strength, especially in the countryside.

In July 1943, following the Fall of the Fascist regime in Italy, 12,000 German troops came to Corsica. They formally took over the occupation on 9 September 1943, the day after the Armistice of Cassibile. Following the Allied landings in Sicily and the Italian surrender, these German troops were joined by the remnants of the Africa Division of the German army, reconstituted as the 90th Panzergrenadier Division with about 40,000 men, which crossed over from Sardinia. They were accompanied by some Italian Social Republic forces. They faced Resistance forces which had been asked to occupy the mountains to prevent Axis troop movements between the Corsican coasts, as well as a subset of Royal Italian Army troops that allied with them but whose contribution was hampered as their leadership was ambivalent. The German forces retreated from Bonifacio towards the Northern harbor of Bastia. Elements of the reconstituted French I Corps, from the 4th Moroccan Mountain Division, landed in Ajaccio to counter the German movement and the Germans evacuated Bastia by 4 October 1943, leaving behind 700 dead and 350 POWs.

After Corsica was thus liberated from the forces of the Third Reich, the island started functioning as an Allied air base in support of the Mediterranean Theater of Operations in 1944; in particular, groups of the 57th Bomb Wing were stationed along the east coast from Bastia in the north to Solenzara in the south. Corsica was also one of the bases from which Operation Dragoon, the invasion of southern France in August 1944, was launched.

While on the island, U.S. Army engineers successfully eradicated the malaria that had been endemic to the coastal areas of Corsica, including half the island's arable land that had been previously uninhabitable.

=== Modern era ===
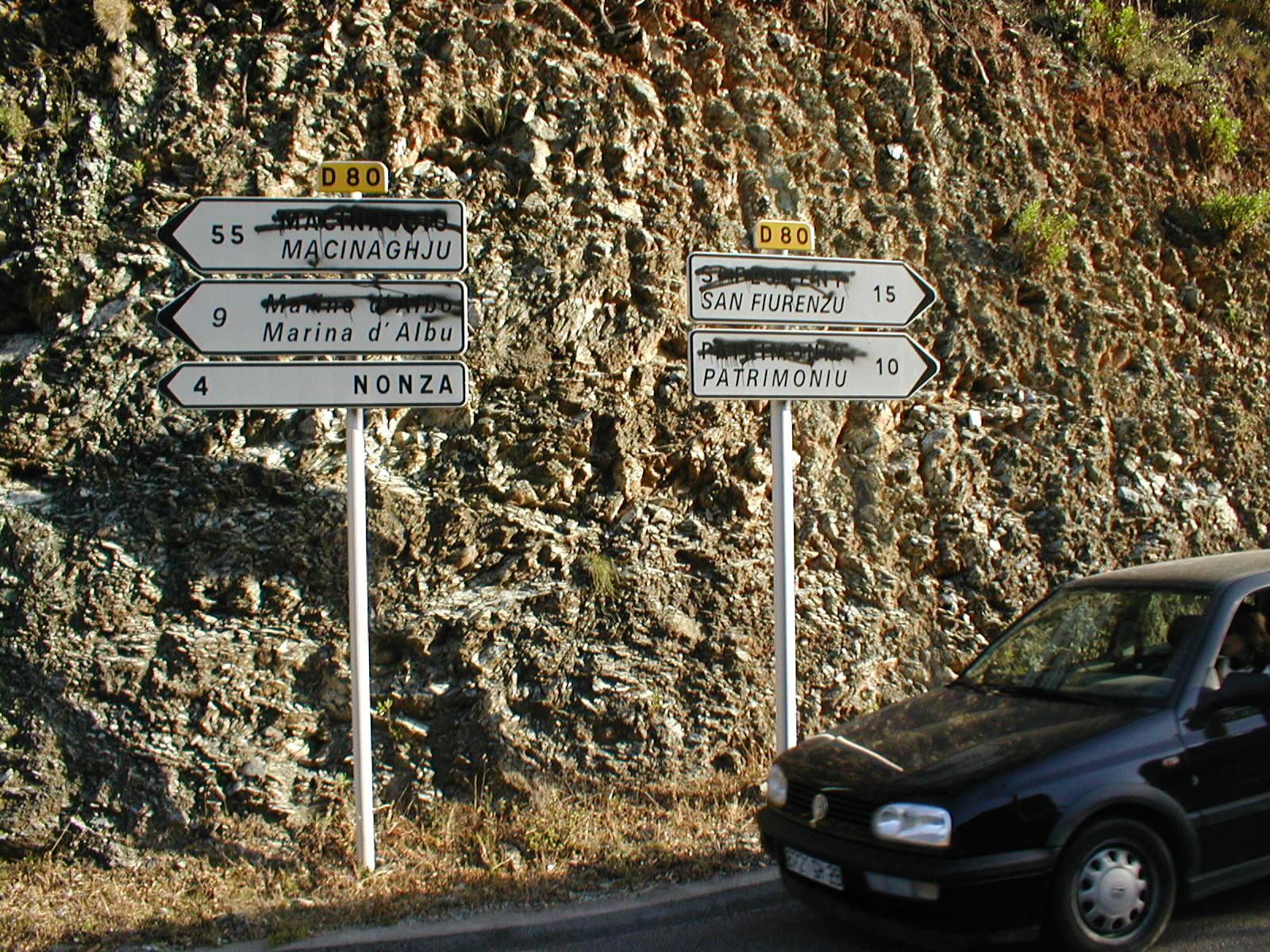
Corsican nationalists have taken up means such as vandalizing the French language on road signs.

In recent decades, Corsica has developed a thriving tourism industry, which has attracted a sizeable number of immigrants to the island in search of employment. Various movements, calling for either greater autonomy or complete independence from France, have been launched, some of whom have at times used violent means, like the National Front for the Liberation of Corsica (FLNC). In May 2001, the French government granted the island of Corsica limited autonomy, launching a process of devolution in an attempt to end the push for nationalism.

Corsica served as the start of the 2013 Tour de France, the first time that the event was staged on the island.

In January 2025, the Assembly created an information mission on the institutional future of Corsica. The information mission could give way to a real legislative power if, after 5 years, the adaptation status proves to be insufficient.

== Bibliography ==
- Aldrich. Robert. "France's Colonial Island: Corsica and the Empire" French History & Civilization (2009), Vol. 3, p112-125.
- "Corsica", Italy (2nd ed.), Coblenz: Karl Baedeker, 1870, OL 24140254M
- Candea, Matei. Corsican fragments: difference, knowledge, and fieldwork (Indiana UP, 2010).
- Carrington, Dorothy. Granite Island: A Portrait of Corsica (London, 1971).
- Gregory, Desmond. Ungovernable Rock: A History of the Anglo-Corsican Kingdom & Its Role in Britain's Mediterranean Strategy during the Revolutionary War (1793-1797) (1986) 211pp.
- Hall, Thadd E. "Thought and practice of enlightened government in French Corsica." American Historical Review 74.3 (1969): 880–905. online
- McLaren, Moray. "Pasquale Paoli: Hero of Corsica." History Today (Nov 1965) 15#11 pp 756–761.
- Meeks, Joshua. "Revolutionary Corsica, 1789–1793." in France, Britain, and the Struggle for the Revolutionary Western Mediterranean (Palgrave Macmillan, Cham, 2017) pp. 41–73.
- Nicholas, Nick. "A history of the Greek colony of corsica." Journal of the Greek Diaspora 31 (2005): 33–78. covers 1600 to 1799. online
- Playfair, R. Lambert (1892), "Corsica", Handbook to the Mediterranean (3rd ed.), London: J. Murray, OL 16538259M
- Savigear, Peter. "Intervention and the Balance of Power: An Eighteenth Century War of Liberation" Studies in History & Politics (1981) 2#2 pp 113–126, on Pasquale Paoli in 1768
- Varley, Karine. "Between Vichy France and fascist Italy: Redefining identity and the enemy in Corsica during the Second World War." Journal of Contemporary History 47.3 (2012): 505-527 online.
- Willis, F. Roy. "Development planning in eighteenth-century France: Corsica's Plan Terrier." French Historical Studies 11.3 (1980): 328–351. online
- Wilson, Stephen. Feuding, Conflict and Banditry in Nineteenth-Century Corsica (1988). 565pp.

=== French works ===
- Antonetti, Pierre (1973). Histoire de la Corse. Paris: R. Laffont..
- Costa, Laurent-Jacques (2004). Corse préhistorique: peuplement d'une île et modes de vie des sociétés insulaires, IXe-IIe millénaires av. J.-C. Paris: Errance. ISBN 2-87772-273-2..
- Costa, Laurent-Jacques (2006). Questions d'économie préhistorique. Modes de vie et échange en corse et en Sardaigne. Ajaccio: Éditions du CRDP..
- De Cursay, Marc (2008). Corse : la fin des mythes. Paris: Éditions Lharmattan..
- Mérimée, Prosper. Colomba: histoire d'une jeune corse qui pousse son frère à venger la mort de son père..
- Renucci, Janine (2001). La Corse. Paris: Presses universitaires de France. ISBN 2-13-037169-8..
- Vergé-Franceschi, Michel (1996). Histoire de la Corse. Paris: Éditions du Félin. ISBN 2-86645-221-6. 2 volumes..
