= Battle of Borgo =

1768 battle

- Part of the French conquest of Corsica
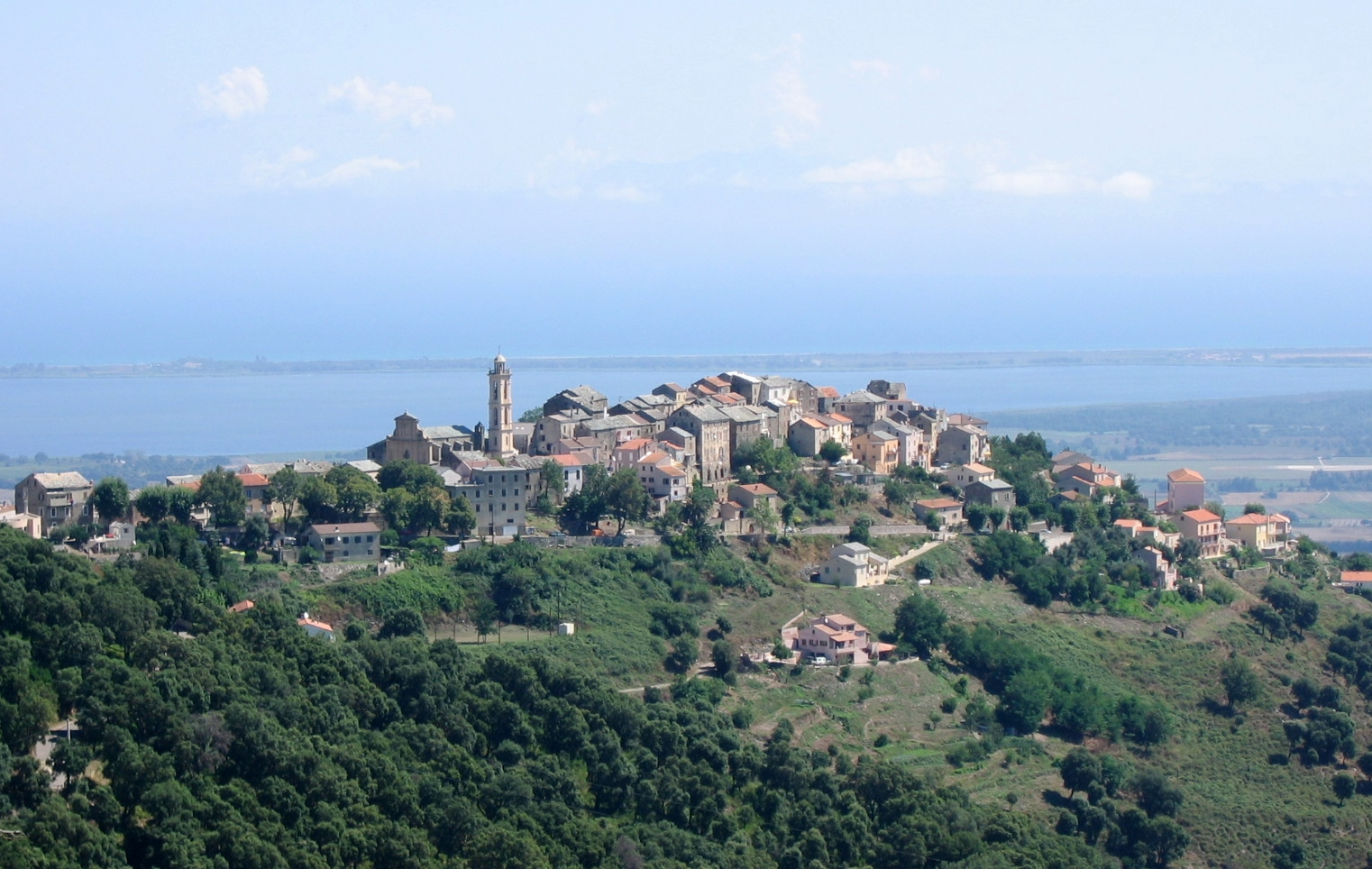
- The town of Borgo where the battle took place
| Date | October 8, 1768 |
| Location | Borgo, Corsica 42°33′17″N 9°25′41″E |
| Result | Corsican victory |

Belligerents
| Corsican Republic | France |

Commanders and leaders
| Pasquale Paoli | Charles Marbeuf |

Strength
| 4,000 men | 3,700 men |

Casualties and losses
| Unknown | Total: 2,200; 600 killed 1,000 wounded 600 captured |

The Battle of Borgo was a military engagement fought between the forces of Corsica and France forces over control of the town of Borgo, during the French conquest of Corsica.

== Prelude ==
In October 1768, Pasquale Paoli tried to recapture U Borgu (Borgo), where a French force of 700 men under Colonel de Ludre was entrenched awaiting reinforcements. During this time. Pasquale Paoli ordered his entire force to march on Borgo, whilst Clément Paoli kept a watch on Pascal's rear to prevent Le Roy de Grandmaison from descending from Oletta, where he had taken refuge. The main roads between Bastia and Borgo were also kept under surveillance by the Corsicans. The Marquis de Chauvelin learned of the fate awaiting his countrymen and sent de Grandmaison towards Borgo. De Marbeuf and Chauvelin left Bastia with 3,000 men to join the force in Borgo. De Ludre and his 700 men entrenched themselves in Borgo awaiting the assault. Paoli inspired his troops by telling them "Patriots, recall the Corsican Vespers, when on this very spot you destroyed the French. The honour of the fatherland and public liberty today need all your valour. Europe is watching you."

== Course ==
Battle commenced on the morning of 8 October 1768 and lasted ten hours. De Grandmaison tried in vain to defeat Clément Paoli and his men. Marbeuf and Chauvelin thought it best to retreat and de Ludre surrendered. 600 were dead, 1000 wounded and 600 taken prisoner, whilst 3 bronze cannon, 6 other cannon, a mortar, 1,700 fusils and other munitions were captured by the Corsicans. King Louis XV of France was surprised by the defeat and even thought of making no further armed attempts to incorporate Corsica into France, but the Duc De Choiseul made every effort to continue the war and repair the damage the defeat had done to his reputation.

== Culture ==
The Corsican Nationalist song "Borgu" celebrates this victory. The tune of "White Army, Black Baron" is taken for this song.
