= French conquest of Corsica =

French expedition

French conquest over Corsica
- Part of the Corsican War of Independence
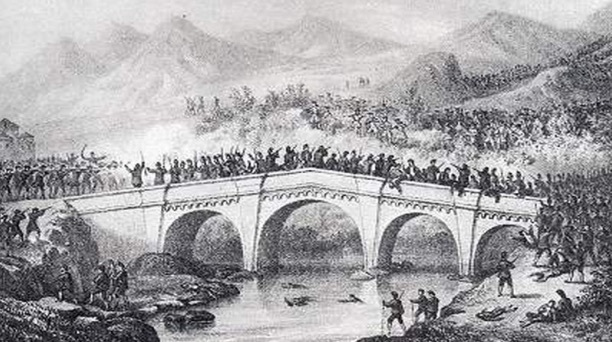
- A depiction of the battle of Ponte Novu
Date	15 May 1768 – 9 May 1769
Location	Corsica
Result	French victory
Territorial changes	Corsica annexed by the Kingdom of France

Belligerents
France	Corsican Republic

Commanders and leaders
Noël Jourda; Charles Marbeuf	Pasquale Paoli; Carlo Salicetti

Strength
24,000	~15,000

Casualties and losses
+2,200 casualties	Unknown

The French conquest of Corsica was a successful expedition by French forces of the Kingdom of France under the Comte de Vaux, against Corsican forces under Pasquale Paoli of the Corsican Republic. The expedition was launched in May 1768, in the aftermath of the Seven Years' War. A French expeditionary force was landed on the island of Corsica, then ruled by the Corsican Republic. Marching inland to overcome any Corsican opposition, the French force initially suffered an unexpected defeat at the Battle of Borgo. But a new commander, the Comte de Vaux, was appointed to lead the expedition, and decisively defeated the Corsican army at the Battle of Ponte Novu in 1769, effectively bringing an end to Corsican resistance.

The Corsican forces, having neither the willpower nor the manpower to resist the French, surrendered the island. After the Corsican defeat, France annexed the island, although they took a year consolidating the territory as many Corsicans took to the hills and engaged in guerrilla warfare against the French. Pasquale Paoli fled to Great Britain, where he was immensely popular, and became a member of Samuel Johnson's dining club. Corsica remained under French rule until 1794, when an Anglo-Corsican expedition captured Corsica from the French and the Anglo-Corsican Kingdom was established, with Paoli as its ruler. On 19 October 1796, the French reconquered Corsica and it became a French département.

== Background ==
The island of Corsica had been ruled by the Republic of Genoa since 1284. In the 18th century, Corsicans started to develop their own nationalism and seek their independence from Genoese rule. In 1729, the Corsican Revolution for independence from Genoa began, first led by Luiggi Giafferi and Giacinto Paoli, and later by Paoli's son, Pasquale Paoli. After 26 years of struggle against the Republic of Genoa (plus an ephemeral attempt to proclaim in 1736 an independent Kingdom of Corsica under the German adventurer Theodor von Neuhoff, who was supported by the Dutch Republic and the Kingdom of Great Britain, which at the time ruled over Menorca and Gibraltar in the Mediterranean Sea), the independent Corsican Republic was proclaimed in 1755 under the leadership of Pasquale Paoli and remained sovereign until 1769.

The 1755 Corsican Constitution was written in Italian (the language of culture in Corsica until the middle of the 19th century) by Paoli. Despite four decades of intense fighting, the Corsican Republic proved unable to eject the Genoese from the major coastal fortresses of Calvi and Bonifacio.

After the Corsican conquest of Capraia, a small island of the Tuscan Archipelago, in 1767, the Republic of Genoa, exhausted by forty years of fighting, decided to sell the island to France which, after its defeat in the Seven Years' War, was trying to reinforce its position in the Mediterranean. In 1768, with the Treaty of Versailles (1768), the Genoese republic ceded all its rights on the island. The very same year, King Louis XV sent a military expedition to Corsica to secure French rule over the island, under the command of Comte de Vaux, a veteran of the Seven Years' War.

== Conquest ==
France's first offensive failed after the initial and rather small French expeditionary force suffered a significant setback at the Battle of Borgo in October 1768. France therefore dispatched large numbers of reinforcements, swelling the size of their army on the island to 24,000 men, and tasked a new commander with the renewal of the endeavor. The Corsican army was decisively defeated at the Battle of Ponte Novu and the French forces soon overran the island although Corsican forces were not ever subdued until the following year and sporadic outbreaks of rebellion continued. French control was consolidated over the island, and in 1770 it became a province of France. Under France, the use of Corsican (a regional language closely related to Italian) has gradually declined in favour of the standard French language. Italian was the official language of Corsica until 1859.

== Consequences ==
The French invasion triggered the Corsican Crisis in British politics. Although they sent secret aid to the Corsicans, the British government chose not to act to prevent the island's occupation. Paoli created a liberal Corsican Constitution heavily influenced by ideas underpinning the emerging, and famously unwritten, British Constitution. He created the most extensive voting franchise in the world, and attempted radical reforms in education. Because of Britain's enmity of France, and because the British had historically been supportive of Corsican exiles – Paoli sought to establish an alliance with Great Britain. Britain opened a consulate on the island, but events in Corsica did not feature prominently in Britain until 1768. The leader of the Corsican Republic, Pasquale Paoli, went into exile in Britain where he remained until the French Revolution allowed him to return to Corsica. British troops subsequently intervened in Corsica between 1794 and 1796, where they created the Anglo-Corsican Kingdom, and in 1814 when they agreed the Treaty of Bastia. Following the Congress of Vienna control of the islands were returned to the restored French monarchs.

The invasion and occupation had even more profound consequences for France itself. When Napoleon Bonaparte was born on Corsica in 1769, he automatically became a natural-born French citizen. Both his parents Carlo Maria Buonaparte and Maria Letizia Ramolino joined the local resistance and fought against the French to maintain independence, even when Maria was pregnant with him. Although raised as a Corsican nationalist, Napoleon gradually turned his loyalties towards the whole of France, serving in the French Army. He went on to become ruler of mainland France, adopted the ideals of the French Revolution as his own, and triggered the Napoleonic Wars that devastated much of Europe and changed it permanently.

== Legacy ==
To this day, some Corsican nationalists advocate the restoration of the island's republic. There are several groups and two nationalist parties (the autonomist Femu a Corsica and the separatist Corsica Libera) active on the island calling for some degree of Corsican autonomy from France or even full independence. Some groups that claim to support Corsican independence, such as the National Liberation Front of Corsica, have carried out an ongoing violent campaign since the 1970s that includes bombings and assassinations, usually targeting buildings and officials representing the French government.

== See also ==
- Treaty of Bastia
- Corsican nationalism
- Pasquale Paoli
- Comte de Vaux
- National Liberation Front of Corsica
- Corsican Crisis
- Anglo-Corsican Kingdom

== Bibliography ==
- Black, Jeremy. European Warfare, 1660–1815. UCL Press, 1994.
- Englund, Steven. Napoleon: A Political Life. Harvard University Press, 2005.
- Gregory, Desmond. The Ungovernable Rock: The Anglo-Corsican Kingdom. Associated University Press, 1985.
