= Bernard-François, marquis de Chauvelin =

French nobleman, diplomat and politician

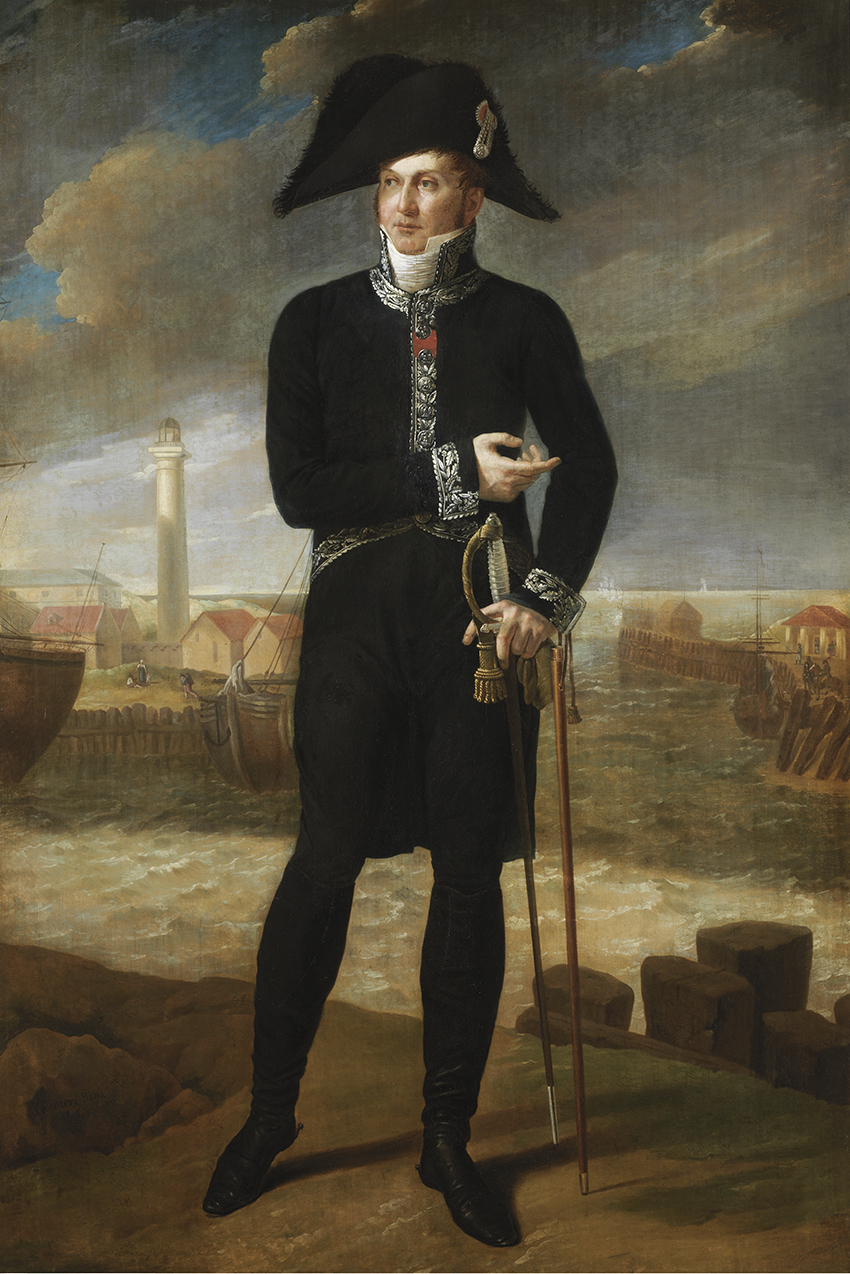
Portrait of the marquess Bernard-François de Chauvelin, 1805, by Joseph Denis Odevaere, collection Groeningemuseum

François-Bernard de Chauvelin, marquis de Grosbois (born 29 November 1766 in Paris; died 9 April 1832 in Paris), also known as Marquis de Chauvelin, was a French nobleman, diplomat, parliamentarian and liberal reformer.

== Biography ==
The scion of an illustrious family, Chauvelin followed his father François-Claude de Chauvelin as Master of the King's Wardrobe (to Louis XVI) and fought in the Comte de Rochambeau's French Expeditionary Force. However, despite being of aristocratic birth, he had been raised with liberal views and thus became supportive of the French Revolution.

In February 1792 he married Herminie-Felicienne-Joséphine Tavernier de Boulogne de Magnanville and was posted to the Court of St. James's, styled "Ambassador's Cloak" (or Deputy Ambassador), under Talleyrand. His role in London was to persuade the British Government to remain neutral in the impending war between France and Austria and Prussia. Arriving in May 1792, Chauvelin was well received at first and secured British neutrality. However, on 10 August 1792, in light of the storming of the Tuileries and the formal suspension of King Louis XVI from power, Chauvelin's status became ambiguous - as his credentials had been issued by a non-ruling king and, moreover, Britain had recalled its own ambassador (and not replaced him), thereby ending official communication. Following the formation of the French Republic in September, the new French republican government did not promptly renew his credentials, ending what remained of his official status at the Court of St James. Despite Chauvelin's claims to continue as interim representative of France until the arrival of his new credentials (he believed them imminent), foreign secretary William Grenville refused to recognize him as officially speaking for the French republic and returned his papers and missives. Chauvelin finally received his new credentials from the French republic in January 1793 and requested an audience with the British king to present them. But the timing was inauspicious - Louis XVI had been sentenced to death by the French convention the day before, and would be executed a few days later (21 January). Chauvelin was ordered to leave England by 1 February 1793, as the British made preparations for war.

After returning to Paris and ingratiating himself with the new régime, Chauvelin was posted as French Ambassador to Florence but his term there was unsuccessful, being unable to convince the Grand-Duke to recognize the new French Republic. Chauvelin was recalled to Paris and jailed as a suspect during the Terreur. However, he was released following Robespierre's arrest during the Thermidorean Reaction (27 July 1794).

In 1800, he was elected to the Tribunat and in February 1804, he was appointed Prefect of La Lys. And in 1811, Chauvelin was created a Baron of the Empire and appointed Councillor of State. From 1812 to 1814, he governed Catalonia – styled Intendant-Général – having been expected to win over the Catalans to Joseph Bonaparte, Emperor Napoleon's brother, who had been installed as King of Spain.

In 1816, he was elected to the Chamber of Deputies, and spoke in favor of press freedom and extending the electoral franchise. He earned a reputation as an outstanding orator. He was one of the major figures of the left-wing, republican and liberal group in parliament. Though he was returned again as a Deputy in 1827, he played no further part in public affairs, finally resigning in 1829. He then permanently withdrew to the former Abbey of Cîteaux in Beaune, which he had bought and converted into a residence. He died of cholera three years later in Paris.

== Chauvelin and The Scarlet Pimpernel ==
In Baroness Emmuska Orczy’s novel The Scarlet Pimpernel and its sequels, the Scarlet Pimpernel's arch enemy throughout most of the series is Citizen Chauvelin, a character loosely based on the real Marquis. Although there are some similarities between the real and fictional Chauvelins, Orczy's depiction of Chauvelin's career, personality and history is highly distorted.

== See also ==
- List of Ambassadors of France to the United Kingdom
