= Lys (department) =

Former French department (1795–1814)

Department of Lys Département de la Lys (French) Departement Leie (Dutch)
- 1795–1814
- Location of Lys in France (1812)
- Status: Department of the French First Republic and French First Empire
- Chef-lieu: Bruges; 51°12′N 3°13′E
- Official languages: French
- Common languages: Dutch
- History
  - Creation: 1 October 1795
  - Treaty of Paris, disestablished: 30 May 1814

Population
  - 1784: 444,260
  - 1804: 461,659
  - 1805: 471,689
  - 1812: 491,143
Preceded by	Succeeded by
County of Flanders	West Flanders
- Today part of: Belgium

Lys (French: [lis], Dutch: Leie) was a department of the French First Republic and French First Empire in present-day Belgium. It was named after the river Lys (Leie). It was created on 1 October 1795, when the Austrian Netherlands and the Prince-Bishopric of Liège were officially annexed by the French Republic. Prior to this annexation, its territory was part of the County of Flanders. Its Chef-lieu was Bruges.

Lys within the northern French Empire (1811)

The department was subdivided into the following four arrondissements and cantons (as of 1812):

- Bruges: Ardoye, Bruges (5 cantons), Ghistelles, Ostende, Ruysselede, Thielt and Thourout (2 cantons).
- Courtray: Avelghem, Courtray (4 cantons), Haerelbeke, Ingelmunster, Menin, Meulebeke, Moozeele, Oost-roosebeke and Roulers.
- Furnes: Dixmude, Furnes, Haeringhe and Nieuport.
- Ypres: Elverdinge, Hooglede, Messines, Pashendaele, Poperinghe, Wervicq and Ypres (2 cantons).

After Napoleon was defeated in 1814, the department became part of the United Kingdom of the Netherlands. Its territory corresponded perfectly with the present-day Belgian province of West Flanders.

== Administration ==
=== Prefects ===
The Prefect was the highest state representative in the department.

Term start	Term end	Office holder
2 March 1800	9 February 1804	François Marie Joseph Justin de Viry
9 February 1804	12 May 1808	François Bernard de Chauvelin
30 November 1810	25 August 1811	Pierre Amédée Vincent Joseph Marie Arborio-Biamino
25 August 1811	30 May 1814	Jean François Soult

=== General Secretaries ===
The General Secretary was the deputy to the Prefect.

Term start	Term end	Office holder
2 March 1800	30 May 1814	Auguste Henissart

=== Subprefects of Bruges ===
Until 1811, the Prefect also held the office of Subprefect of Bruges.

Term start	Term end	Office holder
14 January 1811	30 May 1814	Delanghe

=== Subprefects of Courtray ===
Term start	Term end	Office holder
25 April 1800	3 May 1801	Jean Baptiste De Burck
3 May 1801	3 May 1802	Constant
3 May 1802	30 May 1814	Antoine Alexis Joseph Picquet

=== Subprefects of Furnes ===
Term start	Term end	Office holder
25 April 1800	1 September 1801	Van den Bussche
1 September 1801	3 May 1802	Antoine Alexis Joseph Picquet
3 May 1802	25 March 1807	Philippe Jacques Herwyn
25 March 1807	21 September 1808	Nicolas Charles Joseph Dubois
21 September 1808	8 April 1813	Delaëter
8 April 1813	30 May 1814	F. Heim

=== Subprefects of Ypres ===
Term start	Term end	Office holder
25 April 1800	30 May 1814	Arnould Claude Gallois
