= Corsican Constitution =

1755 constitution of the Corsican Republic

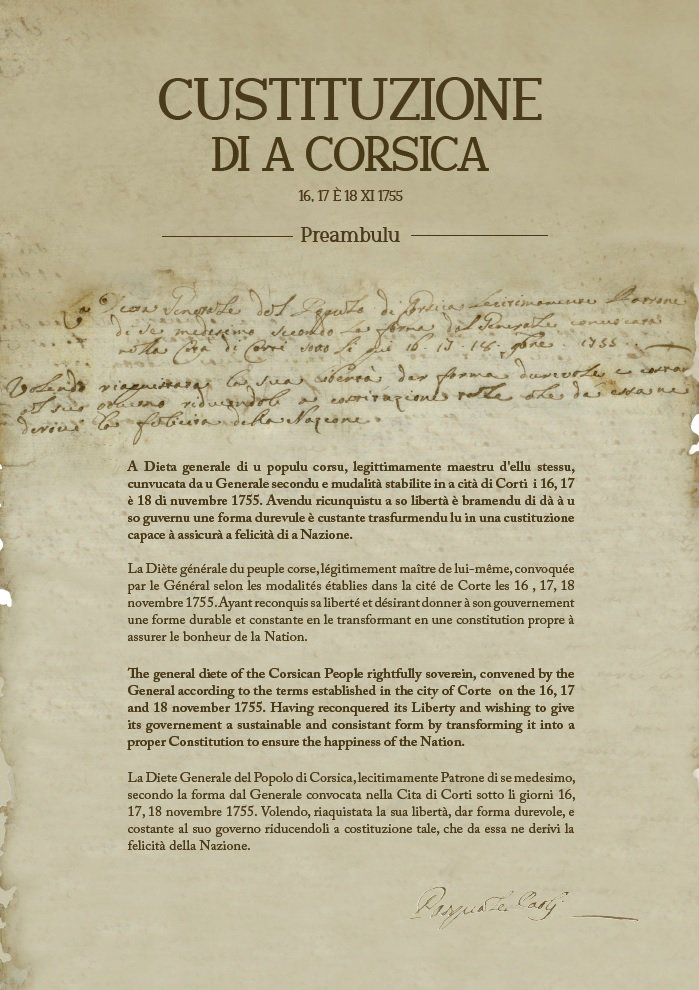
Preamble of the Corsican Constitution in Corsican, French, English and Italian

The first Corsican Constitution was drawn up in 1755 for the short-lived Corsican Republic independent from Genoa beginning in 1755, and remained in force until the annexation of Corsica by France in 1769. It was written in Tuscan Italian, the language of elite Corsican culture at the time.

It was drafted by Pasquale Paoli, and inspired by Jean-Jacques Rousseau who, commissioned by the Corsicans, in 1763 wrote Projet de constitution pour la Corse.

The second Corsican Constitution was drawn up in 1794 for the short-lived (1794–96) Anglo-Corsican Kingdom and introduced suffrage for all property owners. It was considered a highly democratic constitution for its time.

Linda Colley credits Paoli with writing the first written constitution of a nation state.
