= Lady of Bonifacio =

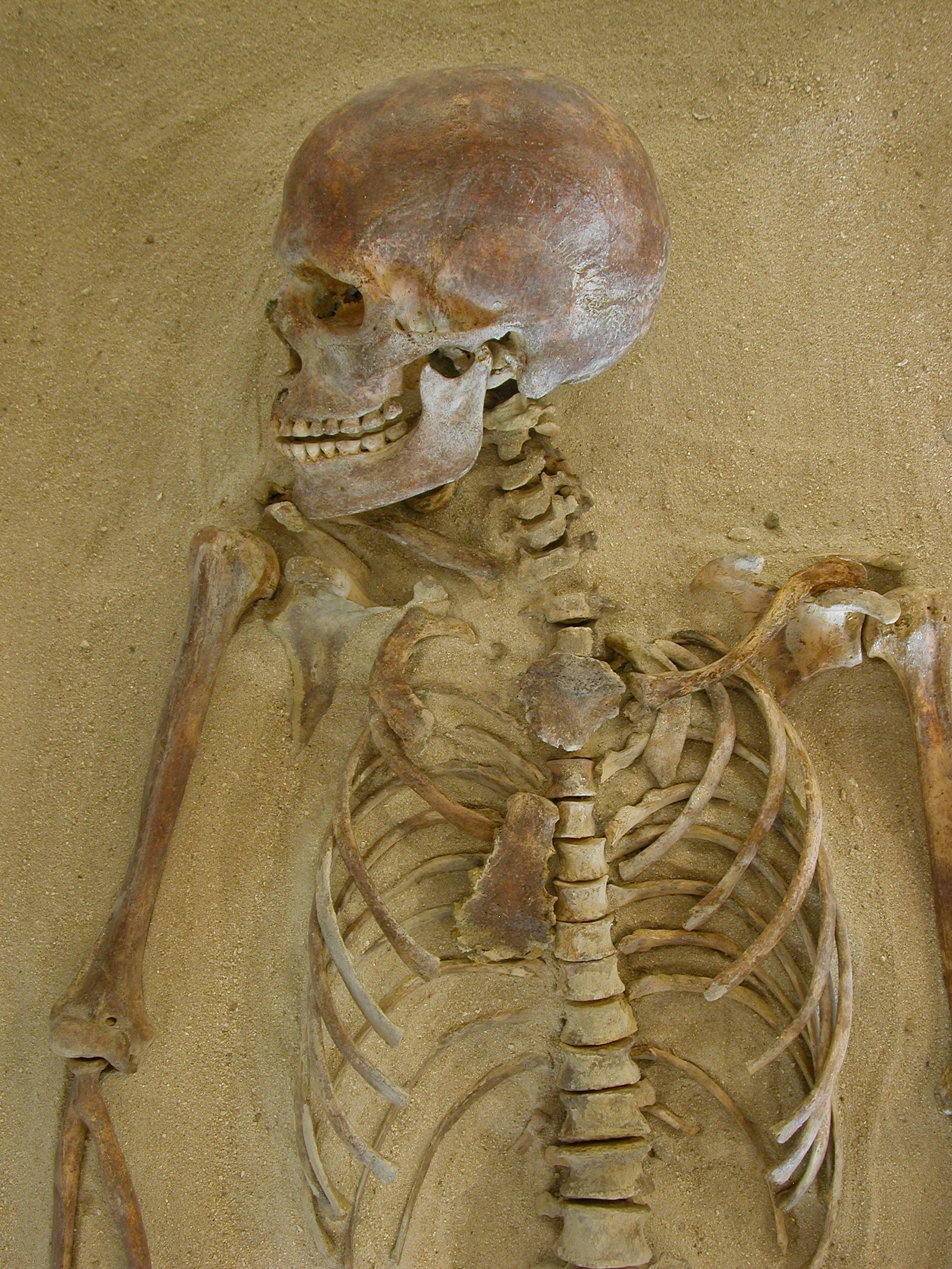
Lady of Bonifacio

A skeleton of a woman who lived in the Mesolithic is named Lady of Bonifacio. It was found at what is the Avenue Sylvère Bohn, north of Bonifacio, on Corsica. There is a rock shelter there, called Araguina-Sennola, which is classified as Monument historique.

Archeologists François de Lanfranchi (1926–2024) and Michel-Claude Weiss (1939–2021) found and excavated the skeleton, in 1972. It has been dated to an age of about 9100 to 9900 years. It is one of the oldest sepultures on Corsica.

== Description ==
People lived in the shelter from the Mesolithic to the present time, with an interruption during the Middle Ages. Other sepultures were found there as well. The stratigraphy consists of 53 layers, with a width of over 6 metres (20 ft). In 1998, it was classified as Monument historique.

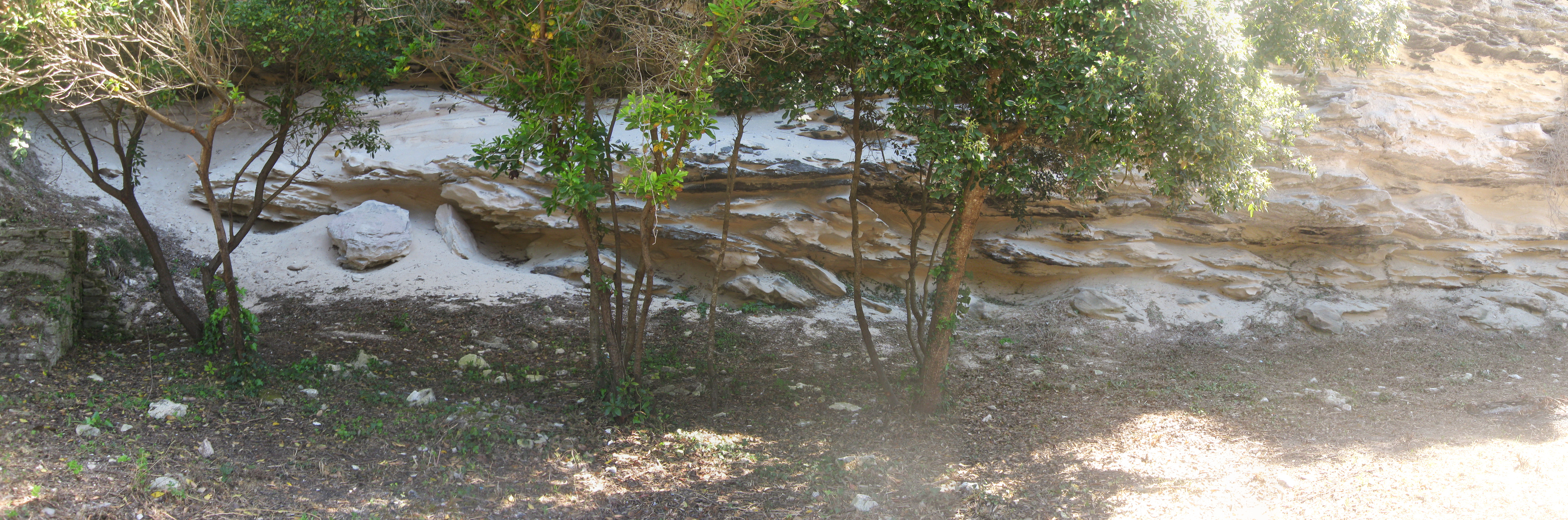
The Shelter where the skeleton was found

The Lady of Bonifacio was found in layer XVIIIb. This layer was classified as "island mesolithic", which means she was part of the mesolithic culture on the island. She had a height of 1.54 metres (5 ft 1 in) and was between 30 and 35 years old, at the time of her death. She was covered in a layer of red ochre. When she was buried, she lay on her back. This ritual is similar to other rituals in the Mesolithic of Continental Europe. During her life, she had growth problems. She also had gone through several injuries, among them Arthritis, a fracture of her left lower arm, a tumor on her shin, and different infections. Her left upper arm was paralyzed. Her left foot was malformed, which likely made walking difficult for her. She died of an infection, of one of her teeth. The tooth had broken.

Today, the skeleton is on display in the Museum Alta Roca, in Levie.

== Literature ==
- Sylvain Gagnière, François de Lanfranchi, Jean-Claude Miskovsky, Michel Prost, Josette Renault-Miskovsky, Michel-Claude Weiss: L'abri d'Araguina-Sennola à Bonifacio (Corse) In: Bulletin de la Société préhistorique française. Études et travaux, nos 66-1, 1969, S. 385–418 (ISSN 0583-8789 et 2437-2404).
- François de Lanfranchi, Michel-Claude Weiss: Le Néolithique ancien de l'abri d'Araguina-Sennola (Bonifacio, Corse) In: Bulletin de la Société préhistorique française. Études et travaux, nos 69-1, 1972, S. 376–388 (ISSN 0583-8789).
- François de Lanfranchi, Michel-Claude Weiss; Henri Duday: La sépulture prénéolithique de la couche XVIII de l'abri d'Araguina-Sennola (Bonifacio, Corse) In: Bulletin de la Société des Sciences Historiques et Naturelles de la Corse, no 606, 1973, S. 7–24 (ISSN 1154-7472).
