= Noël Jourda de Vaux =

French nobleman and General

Noël Jourda
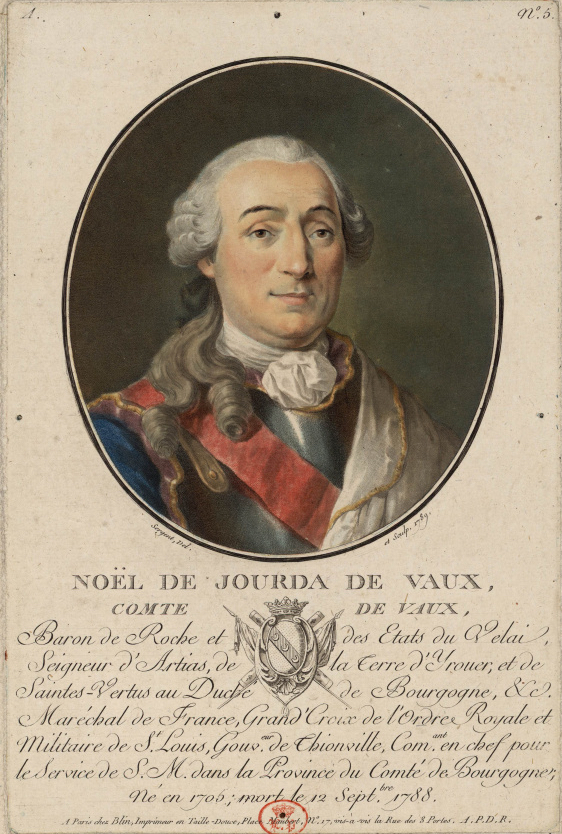
- Noël Jourda, comte de Vaux (Musée de la Révolution française)
- Born: 12 March 1705; Le Puy-en-Velay
- Died: 14 September 1788 (aged 83); Grenoble
- Burial place: Paray (heart) / Retournac (body)
- Military career
- Allegiance: Kingdom of France
- Branch: French Army
- Service years: 1723–1788
- Rank: Marshal of France
- Conflicts: War of the Austrian Succession; Seven Years' War; French conquest of Corsica
- Awards: Knight of the Order of Saint Louis

Noël Jourda de Vaux (12 March 1705 in Château des Vaux au Puy-en-Velay – 14 September 1788 in Grenoble), comte de Vaux, seigneur d'Artiac was a French nobleman and General. He oversaw the conquest of the Corsican Republic in 1769. He was given command of land forces in the planned Franco-Spanish Invasion of Britain in 1779, but this was abandoned. He became a Marshal of France in 1783. He was the son of Jean Baptiste Jourda de Vaux, seigneur de Retournac (born 1687) and Marie Anne de Saint-Germain.

== Life ==
=== Military career ===
He entered the army on 16 October 1723 as ensign in the Régiment d'Infanterie d'Auvergne. His first campaign was in Italy in 1733, as a lieutenant in the same regiment. He fought at Parma on 29 June 1734 and at the battle of Guastalla on 19 September, where he was wounded twice. From January 1738 to April 1741 he served on Corsica as a captain under the orders of general Maillebois, distinguishing himself at the defence of Ghisoni. He was made a knight of the order of Saint Louis and was made commander of Corte.

He then fought in Germany under Belle-Isle, winning renown at the Siege of Prague in 1742 and fighting in two other sieges and one battle. On 6 March 1743, at the request of marshal Broglie, he was made colonel of the régiment d'Angoumois. He assisted at the sieges of Menin and Ypres in 1744. Marshal Saxe saw him fight with distinction at the Battle of Fontenoy on 10 May 1745 and at the sieges of Tournai, Oudenarde, Dendermonde and Ath.

His participation in the siege of Brussels won him promotion to brigadier on 23 February 1746. He served at the Siege of Namur (1746) on 11 October and the battle of Rocoux. He served at the siege of l'Écluse, the Fort of Issendick and Philippine. Manoeuvring at Malines, Tirlemont, he assisted at the Battle of Lauffeld on 2 July 1747 and was wounded a fifth time at the Siege of Bergen op Zoom. Captured in 1748, he was promoted to maréchal de camp on 10 May, lieutenant du Roi at Besançon on 4 July 1752, then lieutenant général des armées du roi on 17 December 1759.

In January 1760, he left Corsica for Germany, joining marshal Broglie's army on 1 April. On 13 April, he assisted in the battle of Bergen and the attack on general Wargenheim's camp on 19 September. He defended the plain of Göttingen until 19 May 1761, when the king rewarded him with the governorship of Thionville.

=== 1770 to his death ===
In February 1769 the comte de Vaux was put in command of the French forces on Corsica. He landed on the island on 7 April and reached Saint-Florent on 22 June. General de Vaux wrote to the duc de Choiseul "The whole of Corsica is submitted to the King" and on 1 August was made governor general.

On 10 April 1779 he ceded his command to the comte de Marbeuf to be made commander in chief of the army meant for a landing in England with Spanish naval support. This army also included Rochambeau and Lafayette. However, the project was abandoned and in 1780 de Vaux was instead made commander in chief of the province of the county of Burgundy. On 13 June 1783 he was made marshal of France, with the motto "Terror belli, Decus pacis" inscribed on his marshal's baton.

At the end of June 1788, just after the Day of the Tiles, de Vaux replaced the duc de Clermont-Tonnerre as lieutenant général commanding the province of the Dauphiné, with orders to suppress the popular uprising. However, he had only just arrived in Grenoble when he fell ill, dying aged 83 on 14 September 1788. He had fought in thirty sieges and five major battles and been wounded five times. In his will he asked that his heart be buried at Paray, of which he was seigneur, and his body in the chapelle de Vaux in the church at Retournac, the land of his birth.

== Marriage and issue ==
On 21 November 1741 he married Jeanne de La Porte (?-1775) and they had two children

- Jeanne-Marie - born 1745, married 3 September 1765: Louis marquis de Vauborel, (?-1832).
- Adélaïde-Jeanne - married on 29 September 1770: François comte de Fougières, (?-1787); married secondly on 1 August 1789: Charles Morey comte de Pontgibault.

== Sources ==
- Galeries historiques du Palais de Versailles, de Charles Gavard - Page 491 - 1842
- Dictionnaire universel, historique, critique, et bibliographique, de Louis Mayeul Chaudon- Page 515 - 1812
