= Treaty of Bastia =

1814 treaty between Corsican nationalists and Great Britain

The Treaty of Bastia was an agreement signed in 1814 (near the end of the Napoleonic Wars) between Corsican nationalists and Lord William Bentinck, commander of British forces in Italy. It gave sovereignty over the island to the British Crown, while allowing local self-government.

The treaty arose after assemblies of Corsican notables met in Bastia, Saint-Florent, and L'Île-Rousse, and sent an invitation to Bentinck to send troops and take control of Corsica from French imperial forces. Bentinck sent British troops to Corsica, which drove out the French. Recalling the Anglo-Corsican Kingdom of 1794–1796, Bentinck signed the Treaty of Bastia.

Bentinck was also an advocate of Italian unification and may have regarded the treaty as a step towards Corsica later joining Italy.

The British Foreign Secretary, Castlereagh, rejected any revival of the Anglo-Corsican Kingdom. He was a strong supporter of Bourbon Restoration in France and all its former dominions. As it had already been agreed by Britain and her allies that Louis XVIII was to rule Corsica, he sent an order to repudiate the treaty.

The treaty was not universally accepted by Corsicans. The Court of Appeals in Ajaccio specifically rejected its legality.

== Bibliography ==
- Gregory, Desmond (1985). The Ungovernable Rock: The Anglo-Corsican Kingdom. Associated University Press.
