= Charles Louis de Marbeuf =

French general (1712–1786)

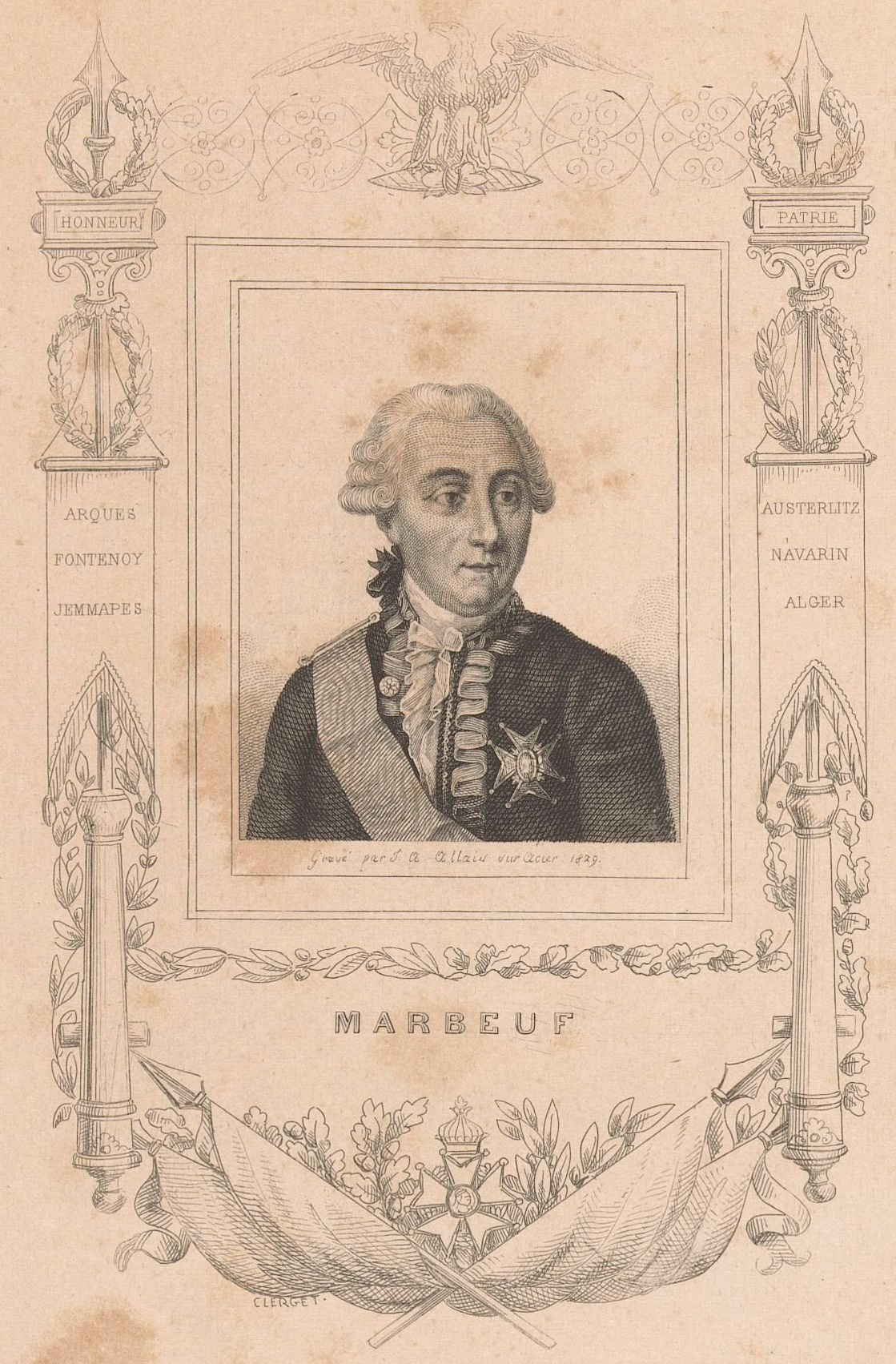

Louis Charles René, comte de Marbeuf (4 November 1712, Rennes – 20 September 1786, Bastia), grand-cross of the order of Saint Louis, was a French general.

== Life ==
The son of a Breton lord, he served in the ancien regime army, becoming colonel of the dragons de Condé, before taking part in the pacification of Corsica, at first as interim army commander between Chauvelin and the comte de Vaux (December 1768 – April 1769), then as commander of a corps under Vaux until the battle of Ponte Novu. In 1774 he built the village of Cargèse for a group of Greek colonists who were living in Ajaccio. On 29 September 1783 he married Catherine Antoinette Salinguerra de Gayardon de Fenoyl in Paris.

He was made marquis de Cargèse for his government of Corsica on Louis XV's behalf. During his stay on Corsica he became friends with the Bonaparte family and acted as Napoleon Bonaparte's protector, obtaining a place at the military collège at Brienne for him, as is recalled in The Memorial of Saint Helena. However, the naming of rue Marbeuf near the Champs-Élysées is not to be attributed to a house that Louis Charles René had in Paris.
