= François Claude Chauvelin =

French soldier, writer and diplomat

François Claude Bernard Louis de Chauvelin (Paris, 1716 – Versailles, 1773), marquis de Chauvelin, was a French soldier, diplomat and writer. He was a correspondent of Voltaire. One of his three children with his wife Agnés Thérèse Mazade d'Argeville (whom he married in 1759), was Bernard-François, marquis de Chauvelin.

== Life ==
He served in Italy and Flanders and became ambassador to Genoa and Turin. From 1749 to 1753 he was Lieutenant-général of the King of France in Genoa. He was commander-in-chief of French troops on Corsica from May 1768 to July 1769 during the Conquest of Corsica. He passed his final days in the French royal court as an intimate of Louis XV, dying of an apoplexy at the king's gaming table.

== Sources ==
- Dictionnaire Bouillet
