= Battle of Ponte Novu =

1769 battle

- Part of French conquest of Corsica
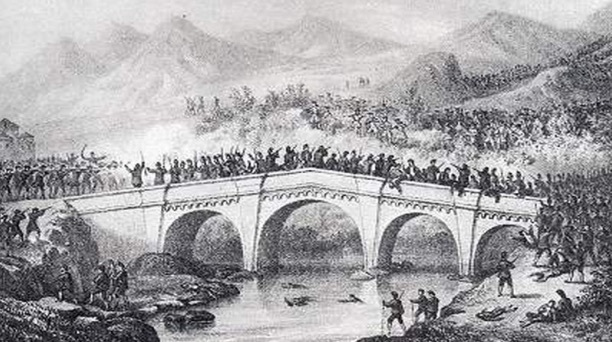
- A depiction of the battle of Ponte Novu
Date	May 8–9, 1769
Location	Ponte Novu 42°29′6″N 9°16′48″E
Result	French victory

Belligerents
Corsican Republic	France

Commanders and leaders
Carlo Salicetti	Noël Jourda

Strength
15,000	15,000

Casualties and losses
Unknown	Unknown

The Battle of Ponte Novu took place on May 8 and 9, 1769, between royal French forces under the Comte de Vaux, a seasoned professional soldier with an expert on mountain warfare on his staff, and the native Corsicans under Carlo Salicetti. It was the battle that effectively ended the fourteen-year-old Corsican Republic and opened the way to annexation by France the following year.

The Corsican commander-in-chief, Pasquale Paoli, was trying to raise troops in the vicinity but was not present in person. He trusted the defence to his second-in-command, Salicetti. His forces included a company of Corsican women under a female captain named Serpentini.

Ponte Novu is a Genovese bridge over the river Golo in north central Corsica in Castello-di-Rostino commune. The battle opened the route through the rugged mountains to the Corsican capital of Corte. The battle is important as it marked the end of the Corsican war and paved the way for the incorporation of Corsica into France.

Voltaire, in his Précis du Siècle de Louis XV, admiringly wrote about the battle: "The principal weapon of the Corsicans was their courage. This courage was so great that in one of these battles, near a river named Golo, they made a rampart of their dead in order to have the time to reload behind them before making a necessary retreat; their wounded were mixed among the dead to strengthen the rampart. Bravery is found everywhere, but such actions aren't seen except among free people."

== Strategy ==
The French strategy The French strategy was to disembark at Bastia, follow the current course of Route N193 (built over the old road) up the Golo River valley and over the passes to Corte, seizing the strategic center of Paoli's political power.

The Corsican strategy The Corsican strategy was to block the passage at Ponte Novu, a choke point where the road had to cross the river on the bridge. To do this Paoli stationed substantial forces on either side of the bridge. Gaffori was posted to the north above the road at Lento and Grimaldi at Canavaggia. These forces were intended to prevent a build-up before the bridge. To that end the militia was placed on the road before the bridge as well. Paoli had his headquarters at Rostino above the bridge.

== Tactics ==
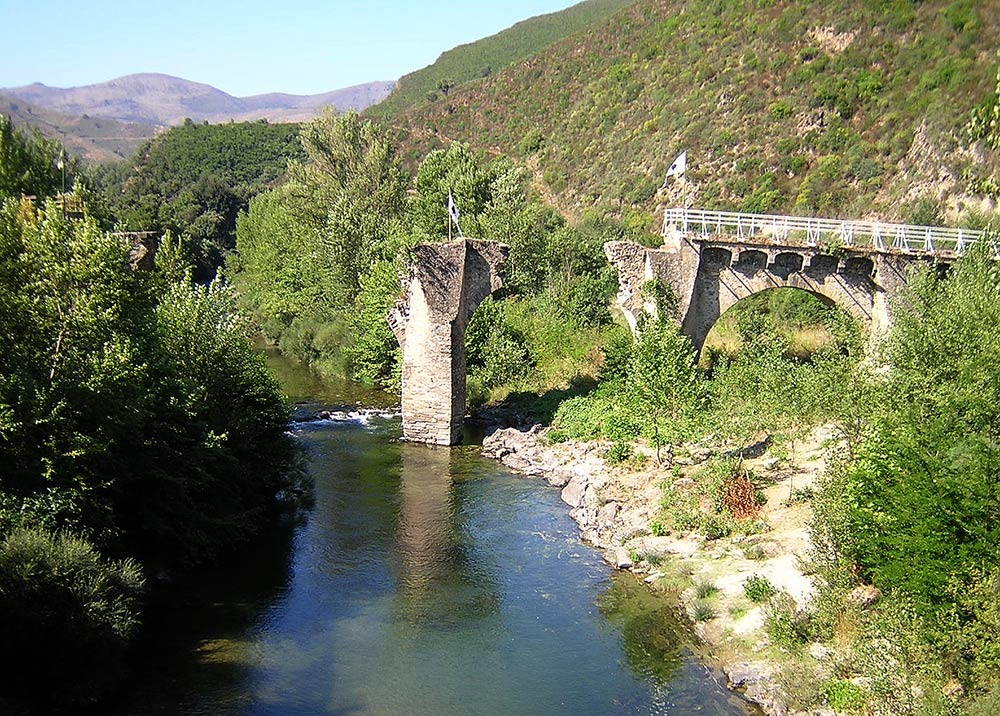
Ponte Novu today. The destruction dates to World War II, when the bridge was destroyed by the retreating Germans.

Tactically the battle was something less than a model. Different historians give rather different pictures of the battle, but there are some elements in common. The bridge was actually being held by a unit of Prussian mercenaries which formerly had worked for the Genoese but whom Paoli had managed to employ once the Genoese no longer needed their services. Though working for Paoli, this unit opened fire on Corsican troops trying to retreat over the bridge under pressure from the French. A slaughter resulted from the crossfire, the river ran red and the rest of the Corsican army retreated in disorder. Bodies began showing up downstream.

The circumstances under which the Corsicans were trying to cross the bridge and the reasons why the Prussians opened fire and continued with a sustained fire are not clear. The accounts vary on this point but the courage and loyalty of the Corsican troops and their officers are clearly in question, with a suggestion of divisiveness regarding the French. Politically Corsica was not of one mind (as it is not today). Paoli found it necessary to enforce unity by burning the farms and executing the relatives of dissidents to Corsican rule, and everywhere the French were rewarding the cooperation of the Corsicans.

In the most flattering account, the Corsicans began the attack, splitting their forces to send 2000 men across the bridge against a much superior force, hence their reputation for bravery. Discovering the foolishness of their choice, they attempted to retreat across the river but for an unknown reason were met by the volley fire of the Prussians. Apparently, the shooters believed they were stopping an unauthorized retreat. Fortifying themselves as best they could, the majority of the 2000 died in the crossfire. Seeing their defeat, the confused troops on the other side retreated in disorder, pursued by the French.

A less flattering version accuses Grimaldi of treachery and Gaffori of cowardice. Grimaldi, it asserts, was paid by the French to take no action and Gaffori feared to do so alone. Seeing the French come up with fixed bayonets, the militia before the bridge ran for their lives, attempted to force the bridge and were fired upon by the Prussians in self-defense.

The stories are not compatible, but Napoleon himself testified to the defense behind the rampart of the slain before the bridge and he is known to have gone over the battlefield with Paoli in 1790. One can only presume that Paoli had stationed his best and most loyal troops along the opposite bank and that, seeing the rout, they ran forward over the bridge to rescue the situation. This possibility places the Prussian unit in a very bad light. There appears to be no possibility, in this version, that they kept up a sustained fire by mistake, but evidence of collusion with the French, though a logical circumstance, did not survive.

Paoli, at his headquarters, was then confronted with a general rout. It was perhaps at this point that the coat he later brought to England, if it was genuine, was shredded by French musket balls. From a military perspective, it is striking that Paoli did not tour the front line or position himself behind it, as both Napoleon and Wellington did in their battles. Instead, the less experienced troops were left with the impression that they were fighting largely on their own. In summary, it is probably fair to conclude that Corsica was not sufficiently united to mount an effective defense: Paoli’s senior officers defected, his troops lacked motivation, and he was forced to rely on mercenaries of questionable loyalty against numerically superior French forces led by experienced veterans and professional officers.

== Gallery ==
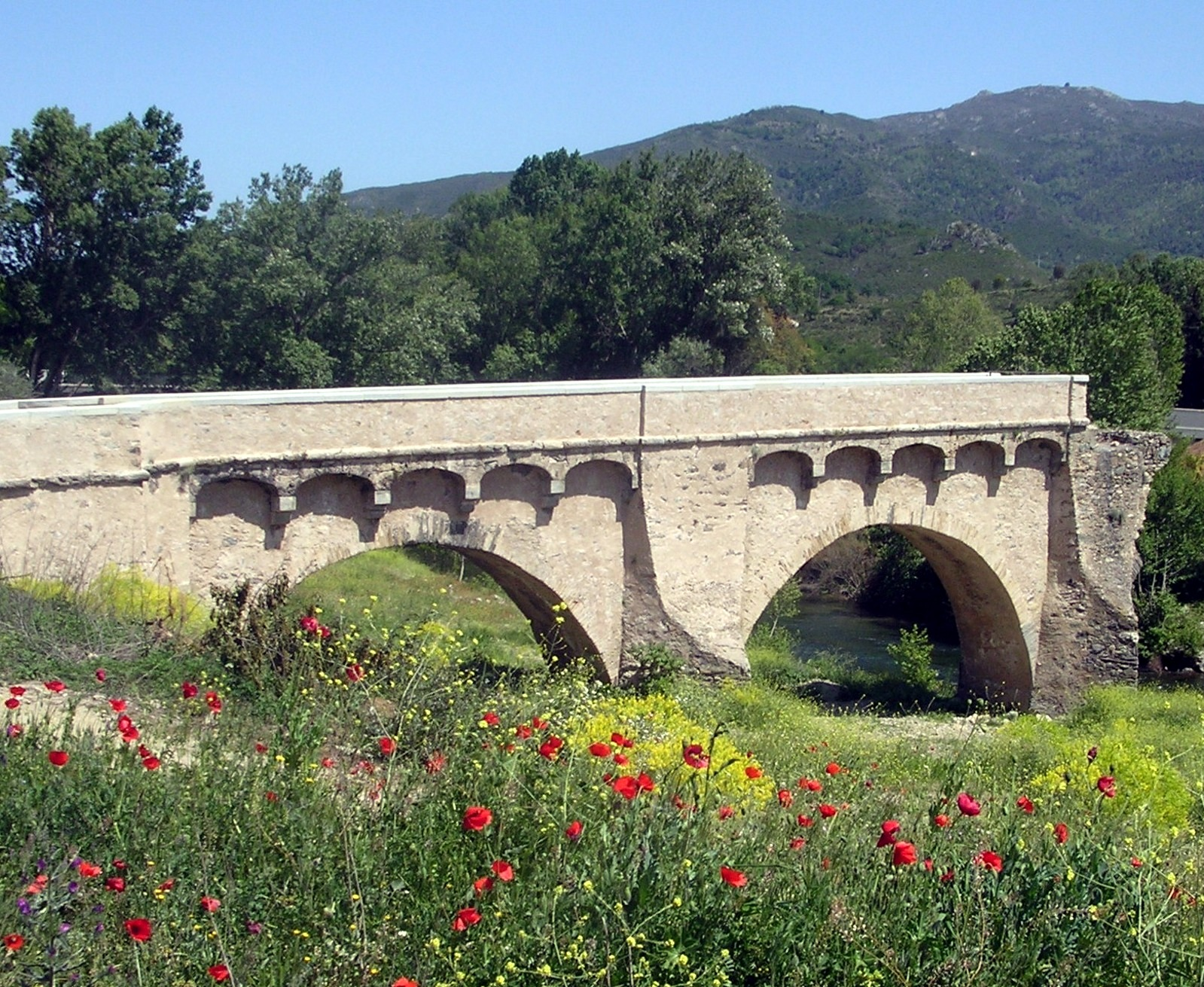

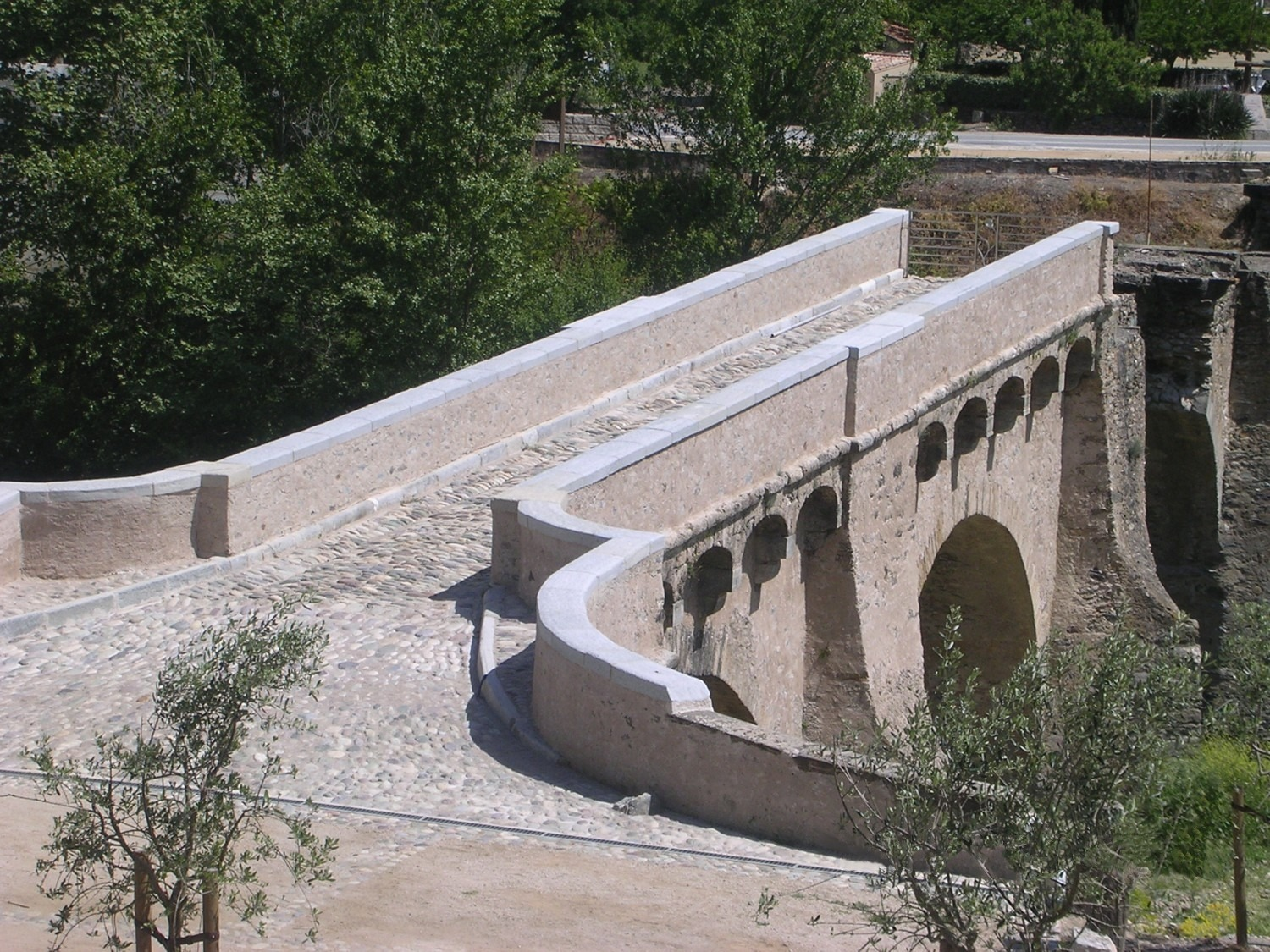

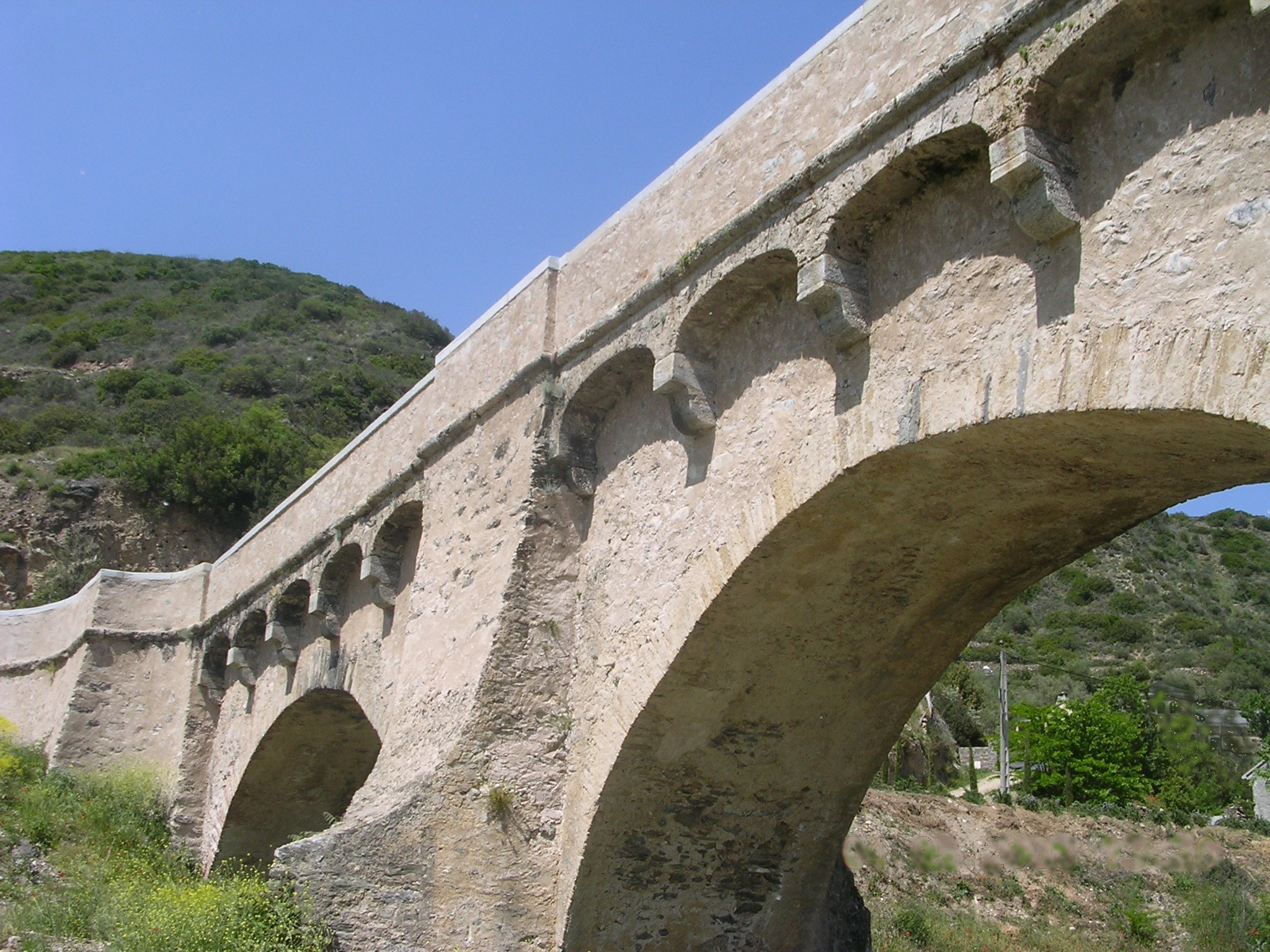

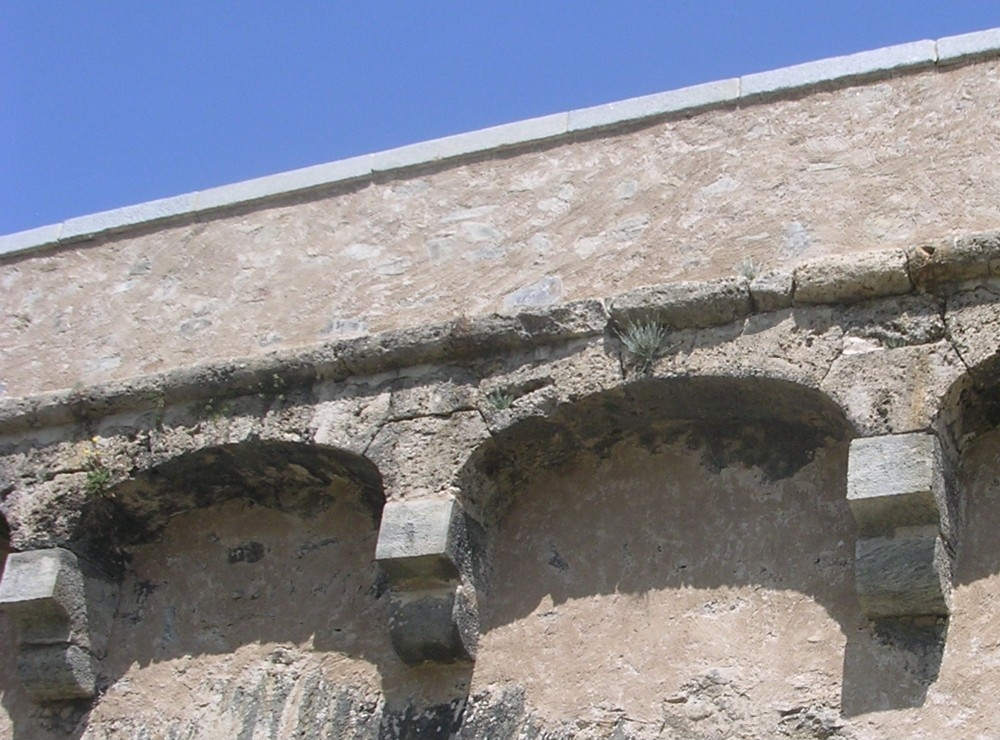
