= Elizabeth Upton, Baroness Templetown =

English artist

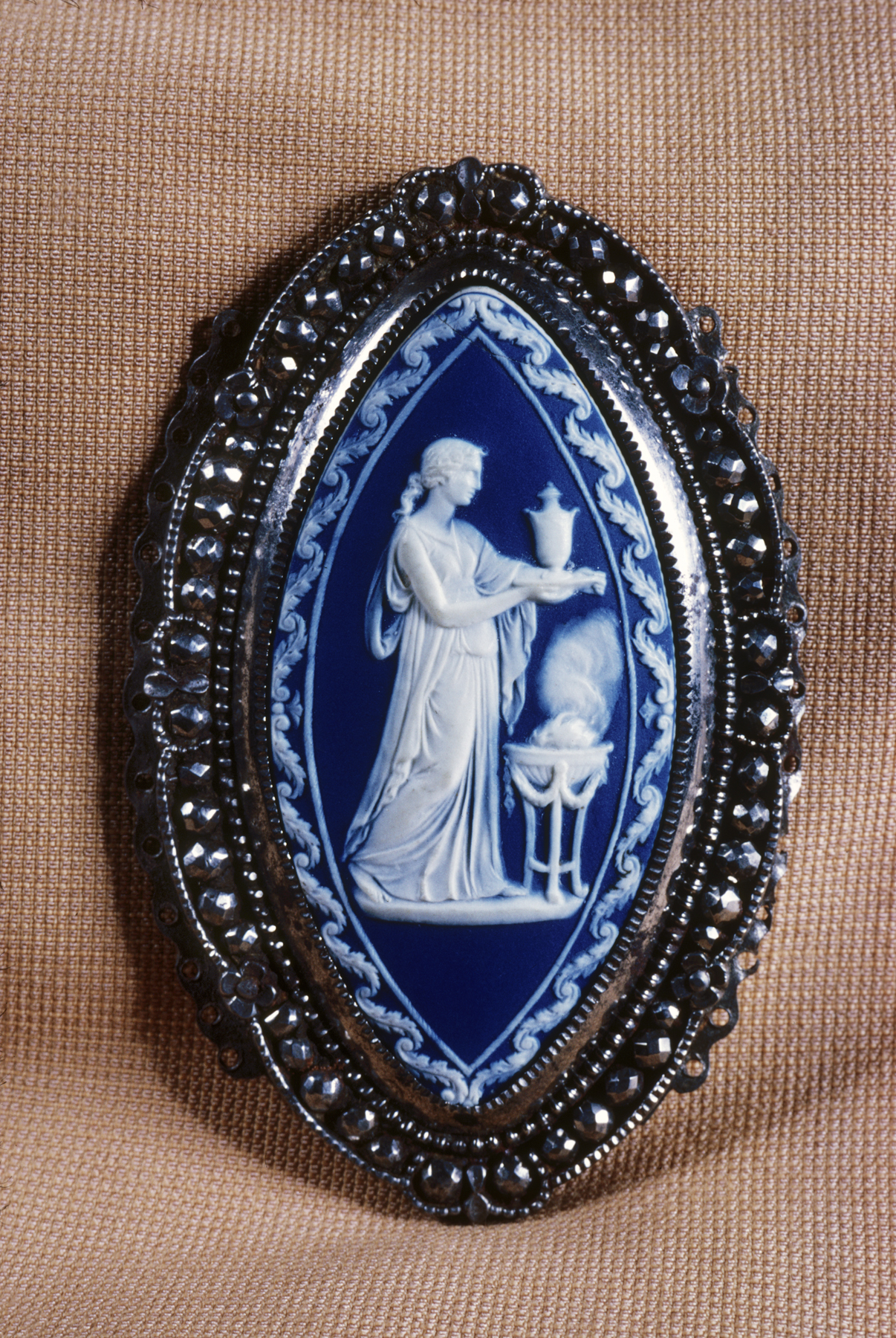
Jasperware belt clasp designed by Lady Templeton and Miss Crew for Wedgwood The Walters Art Museum

Elizabeth Upton, Baroness Templetown (née Boughton; 1746/47 – c. 30 September 1823) was an English artist whose designs were used by Josiah Wedgwood the potter. She specialised in detailed cut-paper work which adapted well to Wedgwood's jasperware with white bas relief scenes on coloured backgrounds. Wedgwood first chose one of her designs in 1783, and his 1787 catalogue referred to her as having "exquisite taste" and "charming groups". Several of the designs Wedgwood used have a feminine or domestic theme. She also painted in watercolours and sculpted in clay. Of particular note were her sculptures of family, including grandchildren. A famous bust was made of her son-in-law the Marquess of Bristol.

== Personal life ==
Born in Herefordshire, she was the third daughter of Shuckburgh Boughton and granddaughter of Sir William Boughton, 4th Baronet. She married Clotworthy Upton in 1769. Their family home was Castle Upton in Templepatrick, County Antrim, Ireland. In 1776, her husband became Baron Templetown.

Lady Templetown stayed in Rome a lot towards the end of her life, dying in 1823. Her brother, Charles, was a Member of Parliament.

Her children included:

- Elizabeth Albana Upton, who married Frederick, 1st Marquess of Bristol
