= General Upton =

General Upton may refer to:

- Arthur Upton (1777–1855), British Army general
- Emory Upton (1839–1881), Union Army brigadier general and brevet major general
- George Upton, 3rd Viscount Templetown (1802–1890), British Army general

== See also ==
- Gabrielle Upton (born 1964), Attorney General of New South Wales
