= Clotworthy Upton =

Clotworthy Upton may refer to:

- Clotworthy Upton (1665−1725), Member of Parliament of Ireland for, successively, Newtownards and Antrim County constituencies; uncle of the 1st Baron Templetown
- Clotworthy Upton, 1st Baron Templetown (1721–1785)
- Clotworthy Upton (Royal Navy officer) (1768–1822)
