= Resident Commissioner, Trincomalee Dockyard =

Office of the Resident Commissioner, Trincomalee
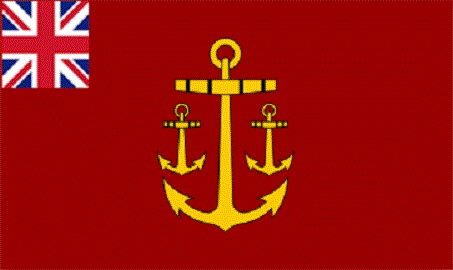
- Navy Board Flag
- Navy Office
- Member of: Navy Board
- Reports to: Comptroller of the Navy
- Nominator: First Naval Lord
- Appointer: Prime Minister; Subject to formal approval by the King-in-Council
- Term length: Not fixed (typically 1–3 years)
- Formation: 1810-1832

The Resident Commissioner at Trincomalee, also known as the Resident Commissioner of the Navy at Trincomalee, was chief representative of the Navy Board based at Trincomalee Dockyard. He was senior official of the yard responsible for the supervision of the principal officers of the yard from 1810 to 1832.

== Duties ==
The resident commissioner was responsible for superintending all the officers, artificers and labourers employed at the yard. He controlled all payments to staff and examined their accounts. In addition he contracted and drew down bills on behalf of the Navy Office to supply shortfalls in naval stores levels.

== Office Holders ==
1. 1810–1816, Captain Peter Puget.
2. 1818–1822, Captain Clotworthy Upton.
