= Viscount Templetown =

Extinct title in the Peerage of Ireland

Arms of Upton, Viscount Templetown: Sable, a cross moline or These are a differenced version of the arms of Upton of Upton in Cornwall, later of Lupton, Brixham in Devon

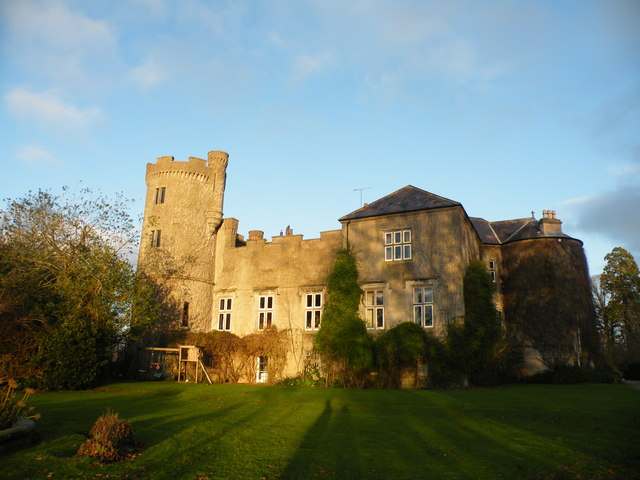
Castle Upton, County Antrim, seat of the Upton family

Viscount Templetown, named for a place in County Antrim, was a title in the Peerage of Ireland. It was created on 13 February 1806 for John Upton, 2nd Baron Templetown, Member of Parliament for Bury St Edmunds. He was the son of Clotworthy Upton, who served as Clerk Comptroller to Augusta, Dowager Princess of Wales. On 3 August 1776 he had been raised to the Peerage of Ireland as Baron Templetown, of Templetown in the County of Antrim. The first Viscount was succeeded by his eldest son, the second Viscount. He never married and on his death the titles passed to his younger brother, the third Viscount. He was a general in the Army and also sat as Conservative Member of Parliament for County Antrim from 1859 to 1863. Between 1866 and 1890, Lord Templetown sat in the House of Lords as an Irish representative peer. He was succeeded by his nephew, the fourth Viscount. He was the son of the Honourable Edward John Upton, fourth son of the first Viscount. Lord Templetown was an Irish Representative Peer from 1894 to 1939. His eldest son was killed in the First World War and he was succeeded by his second and only surviving son, the fifth Viscount. He was for many years a member of the county council of the Stewartry of Kirkcudbright. He had one son, who predeceased him, and one daughter, who survived him. On his death in 1981 without a male heir, his titles became extinct.

Three other members of the Upton family of some notability are: Arthur Upton, brother of the first Baron, who represented Carrickfergus in the Irish House of Commons, Fulke Howard (who assumed the surname of Howard in 1807), second son of the first Baron, who was Member of Parliament for Castle Rising, and Arthur Upton, third son of the first Baron, a cricketer and politician.

The ancestral seat of the Upton family was Castle Upton, County Antrim.

== Barons Templetown (1776) ==
- Clotworthy Upton, 1st Baron Templetown (1721–1785)
- John Henry Upton, 2nd Baron Templetown (1771–1846) (created Viscount Templetown in 1806)

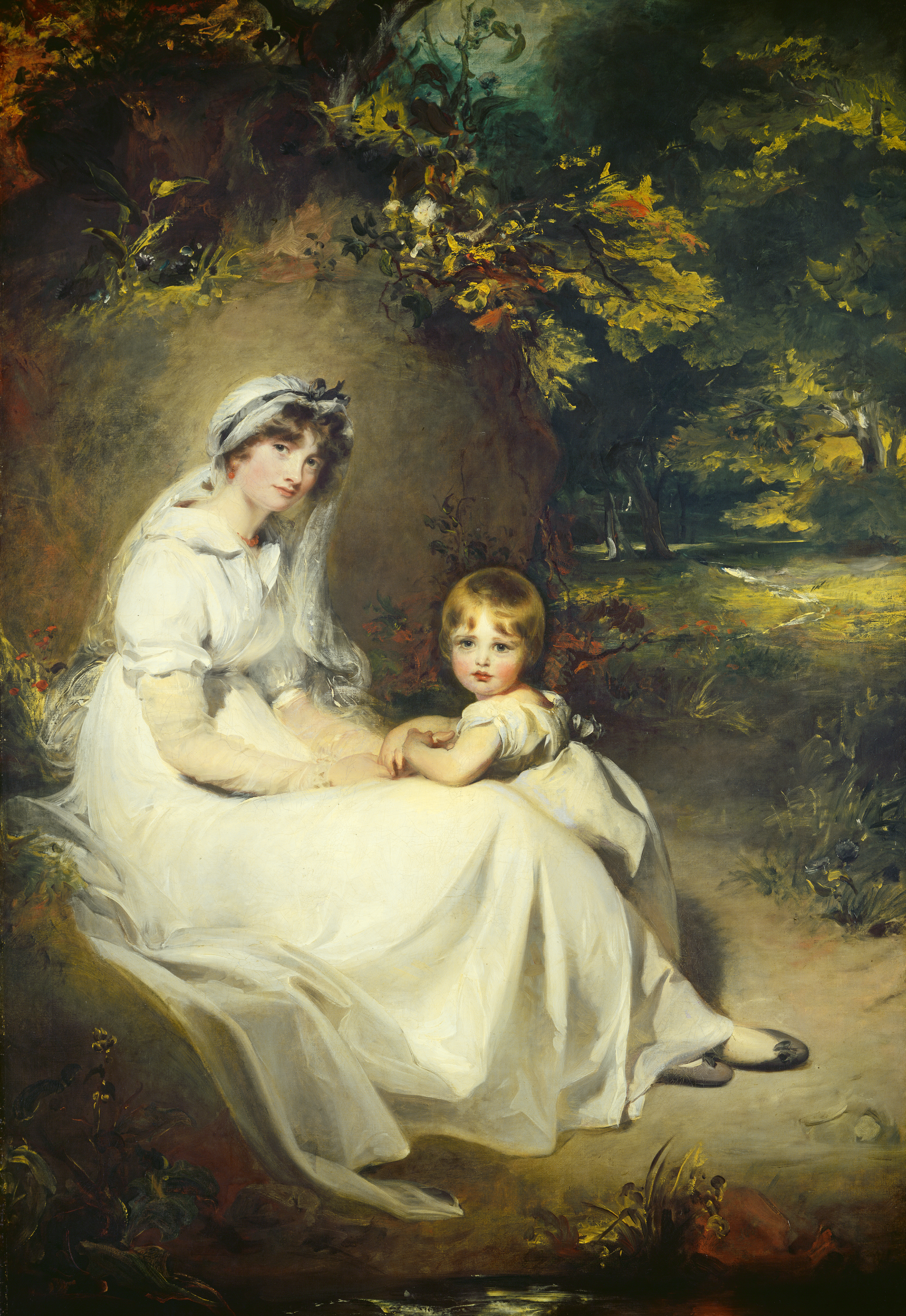
Lady Mary Montagu (daughter of 5th Earl of Sandwich and Lady Mary, coheiress of 6th Duke of Bolton). wife of 1st Viscount and mother of the 2nd and 3rd Viscount

== Viscounts Templetown (1806) ==
- John Henry Upton, 1st Viscount Templetown (1771–1846)
- Henry Montagu Upton, 2nd Viscount Templetown (1799–1863)
- George Frederick Upton, 3rd Viscount Templetown (1802–1890)
- Henry Edward Montagu Dorington Clotworthy Upton, 4th Viscount Templetown (1853–1939)
- Henry Augustus George Mountjoy Heneage Upton, 5th Viscount Templetown (1894–1981)
