= John Upton, 1st Viscount Templetown =

Anglo-Irish politician

Arms of Upton, Viscount Templetown: Sable, a cross moline or These are a differenced version of the arms of Upton of Upton in Cornwall, later of Lupton, Brixham in Devon

John Henry Upton, 1st Viscount Templetown (8 November 1771 – 21 September 1846), styled The Honourable John Upton between 1776 and 1785 and known as The Lord Templetown between 1785 and 1806, was an Anglo-Irish politician.

Upton was the eldest legitimate son of Clotworthy Upton, 1st Baron Templetown, Clerk Comptroller to Augusta, Dowager Princess of Wales, by Elizabeth Boughton, daughter of Shuckburgh Boughton. Clotworthy Upton was his older brother, and the Honourable Arthur Upton and the Honourable Fulke Greville Howard were his younger brothers. He succeeded his father in the barony in April 1785, aged 13.

This was an Irish peerage and entitled him to a seat in the Irish House of Lords after his 21st birthday in 1792. However, he was still able to stand for election to the British House of Commons and in 1802 he was returned to Parliament as one of two representatives for Bury St Edmunds. In 1806 he was created Viscount Templetown, in the County of Antrim, in the Irish peerage. He continued to represent Bury St Edmunds in Parliament until 1812.

== Marriage, children and succession ==
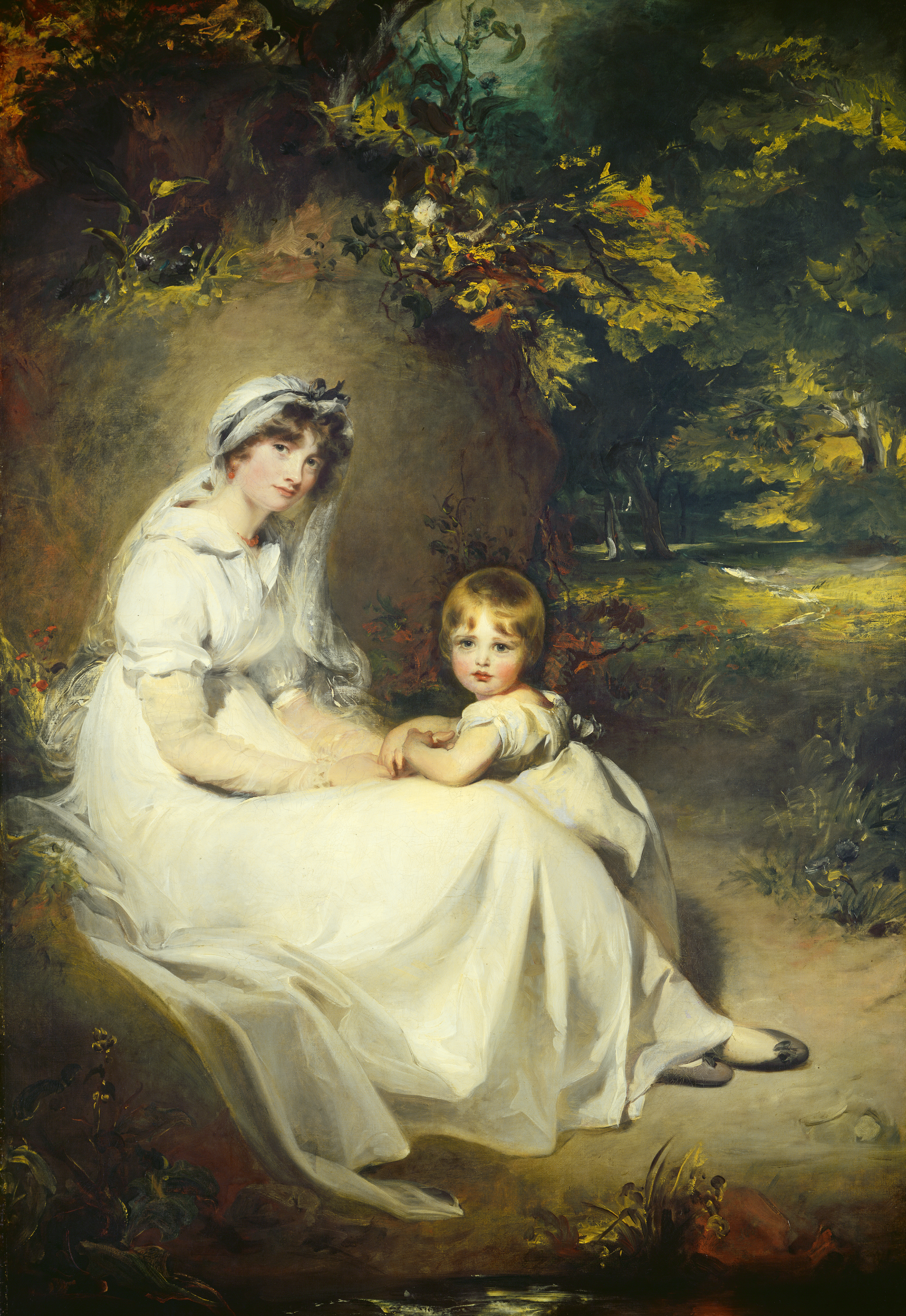
Lady Mary Templetown (née Montagu) and Her Eldest Son, by Sir Thomas Lawrence 1802

Lord Templetown married Lady Mary Montagu, daughter of John Montagu, 5th Earl of Sandwich and Lady Mary Powlett, daughter and coheiress of Harry Powlett, 6th Duke of Bolton . She died in October 1824. Templetown survived her by over 20 years and died in September 1846, aged 74. He was succeeded by his eldest son, Henry. His second son George, who eventually succeeded in the title, was a general in the British Army, as was his third son, Arthur.

Parliament of the United Kingdom
Preceded by Lord Hervey; Lord Charles FitzRoy	Member of Parliament for Bury St Edmunds; 1803–1812; With: Lord Charles FitzRoy	Succeeded by Lord Charles FitzRoy; Frederick Foster
Peerage of Ireland
New creation	Viscount Templetown; 1806–1846	Succeeded by Henry Montagu Upton
Preceded by Clotworthy Upton	Baron Templetown; 1785–1846	Succeeded by Henry Montagu Upton
