= Frederick Foster (politician) =

Irish politician (1777-?)

Frederick Thomas Hervey Foster (1777–?), of Dunleer, County Louth, was a politician.

He was a Member of Parliament (MP) for Bury St Edmunds 1812 to 1818.

Parliament of the United Kingdom
Preceded by The Lord Templetown; Lord Charles FitzRoy	Member of Parliament for Bury St Edmunds; 1812 – 1818; With: Lord Charles FitzRoy	Succeeded by The Earl of Euston; Arthur Upton
