= Lord Charles FitzRoy (British Army officer, born 1764) =

British Army officer and politician (1764–1829)

General Lord Charles FitzRoy

Member of Parliament for Bury St Edmunds
- In office 1802–1818 Serving with Lord Hervey, The Lord Templetown, Frederick Foster
- Preceded by: Sir Charles Davers, Bt; Lord Hervey
- Succeeded by: Earl of Euston; Arthur Upton

Member of Parliament for Bury St Edmunds
- In office 1787–1796 Serving with Sir Charles Davers, Bt
- Preceded by: Sir Charles Davers, Bt; George FitzRoy
- Succeeded by: Sir Charles Davers, Bt; Lord Hervey

Personal details
- Born: 17 July 1764
- Died: 20 December 1829 (aged 65) Berkeley Square, London
- Spouses: Frances Mundy (m. 1795; died 1797) Lady Frances Stewart (m. 1799; died 1810)
- Relations: Henry Liddell, 1st Baron Ravensworth (grandfather)
- Children: Charles Augustus FitzRoy; George FitzRoy; Robert FitzRoy; Frances Rice-Trevor, Baroness Dynevor
- Parent(s): Augustus FitzRoy, 3rd Duke of Grafton; Anne FitzPatrick
- Education: Harrow School
- Alma mater: Trinity College, Cambridge

General Lord Charles FitzRoy (17 July 1764 – 20 December 1829) was a British Army officer and politician.

== Early life ==
FitzRoy was born on 17 July 1764. He was the third, but second surviving, son of Augustus FitzRoy, 3rd Duke of Grafton and, his first wife, Anne Liddell, a daughter of Henry Liddell, 1st Baron Ravensworth.

After education at Harrow School and Trinity College, Cambridge, he entered the army in 1782 as an ensign.

== Career ==
In 1787, he was appointed a captain in the Scots Guards and an equerry in 1788, to Prince Frederick, Duke of York and Albany, under whom he served in Flanders from 1793 to 1794.

In 1795, FitzRoy was appointed an aide-de-camp to King George III with the rank of colonel and promoted to major-general in 1798. From 1798 to 1799, he served in Ireland then in England until 1809, commanding a battalion of the 60th Regiment of Foot from 1804 to 1805. He was appointed colonel of the 48th (Northamptonshire) Regiment of Foot and lieutenant-general in 1805 and general in 1814.

From 1787 to 1796 and again from 1802 to 1818, FitzRoy was Member of Parliament for Bury St Edmunds (though never actually spoke in the house). He supported Pitt and favoured abolitionism and Catholic Emancipation.

== Personal life ==
On 20 June 1795, FitzRoy married Frances Mundy, the daughter of Edward Miller Mundy, MP. Before her death in 1797, they had one son:

- Sir Charles Augustus FitzRoy (1796–1858), who served as the governor of New South Wales, governor of Prince Edward Island and governor of Antigua; he married Lady Mary Lennox, eldest child of Charles Lennox, 4th Duke of Richmond, in 1820. After her death in 1847, he married Margaret Gordon in 1855.

After his wife's death, he married Lady Frances Stewart on 10 March 1799. Lady Frances was the eldest daughter of Robert Stewart, 1st Marquess of Londonderry and Frances Pratt (the daughter of the Whig politician Charles Pratt, 1st Earl Camden). Before her death in 1810, they had four children:

- George FitzRoy (1800–1882), British Army officer; he married, Louisa Harris, daughter of John Harris, in 1830. After her death, he married Hon. Charlotte Frances Bona Spencer, daughter of Lt.-Col. Hon. George Augustus Spencer (son of Francis Spencer, 1st Baron Churchill), in 1873.
- Frances FitzRoy (c. 1802–1878), who married George Rice-Trevor, 4th Baron Dynevor. They were grandparents of Thomas Pakenham, 5th Earl of Longford, and great-grandparents of Hugh Gough, 4th Viscount Gough and William Fletcher-Vane, 1st Baron Inglewood.
- Robert FitzRoy (1805–1865), a hydrographer who married Mary Henrietta O'Brien, daughter of Maj.-Gen. Edward James O'Brien, in 1836. After her death he married Maria Isabella, daughter of John Henry Smyth, of Heath Hall, in 1854.
- Emily Elizabeth FitzRoy (1808–1827), the FitzRoy's youngest daughter died at the age of 20.

FitzRoy died at his house in Berkeley Square, London in 1829 and was buried at Wicken, Northamptonshire.

=== Descendants ===
Through his son Robert, he was a grandfather of five: Emily-Unah FitzRoy, Frances "Fanny" FitzRoy, Katherine FitzRoy, Robert O'Brien FitzRoy, and Laura Maria Elizabeth FitzRoy.

Military offices
Preceded by Peter Hunter	Colonel-Commandant of the 4th Battalion, 60th Regiment of Foot; 1804–1805	Succeeded by Edward Morrison
Preceded by Patrick Tonyn	Colonel of the 48th (Northamptonshire); Regiment of Foot; 1805–1829	Succeeded by Sir Thomas Hislop
Parliament of Great Britain
Preceded by Sir Charles Davers, Bt; George FitzRoy	Member of Parliament for Bury St Edmunds; 1787–1796; With: Sir Charles Davers, Bt	Succeeded by Sir Charles Davers, Bt; Lord Hervey
Parliament of the United Kingdom
Preceded by Sir Charles Davers, Bt; Lord Hervey	Member of Parliament for Bury St Edmunds; 1802–1818; With: Lord Hervey 1802–1803; The Lord Templetown 1803–1812; Frederick Foster 1812–1818	Succeeded by Earl of Euston; Arthur Upton
