= Arthur Upton =

Anglo-Irish soldier and cricketer (1777–1855)

General The Honourable Arthur Upton CB
- Born: 13 June 1777
- Died: 22 January 1855 (aged 77)
- Military career
- Allegiance: United Kingdom
- Branch: British Army
- Service years: 1793–1855
- Rank: General
- Conflicts: French Revolutionary Wars; Flanders Campaign; Anglo-Russian Invasion of Holland; Napoleonic Wars; Walcheren Campaign; Peninsular War; Siege of Cádiz; Battle of San Millan-Osma; Battle of Vitoria; Battle of Tolosa; Battle of the Bidassoa; Battle of Nivelle; Battle of the Nive; Passage of the Adour; Battle of Bayonne
- Awards: Army Gold Medal

General Arthur Percy Upton CB (13 June 1777 – 22 January 1855) was an Anglo-Irish soldier, politician and amateur cricketer.

== Background ==
Upton was the third son of Clotworthy Upton, 1st Baron Templetown, by Elizabeth Boughton, daughter of Shuckburgh Boughton. John Upton, 1st Viscount Templetown, and the Honourable Fulke Howard were his brothers. He was educated at Westminster School and attended the Royal Military Academy in Berlin.

== Military career ==
He entered the British army in 1793 as an ensign in the Coldstream Guards and thereafter rose through the ranks as a lieutenant and captain in 1795, aide-de-camp to Sir Ralph Abercromby in 1799, major in the 13th Foot in 1807, lieutenant-colonel in the 7th West Indian regiment and the Grenadier Guards in 1807, brevet colonel in 1814, major-general in 1821, lieutenant-general in 1837 and full general on 11 November 1851. He was awarded CB on 4 June 1815.

He was Equerry to the Queen in 1810, aide-de-camp to the Duke of York in 1815 and equerry to the Duchess of Kent by 1835.

== Cricket career ==
Upton was an early member of Marylebone Cricket Club (MCC) who played several matches for its team. He played for the Gentlemen in the inaugural and second Gentlemen v Players matches in 1806. He took six catches in the first match, which the Gentlemen with given men won by an innings. Upton's career spanned the 1795 to 1808 seasons. He is known to have made 47 appearances in high-level matches. He was a useful batsman and a good fielder but seems to have bowled only rarely.

== Political career ==
Upton was a Member of Parliament (MP) for Bury St Edmunds from 1818 to 1826.

He died unmarried in 1855.

Parliament of the United Kingdom
Preceded by Frederick Foster; Lord Charles FitzRoy	Member of Parliament for Bury St Edmunds; 1818 – 1826; With: Earl of Euston 1818–1820; Lord John Edward FitzRoy 1820–1826	Succeeded by Earl of Euston; The Earl Jermyn
