= Templepatrick =

Village in County Antrim, Northern Ireland

Coordinates: 54.703°N 6.092°W

Templepatrick: Irish: Teampall Phádraig
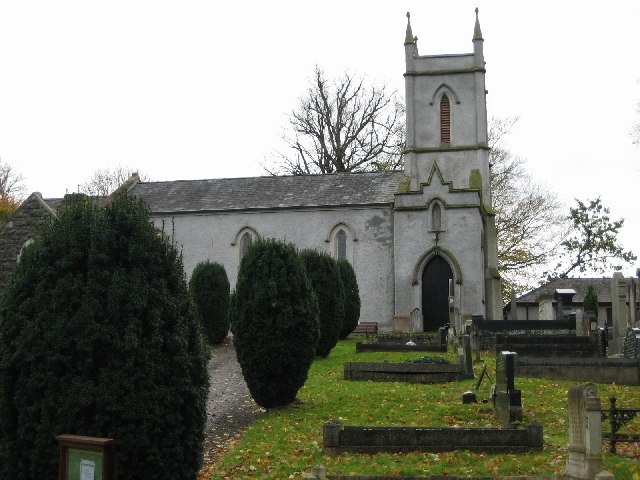
- St Patrick's Church, Templepatrick

- Location within Northern Ireland
- Population: 1,437 (2011 census)
- Irish grid reference: J264853
  - Belfast: 10 mi (16 km) SE
- District: Antrim
- County: County Antrim
- Country: Northern Ireland
- Sovereign state: United Kingdom
- Post town: BALLYCLARE
- Postcode district: BT39
- Dialling code: 028
- UK Parliament: South Antrim
- NI Assembly: South Antrim

Templepatrick (/ˌtɛmpəlˈpætrɪk/; from Irish Teampall Phádraig, meaning 'Patrick's Church') is a village and civil parish in County Antrim, Northern Ireland. It is 10 miles (16 km) northwest of Belfast, and halfway between the towns of Ballyclare and Antrim. It is also close to Belfast International Airport and the village has several hotels. Templepatrick is the site of historic Church of Ireland, Presbyterian and the Old Presbyterian Church. It had a population of 1,437 people in the 2011 census.

== Places of interest ==
One side of the main street in Templepatrick consists of the demesne wall of Castle Upton. A mock fortified gateway in the wall at the centre of the village leads to the castle itself. The core of the main house is a tower house with walls up to five feet thick, built in 1611 by Sir Robert Norton, but later bought in 1625 by Captain Henry Upton. The family mausoleum is in the care of the National Trust and is open to visitors.

The Templeton Hotel in the village was named after Lady Elizabeth Templetown, an aristocrat and writer who lived in Castle Upton in the 18th century. In 2020, the Templeton became The Rabbit Hotel.

The Patterson's Spade Mill, which is now a small industrial museum, is nearby. It is a National Trust property.

== History ==
=== The Troubles ===
On 9 November 1974, two Catholic civilians, Patrick Courtney (29) and William Tierney (31), were shot dead by the Protestant Action Force at their workplace, a garage, Clady Corner, near Templepatrick.

In June 1976, three Protestant civilians, Ruby Kidd (28), Francis Walker (17) and Joseph McBride (56), were shot dead during a Republican Action Force gun attack on The Store Bar, Lyle Hill Road, Templepatrick.

== Transport ==
Templepatrick railway station opened on 11 April 1848 and shut for passenger traffic on 21 February 1981.

== Demographics ==
=== 2011 census ===
In the 2011 census, Templepatrick had a population of 1,437 people (605 households).

=== 2001 census ===
As of the 2001 census, Templepatrick was classified as a village by the NI Statistics and Research Agency (NISRA) (i.e. with a population between 1,000 and 2,250 people). On census day in 2001 (29 April 2001), there were 1,556 people living in Templepatrick. Of these:

- 19.4% were aged under 16 years and 20.6% were aged 60 and over
- 50.1% of the population were male and 49.9% were female
- 12.3% were from a Catholic background and 82.7% were from a Protestant background
- 1.2% of people aged 16–74 were unemployed.

== Notable people ==
- James Hope (1764–1847), known as 'Jemmy Hope', United Irishman, Presbyterian and one of the first proto-Marxists in Irish history.
- Sir Robin Kinahan (1916–1997) and his son Danny Kinahan both politicians, of Castle Upton. Danny Kinahan is a cousin of Irish pop/rock star Chris De Burgh.
- Lavinia Loughridge (1930–2014), physician, was born in Templepatrick.

== See also ==
- List of civil parishes of County Antrim
- List of towns and villages in Northern Ireland
