= Castle Upton =

Castle in the United Kingdom

Coordinates: 54.704°N 6.091°W

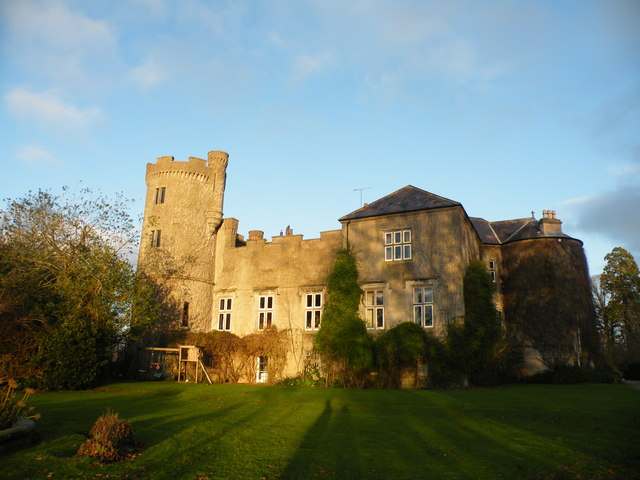
Castle Upton, plantation castle and country house.

Castle Upton is situated in the village of Templepatrick, in County Antrim, Northern Ireland. It is around 12 miles (19 km) north-west of Belfast. Originally the site of a 13th-century fortified priory of the Knights of St John, the present building was constructed around 1610 by the Norton family who settled here during the Plantation of Ulster. Soon after, it was bought by the Upton family, later the Viscounts Templetown, who remained in possession until the 20th century and whose family mausoleum is accessible to the public in the adjacent Templetown Old Burial Ground. The castle was remodelled in the 1780s to designs by the Scottish neoclassical architect Robert Adam, who also designed the stable block now known as 'Adam Yard'. Upton was purchased in 1963 by Sir Robin Kinahan and Coralie de Burgh, by which time it was in a poor state of repair. Following restoration the Adam Yard was converted to housing, and the castle later opened as a wedding venue.

== History ==
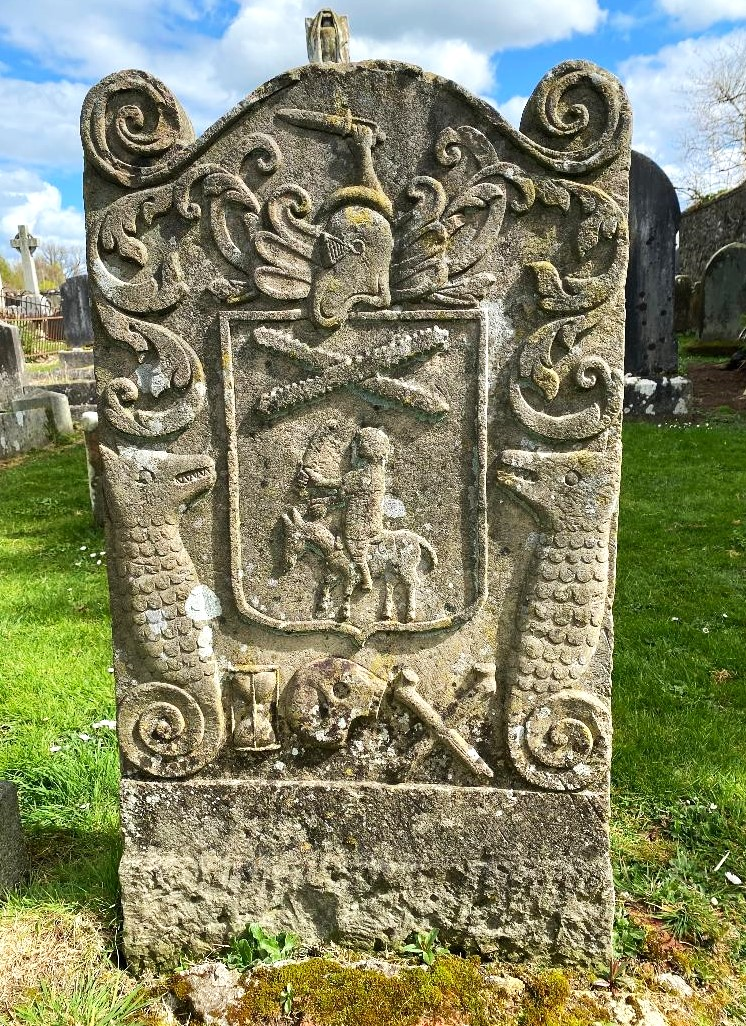
17th century grave marker in the former castle burial ground

It is sometimes stated that Castle Upton contains parts of the earlier priory buildings, but other sources conclude that no part of the building predates the work of the Norton family. Even the existence of a house of the Knights of St John at this site has been questioned, due to lack of evidence. Sir Robert Norton, an officer under Sir Arthur Chichester, Governor of Carrickfergus, obtained lands along the Six Mile Water, and started work on the castle in the late 16th century, building what is now the east wing. This work was completed by Sir Humphrey Norton in the first part of the 17th century, and like many castles of the Plantation period was surrounded by a bawn wall.

The castle was purchased in 1625 by Captain Henry Upton, who had served under the Earl of Essex, and was renamed for his own family. Upton became Member of Parliament for Carrickfergus in 1634, and several of his descendants served as Members for Carrickfergus and for County Antrim. The family supported the Protestant William III in the war against the Catholic James II. In 1776, Clotworthy Upton (1721–1785) was created Baron Templetown after serving in the household of Princess Augusta, dowager Princess of Wales. Lord Templetown commissioned Scottish architect Robert Adam to remodel Castle Upton in a castellated style. Although Adam never visited Ireland his scheme was mostly carried out, including alterations to the roof line and the addition of the north wing. Adam also designed a mausoleum and a stable block, comprising a double courtyard to the north-east of the house. This was completed in 1789, after John Upton had succeeded his father as 2nd Baron Templetown. He sat in the British House of Commons from 1802 to 1812 as one of two representatives for Bury St Edmunds, and in 1806 he was created Viscount Templetown. His successor Henry Montagu Upton, 2nd Viscount Templetown (1799–1863), commissioned Edward Blore to remodel the house in 1837.

During the first half of the 20th century, Castle Upton was sold by the Upton family. The Adam alterations to the roof were removed, and the Adam wing fell into disrepair. In 1963 the semi-ruined house was purchased by Sir Robin Kinahan, a prominent businessman and former Lord Mayor of Belfast, for £53,000. His wife, the artist Coralie de Burgh, guided the restoration of Castle Upton over the succeeding years. Improvements were continued by their son, Danny Kinahan and his wife Anna, who later opened the castle as a wedding venue. In 2016 the Kinahans placed Castle Upton on the market for £1.35m.

== Architecture ==
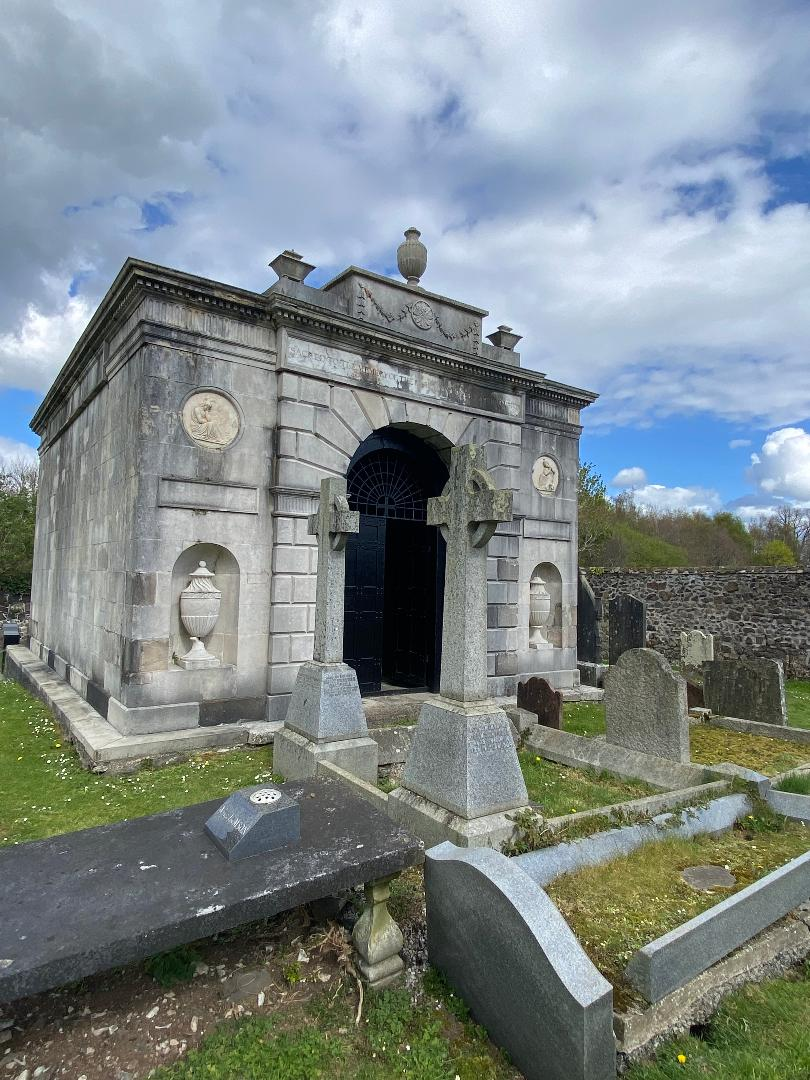
Templetown Mausoleum, National Trust property.

One section of the castle, the wrecked Adam wing, was later reconstructed. This wing, now contains a ballroom in which an Italian, marble chimney has been added. The owners of this castle obtained this chimney from Downhill Castle in County Londonderry. The stable block was built from architectural copies of the now demolished old Fish Market of Leith, near Edinburgh, Scotland.

== Templepatrick burial ground ==
The adjacent graveyard contains the Upon family Templetown Mausoleum. Built in 1789 to the design of Robert Adam, it commemorates among others, George Upton, 3rd Viscount Templeton, Crimean War veteran, MP, and "Gold Stick in Waiting" to Queen Victoria.

The Ascendancy family shares the burial ground with the remains of William Orr, the United Irishmen whose execution was invoked in the rebel cry "Remember Orr" during the Battle of Antrim in 1798, and the Geneva-educated preacher Josias Welsh, grandson of John Knox, the Scottish Reformer.
