= King George (1784 EIC ship) =

History
- Name: King George
- Namesake: George III of Great Britain
- Owner: 1784:Henry Hinde Pelly; 1798:Blight & Co.; 1800:J. Cundall
- Builder: Perry, Blackwall
- Launched: 1784
- Fate: Destroyed in an explosion in July 1800

General characteristics
- Tons burthen: 755, or 776, or 83/94, or 800(bm)
- Length: 143 ft 2 in (43.6 m) (overall); 116 ft 2 in (35.4 m) (keel)
- Beam: 35 ft 5 1/2 in (10.8 m)
- Depth of hold: 14 ft 9 in (4.5 m)
- Propulsion: Sail
- Complement: 1793:99; 1795:80
- Armament: 1793:26 × 12&6-pounder guns + 9 swivel guns; 1795::26 × 12&6-pounder guns; 1800:14 × 9-pounder guns
- Notes: Three decks

King George was launched in 1784 and made six voyages for the British East India Company (EIC) between 1785 and 1798. She also participated in the invasion of St Lucia. In 1798 her owners sold her and she became a West Indiaman. An accident in 1800 at Jamaica destroyed her.

== Career ==
EIC voyage #1 (1785–1786): Captain Jonathan Court sailed from the Downs on 11 February 1785, bound for Bombay and Bengal. King George reached Johanna on 28 May and Bombay on 17 June. She arrived at Diamond Creek on 18 August. Homeward bound, she reached St Helena on 8 April 1786 and arrived at the Downs on 17 June.

EIC voyage #2 (1786–1787): Captain George Millet (or Millett), sailed from the Downs on 21 November 1786 bound for Bombay and China. King George reached Cochin on 23 April 1787 and Bombay on 6 May. She arrived at Whampoa Anchorage on 9 September. Homeward bound, she crossed the Second Bar on 4 January, reached st Helena on 5 April, and arrived at the Downs on 22 June.

EIC voyage #3 (1789–1790): Captain John Sherwood sailed from the Downs on 14 April 1789, bound for China. King George arrived at Whampoa Anchorage on 30 August. Homeward bound, she crossed the Second Bar on 24 November, reached St Helena on 24 February 1790, and arrived at the downs on 28 April.

EIC voyage #4 (1792–1793): Captain Richard Colnett sailed from the Downs on 2 May 1792, bound for Madras and Bengal. King George reached Madras on 17 September and arrive at Diamond Harbour on 7 October. Homeward bound, she was at "Broken Ground" on 19 February 1793, Madras on 19 April, and St Helena on 31 July. She arrived at the Downs on 27 September. Shortly before she returned, the EIC acquired a letter of marque on 2 September 1793 for Colnett.

EIC voyage #5 (1794–1795): The British government held King George at Portsmouth, together with a number of other Indiamen in anticipation of using them as transports for an attack on Île de France (Mauritius). It gave up the plan and released the vessels in May 1794. It paid £458 8s 8d for having delayed her departure by 22 days.

Captain Colnett sailed from Portsmouth on 2 May, bound for China. King George reached Anger on 7 September and arrived at Whampoa Anchorage on 6 October. Homeward bound, she crossed the Second Bar on 5 January 1795, reached St Helena on 14 April, and arrived at the Downs on 23 July.

West Indies Expedition: On 20 October 1795 the Admiralty chartered King George as a troopship for Admiral Hugh Cloberry Christian's expedition to the West Indies. Her captain was John Fam Timins, who had acquired a letter of marque on 12 September 1795. She sailed for the West Indies on 9 December, but bad weather delayed the start of the expedition and the vessels had to put back to England. After numerous false starts aborted by weather issues, the fleet sailed on 26 April to invade St Lucia, with troops under Lieutenant-General Sir Ralph Abercromby. St Lucia surrendered to the British on 25 May. The British went on to capture Saint Vincent and Grenada. (Note: In 1818 Timins purchased Hilfield Castle.)

EIC voyage #6 (1797–1798): Captain Colnett sailed from Portsmouth on 6 April 1797, bound for Madras and Bengal. King George arrived at Madras on 27 July. Homeward bound, perhaps from Bengal, she arrived at the Cape of Good Hope on 24 December.

While King George was at the Cape, officers and crew went ashore. While Colnett was on shore, his second mate, Mr. Reid assaulted him. A subsequent court-martial on HMS Stately sentenced Reid to two years in the Marshalsea prison. Because Colnett had a letter of marque, King George was a "Private man-of-war", and the Navy's Articles of War applied at sea. Had Reid struck Colnett aboard King George, the charge would have been mutiny, for which the penalty would have been death.

From the Cape King George reached St Helena on 3 February 1798 and Cork on 24 June. She arrived at the Downs on 7 July.

West Indiaman: In 1798 her owners sold King George and her new owners employed her in trade with Jamaica. She underwent a good repair that year. She appears in Lloyd's Register with Cundall, master, and Blight & Co., owners. The Register of Shipping for 1800 shows J. Cundall as master and owner, and her trade still as London—Jamaica.

== Fate ==
King George sailed from Jamaica on 7 July 1800 in a convoy for London. She had a cargo of 400 pipes of Madeira wine and was also carrying a number of invalided soldiers. She ran aground on Pedro Point, Jamaica, before she had even cleared the island. As she fired guns to signal her distress, the fire communicated itself to her magazine. She blew up, killing the majority of those on board. Lloyd's List reported that her master was Eilbeck, and that her people were saved.
