= George Upton, 3rd Viscount Templetown =

Irish soldier and politician

General The Right Honourable The Viscount Templetown GCB
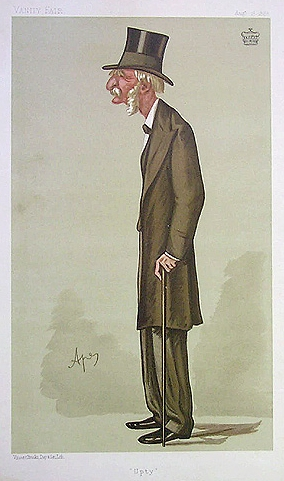
- Viscount Templetown caricatured by Carlo Pellegrini (Ape) for Vanity Fair in 1888
- Born: 5 August 1802
- Died: 4 January 1890 (aged 87)
- Military career
- Allegiance: United Kingdom
- Branch: British Army
- Rank: General
- Commands: Western District; Southern District
- Conflicts: Crimean War
- Awards: GCB

Arms of Upton, Viscount Templetown: Sable, a cross moline or These are a differenced version of the arms of Upton of Upton in Cornwall, later of Lupton, Brixham in Devon

General George Frederick Upton, 3rd Viscount Templetown, GCB (5 August 1802 – 4 January 1890), styled The Honourable George Upton until 1863, was an Irish soldier and politician.

== Military career ==
Upton was the second son of John Upton, 1st Viscount Templetown of Botleys, Surrey and Lady Mary Montagu, daughter of John Montagu, 5th Earl of Sandwich

He joined the British Army in 1823 and was promoted lieutenant in 1825, captain in 1826, major in 1837, and lieutenant-colonel in 1841, all in the 62nd Foot, with the exception of the period 13 February 1827 to 8 June 1830 when serving as a Captain with 60th rifles.

In 1842 he transferred to be captain and lieutenant-colonel in the Coldstream Guards. He was a major and brevet colonel in command of 1st Battalion in the Crimea in 1854–55, taking part in the Battles of the Alma and Inkerman and was made CB in 1855 and major general in 1858. He was made a commander of the Legion of Honour in 1856 and awarded the Order of the Medjidie (fourth class) in 1858.

In 1859 he was returned to parliament for County Antrim, a seat he held until 1863, when he succeeded his childless elder brother in the viscountcy. In 1866 he was elected an Irish representative peer.

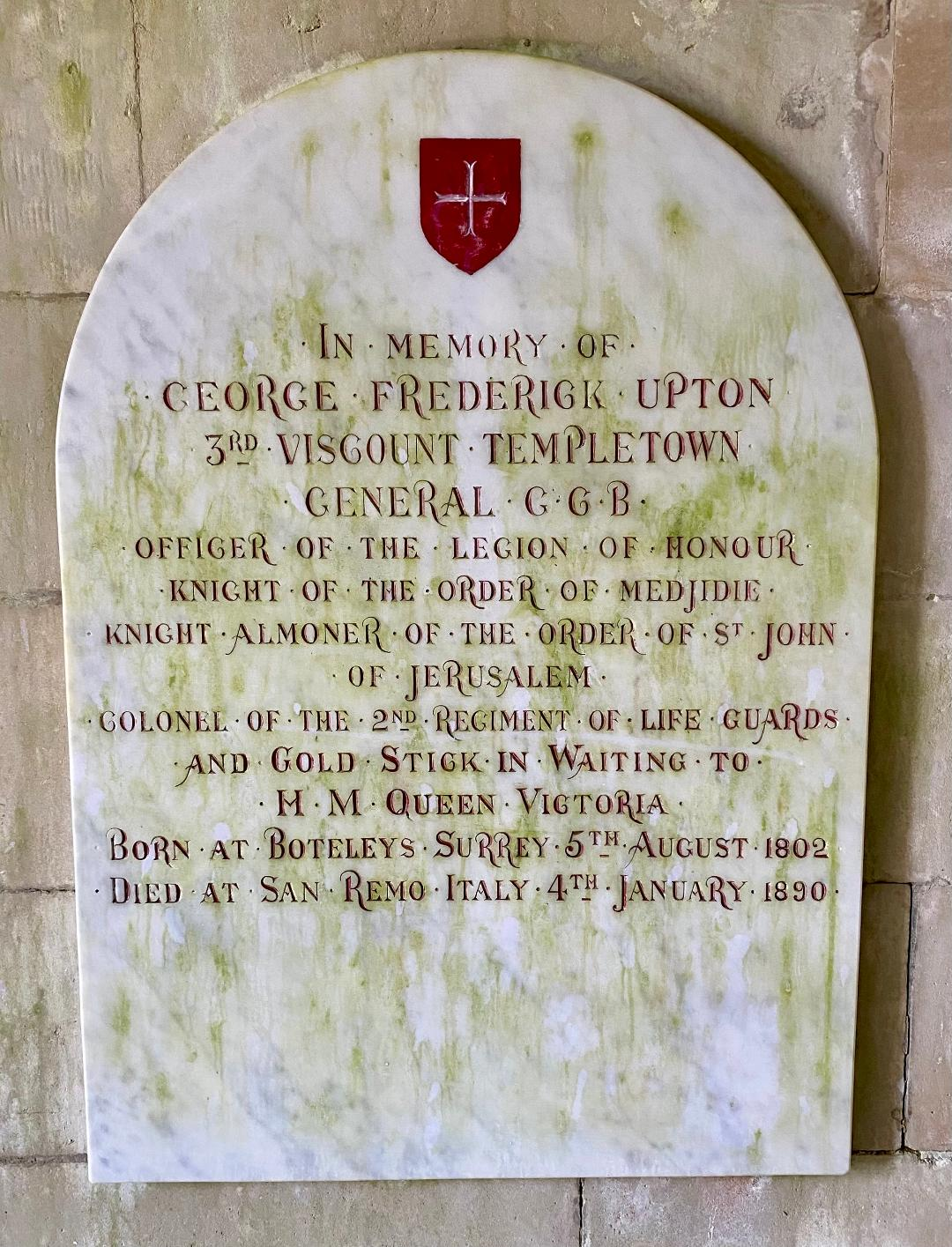
George Upton memorial, Templetown Mausoleum

Promoted lieutenant-general, he became general officer commanding Western District at Devonport in January 1865 and general officer commanding Southern District at Portsmouth in August 1870.

He was briefly colonel of the 90th Foot in 1862 before transferring to be colonel of 2nd Battalion, 60th Rifles from 1862 to 1876 and then the 2nd Life Guards from 1876 until his death in 1890. He was elevated to KCB in 1869 and promoted full general on 6 April 1873. He was further elevated to GCB in 1886.

Lord Templetown died in January 1890, aged 87, and was interred in the Templeton Mausoleum in the Old Templepatrick Burial Ground, next to the family seat at Castle Upton, County Antrim. He had married Susan Woodford, the daughter of Field Marshal Sir Alexander Woodford GCB and was succeeded in the viscountcy by his nephew, Henry, son of his younger brother Edward John Upton.

Military offices
Preceded by William Hutchinson	GOC Western District; 1865–1866	Succeeded by Sir Augustus Spencer
Preceded by Sir George Buller	GOC Southern District; 1870–1874	Succeeded by Sir Charles Hastings Doyle
Parliament of the United Kingdom
Preceded by George Hume Macartney; Thomas Henry Pakenham	Member of Parliament for County Antrim; 1859–1863; With: Thomas Henry Pakenham	Succeeded by Thomas Henry Pakenham; Hon. Edward O'Neill
Peerage of Ireland
Preceded by Henry Montagu Upton	Viscount Templetown; 1863–1890	Succeeded by Henry Upton
Political offices
Preceded by The Earl of Lanesborough	Representative peer for Ireland; 1866–1890	Succeeded by The Lord Kilmaine
