= Clotworthy Upton (Royal Navy officer) =

Royal Navy officer (1768–1822)

Captain Clotworthy Upton
- Born: 1768
- Died: 1822 (aged 53–54) At sea
- Buried: At sea
- Allegiance: Kingdom of Great Britain; United Kingdom
- Branch: Royal Navy
- Conflicts: First Battle of Copenhagen; Second Battle of Copenhagen

Clotworthy Upton (1768–1822) was an officer in the Royal Navy who served during the French Revolutionary and Napoleonic Wars. He was the illegitimate son of Clotworthy Upton, 1st Baron Templetown. Upton joined the service at the age of eleven, as a captain's servant aboard HMS Alexander. Despite passing his lieutenant's examination in 1790, he could not obtain a position in the Royal Navy and sought employment in the merchant fleet in 1791. Upton returned to military service in January 1801, when he was appointed Master and Commander of HMS Zephyr. It was in her that Upton fought at the Battle of Copenhagen in 1801.

During the Peace of Amiens, Upton was promoted to Post Captain and in December 1804, following the restoration of war with France in May 1803, was given command of HMS Lapwing. In 1807, he took part in the second battle of Copenhagen, aboard HMS Sybille, which he commanded until 1813. He then commissioned HMS Junon for the war in North America. In 1818, Upton was appointed commissioner of the Royal Navy dockyard in Trincomalee. He died on the way home in 1822, having fallen ill, and was buried at sea.

== Early life and career ==
Clotworthy Upton was born in 1768, the illegitimate son of Clotworthy Upton, 1st Baron Templetown, and his eventual wife, Elizabeth Boughton. At the age of eleven, he joined the Royal Navy as servant to captain Richard Kempenfelt, aboard HMS Alexander. He passed his lieutenant's examination in 1790 but was unable to find employment within the service, and between 1791 - 1794 worked on merchant ships travelling to and from the Eastern World. One such journey, in 1792, was to Madras aboard the King George.

== Command ==
In January 1801, Upton returned to the Royal Navy as Master and Commander of HMS Zephyr. She had been fitted as a fireship was sent to the Baltic with a large force, under Admiral Sir Hyde Parker, to disrupt the league of armed neutrality. Because of the shoal waters around Copenhagen, Parker's larger ships were unable to get close enough to engage the anchored Danish fleet but Zephyr joined Horatio Nelson's squadron and was at the Battle of Copenhagen on 2 April. Zephyr was in a squadron of sloops and frigates, under the command of Edward Riou, that attacked the Danish vessels near the harbour mouth. Riou's force took heavy fire from the Trekroner batteries and withdrew when Parker gave the signal.

In celebration of the Peace of Amiens, a number of officers were given promotions, and Upton received the rank of Post Captain. Hostilities resumed in May 1803 and, in December 1804, Upton was given command on the 28-gun sixth-rate frigate, HMS Lapwing. In December 1805, he moved to HMS Camilla of 20 guns, then in March 1806, to HMS Aimable of 32 guns, in the North Sea. HMS Sybille in which Upton served from 1807 to 1813, was his longest command. In her, he took part in the second battle of Copenhagen. On 25 January 1808, Upton's Sibylle captured the 4-gun French privateer Grand Argus and on 16 August, the 16-gun brig-corvette Espiegle. In 1810, she took the 14-gun brig, Edouard.

Upton took command of HMS Junon in North America, in September 1813, and sailed in her for the Halifax Station. On 3 April 1814, while cruising with HMS Tenedos, Junon chased the USS Constitution into Marblehead, Massachusetts. The captain of Tenedos, Hyde Parker, wanted to follow but Upton ordered him to abandon the pursuit.

Upton's last command at sea was HMS Royal Oak which he joined in 1815, shortly before she was laid up in ordinary at Portsmouth. In 1818, Upton took the position of commissioner at the Royal Navy dockyard in Trincomalee.

== Personal life ==
Despite the marriage of his parents a year after his birth, Upton's illegitimacy could not be revoked and he was deprived of any legal claim on the family estate. He did however inherit from his father, who prior to his death in 1785, had set up a trust for all his children. Upton did not receive the family barony though, which passed to his brother John, the eldest surviving of the couple's three legitimate offspring.

Upton was married in 1805, at St Pancras Old Church, London, to Elizabeth Walton, whose father was a wealthy American merchant. They had one child, a daughter, Eliza Mary, who went on to marry a Scottish lord.

Upton died and was buried at sea, in 1822. He was on his way home from his appointment in Trincomalee where cholera had taken its toll on his fellow officers.
