= Fulk Greville Howard =

English politician

The Honourable Fulk Howard FRS
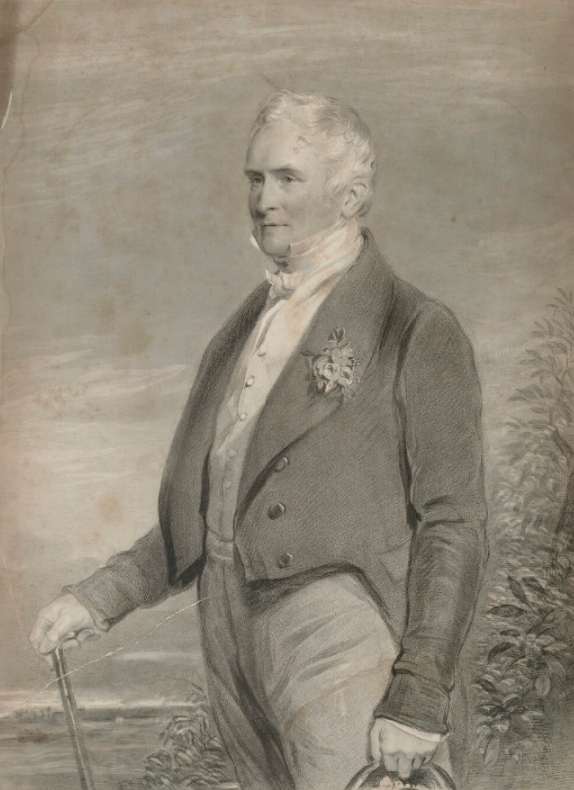
- Born: Fulk Greville Upton; 3 April 1773; Geneva
- Died: 4 March 1846 (aged 72)
- Education: Westminster School; Christ Church, Oxford; Royal Military Academy, Berlin
- Spouse: Mary Howard (m. 1807)
- Military career
- Allegiance: United Kingdom
- Branch: British Army
- Service years: 1793–1825
- Rank: Colonel
- Conflicts: French Revolutionary Wars; Flanders campaign; Anglo-Russian Invasion of Holland

Member of Parliament for Castle Rising
- In office 1808–1832

Colonel Fulk Greville Howard FRS (né Upton; 3 April 1773 – 4 March 1846) was an English politician. He adopted the name Howard in 1807 upon marrying the heiress of Elford Hall, Staffordshire and Castle Rising, Norfolk.

== Early life and education ==
Howard was born at Geneva, the younger son of Clotworthy Upton, 1st Baron Templetown, of Temple Patrick, County Antrim, and educated at Westminster School (1786–1791), Christ Church, Oxford 1791 and the Military Academy in Berlin.

== Career ==
Howard joined the Army and was an ensign in the 1st Foot Guards (1793), lieutenant and captain (1794), captain and lieutenant-colonel (1804), lieutenant-colonel of the 7th West India Regiment (1807). Reduced to half-pay, he commanded the Irish 9th garrison battalion (July 1807), was brevet colonel in 1813 and fully retired in 1825. He took part in the Anglo-Russian invasion of Holland during the French Revolutionary Wars in 1799, losing the sight of one eye in the Helder Expedition.

He was a Member (MP) of the Parliament of the United Kingdom for Castle Rising from 29 January 1808 to 1832.

He was elected a Fellow of the Royal Society in 1803.

== Marriage ==
On 7 July 1807, at St James's Church, Piccadilly, Upton married Mary Howard, the daughter and heiress of Frances Howard, the only surviving child of William Howard, Viscount Andover, of Elford Hall, Staffordshire; Ashtead Park, Surrey; and Castle Rising, Norfolk; and Richard Howard (formerly Bagot), son of Sir Walter Bagot, 5th Baronet. He formally took his wife's surname on 6 August 1807.

In 1818, his wife inherited the majority of her parents' estates worth nearly £350,000 (equivalent to £25,923,000 in 2025). They had no children and after her death in 1877 aged 92, the Howard estates were therefore dispersed among Howard and Bagot relatives.
