= Clotworthy Upton, 1st Baron Templetown =

Anglo-Irish courtier and peer

Arms of Upton, Viscount Templetown: Sable, a cross moline or These are a differenced version of the arms of Upton of Upton in Cornwall, later of Lupton, Brixham in Devon

Clotworthy Upton, 1st Baron Templetown (14 March 1721 – 16 April 1785) was an Anglo-Irish courtier and peer.

He was the youngest son of Lieutenant Colonel John Upton, of Castle Upton, County Antrim, by his wife Mary Upton, only daughter of Dr Francis Upton. He served as Clerk Comptroller to Augusta, Dowager Princess of Wales between 1761 and 1772. In 1768 he succeeded to the family estates following the deaths of both of his brothers. On 3 August 1776 he was created Baron Templetown, of Templetown in the County of Antrim in the Peerage of Ireland, and assumed his seat in the Irish House of Lords.

== Marriage and succession ==
He married Elizabeth Boughton, a Lady of the Bedchamber to the Princess Amelia, on 25 August 1769. He was succeeded in his title by his eldest legitimate son, John Upton, who was created Viscount Templetown in 1806.

Peerage of Ireland
New creation	Baron Templetown; 1776–1785	Succeeded by John Upton
