= Peter Delmé =

Peter Delmé may refer to:

- Peter Delmé (banker) (died 1728), British merchant and banker
- Peter Delmé (MP for Southampton) (1710–1770), also MP for Ludgershall
- Peter Delmé (MP for Morpeth) (1748–1789)
