= Anne Liddell =

Anne Liddell may refer to:

- Ann Liddell (c. 1686 – 1735 or later), British political commentator
- Anne FitzPatrick (née Liddell, c. 1738–1804), first wife of Augustus FitzRoy, 3rd Duke of Grafton
