= Lord John FitzRoy =

British politician (1785-1856)

John Edward FitzRoy

Member of Parliament for Thetford
- In office 1812–1818 Serving with Thomas Creevey
- Preceded by: Lord William FitzRoy; Thomas Creevey
- Succeeded by: Lord Charles FitzRoy; Nicholas Ridley-Colborne

Member of Parliament for Bury St Edmunds
- In office 1820–1826 Serving with Arthur Upton
- Preceded by: The Earl of Euston; Arthur Upton
- Succeeded by: Earl Jermyn; The Earl of Euston

Personal details
- Born: 24 September 1785
- Died: 28 December 1856 (aged 71)
- Party: Whig
- Parents: Augustus FitzRoy (father); Elizabeth Wrottesley (mother)
- Relatives: Augustus FitzRoy (paternal grandfather); Richard Wrottesley (maternal grandfather); George FitzRoy (half-brother); Charles FitzRoy (half-brother); William FitzRoy (brother)
- Education: Harrow School
- Alma mater: Trinity College, Cambridge

Lord John Edward FitzRoy (24 September 1785 – 28 December 1856), was a British politician.

== Background and education ==
FitzRoy was the sixth son of Augustus FitzRoy, 3rd Duke of Grafton, Prime Minister of Great Britain, by his second wife Elizabeth Wrottesley, daughter of the Very Reverend Sir Richard Wrottesley, 7th Baronet, Dean of Worcester. He was the half-brother of George FitzRoy, 4th Duke of Grafton, and Lord Charles FitzRoy and the full brother of Admiral Lord William FitzRoy. He was educated at Harrow and Trinity College, Cambridge.

== Public life ==
FitzRoy was returned to Parliament for Thetford in 1812 (succeeding his brother Lord William), a seat controlled by the FitzRoy family, and was a supporter of the Whig opposition. He was not re-elected in 1818 but returned to the House of Commons in 1820 as one of two representatives for Bury St Edmunds (succeeding his nephew Lord Euston), another seat controlled by the family. He continued to represent the constituency until 1826.

== Personal life ==
FitzRoy never married. He died in December 1856, aged 71.

Parliament of the United Kingdom
Preceded by Lord William FitzRoy; Thomas Creevey	Member of Parliament for Thetford; 1812–1818; With: Thomas Creevey	Succeeded by Lord Charles FitzRoy; Nicholas Ridley-Colborne
Preceded by The Earl of Euston; Hon. Arthur Upton	Member of Parliament for Bury St Edmunds; 1820–1826; With: Hon. Arthur Upton	Succeeded by Earl Jermyn; The Earl of Euston
