= Elizabeth FitzRoy, Duchess of Grafton =

British duchess (1745–1822)

Her Grace The Duchess of Grafton
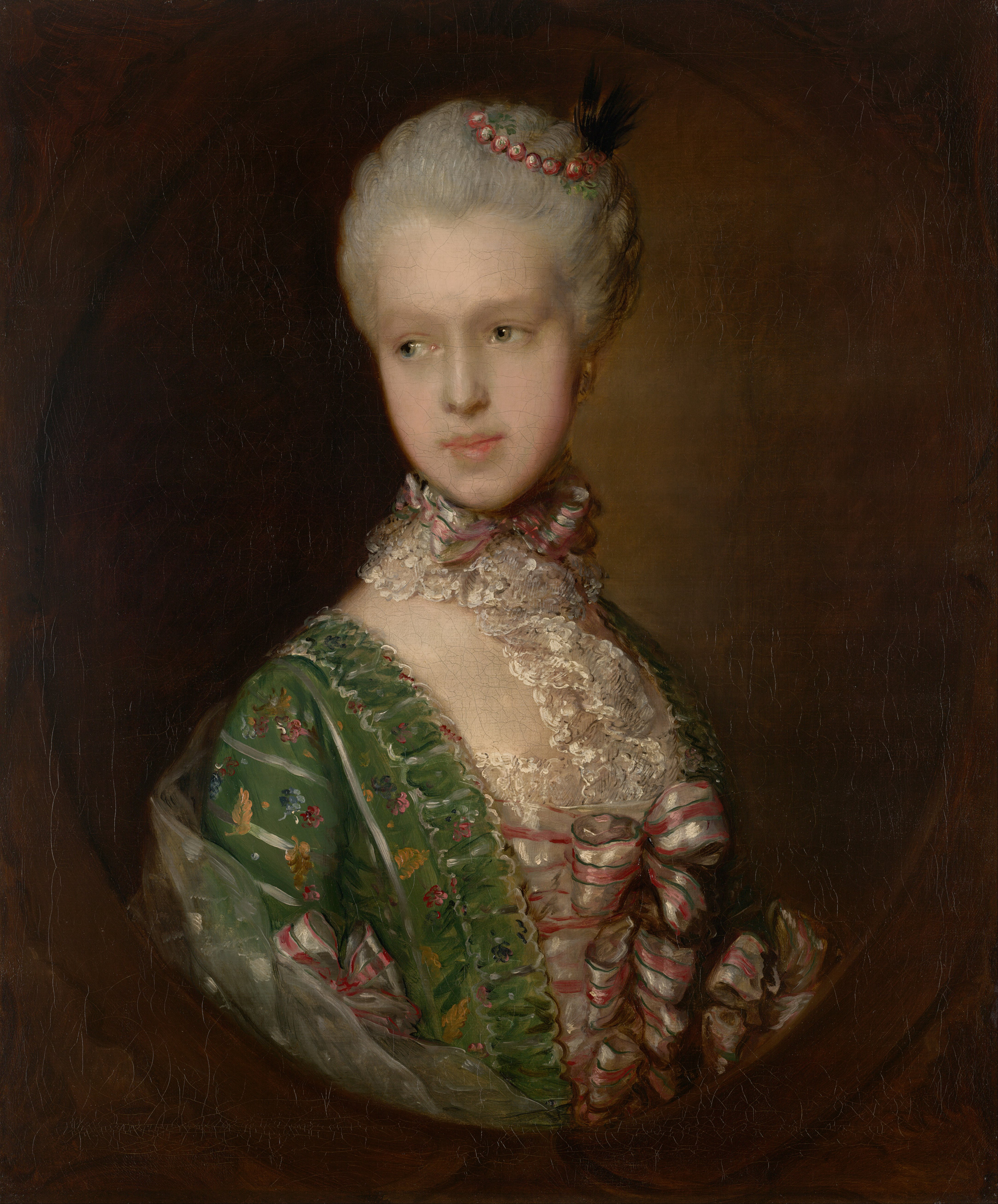
- Portrait of Elizabeth Wrottesley painted by Thomas Gainsborough, c. 1764–65
- Born: Elizabeth Wrottesley; 1 November 1745
- Died: 25 May 1822 (aged 76)
- Known for: Spouse of the prime minister of Great Britain (1769–1770)
- Spouse: Augustus FitzRoy, 3rd Duke of Grafton (m. 1769; died 1811)
- Children: 13, including William and John
- Father: Sir Richard Wrottesley, 7th Baronet

Elizabeth FitzRoy, Duchess of Grafton (née Wrottesley; 1 November 1745 – 25 May 1822) was the second wife of Augustus FitzRoy, 3rd Duke of Grafton (sometime duke and prime minister). They married on 24 June 1769 at Woburn Abbey in Bedfordshire, England, three months after his divorce.

Wrottesley was the daughter of Sir Richard Wrottesley, 7th Baronet and Lady Mary Leveson-Gower. Her uncle was the Duke of Bedford, who introduced her to Thomas Gainsborough; Gainsborough painted her portrait which now hangs in the National Gallery of Victoria in Melbourne.

== Family ==
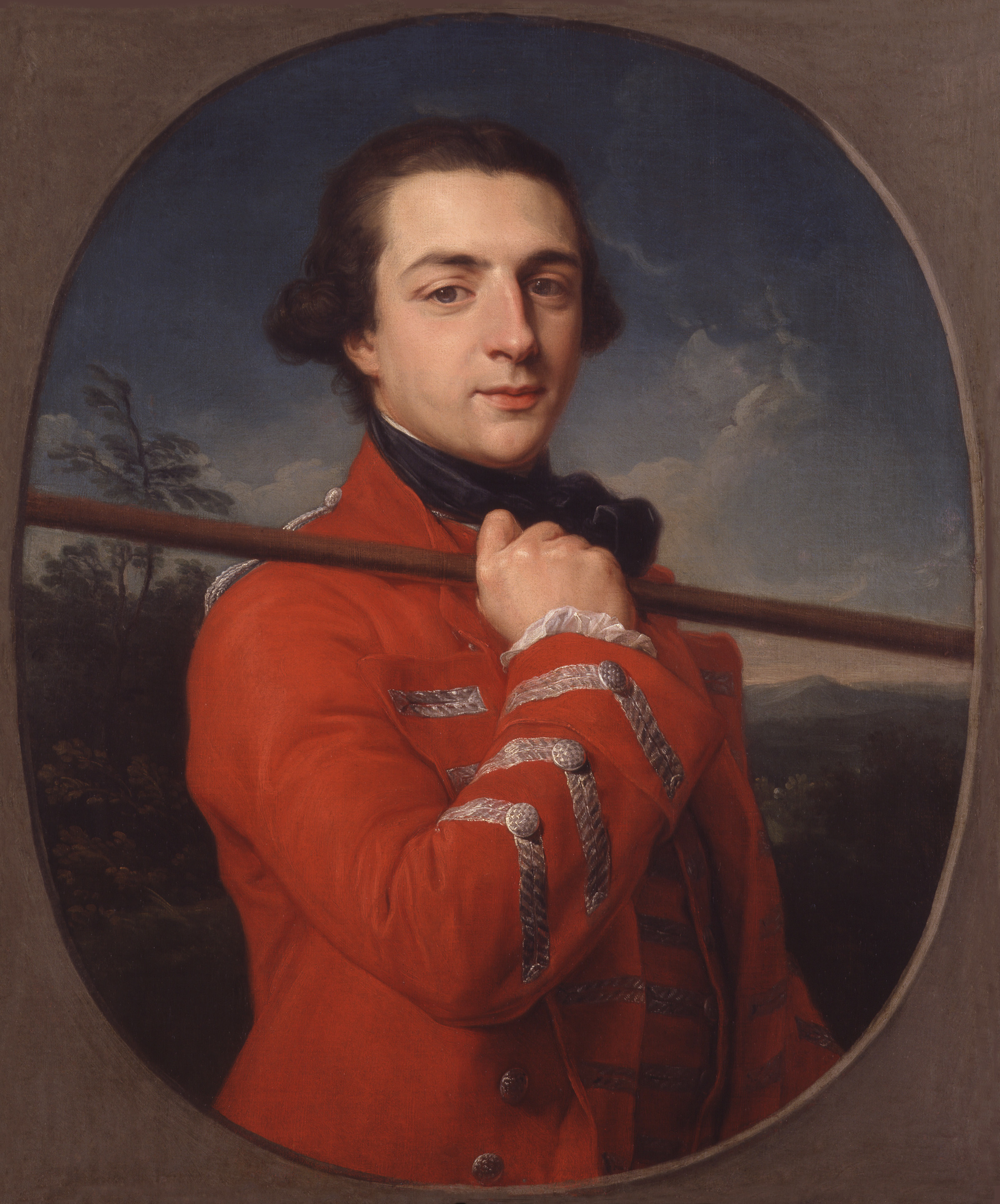
Portrait of the Duke of Grafton by Pompeo Batoni, 1762.

Wrottesley had thirteen children of whom nine survived:

- Lord Henry FitzRoy (9 April 1770 – 7 June 1828), clergyman; he married Caroline Pigot (died 1 January 1835) on 10 September 1800 and had five children. Ancestor of Daisy Greville, Countess of Warwick.
- Lady Charlotte FitzRoy (c. 1771 – 23 June 1857)
- Lord Frederick FitzRoy (born 16 September 1774; died young).
- Lady Augusta FitzRoy (1779 – 29 June 1839), who married Rev. George F. Tavel (died 1829) on 19 November 1811.
- Lady Frances FitzRoy (1 June 1780 – 7 January 1866), who married the 1st Baron Churchill on 25 November 1800.
- Admiral Lord William FitzRoy (1 June 1782 – 13 May 1857), who married Georgiana Raikes (died 2 December 1861) in 1816 and had two children.
- Lord John Edward FitzRoy (24 September 1785 – 28 December 1856), MP, died unmarried.
- Lady Isabella FitzRoy (c. 1786 – 10 December 1866), who married Barrington Pope Blachford (3 December 1783 – 14 May 1816) on 11 August 1812.
- Lady Elizabeth FitzRoy (died 13 March 1839), who married her cousin Lt. Gen. The Hon. William FitzRoy (1773 – 1837), son of the 1st Baron Southampton, on 4 July 1811.
