= Almeric FitzRoy =

British civil servant

Sir Almeric William FitzRoy KCB, KCVO (12 November 1851 – 31 May 1935) was a British civil servant.

FitzRoy was the son of Francis Horatio FitzRoy (1823–1900), the grandson of Rear Admiral Lord William FitzRoy and the great-grandson of Augustus FitzRoy, 3rd Duke of Grafton.

He was Clerk of the Privy Council between 9 August 1898 and May 1923.

FitzRoy was invested as a Commander of the Royal Victorian Order (CVO) by King Edward VII at Buckingham Palace on 11 August 1902, and later promoted to a Knight Commander (KCVO) of the Order in 1909.

Government offices
Preceded by Sir Charles Lennox Peel	Clerk of the Privy Council; 1898–1923	Succeeded by Sir Maurice Hankey
