= Anne Parsons =

Courtesan and political mistress

Anne Maynard
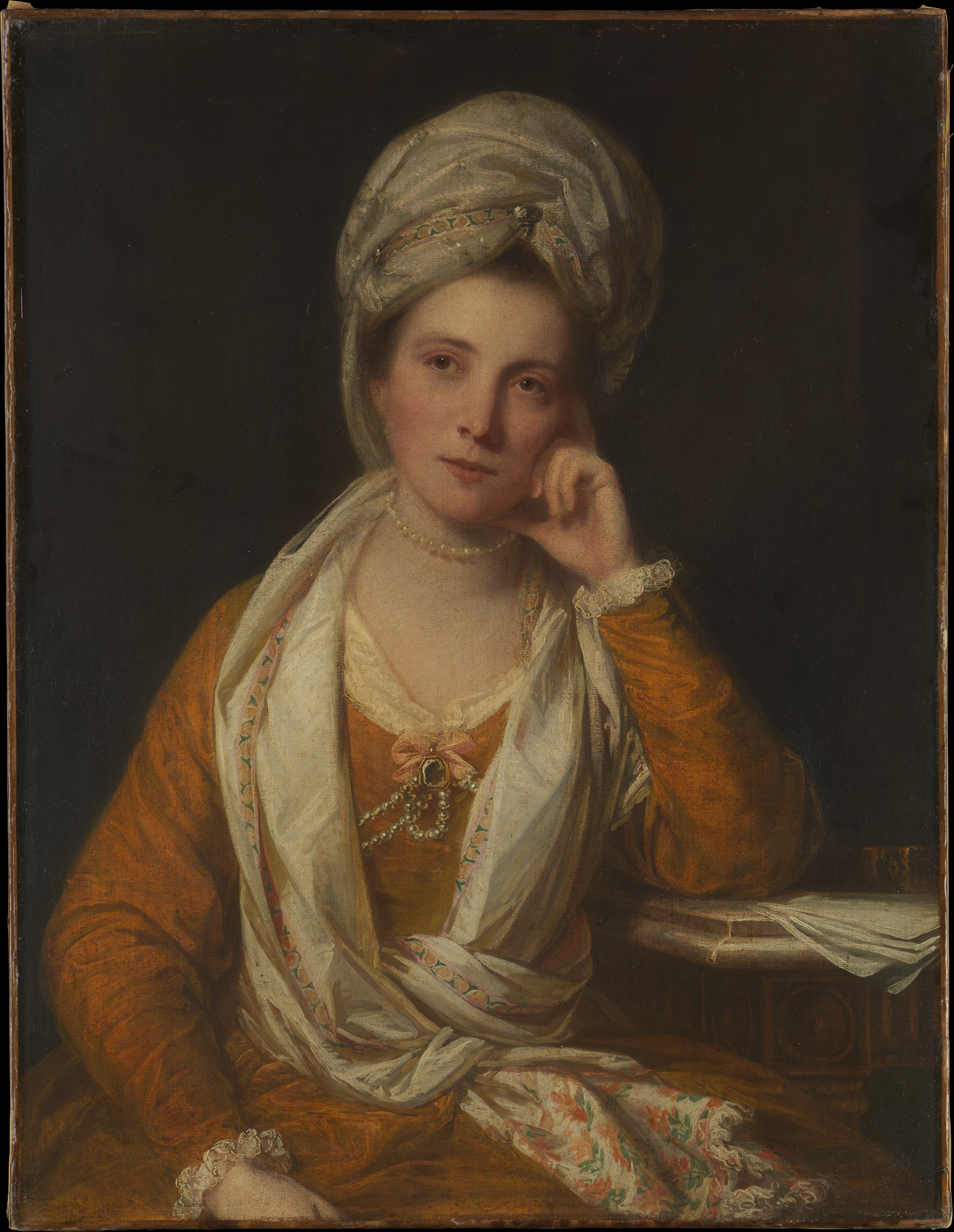
- Portrait by Joshua Reynolds
- Born: Anne Parsons c. 1735
- Died: 1814/5; Paris, France
- Other names: Nancy Parsons; Mrs Horton
- Known for: Successful courtesan
- Spouse: Charles Maynard, 2nd Viscount Maynard
- Partners: William Petty, 2nd Earl of Shelburne; Arnold Nesbitt; Richard Rigby; Augustus FitzRoy, 3rd Duke of Grafton; John Sackville, 3rd Duke of Dorset; Francis Russell, 5th Duke of Bedford

Anne, Viscountess Maynard (also known as Anne Parsons, Nancy Parsons, Nancy Maynard, and Mrs Horton (c. 1735 – 1814/1815) was a British courtesan and political mistress. She was de facto first lady, entertaining guests for her lover, Augustus FitzRoy, 3rd Duke of Grafton, the First Minister (Prime Minister).

== Life ==
Her birth is estimated to be 1735 and one account says that her father was a tailor in Bond Street in London. She is thought to have first been a prostitute. She is said to have gone to Jamaica with a man called Horton or Houghton, and according to some accounts they married and he may have died. When she returned she used a married name of "Mrs. Horton".

In 1760 she was a high-class prostitute to members of the aristocracy including the Earl of Shelburne, a contractor Arnold Nesbitt, and Richard Rigby, a Privy Councilor.

In the Autumn of 1763, she had a scandalous affair with Augustus FitzRoy, 3rd Duke of Grafton, whilst his wife, Anne FitzPatrick, was pregnant. FitzRoy kept Parsons at his townhouse and took her to the opera. This brazen defiance of convention offended society's standards. Parsons lived openly on the Duke's estates, and meanwhile, the Duke became Secretary of State in 1765.

Parsons entertained his guests, and they reported on her informed conversation. In 1767 the Duke became first minister, and she had the influence, if not the position, of a First Lady in her country. Richard Rigby used her influence to turn opinions against the Duke's wife. There was further gossip when the Duchess of Grafton become pregnant by her lover, the Earl of Upper Ossory. She and the Duke were divorced by Act of Parliament on the 23 March 1769. Parsons might have become the First Minister's wife had he not discovered that Parsons was having an affair with John Sackville, 3rd Duke of Dorset.

Three months later, on 24 June 1769, the Duke married Elizabeth Wrottesley (1 November 1745 – 25 May 1822), daughter of the Reverend Sir Richard Wrottesley, Dean of Worcester.

Nancy Parsons in Turkish dress – portrait of Parsons by George Willison, c. 1771

In around 1770 she was painted by Joshua Reynolds. Again in 1771 she was painted by George Willison in "Turkish Dress". That painting is now in the Yale Centre for British Art.

She and Sackville spent the next six or seven years together, until 1776, when Parsons attracted the attention of Charles Maynard, second Viscount Maynard. At this point Maynard was 23 and Parsons was maybe ten years older. The two married on 24 September 1776 in London before visiting Italy, where they had difficulty entering the Royal court because of their history.

In 1784 the two created a menage a trois with the teenage Francis Russell, 5th Duke of Bedford. This liaison was with Russell's grandmother's approval and it continued until 1787. Parsons was received by minor members of the Royal Family, and spent the remainder of her life solo in Italy and France. She died near Paris in 1814 or 1815.
