= Thomas Creevey =

English politician and writer (1768–1838)

Thomas Creevey (March 1768 – 5 February 1838) was an English politician. He is best known for his insight into social conditions as revealed by his writings, which were published in 1903.

== Life ==
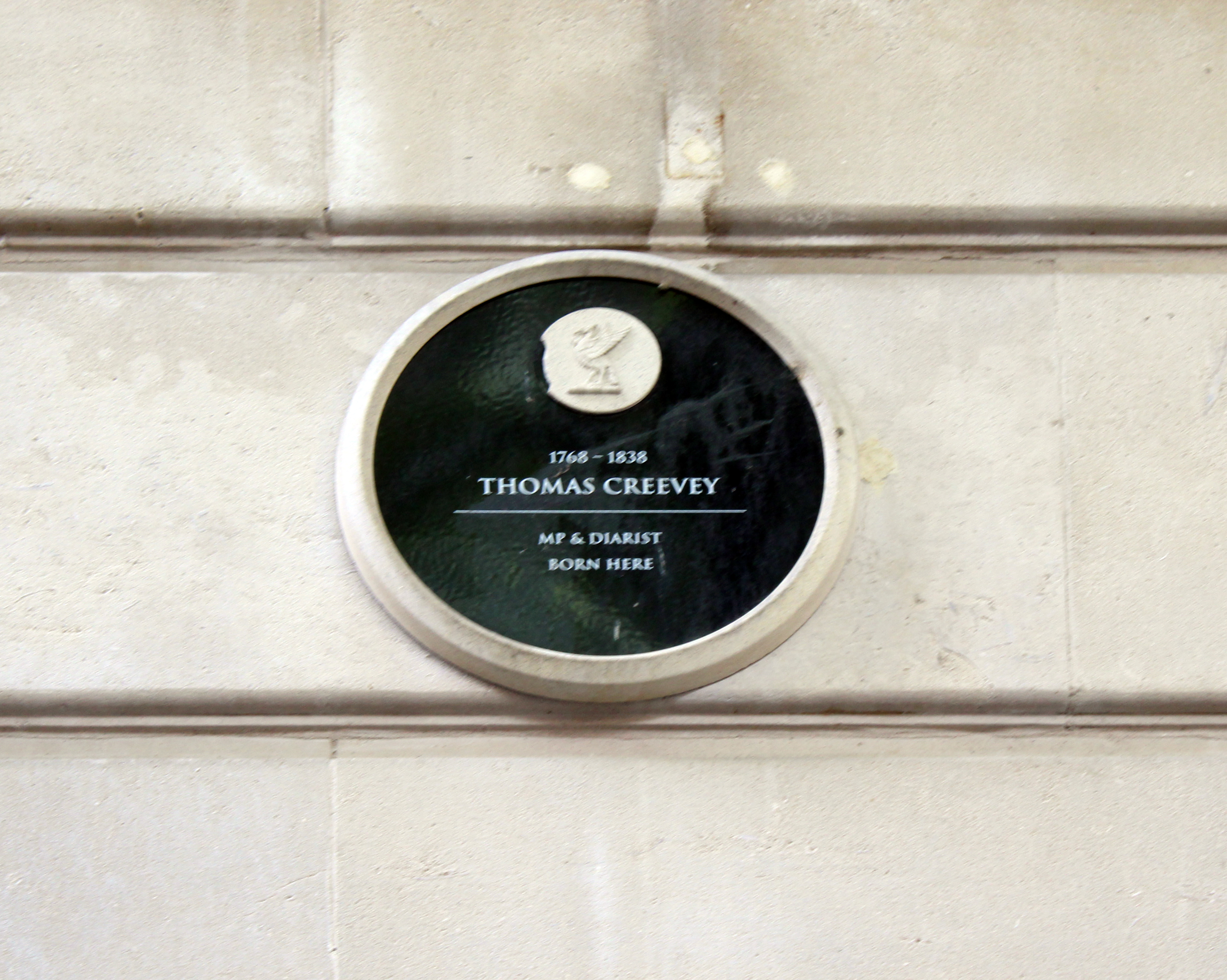
Commemorative plaque in School Lane, Liverpool

Creevey was the son of William Creevey, a Liverpool merchant, and was born in that city. He went to Queens' College, Cambridge, and graduated as seventh Wrangler in 1789. The same year he became a student at the Inner Temple, and was called to the bar in 1794. In 1802 he entered Parliament through the Duke of Norfolk's nomination as member for Thetford, and married a widow with six children, Mrs Ord, who had a life interest in a comfortable income.

Creevey was a Whig and a follower of Charles James Fox, and his active intellect and social qualities procured him a considerable intimacy with the leaders of this political circle. In 1806, when the brief "All the Talents" ministry was formed, he was given the office of secretary to the Board of Control; in 1830, when next his party came into power, Creevey, who had lost his seat in parliament, was appointed by Lord Grey Treasurer of the Ordnance; and subsequently Lord Melbourne made him treasurer of Greenwich Hospital. Creevey is also known for being the first civilian to interview the Duke of Wellington after the Battle of Waterloo in June 1815. He and his wife, who was ill at the time, were vacationing in Brussels when Napoleon was defeated by British and Prussian forces near the Belgian border. At their meeting in Wellington's headquarters, Creevey recorded the Duke's famous quote about the battle ("It was a near run thing. The nearest run thing you ever saw in your life.")

After 1818, when his wife died, he had very slender means of his own, but he was popular with his friends and was well looked after by them; his close association with Lord Sefton, led to speculation that they were biological half-brothers—a rumour which Creevey himself appeared to abet. Charles Greville, writing of him in 1829, remarks that "old Creevey is a living proof that a man may be perfectly happy and exceedingly poor. I think he is the only man I know in society who possesses nothing."

He is remembered through the Creevey Papers, published in 1903 under the editorship of Sir Herbert Maxwell, which, consisting partly of Creevey's own journals and partly of correspondence, give a lively and valuable picture of the political and social life of the late Georgian era, and are characterized by an almost Pepysian outspokenness. They are a useful addition and correction to the Croker Papers, written from a Tory point of view.

For thirty-six years Creevey had kept a "copious diary", and had preserved a vast miscellaneous correspondence with such people as Lord Brougham, and his stepdaughter, Elizabeth Ord, had assisted him, by keeping his letters to her, in compiling material avowedly for a collection of Creevey Papers in the future.

At his death it was found that he had left his mistress, with whom he had lived for four years, his sole executrix and legatee, and Greville notes in his Memoirs the anxiety of Brougham and others to get the papers into their hands and suppress them. The diary, mentioned above, did not survive, perhaps through Brougham's success, and the papers from which Sir Herbert Maxwell made his selection came into his hands from Mrs Blackett Ord, whose husband was the grandson of Creevey's eldest stepdaughter.

Parliament of the United Kingdom
| Preceded by Joseph Randyll Burch; John Harrison | Member of Parliament for Thetford; 1802–1806; With: John Harrison | Succeeded by Lord William FitzRoy; James Mingay |
| Preceded by Lord William FitzRoy; James Mingay | Member of Parliament for Thetford; 1807–1818; With: Lord William FitzRoy 1807–1812; Lord John Edward FitzRoy 1812–1818 | Succeeded by Lord Charles FitzRoy; Nicholas William Ridley-Colborne |
| Preceded by Adolphus John Dalrymple; George Tierney | Member of Parliament for Appleby; 1820–1826; With: Adolphus John Dalrymple | Succeeded by Viscount Maitland; Henry Tufton |
| Preceded by James Brougham; Charles Shaw-Lefevre | Member of Parliament for Downton; 1831–1832; With: James Brougham 1831; Philip Pleydell-Bouverie 1831–1832 | Constituency abolished |
Political offices
| Preceded by William Holmes | Treasurer of the Ordnance; 1831–1835 | Succeeded by Alexander Perceval |
