= John Henry Smyth =

Member of Parliament for Cambridge University
- In office 1812–1822 Serving with Henry Temple
- Preceded by: Vicary Gibbs; Henry Temple
- Succeeded by: Henry Temple; William John Bankes

Personal details
- Born: 20 March 1780
- Died: 20 October 1822 (aged 42) Hastings
- Party: Whig
- Spouse(s): Sarah Caroline Ibbetson (m. 1810; died 1811) Lady Elizabeth FitzRoy (after 1814)
- Relations: Anne FitzPatrick, Countess of Upper Ossory (grandmother); Augustus FitzRoy, 3rd Duke of Grafton (grandfather)
- Children: 6, including John and Henry
- Parent(s): John Smyth; Lady Georgiana FitzRoy
- Education: Eton College
- Alma mater: Trinity College, Cambridge

John Henry Smyth (20 March 1780 – 20 October 1822) was a Whig member of Parliament for Cambridge University from 9 June 1812 until his death.

== Early life ==
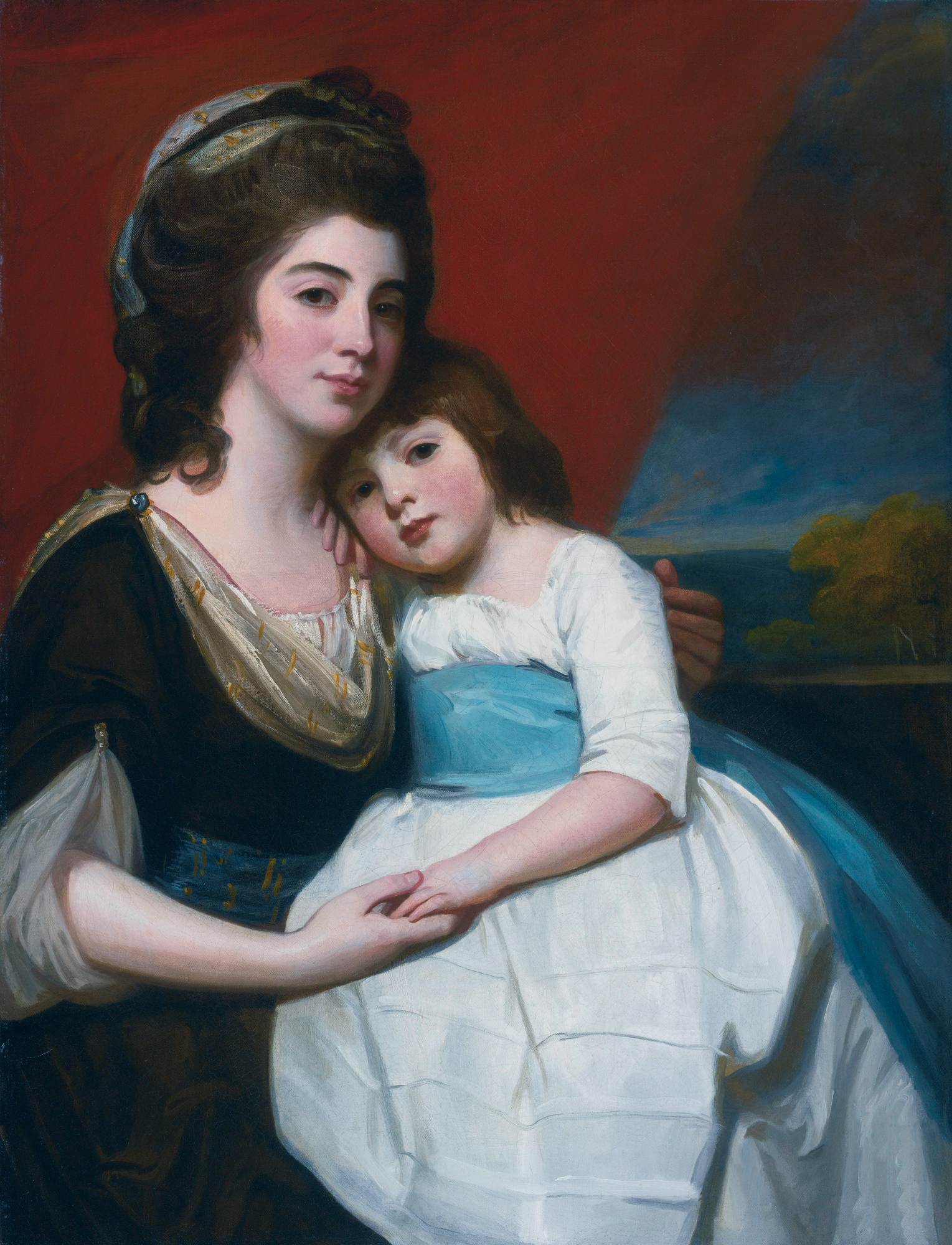
Portrait of his mother, Lady Georgiana Smyth, and John, by George Romney, 1783

Smyth was born on 20 March 1780. He was one of four sons and two daughters born to Lady Georgiana FitzRoy (1757–1799) and John Smyth (1748–1811), who served as MP of Pontefract from 1783 to 1807. He was also Lord of the Admiralty, Lord of the Treasury, Master of the Mint, and a Commissioner of the Board of Trade.

His paternal grandparents were John Smyth and the former Bridget Foxley (daughter of Benjamin Foxley of London). His maternal grandparents were Hon. Anne Liddell (daughter of Henry Liddell, 1st Baron Ravensworth) and Augustus FitzRoy, 3rd Duke of Grafton, the Prime Minister from 1768 to 1770.

Smyth was educated at Eton College and then Trinity College, Cambridge, where he studied Classics, and the Middle Temple.

== Career ==
Before he was elected to Parliament, Smyth was Under-Secretary of State for the Home Department in Pitt's government at his father's request, from July 1804 to February 1806. His father sought to have him elected to Parliament in 1802. He stood for election in the Cambridge University constituency in 1811 when his uncle vacated his seat on joining the Lords, but he lost to Henry Temple, Lord Palmerston 451–345. Although he had served Pitt and his father was a Conservative, the younger Smyth had become a Whig at university and sat for that party when finally elected unopposed the following year when the other Cambridge University seat also became vacant. As an MP from 1812, he supported reduced military spending, reduced taxation, and the end of the slave trade, and he joined the finance committee in 1819. He was unwell during his last term in office and lived in Hastings for several months in the hope of recovering his health, but he died there in October 1822.

He was a Captain of the South-West Yorkshire yeomanry, and a governor of Wakefield Grammar School from 1811.

== Personal life ==
Smyth was twice married. His first marriage was to Sarah Caroline Ibbetson, daughter of Henry Ibbetson of St. Anthony's, on 5 July 1810, but she died the following year on 29 May 1811 aged just 25. From his father, Smyth inherited Heath Hall, Wakefield, Yorkshire.

Three years later on 18 April 1814, he was remarried to his cousin Lady Elizabeth Anne FitzRoy, daughter of George FitzRoy, 4th Duke of Grafton and the former Charlotte Maria Waldegrave. They had two sons and four daughters:

- John George Smyth (1815–1869), a Conservative MP for City of York; he married Hon. Diana Bosville Macdonald, daughter of Lt.-Gen. Godfrey Macdonald, 3rd Baron Macdonald.
- Henry Smyth (1816–1891), an Army officer who married Rebecca Mary Peirce, daughter of Thomas Peirce.
- Elizabeth Sarah Smyth (1818–1860), who married Abraham Robarts. They were the paternal grandparents of Gerald Robarts.
- Louisa Georgiana Smyth (d. 1842), who married Gervase Parker Bushe.
- Maria Isabella Smyth (d. 1889), who married her cousin Robert FitzRoy, 2nd Governor of New Zealand.
- Frances Smyth (d. 1892), who married Thomas Wood, MP for Middlesex.

He was buried in the same vault as his first wife Sarah, in the church of the parish of St. Peter at Warmfield in Kirkthorp, where they were married.

=== Descendants ===
Through his son John, he was a grandfather of Diana Smyth, who married Henry Lascelles, 4th Earl of Harewood.

Through his second son Henry, he was a great-grandfather of Sir John Smyth, 1st Baronet, recipient of the Victoria Cross.

Parliament of the United Kingdom
Preceded by Vicary Gibbs; Henry Temple	Member of Parliament for Cambridge University; 1812 (by-election) – 1822; With: Henry Temple	Succeeded by Henry Temple; William John Bankes
