= Mares and Foals in a River Landscape =

Painting by George Stubbs

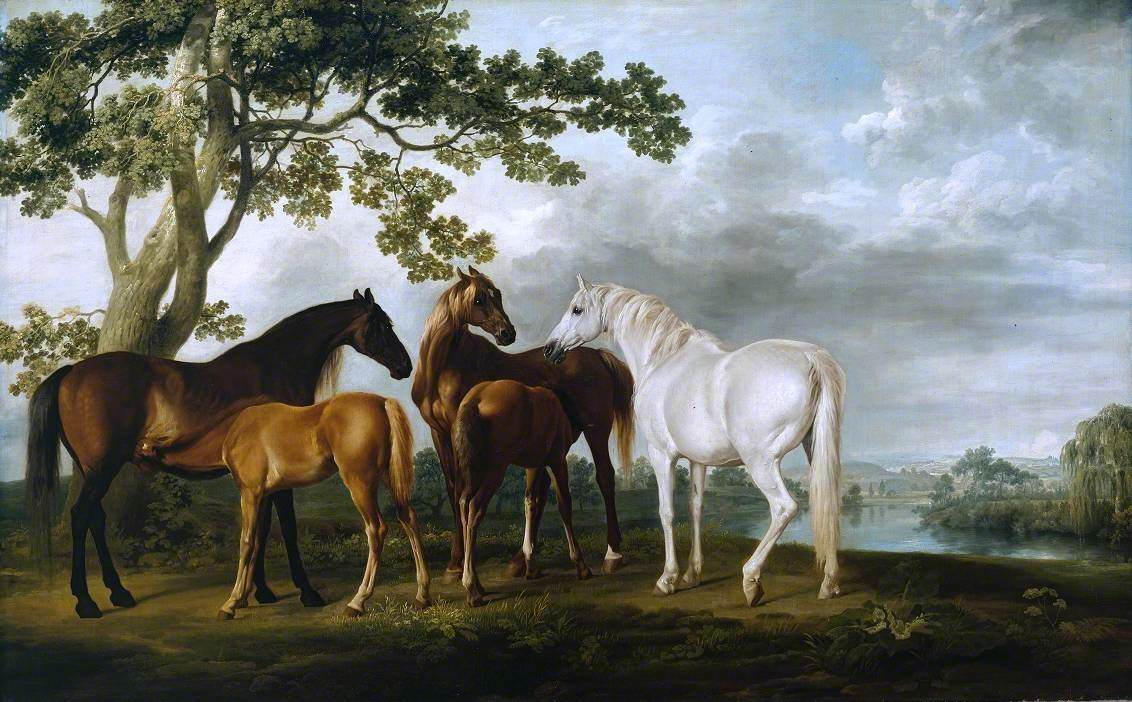
- Artist: George Stubbs
- Year: c. 1763-1768
- Type: Oil on canvas
- Dimensions: 161.9 cm × 101.6 cm (63.7 in × 40.0 in)
- Location: Tate Britain, London

Mares and Foals in a River Landscape is an oil on canvas painting by the English painter George Stubbs, created around 1763 and 1768. It is held in the Tate Modern, in London.

== History and description ==
This painting was created at a time when Stubbs, commissioned by wealthy English aristocrats, was widely involved in the portraiture of famous horses and mares. The current work, of which there are two versions, appears to have been commissioned by Augustus Fitzroy, 3rd Duke of Grafton. Stubbs depiction was based on a very similar painting, Mares and Foals without a Background, from 1762, a commission from Lord Rockingham. He depicted at the time several groups of horses in all sorts of landscapes, from mountains to rivers and woodlands.

This painting depicts five horses, three mares and two foals, under an oak tree and with a cloudy sky. They have as a background a landscape where a river is visible at the right. The five horses are all shown in profile or in a three-quarter view, and have particularly expressive body language. The painting has a "calm and lyrical" atmosphere, and does not depict humans or other animals. The gray mare on the right of the painting has often been depicted as an Arabian horse, but according to Donna Landry, it is possibly a Barb, as equestrian Arabomania often led to a tendency to see the Arabian breed where it was absent.
