= John Hanger (banker) =

British merchant and banker

- Born: c. 1656
- Died: 1733 (aged 76–77)
- Occupations: Merchant and banker
- Known for: Governor of the Bank of England
- Spouse: Mary Coles

John Hanger (c. 1656 – 1733) was a merchant of Trinity Minories who was Governor of the Bank of England from 1719 to 1721 when the Bank of England was closely involved in the financing of the South Sea Company. His family were closely associated with the hundred of Bray in Berkshire and a memorial to the family exists in St Michael's Church there.

== Early life and family ==
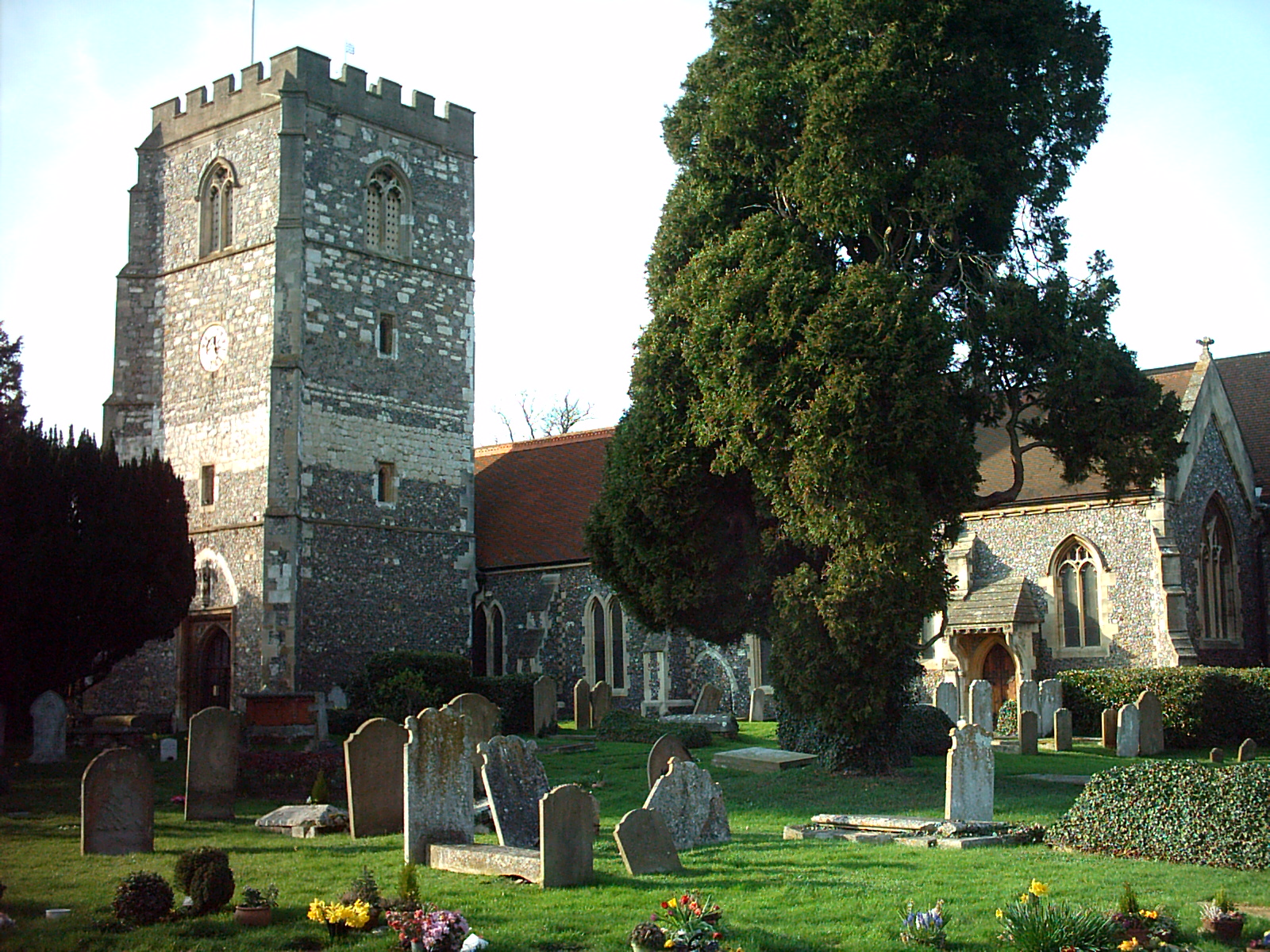
St Michael's Church, Bray, site of the monument to the Hanger family

John Hanger was born around 1656. His family were associated with the hundred of Bray.

Hanger married Mary Coles. His eldest daughter, Anne (or Ann) (died 1754, aged 53), married Henry Hare, 3rd Baron Coleraine, in 1718. She was accompanied by a dowry of nearly £100,000. The couple separated only two years later, without issue, and the barony of Coleraine became extinct upon his death in 1749. The title was revived though in 1762 for Hanger's nephew, Gabriel Hanger, who became the 1st Baron Coleraine of the second creation. John Hanger's second daughter, Mary, died in 1739 aged 35 and his youngest daughter Elizabeth in 1744–45 aged 38. The monument to Mary was sculpted by Peter Scheemakers.

== Career ==
Hanger was a merchant of Trinity Minories, just outside the boundaries of the City of London but within the liberties of the Tower of London. He was also Deputy Governor of the Bank of England from 1717 to 1719. He replaced Gerard Conyers as governor in 1719 and served as such until 1721 when he was succeeded by Thomas Scawen.

He was governor at the time when the Bank of England was intimately involved in the financing of the South Sea Company (known for the South Sea Bubble). In November 1720, he and a party of bank officials visited the company and after enquiring into the security it could give, Hanger read a letter informing them that the bank would only provide the first £400,000 of its agreed rescue subscription of £3m, the future proceeds of which had underpinned the share price. Afterwards, the company's share price collapsed to a new low, the bank's inaction causing, it was said, more families to be ruined than all the actions of the directors of the South Sea Company. In 1871, Hanger featured as a character in W. Harrison Ainsworth's novelisation of those events.

== Death and legacy ==
Hanger died in 1733 aged 77. A marble memorial to the family exists in St Michael's Church, Bray, the details of which were documented by the architectural historian Peter Spokes in the Berkshire Archaeological Journal in 1939.

Government offices
Preceded by Sir Gerard Conyers	Governor of the Bank of England; 1719 – 1721	Succeeded by Sir Thomas Scawen
