= An Account of Corsica =

Book by James Boswell

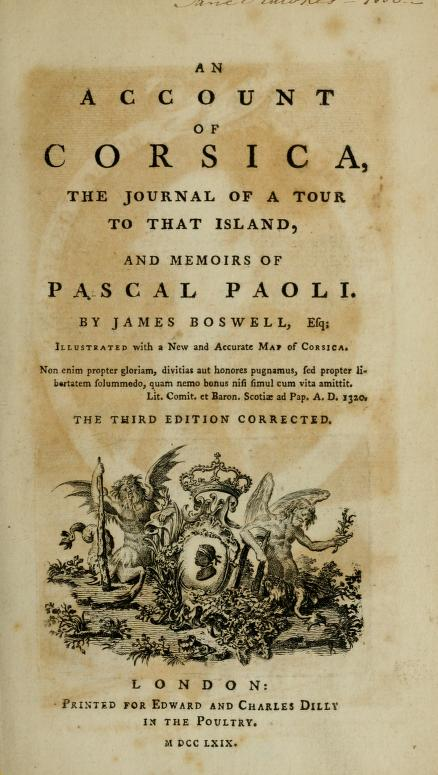
- Author: James Boswell
- Subject: Memoirs of Pasquale Paoli and travel in Corsica
- Publication date: 1768
- Publication place: Scotland

An Account of Corsica is the earliest piece of writing related to the Grand Tour literature that was written by the Scottish author James Boswell. Its first and second editions were published in 1768, with a third edition within twelve months. The full title given to the journal is An account of Corsica, the journal of a tour to that island and memoirs of Pascal Paoli.

The book is an account of Boswell's travels in Corsica during a period of military and social upheaval and his subsequent befriending of the Corsican independence movement leader, General Pasquale Paoli. The British involvement in the issues of Corsica included the Corsican Crisis, and the French involvement culminated with the French conquest of Corsica.

The Journal contains a foreword in the form of a letter from the Right Honourable George Lord Lyttelton; the "Account" section details the history, geography and topography of Corsica, while "The Journal and Memoirs" section covers Boswell's trip and Paoli's memoirs.

== Background ==
In 1765, after spending some time travelling throughout Europe on his Grand Tour, Boswell decided to go to Corsica. He had been in Italy for nine months but wanted to visit somewhere different from the destinations usually included by those undertaking a tour of Europe. Corsica appealed to him as a Scot, as he thought he would gain new experiences and learn more about a nation fighting for its liberty. He had been encouraged to visit by Rousseau. While in Corsica, Boswell stayed overnight in convents and was hospitably treated. The locals were naturally courteous but some mistook Boswell for an "English envoy". The highlight of his visit was being introduced to Pasquale Paoli.

In a letter from Marseilles in 1765, Boswell wrote upon meeting General de Paoli in Corsica:

Sir, I am upon my travels, and have lately visited Rome: I am come from seeing the ruins of one brave and free people: I now see the rise of another.

It was a dangerous time as occupational forces from France and Genoa sought to quell the rebellious Corsican independence movement which brought about the short lived Corsican Republic.

Before Boswell returned to London, he began to campaign on behalf of Corsica. Several letters were sent to the London Chronicle, some of which were only loosely based on the truth. These continued to be distributed on his return to London; he also approached the Prime Minister William Pitt about it to highlight the plight of his Corsican friends.

This campaign helped keep the plight of Corsica to the forefront of the British public; Boswell further encouraged interest in the situation in Corsica by submitting letters from imaginary people purported to be soldiers, diplomats and such like. While this stimulated support, it also garnered interest in his book.

General Paoli exiled himself in London and was to remain a lifelong friend of Boswell's.

== Content ==
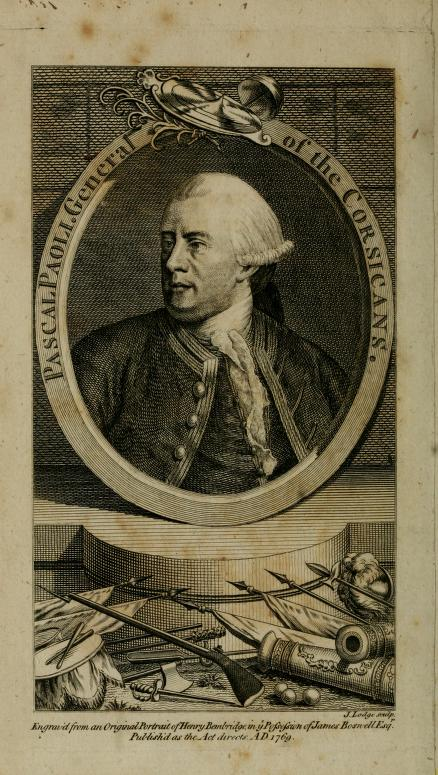
Engraved illustration on the title page

The title page includes the Latin "Non enim propter gloriam, divitias aut honores pugnamus, sed propter libertatem solummodo, quam nemo bonus nisi simul cum vita amittit, " with the source given as "Lit. Comit. et Baron. Scotiae. ad Pap. A.D. 1320 ("a Letter of the Counts and Barons of Scotland to the Pope, AD 1320"). This identifies the epigraph as from the Scottish Declaration of Arbroath; it may be translated "We do not fight for honour, riches, or glory, but solely for freedom which no true man gives up but with his life."

The foreword includes a letter from George Lord Lyttelton that thanks Boswell for the book and at the same time berates the Government of that period for its stance on Corsica. Lyttelton states the Government should have shown "more respect for Corsican liberty" and that he thought it "disgraces our nation that we do not live in good friendship with a brave people engaged in the noblest of all contests, a contest against tyranny" as he felt they had "never given us any cause for complaint."

The first section, "The Account", comprises three chapters. In the first chapter of the book, Boswell opens with the geography, topography, social customs and habits of the inhabitants or as he titles the first chapter – "Of the Situation, Extent, Air, Soil, and Productions, of Corsica". The second chapter gives "A concise View of the Revolutions which Corsica has undergone from the earliest times" and the final chapter of this section deals with "The present State of Corsica, with respect to Government, Religion, Arms, Commerce, Learning, the Genius and Character of its Inhabitants". Thereafter appears an Appendix, containing Corsican State Papers.

Completing the book is the section which most enthralled readers, "The Journal of a Tour to Corsica and Memoirs of Pascal Paoli." Boswell's experiences while travelling in Corsica are covered in the pages in these chapters given in a conversational style.

== Reception ==
Account of Corsica, 1768

First printed in February 1768, An Account of Corsica was Boswell's first published book. The printers were Edward and Charles Dilly of London who purchased the copyright to the book for one hundred guineas in August 1767. Three thousand five hundred copies were initially printed but were all sold within six weeks of publication. Two further editions were quickly reproduced, each print run again of three thousand five hundred copies. It was also being sold in German, Dutch, French and Italian translations within twelve months. Copies of the first edition were sold for six Shillings each.

The book was well received and is credited with catapulting Boswell to fame 23 years before his best known work, The Life of Samuel Johnson, was produced. While Boswell was alive, sales of An Account of Corsica were greater than any of his other publications, including The Life of Samuel Johnson book.

Such was the success of the book it is said that Boswell was referred to throughout his life thereafter as "Corsica Boswell" At the time of the publication of the third edition, in correspondence with William Temple at the beginning of May 1769, Boswell wrote: "I beseech you to write to me without delay: Dublin is Address enough for Corsican Boswell."

At the time the book was published Boswell was twenty-eight years of age and his work was widely read throughout Europe. After the publication of An Account of Corsica Anna Barbauld, a prominent literary critic and poet, wrote a poem about him, which was described by Lucas as a "heroic verse". Boswell was also praised by the marquise du Deffand in correspondence she had with Horace Walpole. The book also received praise from Napoleon Bonaparte.

The book was not well received by everyone; Boswell's father, Lord Auchinleck, referred to Paoli as "a landlouping scoundrel of a Corsican" and Samuel Johnson was belligerent with Boswell's prolonged interest in Corsica and implored him to "empty your head of Corsica, which I think has filled it rather too long". However, Johnson did find parts of the account gratifying. He felt the history part of The Account was the same as any other historical writing but thought The Journal to be "curious and delightful". Catharine Macaulay, an historian of the time, also found fault with the initial Account of Corsica and said it was not as good as The Journal. Thomas Gray was more judicious in his praise; he admired the sections about Paoli but said the correct title for other sections of the book should have been "Dialogue between a Green-goose and a Hero."

More recent analysis of Boswell's work also debates a theme of hero worship. In 2008, the literary critic William C. Dowling speculated Boswell's journals were founded on his depictions of "heroic characters". The basis for The Life of Samuel Johnson and The Journal of a Tour to the Hebrides, both written with Johnson as the hero, and An Account of Corsica portraying Paoli as a hero. Armstrong Starkey wrote in 2003 that Boswell's description of Paoli made him a figure of romance and characterised him as a sage and virtuous "ancient Roman patriot" who only had the interests of his country at heart rather than self glory.

Writing in 1995, Rogers highlights similarities between the tales found in An Account of Corsica and the Tour of the Hebrides and refers to Boswell as wanting to be a "vagabond with a cause" and describes the Corsican uprising as "a real gift to Boswell".
