= Corsican Crisis =

Event in British politics

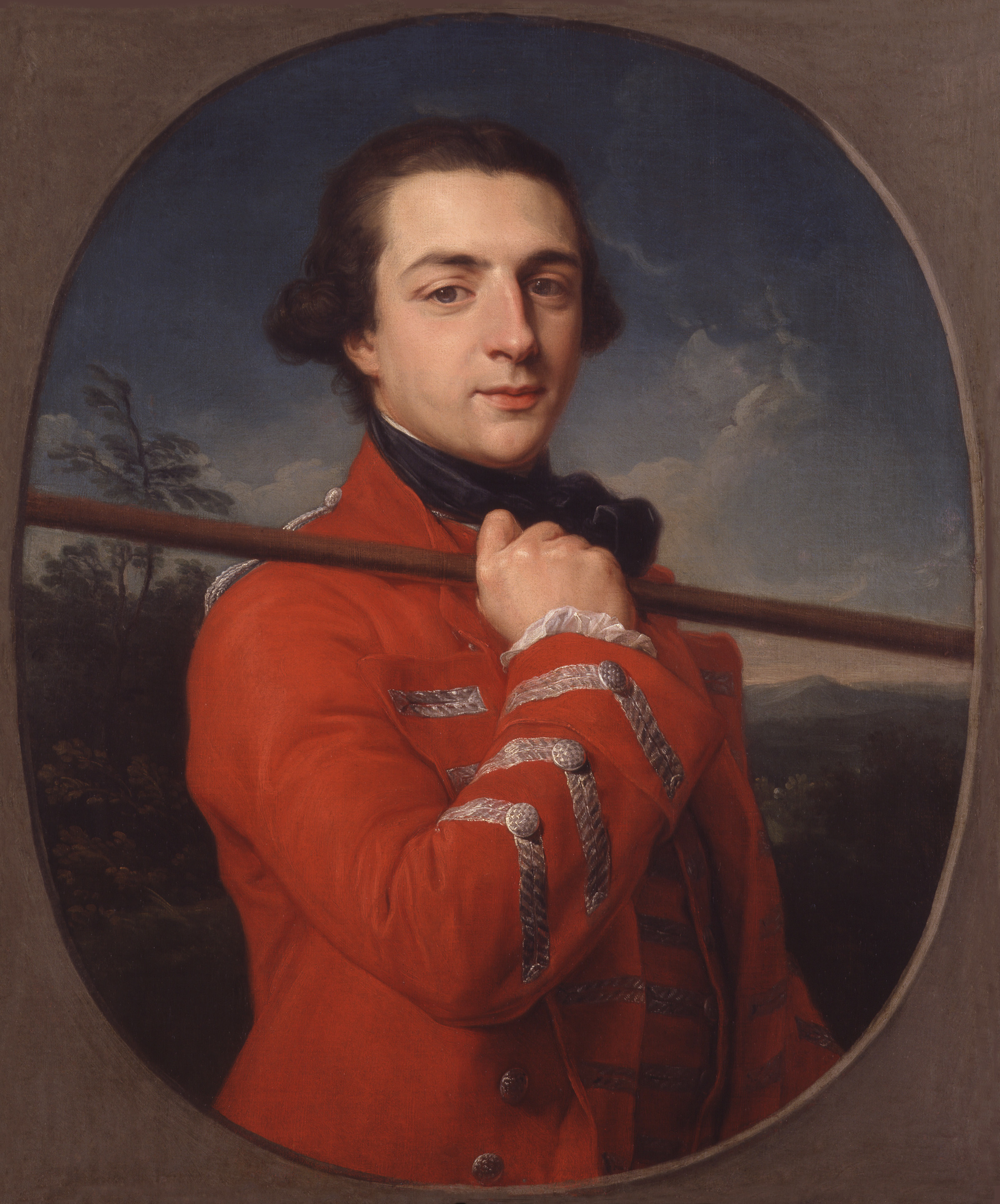
1762 portrait of the Duke of Grafton, who was Prime Minister during the Corsican Crisis

The Corsican Crisis was an event in British politics during 1768–69. It was precipitated by the invasion of the island of Corsica by France. The British government under the Duke of Grafton failed to intervene, for which it was widely criticised. The crisis was one of the many factors that contributed to its downfall in early 1770.

== Background ==
Corsica had been owned by Republic of Genoa for five centuries when a major rebellion broke out on the island in the 1750s. In 1755 their leader Pasquale Paoli had declared the Corsican Republic establishing rule over much of the island. After nine years of attempts to re-establish their rule over the island, the Genoese sold the island to the French in 1764 in a secret treaty.

Paoli had created a liberal Corsican Constitution heavily influenced by that of Britain. He created the most extensive voting franchise in the world, and attempted radical reforms in education. Because of Britain's enmity of France, and because the British had historically been supportive of Corsican exiles, Paoli sought to establish an alliance with Great Britain. Britain opened a consulate on the island, but events in Corsica did not feature prominently in Britain until 1768.

Britain's relations with France had remained strained since the Treaty of Paris had brought the Seven Years' War to an end. Since that treaty, France had expanded its territory, inheriting the Duchy of Lorraine and reasserting itself in Guiana.

== French Invasion ==
In 1768 French troops landed and attempted to establish control over the island, while the Treaty of Versailles officially acknowledged the transfer of the island from Genoa to France. The scheme had been the project of Étienne François, duc de Choiseul, who had been searching for a way for France to strike back at Britain since the end of the Seven Years' War in 1763.

The people rose in resistance led by Paoli, determined to defend their independence. Immediately there were calls for the British government to intervene on the side of the Corsicans. While Grafton and his foreign minister, Lord Shelburne, opposed the French seizing the island they saw there being little they could do to prevent it. The ministers were young and largely inexperienced in foreign affairs, and had accorded much more importance to events in Britain's Thirteen Colonies in America. Consequently, the British were inclined to appease France over the Corsican Crisis.

== British response ==
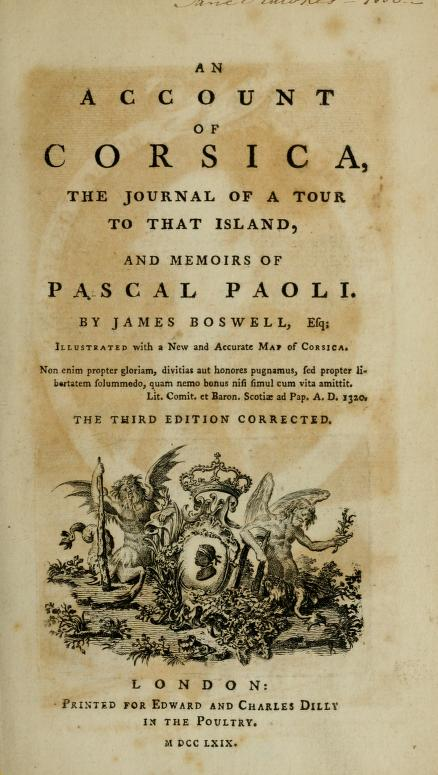
An Account of Corsica by James Boswell rallied British public opinion in favour of the Corsicans.

In contrast to the government's lack of interest, news of the invasion sparked popular support in favour of the Corsicans. James Boswell, a long-standing champion of the Corsicans, lobbied leading members of society and organised thirty cannons to be sent from the Carron Ironworks in Falkirk. Boswell's book An Account of Corsica became a best-seller and helped to fan public interest in the plight of the Corsicans.

Great Britain in the 1760s was unable to build a system of alliances with other European states as it had done in the past, a problem that became acute during the Corsican crisis and the later American War of Independence. France's invasion had been unpopular with Spain and Sardinia and, prodded into action by the public attacks on them, the British government began tentative negotiations to try to build a coalition of states that would oppose French annexation of the island. However, with a lack of will on either side, these soon collapsed. Despite calls in Parliament, Grafton refused to consider sending troops to Corsica or mobilising the Royal Navy.

== Fall of the Corsican Republic ==
On 9 May 1769 Corsican resistance was crushed at the Battle of Ponte Novu, forcing Paoli and his followers into exile. Paoli went first to Vienna, but finally took up residence in Britain, where he remained for twenty years.

The weak British response convinced Choiseul that the British were not prepared for another major war and would back down when threatened — reasoning that British naval superiority was nothing in the hands of a government that was not prepared to use it. This boosted his hopes of leading France to a crushing victory over Britain to avenge the Seven Years' War.

In 1770 Grafton resigned as first minister, and was replaced by Lord North. The same year Corsica was formally incorporated as a province of France. Despite that, it wasn’t annexed until 1789.

== Aftermath ==
The fall of Corsica was attacked in the Junius Letters which asserted that Corsica would never have been invaded had Britain showed firmness. The other major powers of Europe took note of the British failure to act, and severe damage was done to Britain's international standing. This had the knock-on effect of discouraging the Russians from concluding a treaty of alliance with Britain, leaving the British without a major ally entering into the run-up to the American Revolutionary War.

The failure of the Grafton ministry to act was compared unfavourably with the firmer action of the North ministry during the Falklands Crisis of 1770, when the Royal Navy was successfully mobilised to prevent Spain from occupying the Falklands Islands. A number of Corsican exiles served with British troops during the American War of Independence, and many made their home in Britain. British forces later tried to restore an independent Corsica in the 1790s, during the French Revolutionary Wars, in the form of an Anglo-Corsican Kingdom.

== Bibliography ==
- Rodger, N. A. M. (2006), Command of the Ocean: A Naval History of Britain, 1649–1815, Penguin Books.
- Rodger, N. A. M. (1993), The Insatiable Earl: A Life of John Montagu, Fourth Earl of Sandwich 1717–1792, Harper Collins.
- Simms, Brendan (2008), Three Victories and a Defeat: The Rise and Fall of the First British Empire, Penguin Books.
- Sisman, Alan (2006), Boswell's Presumptuous Task: Writing the Life of Dr Johnson, Harper Perennial.
- Boswell's involvement with the Crisis, IPH Lex, archived from the original on 2015-02-21. see also Account of Corsica
