= Charles Dilly =

English publisher (1739–1807)

Charles Dilly (1739–1807) was an English publisher and bookseller.

== Life ==
He was born 22 May 1739 at Southill, Bedfordshire, in a yeoman family. After making a short trip to America, he returned to London, his elder brother Edward, took him into partnership, and the business was carried on under their joint names. The brothers published James Boswell's Life of Johnson (first three editions), Tour to the Hebrides, and An Account of Corsica, Lord Chesterfield's Miscellaneous Works, and other standard books.

They were also hospitable at The Poultry, and gave dinners described in the memoirs of the period. Samuel Johnson was frequently their guest, and had his famous meeting with John Wilkes at their table, 15 May 1776; with whom he dined a second time with them, 8 May 1781. Other frequent guests were Richard Cumberland, Oliver Goldsmith, John Hoole, Vicesimus Knox, Samuel Parr, Joseph Priestley, Isaac Reed, Samuel Rogers, Sutton Sharpe and James Thomson were among the frequent dinner guests.

On the death of his brother Edward in 1779, Charles Dilly continued the business alone, and kept up the social life for which the two had been famous. He was invited to become an alderman for the ward of Cheap in 1782, but retired in favour of Boydell. A plea of nonconformity excused him from the office of sheriff of London. In 1803 he was master of the Stationers' Company.

== Last years ==
After a prosperous career of more than 40 years, Dilly retired in favour of Joseph Mawman, who had been in business in York. He continued literary dinner-parties at his new house in Brunswick Row, Queen Square, and lived there a few years before his death, which took place at Ramsgate, while on a visit to Richard Cumberland, on 4 May 1807. He was buried 12 May, in the cemetery of St. George the Martyr, Queen Square. He left a fortune of nearly £60,000.

== Politics ==
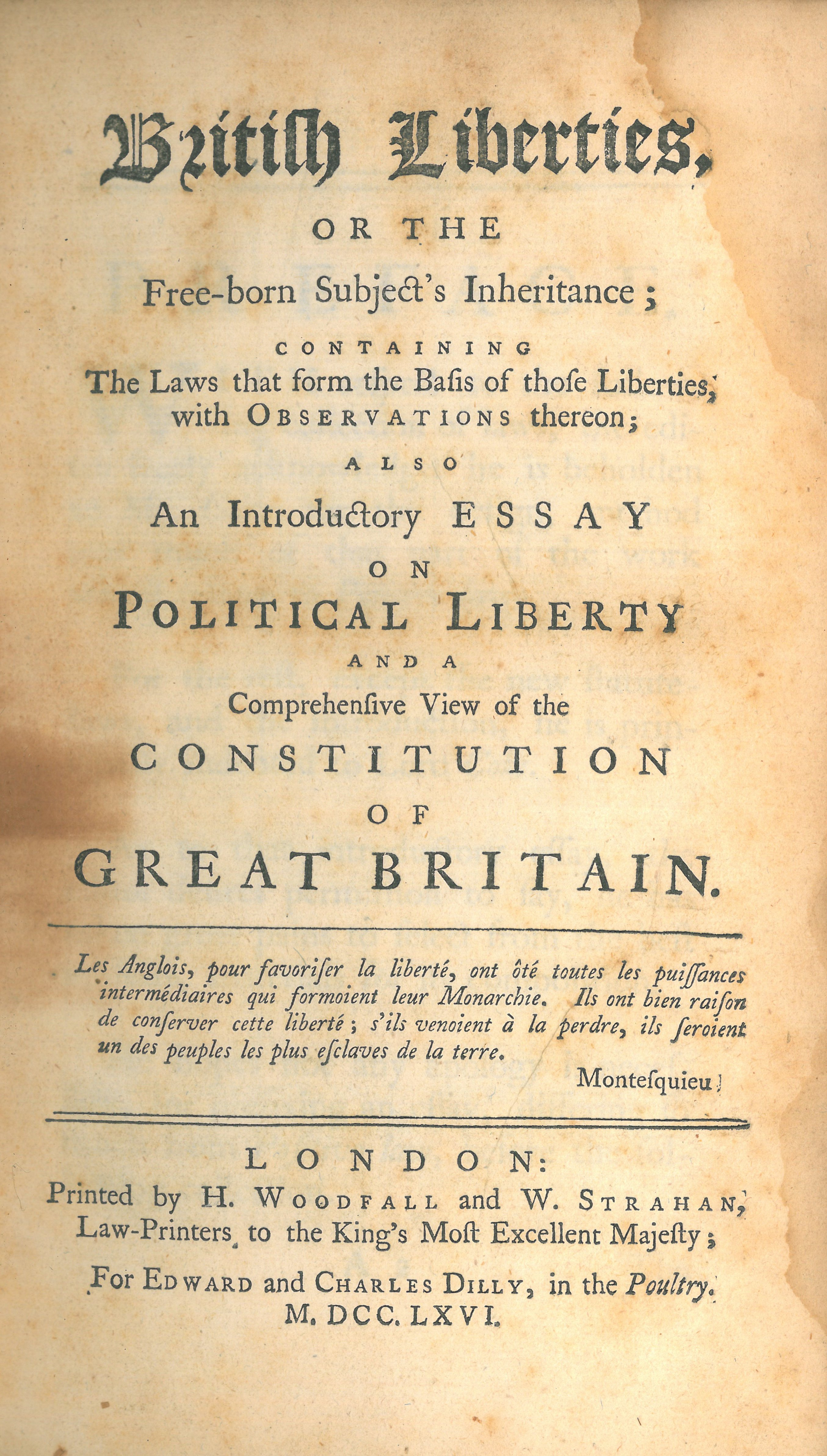
The tile-page of British Liberties, 1766

Edward and Charles Dilly were seen as radical publishers. Charles Dilly, a dissenter, belonged to the Club of Honest Whigs circle, and was a member of the Society for Constitutional Information.

== Notes ==
Attribution

This article incorporates text from a publication now in the public domain: Stephen, Leslie, ed. (1888). "Dilly, Charles". Dictionary of National Biography. Vol. 15. London: Smith, Elder & Co.
