= Gerard Conyers =

English banker and Lord Mayor of London (1649–1737)

Sir Gerard Conyers
- Born: 1649
- Died: 20 July 1737 (aged 87–88)
- Occupation: Banker

Sir Gerard Conyers (1649 – 20 July 1737) was an English banker and Lord Mayor of London.

He was Deputy Governor of the Bank of England from 1715 to 1717 and Governor from 1717 to 1719, replacing Sir Peter Delmé and being succeeded in turn by John Hanger.

He was elected alderman for Broad St ward in the City of London, appointed joint Sheriff of the City of London in 1716 and chosen Lord Mayor in 1722. As Lord Mayor he decreed that “all carts, coaches and other carriages coming out of Southwark into this City do keep all along the west side of the said bridge: and all carts and coaches going out of the City do keep along the east side of the said bridge”, thus helping to establish the British custom of driving on the left.

He was President of St. Thomas's Hospital from 1733 to 1737.

He lived at Sheen House, East Sheen from 1707 to his death.

== See also ==
- Chief Cashier of the Bank of England

Government offices
| Preceded by Sir Peter Delmé | Governor of the Bank of England; 1717 - 1719 | Succeeded by John Hanger |
Civic offices
| Preceded by Sir William Stewart | Lord Mayor of London; 1722–1723 | Succeeded by Sir Peter Delmé |
