= Lord William FitzRoy =

Royal Navy Admiral and member of Parliament (1782–1857)

Admiral Lord William FitzRoy KCB
- Born: 1 June 1782; London, England
- Died: 13 May 1857 (aged 74); East Sheen, London
- Burial place: Old Mortlake Burial Ground, Mortlake, London; 51°28′01.3″N 0°15′29.7″W
- Relatives: Augustus FitzRoy, 3rd Duke of Grafton (father); Elizabeth Wrottesley (mother); George FitzRoy, 4th Duke of Grafton (half-brother); Lord Charles FitzRoy (half-brother); Lord John FitzRoy (brother); Sir Almeric FitzRoy (grandson); Robert FitzRoy (nephew); Charles Augustus FitzRoy (nephew)
- Military career
- Allegiance: Great Britain; United Kingdom
- Branch: Royal Navy
- Service years: 1794–1811
- Rank: Admiral
- Commands: HMS Salamine; HMS Mutine; HMS Fairy; HMS Aeolus; HMS Macedonian
- Conflicts: French Revolutionary Wars; Glorious First of June; Battle of Groix; Action of 27 June 1798; Egyptian Campaign; Napoleonic Wars; Battle of Cape Ortegal; Invasion of Martinique
- Awards: Companion of the Order of the Bath (1815); Knight Commander of the Order of the Bath (1840)

Admiral Lord William FitzRoy KCB (1 June 1782 – 13 May 1857), was an officer of the British Royal Navy who served during the French Revolutionary and Napoleonic Wars, and also as a Member of Parliament.

== Biography ==
=== Family background ===
FitzRoy was the third son of Augustus FitzRoy, 3rd Duke of Grafton, by his second wife, Elizabeth Wrottesley, the daughter of the Reverend Sir Richard Wrottesley, Bt.; he was also an uncle of Vice-Admiral Robert FitzRoy.

=== Naval career ===
FitzRoy entered the Navy on 21 April 1794, on board the frigate Phaeton, firstly serving under Captain William Bentinck, and following the battle of the Glorious First of June, under Captain Robert Stopford. He then served abroad the 74-gun Leviathan, under Lord Hugh Seymour, following him into the 80-gun Sans Pareil, and seeing action at the Battle of Groix on 23 June 1795.

After serving in the frigates Niger, Captain Edward Foote; Phoenix, Captain Lawrence Halsted; and Cambrian, Captain the Hon. Arthur Kaye Legge, in February 1798 he rejoined Captain Foote on board Seahorse, and was present at the action of 27 June 1798 when Seahorse captured the Sensible in the Strait of Sicily.

FitzRoy was promoted to lieutenant on 13 May 1800 into the frigate Penelope, Captain the Honourable Henry Blackwood, in which he witnessed the surrender of Malta in September, and took part in the Egyptian Campaign in mid-1801. On 31 October 1801, he was appointed acting-commander and captain of the sloop HMS Salamine, and after confirmation on 7 January 1802 of his promotion, commanded Mutine. He returned to England, and from 26 January 1803 commanded Fairy. FitzRoy was promoted to post-captain on 3 March 1804, taking command of the frigate Aeolus, and was present at the battle of Cape Ortegal on 4 November 1805, and at the invasion of Martinique in February 1809.

In June 1810 he commissioned the frigate Macedonian to serve on the Lisbon station. On 7 April 1811 FitzRoy was dismissed from the Navy after a court-martial found him guilty of "False Expense of Stores" and "Tyranny & Oppression". FitzRoy was charged with falsifying the reports of the ships stores and selling the surplus for his own profit. He also sentenced a seaman to 48 lashes for drunkenness, four times the legal maximum. Furthermore, when challenged, FitzRoy accused the master of "contempt" and had him clapped in irons, also in breach of naval law.

Despite being declared incapable of ever serving again as an officer, FitzRoy was restored to his former rank and seniority by the Prince Regent the following August, though he received no further employment in the Navy. Nevertheless, he was made a Companion of the Order of the Bath on 4 June 1815, promoted to rear admiral on 10 January 1837, and made a Knight Commander of the Order of the Bath on 4 July 1840.

=== Political career ===
Fitzroy was still on active service in Aeolus when he was elected as Member of Parliament for the family seat of Thetford in the 1806 election, and so did not make first appearance in the house until 1810, as a supporter of the Whigs. He was replaced as MP by his brother Lord John FitzRoy at the 1812 election.

=== Personal life ===
On 9 August 1816 he married Georgiana Raikes, the second daughter of Thomas Raikes and Charlotte, granddaughter of 2nd Earl of Nottingham. They had a son and three daughters, including:

- Francis Horatio FitzRoy (6 June 1823 – 20 March 1900), who married in 1849 Honourable Gertrude Duncombe (1827–1916), daughter of William Duncombe, 2nd Baron Feversham, and left three daughters and two sons. Sir Almeric William FitzRoy (1851–1935) was their son.
- Harriet Elizabeth FitzRoy (d.14 July 1875), who married in 1862 Colonel Michael Dawes
- Elizabeth Georgiana FitzRoy (d. 5 February 1868)

Admiral FitzRoy died at East Sheen, London, on 13 May 1857, and is buried in Old Mortlake Burial Ground, Mortlake, London.

== See also ==
- O'Byrne, William Richard (1849). "Fitz-Roy, William" . A Naval Biographical Dictionary . John Murray – via Wikisource.
