= Peter Delmé (banker) =

British figure in commerce and banking

Sir Peter Delmé
- Born: 1667
- Died: 1728 (aged 60–61)
- Spouse: Anne Machan (m. 1709)
- Children: 4, including Peter

Sir Peter Delmé (1667–1728) was a notable English figure in commerce and banking in the early 18th century. He is an ancestor of the Dukes of Grafton since 1811 through his granddaughter Anne, who was married to Prime Minister Augustus FitzRoy, 3rd Duke of Grafton.

== Early life and career ==
Delmé was born in London, the third son of Huguenot exile Pierre Delmé and his wife, Sibella Nightingale.

He became a London merchant with trade to Turkey and Portugal, and at the time of his death was reputedly the "greatest exporter of woollen goods of any one person in England." He served as an Alderman of Langbourn Ward and was knighted in 1714. He was made Sheriff of London for 1717–18 and elected Lord Mayor of London for 1723–24.

He became a Director of the Bank of England in 1698 and served as Deputy Governor from 1713 to 1715 and as Governor from 1715 to 1717, after which he resumed his seat in the Court of Directors until his death in 1728.

== Family ==
He married Anne Machan, daughter of Cornelius Macham, and Elizabeth Penton, on 26 January 1709. They had four children:

- Anne Delmé (died June 1794), who married Henry Liddell, 1st Baron Ravensworth and was the mother of Anne FitzPatrick, who was divorced from the Duke of Grafton while he was Prime Minister
- Peter Delmé (28 February 1710 – 10 April 1770), who became a politician and whose son, also called Peter Delmé, also became a politician.

He died 4 September 1728 at his home in Fenchurch Street, London, England. In his will, he left a substantial estate to his children and a bequest to Morden College. An ornate memorial in his honour is in the Guild Church of St Margaret Pattens.

Government offices
Preceded by John Rudge	Governor of the Bank of England; 1715–1717	Succeeded by Sir Gerard Conyers
Civic offices
Preceded by Sir Gerard Conyers	Lord Mayor of London; 1723–1724	Succeeded by Sir George Merttins
