= Ann Liddell =

- Born: c. 1686; County Durham
- Died: 1735 or later

Ann Liddell or Ann Clavering (c. 1686 – 1735 or later) was a British political commentator.

== Life ==
Liddell was probably born in County Durham as she was baptised at Chopwell on 21 April 1686. She was the middle child of three born to Ann and John Clavering. Her maternal grandfather was Sir Henry Thompson who was an MP. Her father owned coalfields and they enjoyed a comfortable living. He married again after her mother's death and in time she had eight half brothers and sisters. Her elder sister Mary Clavering was a Lady of the Bedchamber for Caroline, Princess of Wales. In September 1706 her sister married William, Lord Cowper. This was a marriage based on her sister's beauty before she married Lord Cowper.

Disaster came when her father suddenly died as his will left his estate to his son and Ann's half brother John Clavering. John however was a child and the estate therefore was held by the Court of Chancery until her half brother reached his majority. With her elder sister married it was Ann, and nominally their cousin James Clavering, who had to find the funds to maintain the family and her sibling's education. Ann had of necessity to understand the coal business. She found that the ambiguous position of the Clavering-Stella colliery's ownership was proving a temptation to others to redirect its profits in their direction. She wrote warning letters to her cousin and fellow trustee to increase his efforts in protecting their inheritance.

Ann was living in London and she was a strong supporter of the liberals and a strong critic of the Whig's. She would write regularly to her cousin and she would describe the machinations of political trials and debates. In return she asked for news from Durham about court trials and the coal trade which determined her income. Three years of her letters were preserved by her cousin. She continued to write until she married in 1711 She passed judgement of on the Liberal (Whigs) battles with so-called churchmen including Nathaniel, Lord Crewe, bishop of Durham the Tory administration in Newcastle. Her independent view of the trial of the allegedly seditious cleric Henry Sacheverell is considered historically valuable. The preservation of the letters is thought to be due to Liddell's warnings of legal proceedings which caused her cousin to keep them safe.

She married Henry Liddell on 14 July 1711. He was the son of Sir Henry Liddell (c.1644–1723) whose seat was Ravenscroft Castle in Country Durham. Other letters survive and from these it is possible to determine Liddell's bitterness towards her sister Mary and her successful marriage to Lord Cowper. She is bitter that her family are not returning the devotion she has shown them. She expected that the Cowper's would have furthered her husband's cause with an impressive position. The Cowper's alternatively believe that they have preferred her husband and they believe that Liddell is not just bitter but ungrateful.

Her husband dies in 1717 and she finds that he stands accused of mismanaging his affairs and Liddell takes on the role of his reputation's defender. She refers to Sir James Clavering as "her son" in reference to her history of guarding his inheritance. She was to remain on good terms with him throughout her life although she thought him ungrateful. She is last mentioned in 1735. Liddell's letters are in the UK National Archives.
