= Peter Delmé (MP for Southampton) =

English merchant and landowner

Peter Delmé (28 February 1710 – 10 April 1770) was a wealthy English merchant and landowner of the mid 18th century. He served as MP for Ludgershall from 1734 to 1741 and Southampton from 1741 to 1754.

The son of a wealthy London banking figure, Sir Peter Delmé, he inherited his father's affairs at the age of 18. Through two marriages he accumulated estates at Eltham in Kent and Erlestoke in Wiltshire.

In 1741 he was elected Member of Parliament for Southampton and became a freeman of the town. In London, he was known as a patron of the arts, and influential in the Academy of Sciences and the Royal Society of London. Sometimes called 'Peter the Czar' (a reference to his considerable wealth), he managed to fritter away much of his fortune and ended his life by shooting himself in London's Grosvenor Square.

== Family ==
Peter Delmé married twice: first Anna Maria Shaw, daughter of Sir John Shaw; then Anna Maria Barnardiston in 1737. With the latter, he had two children: Anne (who married Lord Robert Seymour in June 1773) and Peter, who served as MP for Morpeth.
