= Anne FitzPatrick, Countess of Upper Ossory =

English noblewoman (1736–1804)

The Right Honourable The Countess of Upper Ossory
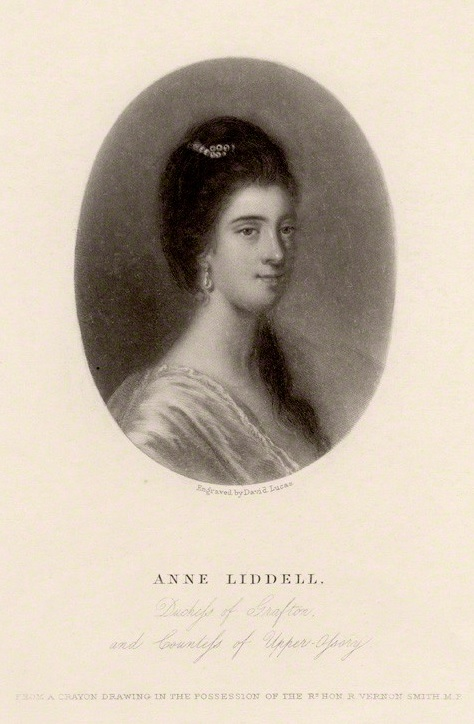
- Engraving by David Lucas
- Full name: Anne FitzPatrick
- Born: Anne Liddell; 11 August 1736
- Baptised: 6 September 1736; St George's, Hanover Square, London
- Died: 23 February 1804 (aged 67); Mayfair, London, England
- Spouses: Augustus FitzRoy, 3rd Duke of Grafton (m. 1756; div. 1769) John FitzPatrick, 2nd Earl of Upper Ossory (m. 1769)
- Issue: Lady Georgiana Smyth; George FitzRoy, 4th Duke of Grafton; Lord Charles FitzRoy; Lady Anne FitzPatrick; Lady Mary FitzPatrick; Lady Gertrude FitzPatrick
- Parents: Henry Liddell, 1st Baron Ravensworth; Anne Delmé

Anne FitzPatrick, Countess of Upper Ossory (née Liddell; 11 August [O.S. 31 July] 1736 – 23 February 1804), formerly Anne FitzRoy, Duchess of Grafton, was an English noblewoman and the first wife of Augustus Henry FitzRoy, 3rd Duke of Grafton. Grafton divorced her while serving as prime minister and while he was publicly engaging in an affair with Anne Parsons.

She was a noted correspondent of Horace Walpole. In 1761, FitzPatrick sent a silhouette that Jean Huber had created of her and her daughter to Walpole. This letter was to be the start of a correspondence of 455 letters between herself and Walpole. In a letter to Horace Mann, Walpole wrote that Anne was "not a regular beauty, but one of the finest women you ever saw, and with more dignity and address. She is one of our first great ladies."

== Early life ==
Anne Liddell was born in 1736 in Derby, the only child of Sir Henry Liddell, a coal magnate, and his wife, Anne (née Delmé). Her grandfather Sir Peter Delmé, Lord Mayor of London, was the son of French Huguenot exiles.

Her father was created Baron Ravensworth in 1747.

== Marriage to the Duke of Grafton ==
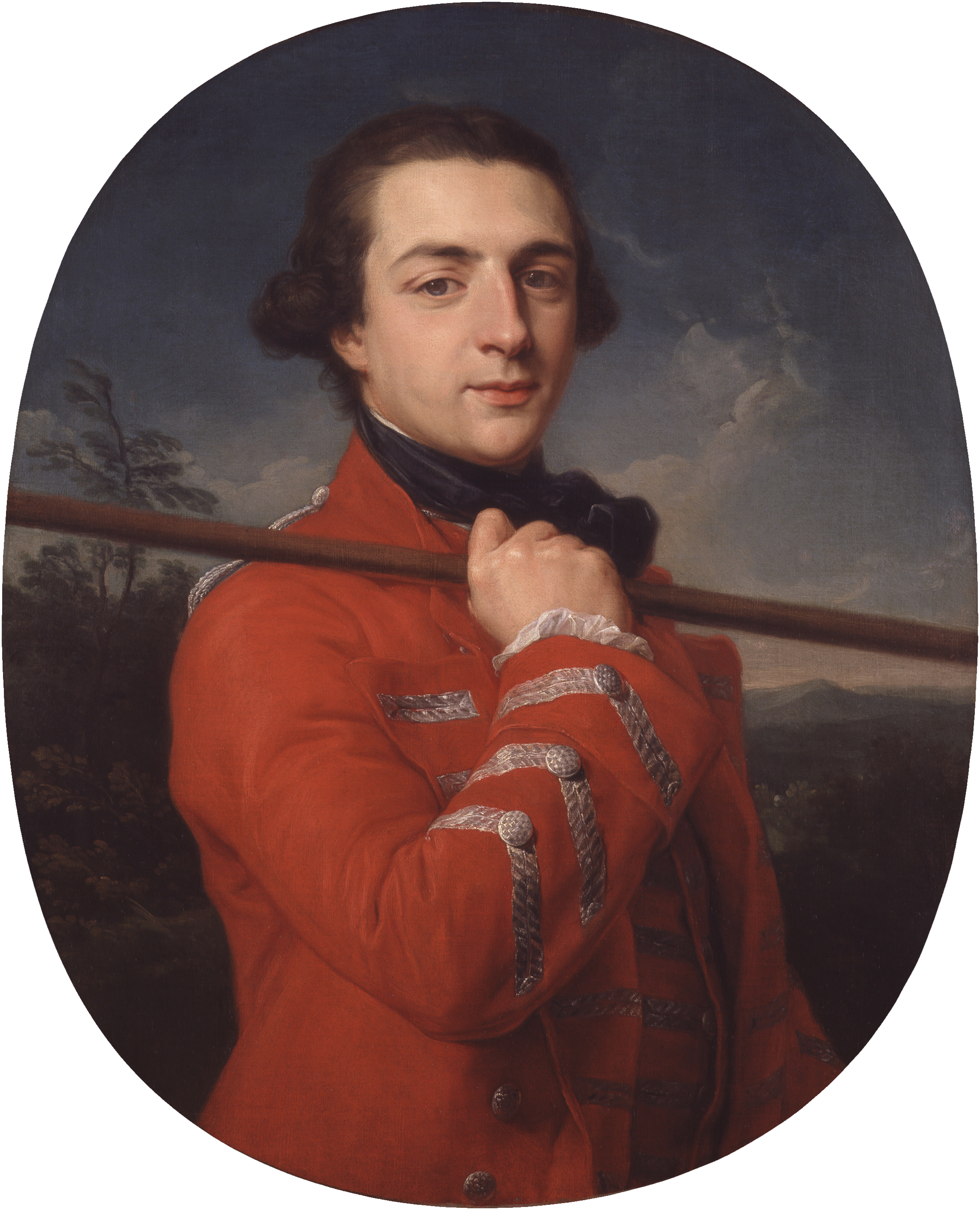
Portrait of the Duke of Grafton by Pompeo Batoni, 1762

On 29 January 1756, Anne married Augustus Henry FitzRoy, Earl of Euston, at her father's house in St James's Square, by special licence of the Archbishop of Canterbury, as she was 18 and considered a minor. The marriage was witnessed by Lord Ravensworth and Francis Seymour-Conway, 1st Earl of Hertford.

The following year he succeeded as the 3rd Duke of Grafton. Together they had three children:

- Lady Georgiana FitzRoy (8 May 1757 – 18 January 1799), who married John Smyth on 4 June 1778, and had issue
- George Henry FitzRoy, 4th Duke of Grafton (14 January 1760 – 28 September 1844), who married Lady Charlotte Maria Waldegrave, on 16 November 1784, and had issue
- General Lord Charles FitzRoy (14 July 1764 – 20 December 1829), who married, firstly, Frances Mundy on 20 June 1795, and had one son; he married, secondly, Lady Frances Stewart on 10 March 1799 and had three children. His sons Sir Charles FitzRoy (1796–1858), Governor of New South Wales, and Vice-Admiral Robert FitzRoy, a hydrographer, were notable for their achievements.

It was not a very amicable marriage. Grafton fathered 16 illegitimate children in his lifetime, and Anne supposedly had a "violent itch for play." They had attempted to renew their relationship with a trip to Florence but it was unsuccessful. In 1764, while the Duchess was pregnant with their second son, Grafton began a public affair with former prostitute Anne Parsons, whom he brought without shame to the Royal Opera. They separated the following year.

In 1766, Walpole introduced her to an Anglo-Irish peer he had met in Paris, John FitzPatrick, 2nd Earl of Upper Ossory, whom he called "one of the prosperest and most amiable young men I ever knew". The Duchess gave birth to a daughter by Ossory in August 1768.

Meanwhile, the Duke was gradually assuming control of the government during Earl of Chatham's illness and death, and in October 1768 he effectively became the first Prime Minister, as Head of Ministry. He sued her for adultery and their marriage was dissolved by Act of Parliament, passed 23 March 1769.

On 24 June 1769, Grafton married Elizabeth Wrottesley (1 November 1745 – 25 May 1822). Elizabeth was ironically Ossory's cousin, the daughter of his aunt Lady Mary Leveson-Gower and Sir Richard Wrottesley, 7th Baronet, the Dean of Worcester.

== Later life ==
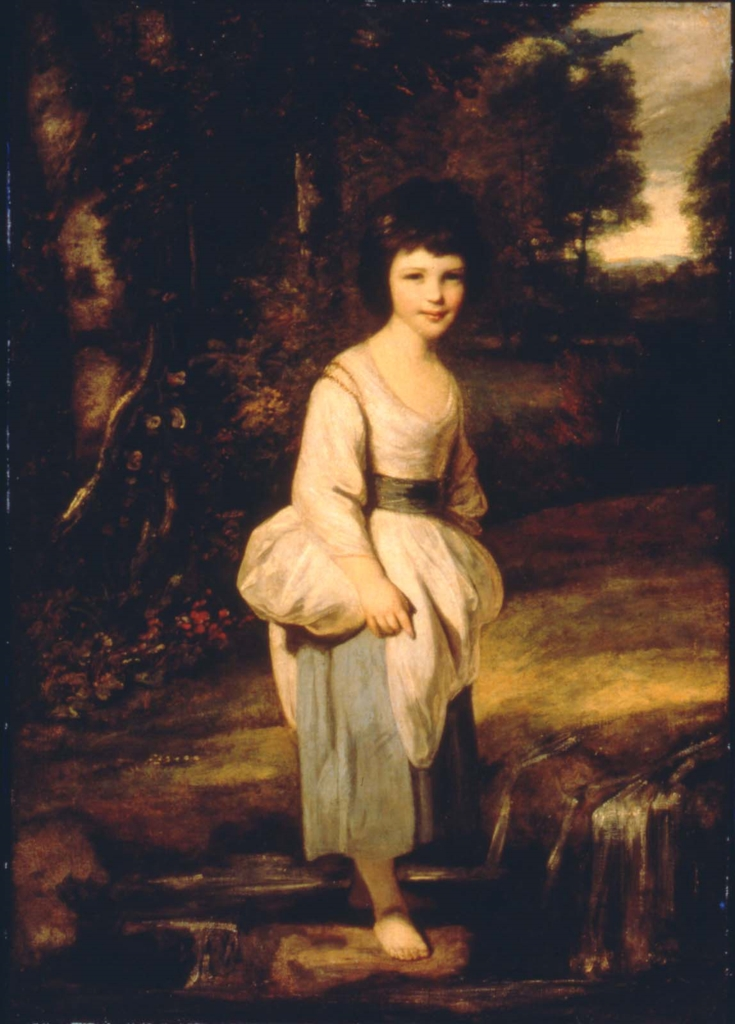
Lady Anne FitzPatrick by Sir Joshua Reynolds, c. 1775

Within days of her marriage to Grafton being dissolved, Anne married Ossory at a Kingston church in Surrey. Though the marriage legitimised their daughter, the Ossorys still found themselves exiled from much of London's social scene, as divorced women were not allowed at the Royal Court of George III. Additionally, Grafton was now the most powerful man in Westminster, even flaunting his mistress in public before Charlotte of Mecklenburg-Strelitz at the Royal Opera House.

She withdrew to the Fitzpatrick estate at Ampthill Park in Bedfordshire, where she busied herself raising her daughter and writing letters. In the first year of their marriage, Charles Douglas, 3rd Duke of Queensberry visited Ampthill wrote George Selwyn that the Ossorys "live but a dull life, and there must be a great deal of love on both sides not to tire".

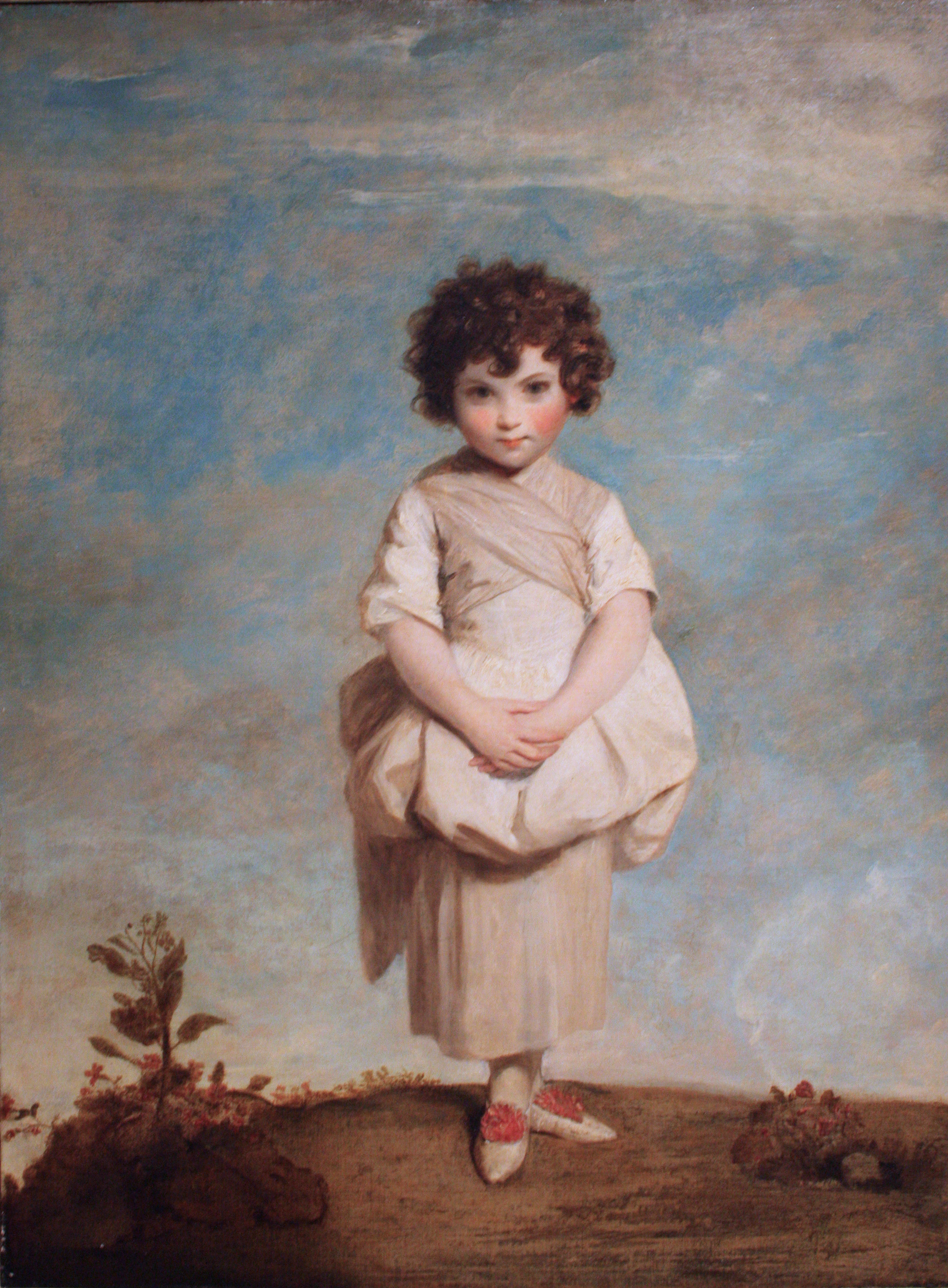
Collina, a portrait of Lady Gertrude Fitzpatrick, by Reynolds, 1779

At her encouragement, Ossory withdrew from politics and his regiment. She busied herself with her children and writing letters, corresponding mainly with Walpole, Selwyn, and her sister-in-law Mary Fox, Baroness Holland. "I can write to you about nothing but the first notes of the blackbirds, and the first opening of the buds, which are very interesting to me, but not very amusing at second hand" she wrote Walpole.

When Lady Holland (1747–1778) died four years after her husband, Stephen Fox, 2nd Baron Holland (1745–1774), their two young children, Hon. Caroline Fox (1767–1845) and Henry Vassall-Fox, 3rd Baron Holland (1773–1840) were raised at Ampthill with the Fitzpatrick children under the guardianship of the Ossorys.

The Ossorys had three daughters, two surviving:

- Lady Anne Fitzpatrick (23 August 1768 – 14 December 1841), died unmarried
- Lady Mary Fitzpatrick (24 February 1770 – March 1771), died in infancy
- Lady Gertrude Fitzpatrick (7 August 1774 – 30 September 1841), died unmarried

The countess died at their house in Grosvenor Square in 1804.

After her death, Ossory had three more children with a mistress named Elizabeth Wilson. He died in 1818.

== Sources ==
- One or more of the preceding sentences incorporates text from a publication now in the public domain: Chisholm, Hugh, ed. (1911). "Grafton, Dukes of s.v. Augustus Henry Fitzroy". Encyclopædia Britannica. Vol. 12 (11th ed.). Cambridge University Press. p. 317.
- Hellicar, Eileen (1978), Prime Ministers of Britain, David & Charles, ISBN 0-7153-7486-9
- Lewis, Wilmarth Sheldon (1978). Rescuing Horace Walpole (PDF). New Haven: Yale University Press. pp. 162–165. ISBN 978-0-300-02278-0.
