= Portrait of the Duke of Grafton =

Painting by Pompeo Batoni

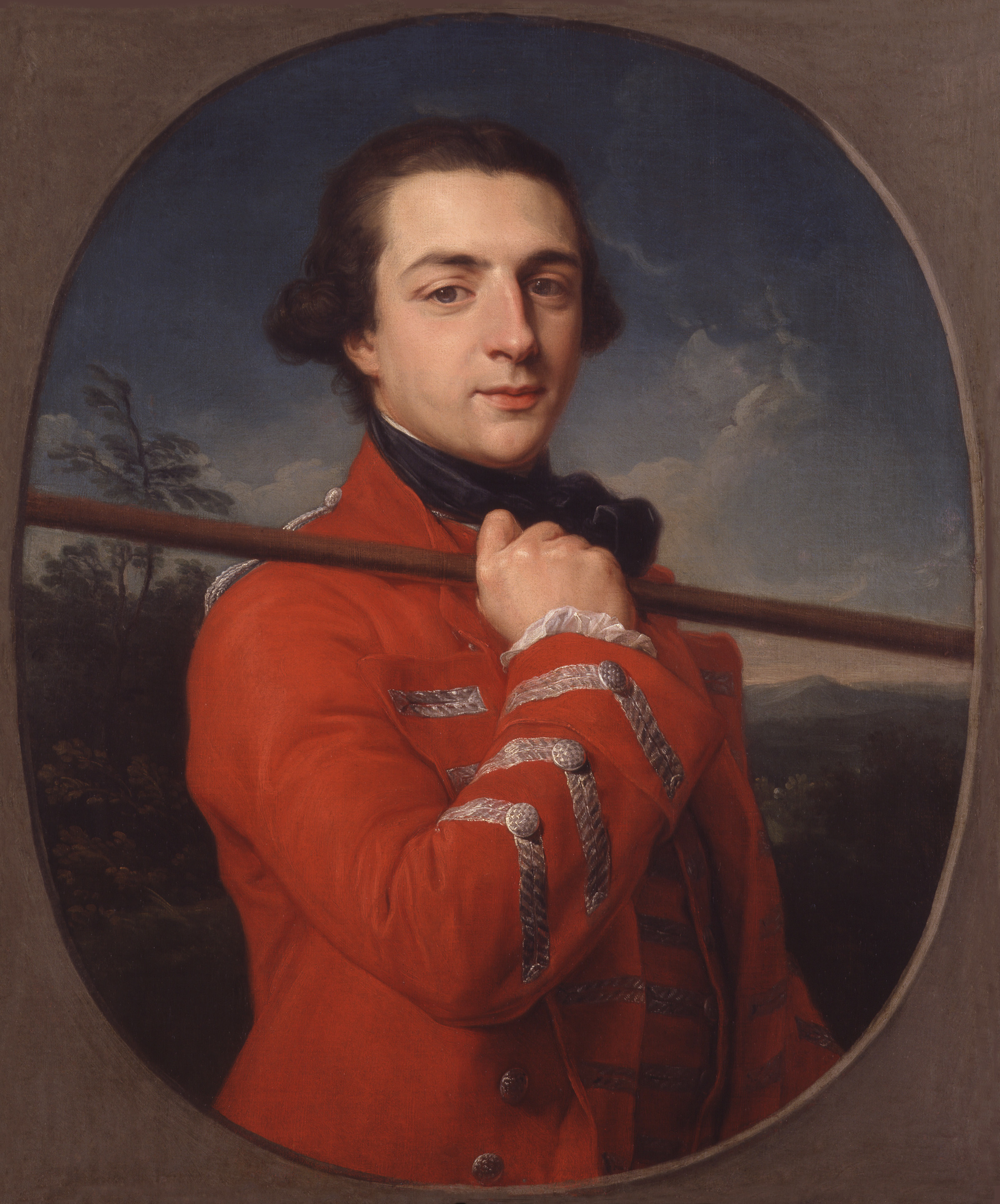
- Artist: Pompeo Batoni
- Year: 1762
- Medium: Oil on canvas
- Subject: Duke of Grafton
- Dimensions: 76.2 cm (30.0 in) × 61 cm (24 in)
- Location: Beningbrough Hall, Yorkshire
- Collection: National Portrait Gallery
- Accession no.: NPG 4899
- Identifiers: Art UK artwork ID: augustus-henry-fitzroy-3rd-duke-of-grafton-155166

Portrait of the Duke of Grafton is a 1762 portrait painting by the Italian artist Pompeo Batoni of the English aristocrat Augustus FitzRoy, 3rd Duke of Grafton, a future prime minister of Great Britain.

Like many wealthy young Britons of the era Grafton went on a Grand Tour across continental Europe, focused particularly on Italy due to its ancient history. Grafton returned for a second trip after his marriage, accompanied by his wife Anne. The marriage was already under strain and in 1769 the couple would divorce.

Grafton was painted in Rome in the uniform of the Suffolk Militia and carrying a spontoon over his shoulder. He was at the time Lord Lieutenant of Suffolk where the family estate of Euston Hall is located. In 1766 he joined the Chatham ministry. Due to the continued illness of its leader William Pitt, 1st Earl of Chatham, he effectively served as its head for much of the time. In 1768 Chatham resigned and Grafton formally took on the role of prime minister, serving until 1770. A major issue during his time in office was the Corsican Crisis triggered by the French invasion of the island.

Batoni was a leading Italian portraitist who specialised in painting grand tourists, particularly British visitors. It is now in the collection of the National Portrait Gallery, London, having been acquired in 1972.
