= Augustus FitzRoy, 3rd Duke of Grafton =

Prime Minister of Great Britain from 1768 to 1770

His Grace The Duke of Grafton KG PC
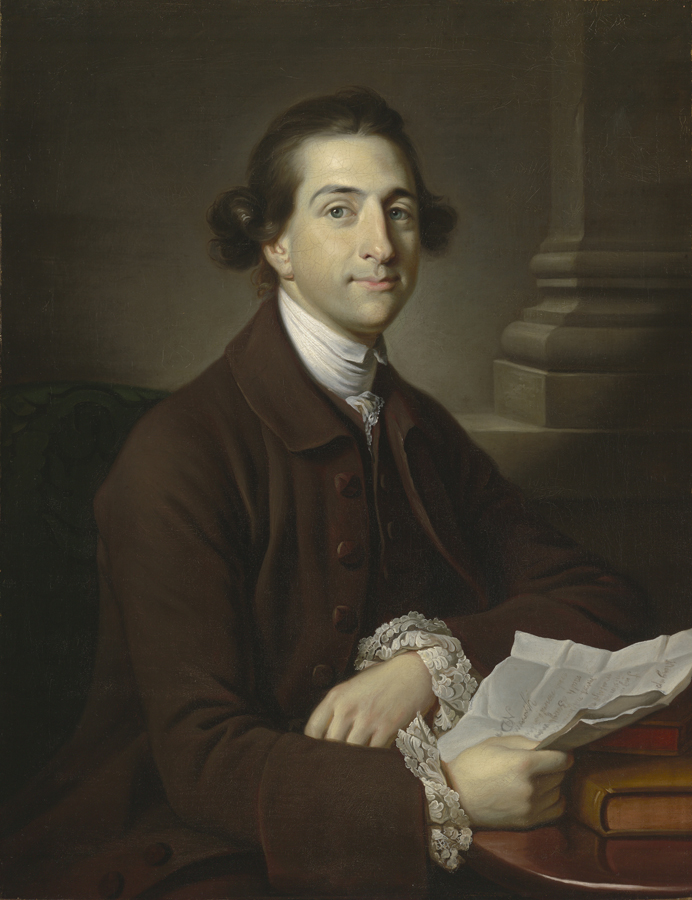
- Portrait by Nathaniel Dance-Holland

Prime Minister of Great Britain
- In office 14 October 1768 – 28 January 1770
- Monarch: George III
- Preceded by: The Earl of Chatham
- Succeeded by: Lord North

First Lord of the Treasury
- In office 30 July 1766 – 28 January 1770
- Prime Minister: The Earl of Chatham Himself
- Preceded by: The Marquess of Rockingham
- Succeeded by: Lord North

Northern Secretary
- In office 12 July 1765 – 14 May 1766
- Prime Minister: The Marquess of Rockingham
- Preceded by: The Earl of Halifax
- Succeeded by: Henry Seymour Conway

Personal details
- Born: Augustus Henry FitzRoy; 28 September 1735
- Died: 14 March 1811 (aged 75) Euston, Suffolk, England
- Resting place: St Genevieve Churchyard, Euston, Suffolk, England
- Party: Whig
- Spouses: Anne Liddell (m. 1756; div. 1769) Elizabeth Wrottesley (m. 1769)
- Children: 12; including George, Charles, William and John
- Parent: Lord Augustus FitzRoy (father)
- Education: Peterhouse, Cambridge

Augustus Henry FitzRoy, 3rd Duke of Grafton (28 September 1735 – 14 March 1811), styled Earl of Euston between 1747 and 1757, was a British Whig statesman of the Georgian era. He is one of a handful of dukes who have served as prime minister.

He became prime minister in 1768 at the age of 33, leading the supporters of William Pitt, and was the youngest person to hold the office until the appointment of William Pitt the Younger 15 years later. However, he struggled to demonstrate an ability to counter increasing challenges to Britain's global dominance following the nation's victory in the Seven Years' War. He was widely attacked for allowing France to annex Corsica, and stepped down in 1770, handing over power to Lord North.

== Background and education ==
Fitzroy was born on 28 September 1735. He was a son of Lord Augustus FitzRoy, a captain in the Royal Navy, and Elizabeth Cosby, the daughter of Colonel William Cosby, who served as a colonial Governor of New York. Lord Augustus was the third son of the 2nd Duke of Grafton and Lady Henrietta Somerset, which made FitzRoy a great-grandson of both the 1st Duke of Grafton and the Marquess of Worcester. He was notably a fourth-generation descendant of King Charles II and the 1st Duchess of Cleveland; the surname FitzRoy stems from this illegitimacy. His younger brother was the 1st Baron Southampton. Following the death of his uncle in 1747, he was styled Earl of Euston as his grandfather's heir apparent.

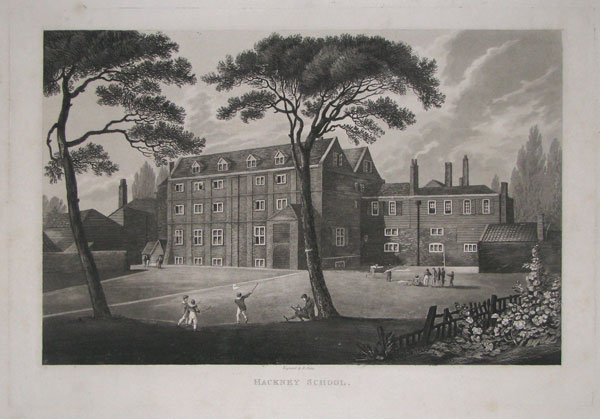
Euston was educated at Newcome's School (pictured)

As Lord Euston, he went to live at Wakefield. As a boy, he met the prominent Whig statesman William Pitt the Elder at Stowe House, the seat of Lord Cobham and felt a deep sense of admiration for him. Lord Euston was educated at Newcome's School in Hackney and at Westminster School, made the Grand Tour, and obtained a degree at Peterhouse, Cambridge. Following his education, Lord Euston embarked on the Grand Tour across Europe. In 1754, he returned to England.

== Political career ==
In 1756, he entered Parliament as MP for Boroughbridge, a pocket borough; several months later, he switched constituencies to Bury St Edmunds, which was controlled by his family. However, a year later, his grandfather died, and he succeeded as the 3rd Duke of Grafton, which elevated him to the House of Lords.

Grafton was immediately created the Lord Lieutenant of Suffolk and served in that capacity from 1757 to 1763, when he was dismissed by Lord Bute. He would again serve in that position from 1769 to 1790. In November 1756, he was appointed lord of the bedchamber to the Prince of Wales but he resigned from the post in June 1758.

He first became known in politics as an opponent of Lord Bute, a favourite of King George III. Grafton aligned himself with the Duke of Newcastle against Lord Bute, whose term as prime minister was short-lived largely because it was felt that the peace terms to which he had agreed at the Treaty of Paris were not a sufficient return for Britain's performance in the Seven Years' War.

In 1765, Grafton was appointed a Privy Counsellor; then, following discussions with William Pitt the Elder, he was appointed Northern Secretary in Lord Rockingham's first government. However, Rockingham retired the following year, and Pitt (by then Lord Chatham) formed a ministry in which Grafton was First Lord of the Treasury but not the prime minister.

The ministry that assumed office was composed of a diverse coalition, including supporters of the King, followers of Chatham, and members of the official Whig faction. Initially, it maintained a fragile unity but was widely regarded as a temporary arrangement. Shortly after its formation, Chatham fell ill and withdrew to Bath, ceasing to participate in government affairs or communicate with his colleagues. By March 1767, the direction of government had passed to Grafton, marking the end of Chatham's administration.

On 20 September 1769, he was appointed a Knight of the Order of the Garter.

=== Prime minister ===
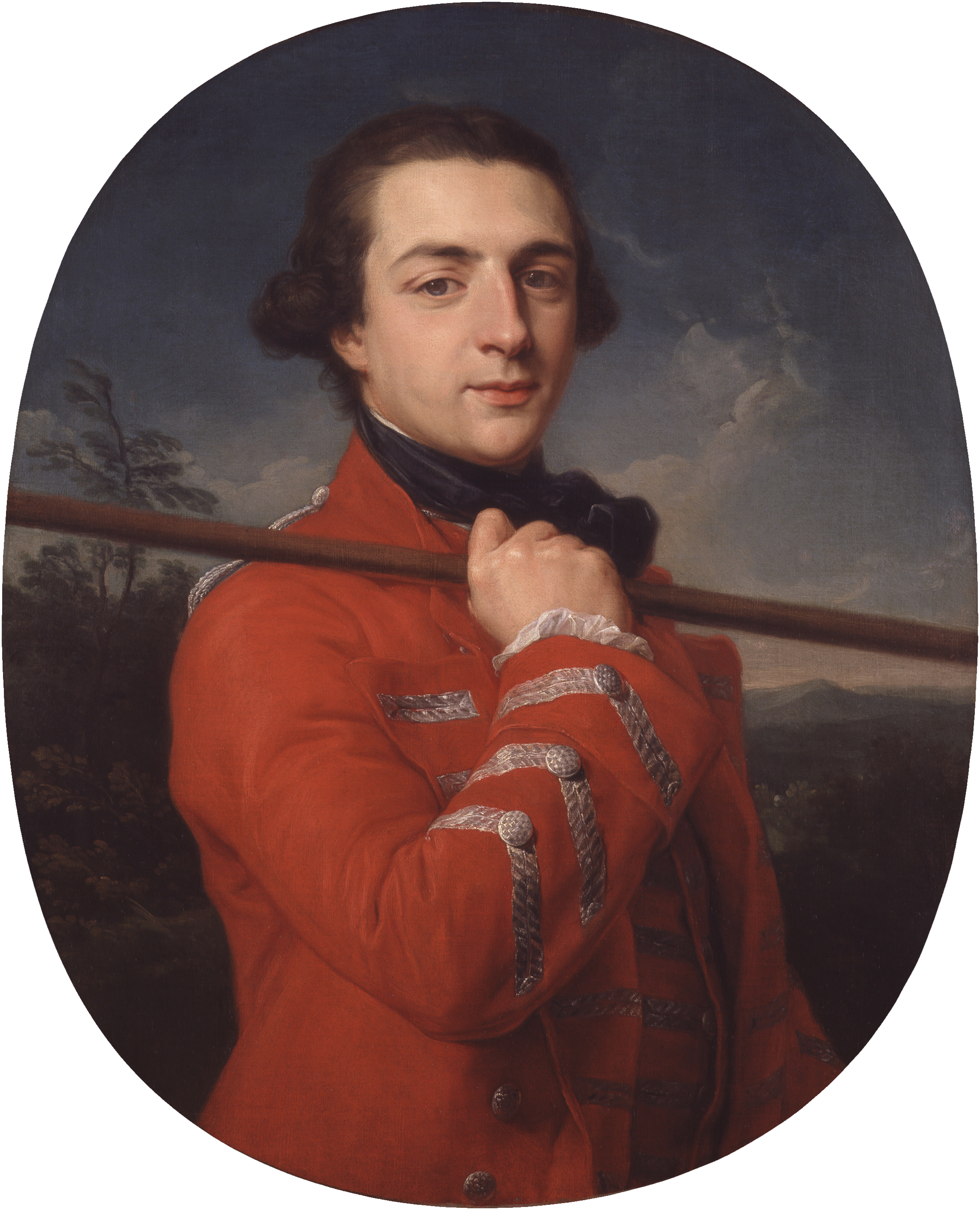
Portrait of the Duke of Grafton (1762) by Pompeo Batoni. Grafton is shown in the uniform of a West Suffolk Militia colonel.

Chatham's illness, at the end of 1767, resulted in Grafton becoming the government's effective leader (he is credited with entering the office of prime minister in 1768), but political differences, the impact of the Corsican Crisis and the attacks of "Junius" led to his resignation in January 1770. Also, in 1768, Grafton became Chancellor of Cambridge University. He became Lord Privy Seal in Lord North's ministry (1771) but resigned in 1775, being in favour of conciliatory action towards the American colonists. In the second Rockingham ministry of 1782, he was again Lord Privy Seal and continued in the post in the following Shelburne ministry until March 1783.

== Militia career ==
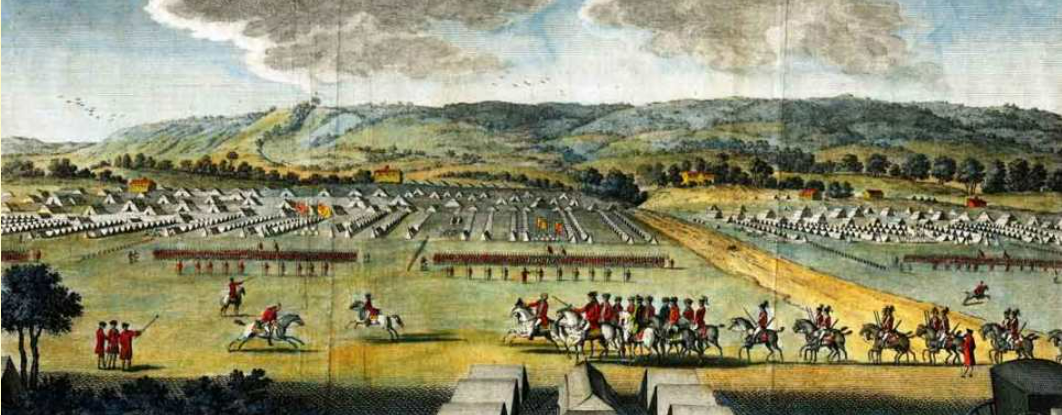
Coxheath Camp in 1778

Grafton was a strong supporter of moves to reform the militia during the Seven Years' War, and as Lord Lieutenant of Suffolk his county was one of the first to raise its quota, in two regiments on 27 April 1759. He soon took personal command of the West Suffolk Militia as its Colonel. The militia remained on active service until 1762. The militia was called out again after the outbreak of the War of American Independence when Britain was threatened with invasion by the Americans' allies, France and Spain. On 26 March 1778, Grafton was ordered to embody the two regiments once more. In that summer, the West Suffolks under Grafton formed part of a concentration at Coxheath Camp, near Maidstone in Kent, which was the army's largest training camp. The duke was chosen to train the grenadier companies of all the battalions in camp, and he worked them hard, 7–8 hours a day. Observers of the camp noted that the discipline of the West Suffolk Militia under Grafton was especially good. He resigned his commission on grounds of ill-health in February 1780, and his 20-year-old son and heir, George, Earl of Euston, succeeded him as colonel of the West Suffolk Militia.

== Religious interests ==
In later years Grafton was a prominent Unitarian, being one of the early members of the inaugural Essex Street Chapel under Rev. Theophilus Lindsey when it was founded in 1774. Grafton had associated with a number of liberal Anglican theologians when at Cambridge, and devoted much time to theological study and writing after leaving office as prime minister. In 1773, in the House of Lords, he supported a bill to release Anglican clergy from subscribing to all the Thirty-nine Articles. He became a supporter of moral reform among the wealthy and of changes to the church. He was the author of:

- Hints Submitted to the Serious Attention of the Clergy, Nobility and Gentry, by a Layman (1789).
- Serious Reflections of a Rational Christian from 1788–1797.

He was a sponsor of Richard Watson's Consideration of the Expediency of Revising the Liturgy and Articles of the Church of England (published in 1790), and he funded the printing of 700 copies of Griesbach's edition of the Greek New Testament in 1796.

== Horseracing ==
The Duke also had horse racing interests. His racing colours were sky blue, with a black cap.

== Legacy ==
Grafton County, New Hampshire, in the United States, is named in his honour, as is the city of Grafton, New South Wales, Australia, the town of Grafton, New York, the unincorporated community of Grafton, Virginia, and possibly the township (since 1856 a city) of Grafton, West Virginia. The Grafton Centre Shopping Mall in Cambridge is also named after him and indeed lies on Fitzroy Street. Cape Grafton in Far North Queensland was named after him by Lieutenant James Cook during his first voyage of discovery.

Grafton had the longest post-premiership of any prime minister in British history, totalling 41 years and 45 days.

== Family ==
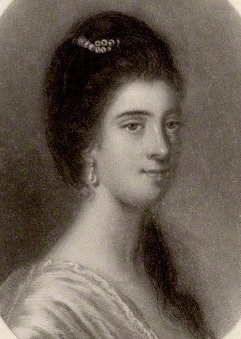
Grafton's first wife, Anne Liddell

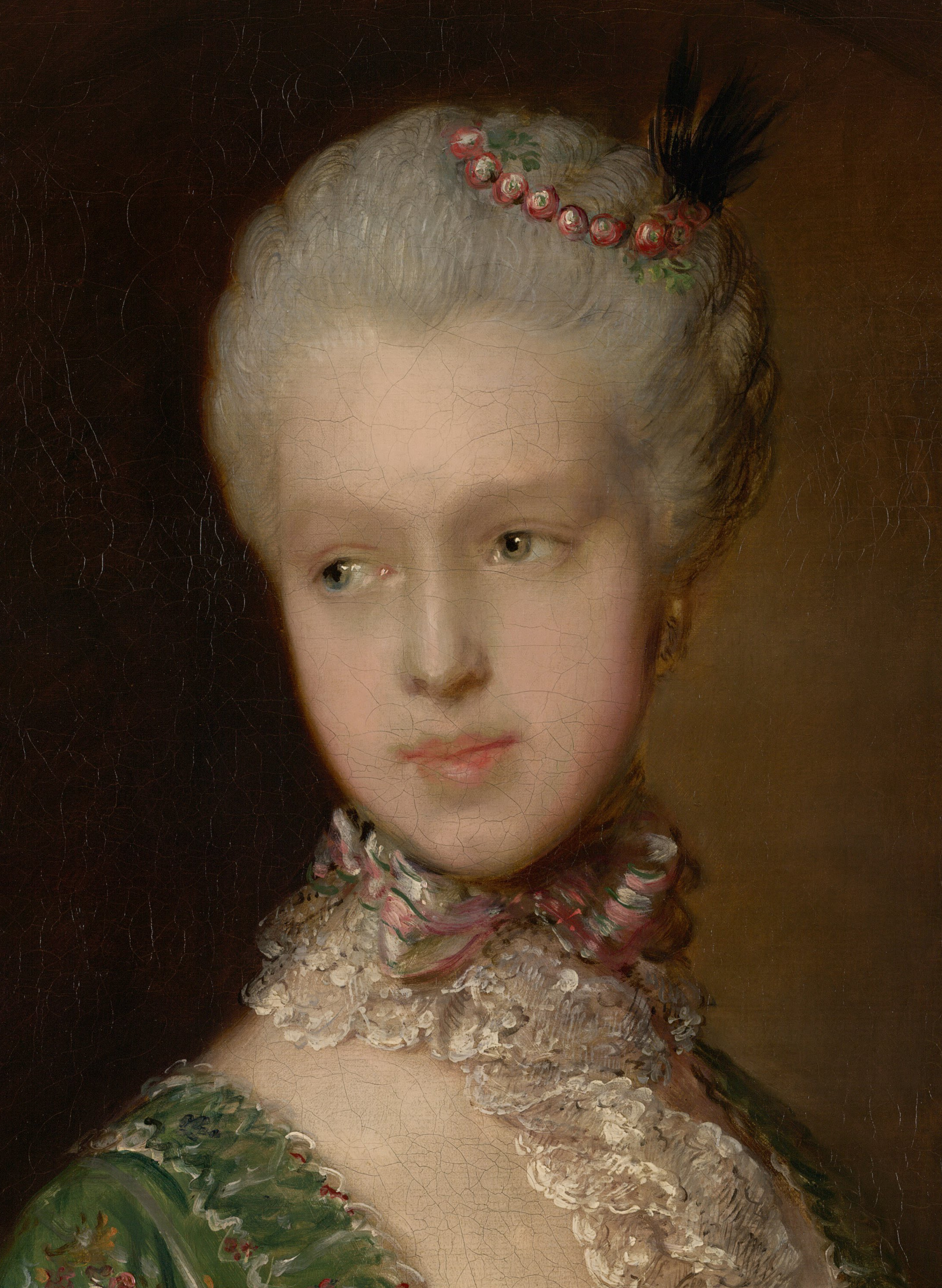
Grafton's second wife, Elizabeth Wrottesley

On 29 January 1756, he married The Hon. Anne Liddell, daughter of Henry Liddell, 1st Baron Ravensworth (1708–1784), at Lord Ravensworth's house in St James's Square, by licence. The marriage was witnessed by Lord Ravensworth and Francis Seymour-Conway, 1st Earl of Hertford.

Augustus and Anne had three children:

- Lady Georgiana FitzRoy (8 May 1757 – 18 January 1799), who married John Smyth (12 February 1748 – 12 February 1811) on 4 June 1778. They were the parents of John Henry Smyth.
- George Henry FitzRoy, 4th Duke of Grafton (1760–1844)
- General Lord Charles FitzRoy (14 July 1764 – 20 December 1829), who married, firstly, Frances Mundy (1773 – 9 August 1797) on 20 June 1795, and had one son. He married, secondly, Lady Frances Stewart (24 June 1777 – 9 February 1810) on 10 March 1799 and had three children. His sons Sir Charles FitzRoy (1796–1858), governor of New South Wales, and Robert FitzRoy, the hydrographer, were notable for their achievements.

In 1764, the Duke had a very public affair with the courtesan Nancy Parsons whom he kept at his townhouse and took to the opera, where they allegedly were found in flagrante delicto. This brazen lack of convention offended society's standards. After the Duchess had become pregnant by her own lover, the Earl of Upper Ossory, she and the Duke were divorced by Act of Parliament, passed 23 March 1769. Three months later, on 24 June 1769, the Duke married Elizabeth Wrottesley (1 November 1745 – 25 May 1822), daughter of the Reverend Sir Richard Wrottesley, Dean of Worcester. They had the following children:

- Lord Henry FitzRoy (9 April 1770 – 7 June 1828), clergyman; he married Caroline Pigot (died 1 January 1835) on 10 September 1800 and had five children. Ancestor of Daisy Greville, Countess of Warwick; Millicent Sutherland-Leveson-Gower, Duchess of Sutherland; James St Clair-Erskine, 5th Earl of Rosslyn; Sybil Fane, Countess of Westmorland; Lady Angela Forbes; and Ivy Cavendish-Bentinck, Duchess of Portland.
- Lord Frederick FitzRoy (born 16 September 1774; died young).
- Lady Augusta FitzRoy (1779 – 29 June 1839), who married Rev. George F. Tavel (died 1829) on 19 November 1811.
- Lady Frances FitzRoy (1 June 1780 – 7 January 1866), who married the 1st Baron Churchill on 25 November 1800. They were the parents of Francis Spencer, 2nd Baron Churchill and Augustus Spencer, and the maternal grandparents of Luke Dillon, 4th Baron Clonbrock.
- Admiral Lord William FitzRoy (1 June 1782 – 13 May 1857), who married Georgiana Raikes (died 2 December 1861) in 1816 and had two children.
- Lord John Edward FitzRoy (24 September 1785 – 28 December 1856), MP, died unmarried.
- Lady Charlotte FitzRoy (died 23 June 1857).
- Lady Elizabeth FitzRoy (died 13 March 1839), who married her cousin Lt. Gen. The Hon. William FitzRoy (1773–1837), son of the 1st Baron Southampton, on 4 July 1811.
- Lady Isabella FitzRoy (died 10 December 1866), who married Barrington Pope Blachford (3 December 1783 – 14 May 1816) on 11 August 1812.

Grafton is thus the first British prime minister before Anthony Eden (and one of only three) to have been divorced, and the second, after Robert Walpole, to marry while in office. Grafton would be the only prime minister to divorce and remarry while in office until Boris Johnson in 2021. FitzRoy died on 14 March 1811.

== Arms ==
Coat of arms of Augustus FitzRoy, 3rd Duke of Grafton
Coronet The coronet of a Duke Crest On a Chapeau Gules turned up Ermine a Lion statant guardant Or ducally crowned Azure and gorged with a Collar counter-compony Argent and of the fourth. Escutcheon The Royal Arms of Charles II, viz Quarterly: 1st and 4th, France and England quarterly; 2nd, Scotland; 3rd, Ireland; the whole debruised by a Baton sinister compony of six pieces Argent and Azure Supporters Dexter: a Lion guardant Or ducally crowned Azure; Sinister: a Greyhound Argent, each gorged with a Collar counter-compony Argent and Azure. Motto Et Decus Et Pretium Recti (The ornament and recompense of virtue)

== Cabinet of the Duke of Grafton ==
Portfolio	Minister	Took office	Left office	Party
First Lord of the Treasury	Augustus FitzRoy, 3rd Duke of Grafton (head of ministry)	14 October 1768	28 January 1770	Whig
Lord Chancellor	Charles Pratt, 1st Baron Camden	30 July 1766	17 January 1770	Whig
Lord Chancellor	Charles Yorke	17 January 1770	20 January 1770	Independent
Lord President of the Council	Granville Leveson-Gower, 2nd Earl Gower	22 December 1767	24 November 1779	Tory
Lord Privy Seal	George Hervey, 2nd Earl of Bristol	1768	1770	Independent
Chancellor of the Exchequer; Leader of the House of Commons	Frederick North, Lord North	11 September 1767	27 March 1782	Tory
Secretary of State for the Northern Department	Thomas Thynne, 3rd Viscount Weymouth	20 January 1768	21 October 1768	Tory
Secretary of State for the Northern Department	William Nassau de Zuylestein, 4th Earl of Rochford	21 October 1768	19 December 1770	Independent
Secretary of State for the Southern Department	William Petty, 2nd Earl of Shelburne	30 July 1766	20 October 1768	Whig
Secretary of State for the Southern Department	Thomas Thynne, 3rd Viscount Weymouth	21 October 1768	12 December 1770	Tory
Secretary of State for the Colonies	Wills Hill, 1st Earl of Hillsborough	27 February 1768	27 August 1772	Independent
First Lord of the Admiralty	Sir Edward Hawke	1766	1771	Independent
Master-General of the Ordnance	John Manners, Marquess of Granby	14 May 1763	18 October 1770	Independent
Minister without Portfolio	Henry Seymour Conway	1768	1770	Whig

== Bibliography ==
- Bigham, Clive (1929). The prime ministers of Britain, 1721-1921; with a supplementary chapter to 1924.
- Durrant, Peter (2004). Oxford Dictionary of National Biography. Vol. 19. Oxford University Press. ISBN 978-0-19-861369-5.
- Hellicar, Eileen (1 January 1978). "Duke of Grafton (Augustus Henry Fitzroy)". Prime Ministers of Britain. David & Charles. ISBN 978-0-7153-7486-3.
- Stephen, Leslie (1889). Dictionary of National Biography. Smith, Elder & Company.
- Lt-Col E.A.H. Webb, History of the 12th (The Suffolk) Regiment 1685–1913, London: Spottiswoode, 1914/Uckfield: Naval & Military, 2001, ISBN 978-1-84342-116-0.
- J.R. Western, The English Militia in the Eighteenth Century: The Story of a Political Issue 1660–1802, London: Routledge & Kegan Paul, 1965.

Political offices
Preceded by The Earl of Sandwich	Secretary of State for the Northern Department; 1765–1766	Succeeded by Henry Seymour Conway
Preceded by The Marquess of Rockingham	First Lord of the Treasury; 1766–1770	Succeeded by Lord North
Preceded by The Marquess of Rockingham	Leader of the House of Lords; 1766–1770	Succeeded by The Viscount Weymouth
Preceded by The Earl of Chatham	Prime Minister of Great Britain; 14 October 1768 – 28 January 1770	Succeeded by Lord North
Preceded by The Earl of Suffolk and Berkshire	Lord Privy Seal; 1771–1775	Succeeded by The Earl of Dartmouth
Preceded by The Earl of Dartmouth	Lord Privy Seal; 1782–1783	Succeeded by The Earl of Carlisle
Parliament of Great Britain
Preceded by William Murray; Sir Cecil Bisshopp, Bt	Member of Parliament for Boroughbridge; 1756–1757; Served alongside: Sir Cecil Bisshopp, Bt	Succeeded by Sir Cecil Bisshopp, Bt; Thomas Thoroton
Preceded by Viscount Petersham; Felton Hervey	Member of Parliament for Bury St Edmunds; 1756–1757; Served alongside: Felton Hervey	Succeeded by Felton Hervey; Augustus Hervey
Honorary titles
Preceded by The Duke of Grafton	Lord Lieutenant of Suffolk; 1757–1763	Succeeded by The Lord Maynard
Preceded by The Viscount Maynard	Lord Lieutenant of Suffolk; 1769–1790	Succeeded by Earl of Euston
Academic offices
Preceded by The Duke of Newcastle	Chancellor of the University of Cambridge; 1768–1811	Succeeded by The Duke of Gloucester and Edinburgh
Peerage of England
Preceded by Charles FitzRoy	Duke of Grafton; 1757–1811	Succeeded by George FitzRoy
