= Sir Richard Wrottesley, 7th Baronet =

Richard Wrottesley
- Born: 19 June 1721; Wrottesley Hall, Staffordshire, England
- Died: 20 July 1769 (aged 48); England
- Education: St John's College, Oxford; Matric. 31 August 1739
- Known for: Member of Parliament; Dean of Worcester
- Spouse: Lady Mary Leveson-Gower (1717–1778)
- Children: Mary Wrottesley (1740–1769); Frances Wrottesley (1743–1811); John Wrottesley (1744–1787); Elizabeth Wrottesley (1745–1822); Dorothy Wrottesley (1747); Harriet Wrottesley (1754–1824)
- Parent(s): Sir John Wrottesley; Frances Grey

Sir Richard Wrottesley, 7th Baronet (19 June 1721 – 20 July 1769) of Wrottesley Hall in Staffordshire, was a Member of Parliament, Anglican clergyman and Dean of Worcester.

== Biography ==
He was born a younger son of Sir John Wrottesley Bt MP, by Frances, the daughter of the Hon. John Grey MP of Enville. He was educated at Winchester College (1736–38) and St John's College, Oxford (1739). He did not graduate at Oxford, but later graduated at Cambridge (admitted to St John's College, Cambridge and graduated M.A. in 1756; admitted to Queens' College, Cambridge and graduated LL.D. in 1764).

He succeeded his elder brother Sir Walter Wrottesley as baronet in 1732.

It is said that when Bonnie Prince Charlie was marching south through England during the course of his rebellion, Sir Richard, a regular duellist, armed his tenants and gathered his servants to do battle but he reportedly never got further than a local inn, The Bull at Codsall, where his small team of men spent a convivial week.

He became M.P. for Tavistock in December 1747, holding the seat until 1754. He was appointed a Clerk of the Green Cloth from 1749 to 1754.

He became a Church official, being appointed minister of St Michael's in Tettenhall. He was appointed chaplain in ordinary to the King, George III, in 1763 and collated Dean of Worcester for life in 1765.

He married Lady Mary Leveson-Gower, the daughter of John Leveson-Gower, 1st Earl Gower and Evelyn Pierrepont, in 1739.

He died in 1769.

== See also ==
- Baron Wrottesley, and The Wrottesley Baronetcy

Parliament of Great Britain
Preceded by Richard Leveson-Gower; Thomas Brand	Member of Parliament for Tavistock; 1747–1754; With: Thomas Brand	Succeeded by Jeffrey French; Richard Rigby
Church of England titles
Preceded by John Waugh	Dean of Worcester; 1765–1769	Succeeded by William Digby
Baronetage of England
Preceded by Walter Wrottesley	Baronet (of Wrottesley); 1731–1769	Succeeded by John Wrottesley
