= Campaigns of 1794 of the French Revolutionary Wars =

1794 military campaign

The French Revolutionary Wars continued from 1793 with few immediate changes in the diplomatic situation as France fought the First coalition.

On the Alpine frontier, there was little change, with the French invasion of Piedmont failing. On the Spanish border, the French under General Dugommier rallied from their defensive positions at Bayonne and Perpignan, driving the Spanish out of Roussillon and invading Catalonia. Dugommier was killed in the Battle of the Black Mountain in November.

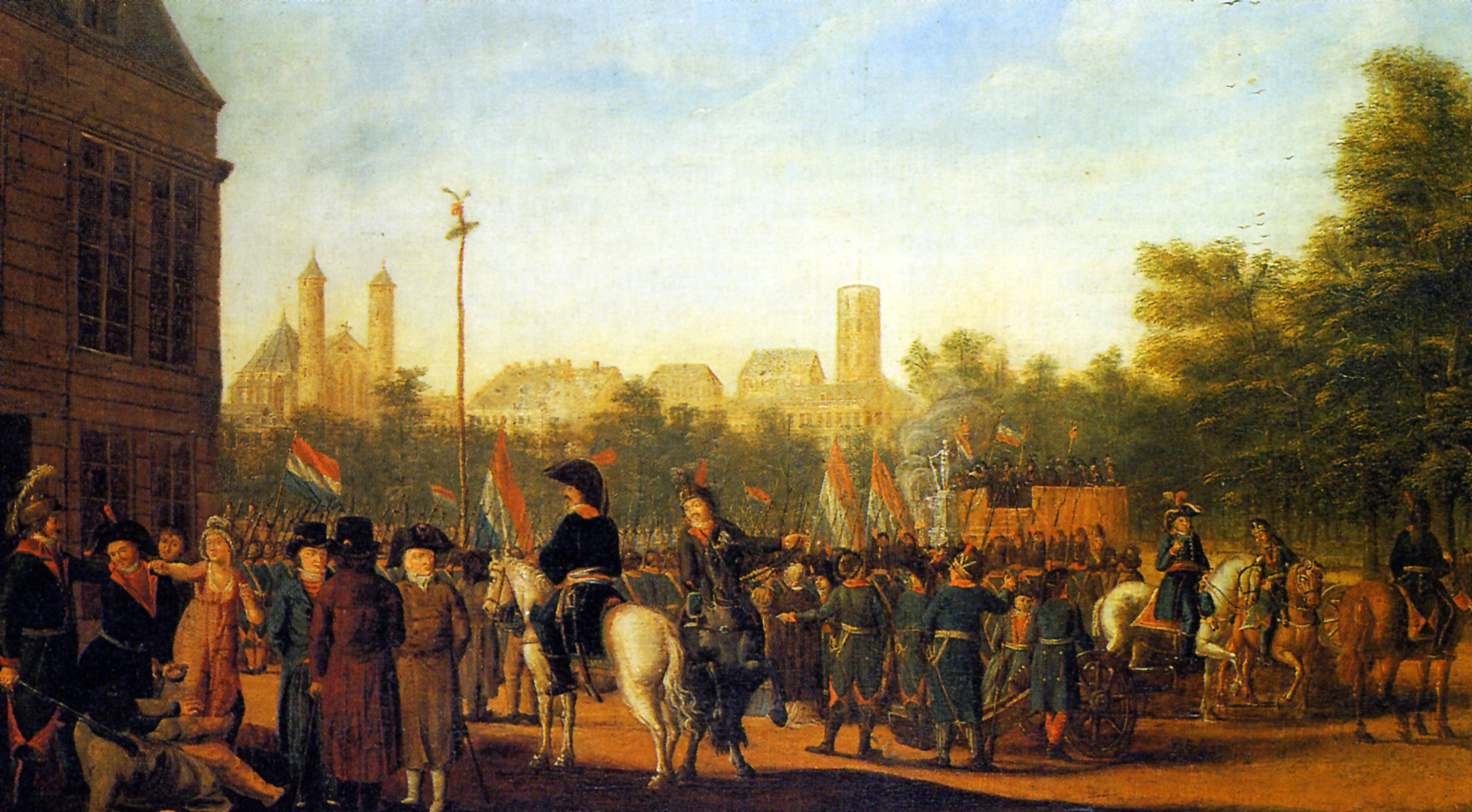
French forces raise the cap of liberty in the Neumarkt, Cologne, 1794

On the northern front in the Flanders Campaign, the Austrians and French both prepared offensives in Belgium, with the Austrians besieging Landrecies and advancing towards Mons and Maubeuge. The French prepared an offensive on multiple fronts, with two armies in Flanders under Pichegru and Moreau, and Jourdan attacking from the German border. The French withstood several damaging but inconclusive actions before regaining the initiative at the battles of Kortrijk, Tourcoing and Fleurus in June. The French armies drove the Austrians, British, and Dutch beyond the Rhine, occupying Belgium, the Rhineland, and the south of the Netherlands.

On the middle Rhine front in July General Michaud's Army of the Rhine attempted two offensives in July in the Vosges, the second of which was successful, but not followed up allowing for a Prussian counter-attack in September. Otherwise this sector of the front was largely quiet over the course of the year.

At sea, the French Atlantic Fleet succeeded in holding off a British attempt to interdict a vital cereal convoy from the United States on the First of June, though at the cost of one quarter of its strength. In the Caribbean, the British fleet landed in Martinique in February, taking the whole island by 24 March and holding it until the Peace of Amiens, and in Guadeloupe in April, where they captured the island briefly but were driven out by Victor Hugues later in the year. In the Mediterranean, following the British evacuation of Toulon, the Corsican leader Pasquale Paoli agreed with admiral Samuel Hood to place Corsica under British protection in return for assistance capturing French garrisons at Saint-Florent, Bastia, and Calvi, creating the short-lived Anglo-Corsican Kingdom.

By the end of the year French armies had won victories on all fronts, and as the year closed they began advancing into the Netherlands.

== See also ==
- Kościuszko Uprising (which some of the allies were involved in suppressing)
- War in the Vendée

Preceded by 1793	French Revolutionary Wars; 1794	Succeeded by 1795
