= Joseph Bullen =

Royal Navy Admiral (1761–1857)

Admiral Joseph Bullen
- Born: 14 April 1761
- Died: 17 July 1857 (aged 96); Bath, Somerset
- Military career
- Allegiance: Great Britain; United Kingdom
- Branch: Royal Navy
- Service years: 1774–1810
- Rank: Admiral of the White
- Commands: HMS Mulette; HMS Proselyte; HMS Scourge; HMS Alexander
- Conflicts: American Revolutionary War; Battle of Red Bank; Siege of Fort Mifflin; Battle of Grenada; San Juan Expedition; Battle of the Saintes; French Revolutionary Wars; Siege of Toulon; Napoleonic Wars

Admiral Joseph Bullen (14 April 1761 – 17 July 1857) was an officer of the British Royal Navy who served during the American Revolutionary, French Revolutionary and Napoleonic Wars.

== Biography ==
Bullen was the second son of the Reverend John Bullen, Rector of Kennett, Cambridge, and of Rushmoor-cum-Newburn, Suffolk, and entered the Navy in November 1774 as a midshipman, on board the 36-gun frigate Pallas, commanded by Captain The Honourable William Cornwallis. He followed Cornwallis into the 50-gun ship Isis, and was present at the Battle of Red Bank and siege of Fort Mifflin, in October and November 1777. Under Cornwallis he then served in the 50-gun ships Bristol, and Chatham, and 64-gun ship Lion, in which he took part in the Battle of Grenada on 6 July 1779. Bullen was promoted to lieutenant on 6 March 1778, and shortly afterwards joined the 28-gun Hinchinbrook, commanded by Captain Horatio Nelson, and was present during the attack on Fort St. Juan during the San Juan Expedition of 1780. He then returned to Lion, under Cornwallis, and was lent to the 90-gun ship Prince George, Captain John Williams, and participated as officer in charge of half the middle gun-deck in the Battle of the Saintes on 12 April 1782.

His subsequent appointments were to the Carnatic on 2 May 1785, and then the Bombay Castle on 6 July 1786, both 74's stationed as guardships at Plymouth, commanded by Captain Anthony Molloy. On 16 June 1790, he moved to the Monarch, under Captain Peter Rainier, fitting out at Spithead for the East Indies.

On 6 February 1793, soon after the outbreak of war with France, he was appointed to the 64-gun Agamemnon, Captain Horatio Nelson, and was actively employed in the Mediterranean. On 11 September 1793 he moved to the Victory, flagship of Lord Hood at the siege of Toulon. For three weeks Bullen commanded "Fort Mulgrave", a battery mounted opposite the town, and on 20 November 1793 was appointed commander of the 20-gun sloop Mulette. That vessel being absent at the time, he was appointed acting-captain of the 36-gun frigate Proselyte, employed as a floating battery. When the British finally evacuated Toulon, Proselyte brought out 300 Spanish and Neapolitan troops.

In March 1794, during the early part of the Siege of Bastia, Bullen served as a volunteer under Captain Walter Serocold, who had superseded him as commander of Proselyte. Towards the end of the operation he commanded an advanced battery. Bullen was invalided out in July 1794, not returning to duty until early 1796, serving first as a volunteer in Santa Margarita under Captain Thomas Byam Martin, and distinguishing himself during the recapture of the Tamise. He then, with the rank of commander, served as captain of the sloop Scourge, and as acting-captain of the ship Alexander.

Bullen was advanced to the rank of post-captain on 24 November 1796, but was unable to obtain a ship. He served as the commander of the Lyme Regis district of the Sea Fencibles from 26 September 1804 until 1810, when the Corps was disbanded, and afterwards remained on half-pay. He was promoted to rear-admiral on 12 August 1819, to vice-admiral on 12 November 1840, and to admiral on 23 November 1841.

Admiral Bullen died at Bath, Somerset on 17 July 1857.

== Personal life ==
In 1801 he married Margaret Ann, only daughter of W. Seafe of Durham, barrister-at-law.
