= Siege of Bastia =

Siege of the War of the First Coalition

Coordinates: 42°42′03″N 9°27′25″E

- Part of the invasion of Corsica
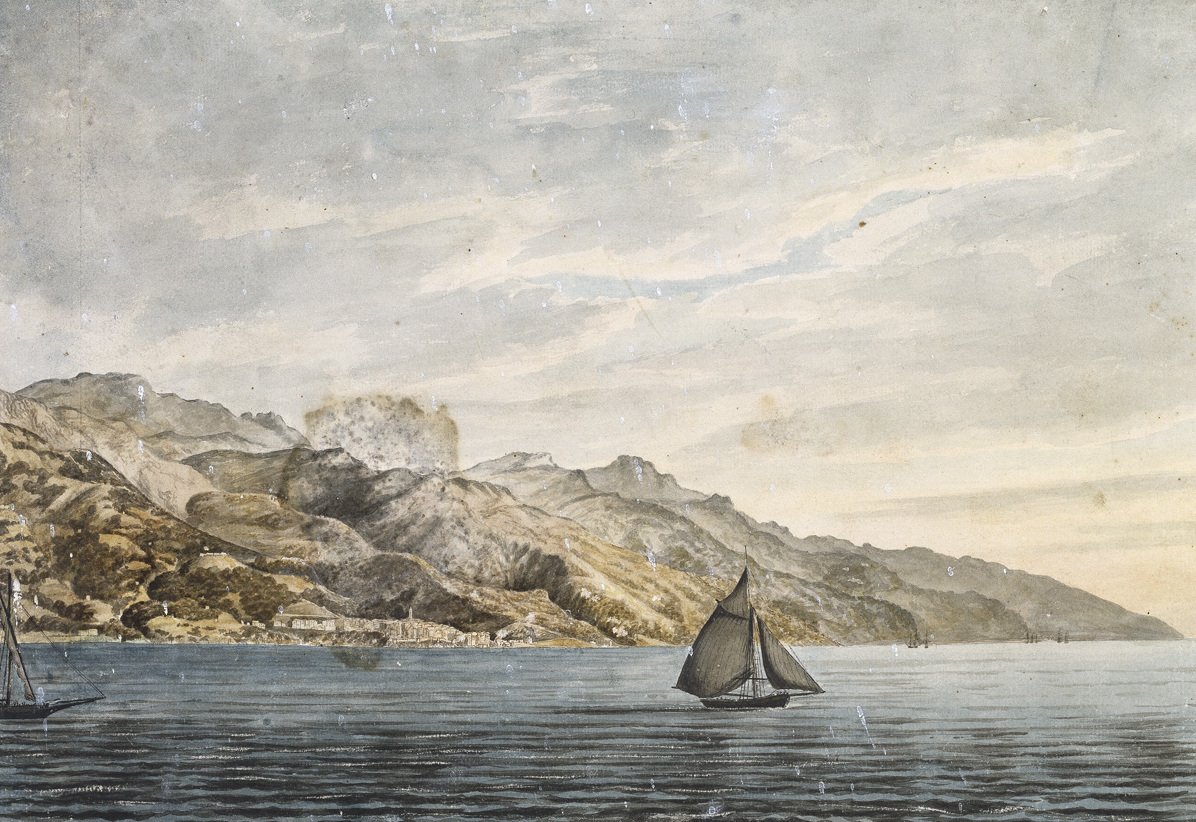
- A Southern View of Bastia in the Island of Corsica from on board His Majesty's ship Victory during the Siege of that Town in May 1794; Ralph Willett Miller, c. 1795
Date	4 April – 22 May 1794
Location	Bastia, Corsica
Result	Anglo-Corsican victory

Belligerents
Great Britain; Corsica	France

Commanders and leaders
(Kingdom of Great Britain) Lord Hood (Kingdom of Great Britain) Horatio Nelson (Corsica) Pasquale Paoli	(French First Republic) Jean-Pierre Lacombe-Saint-Michel

Strength
2,400; Mediterranean Fleet	5,000

Casualties and losses
14 killed 34 wounded 6 missing 1 floating battery destroyed	700 killed or wounded 1 corvette captured

The siege of Bastia was a combined British and Corsican military operation during the early stages of the French Revolutionary Wars. The Corsican people had risen up against the French garrison of the island in 1793, and sought support from the British Royal Navy's Mediterranean Fleet under Lord Hood. After initial delays in the autumn, Hood had supplied a small expeditionary force which had successfully driven the French out of the port of San Fiorenzo in February 1794. Hood then turned his attention to the nearby town of Bastia, which was held by a large French garrison.

The attack was delayed by an unedifying squabble between the British commanders over the best method to approach the siege; Hood, supported by Captain Horatio Nelson, was over-confident and assumed the town would fall by assault and bombardment in just ten days. The French positions were however far stronger than Hood had assumed and in the end the siege lasted for six weeks, the garrison only forced to surrender when its food reserves ran out. Hood permitted the garrison safe passage back to France and began preparations for the assault of the final French-held town on the island, at Calvi. By August 1794, the last of the French had been driven from Corsica, which had become a self-governing part of the British Empire with a new constitution.

== Background ==
In the aftermath of the French Revolution of 1789 the Corsican leader Pasquale Paoli, who had left in 1768 after the French invasion of Corsica, returned to the island, defeated his political rivals and took control. Paoli then faced efforts by the French National Convention to take control over Corsica, and in 1793 orders were issued for his arrest during the Reign of Terror. Paoli had long been supported by Great Britain, and as his supporters formed irregular units and drove the French garrison into three fortified port-towns on the northern coast, San Fiorenzo, Calvi, and Bastia, Paoli appealed to British agents in Italy for support.

The French positions were too strong for attack by Paoli's irregulars, and could be easily resupplied and reinforced by sea. Paoli therefore requested support from the British Mediterranean Fleet in the summer of 1793. The British however, under the command of Admiral Lord Hood, were fully engaged in the siege of Toulon and could spare few forces to assist Paoli. A British squadron was sent to attack San Fiorenzo in October, but was driven off by shore defences with heavy casualties. The French were then able to land significant reinforcements on the island in November and even conduct some local offensives against the Corsican forces. In December 1793, the French Republican armies were able to retake Toulon, forcing a hasty and chaotic retreat by the British fleet in which almost half of the French Mediterranean Fleet was recaptured intact and more than 7,000 refugees had to be extracted.

British planners had considered Corsica a suitable forward base in the Mediterranean for some time, although previous approaches to Paoli had gone unanswered. With the loss of Toulon, Hood needed a forward operating base in the Ligurian Sea, and turned his full attention to the island. In February he agreed with Paoli that in exchange for driving the French out of Corsica, the island would become a self-governing part of the British Empire, and sent a small force to attack San Fiorenzo. Initial attacks on coastal towers suffered casualties, but careful engineer operations, overseen by Lieutenant-Colonel John Moore, enabled the situation of artillery batteries on the heights over the town and after a short siege the French abandoned the town on 20 February, the surviving garrison retreating over the Serra Mountains to Bastia.

== Argumentative delay ==
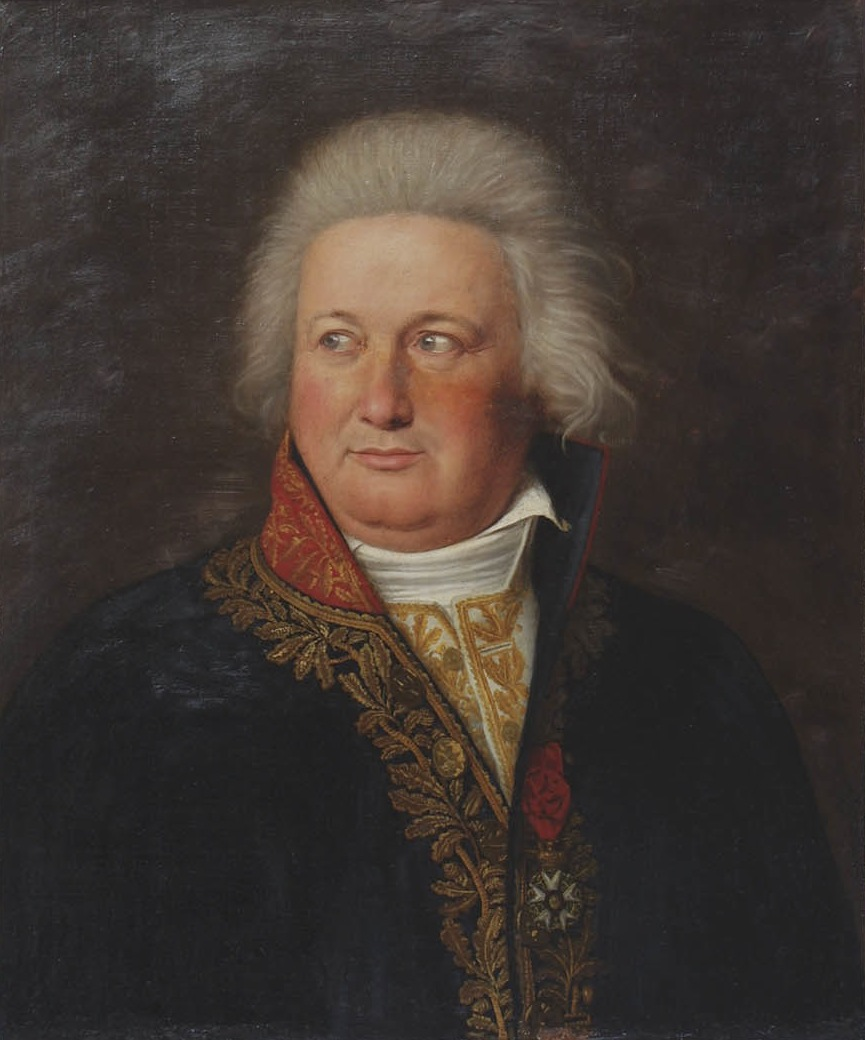
Portrait of Jean-Pierre Lacombe-Saint-Michel

On 19 February, British Captain Horatio Nelson landed a force of sailors to reconnoitre Bastia, returning with an optimistic report on its state of readiness. As a result, the French garrison in the town, augmented by the remains of the San Fiorenzo garrison, believed that the British would make an immediate attack on the town, and established defensive positions in the mountain passes through which they had retreated. The French began preparations to evacuate Bastia by sea, but when the British did not attack for three days the town's commander, Brigade-general Jean-Pierre Lacombe-Saint-Michel, halted the evacuation and instead set his men to improving the town's defences in anticipation of the inevitable siege. The town was large, heavily fortified and within easy reach of sympathetic Italian ports. Moreover, the French garrison was strong, consisting of 1,000 regular soldiers, 1,500 National Guardsmen and up to 2,500 Corsican militiamen.

The British had sent Corsican irregulars to probe the French defences, but the commander, David Dundas withdrew them a few days later due to the freezing conditions in the mountains. Hood's strategy to seize Corsica relied on speed, and rumours were spreading of a French relief force of 12,000 soldiers being prepared at Nice. The admiral felt that a demonstration of British naval strength might be sufficient to intimidate the French, and on 23 February took the Mediterranean Fleet on an extended cruise off Bastia, sailing around Cap Corse, reconnoitering the town and then returning to San Fiorenzo Bay on 5 March. There he found that Dundas had made no preparations for the coming siege. During this operation, Nelson had taken a squadron close inshore to study the seaward defences and exchanged fire with the shore batteries for two hours without a single shot striking his force.

Dundas was a cautious commander, who refused to send his force of 1,200 British soldiers from a patchwork of regiments and 2,000 untested Corsican irregulars against a French garrison he estimated to be more than 4,000 strong. He insisted that any attack must wait until reinforcements arrived from Gibraltar. Hood was furious, accusing Dundas of failing to press the attack and appealing to Dundas' junior officers, Lieutenant Colonels Moore and William Villettes. This was an egregious breach of the chain of command and when Moore told Dundas of Hood's overtures the British general was so furious that he and Hood exchanged a series of increasingly angry letters before resigning his post on 11 March, passing command to Colonel Abraham D'Aubant. Hood was unaware of the strength of the French garrison, assuming it to be far lower, partially on the advice of Nelson. Nelson however was well aware of the true size of the French force, and apparently withheld the information from his command in the hope of ensuring a frontal assault on the town.

D'Aubant was unpopular with both the Army and the Navy; Moore described his superior as speaking "nonsense", and Nelson called his behaviour "a national disgrace". He refused to reconnoitre Bastia or to contemplate an assault without reinforcements. Hood commissioned several reports into the defences of the town, ignoring the report by Moore and Major George Koehler that accurately described the dangers of the town's defences and instead selecting a more optimistic report by a junior officer. Hood was confident that, once the attack was underway, the town would surrender within ten days, and ordered Villettes to land north of the town with his 1,200 men, supported by a detachment of naval gunners led by Captain Nelson.

== Siege ==
Villettes' force comprised detachments from the Royal Artillery and the 11th, 25th, 30th, 50th, and 69th Regiments of Foot alongside units of Royal Marines detached from the fleet. It was joined by Nelson's force of 250 sailors with eight 24-pounder long guns from HMS Agamemnon and four mortars sent from Naples. While the army forces laid preparations for operations against the town, Hood stationed his fleet in a semi-circle just offshore, with HMS Fortitude under Captain William Young at the centre. Inshore, Captain Benjamin Caldwell commanded a squadron of gunboats to enact a close blockade of the harbour. The frigate HMS Imperieuse under Captain William Wolesley was detached to blockade the island of Capraia, also in French hands and the site of large storehouses of food and ammunition, to prevent the garrison interfering in the siege or sending supplies to the defenders. The French made no effort to disrupt the landings or the subsequent siting of the batteries around the town.

By 11 April, Nelson had assembled the batteries on the heights overlooking the town. Hood then sent a message to Lacombe-Saint-Michel, advising him of the British positions and inviting him to surrender. The French commander simply responded "I have hot shot for your ships and bayonets for your troops. When two thirds of our troops are killed, I will then trust to the generosity of the English". His approach rebuffed, Hood ordered Nelson to open a heavy fire on the town's defences; the ensuing fire and counterfire between the British and French batteries has been described as "immense". Hood also ordered the 24-gun floating battery HMS Proselyte, a small ship captured from the French at the siege of Toulon and armed with 12-pounder cannon, to enter the harbour under Captain Walter Serocold and bombard the seaward defences. Serocold's ship shifted at anchor however and became exposed to heated shot from the town's batteries. A number of red-hot cannonballs lodged in the ship's stores and a fire started that rapidly blazed out of control. Serocold continued his fire on the town while calling for help from the fleet, managing to evacuate Proselyte into ship's boats and escape the harbour before the ship was destroyed by the flames.

For fourteen days, Nelson's batteries kept up an ineffective fire on the town, Moore noting that the placement of the guns on the heights was too far to achieve an effective bombardment of the defensive positions. Both sides suffered casualties during the exchange of battery fire, one of whom was Nelson, who was wounded in the back during a skirmish on a ridge overlooking the town on 13 April. By 21 April, British naval batteries had been established 1,000 yards (910 m) from Bastia, and on 25 April Hood ordered D'Aubant to bring his troops at San Fiorenzo over the mountains and seize the Cardo ridge, with Hood calculating that Lacombe-Saint-Michel would be intimidated into surrender. However, D'Aubant refused on the grounds that such an operation would be pointless without the delayed reinforcements from Gibraltar. His order rebuffed, Hood resigned his forces to stalemate until he could starve the French garrison out of the town.

== Surrender ==
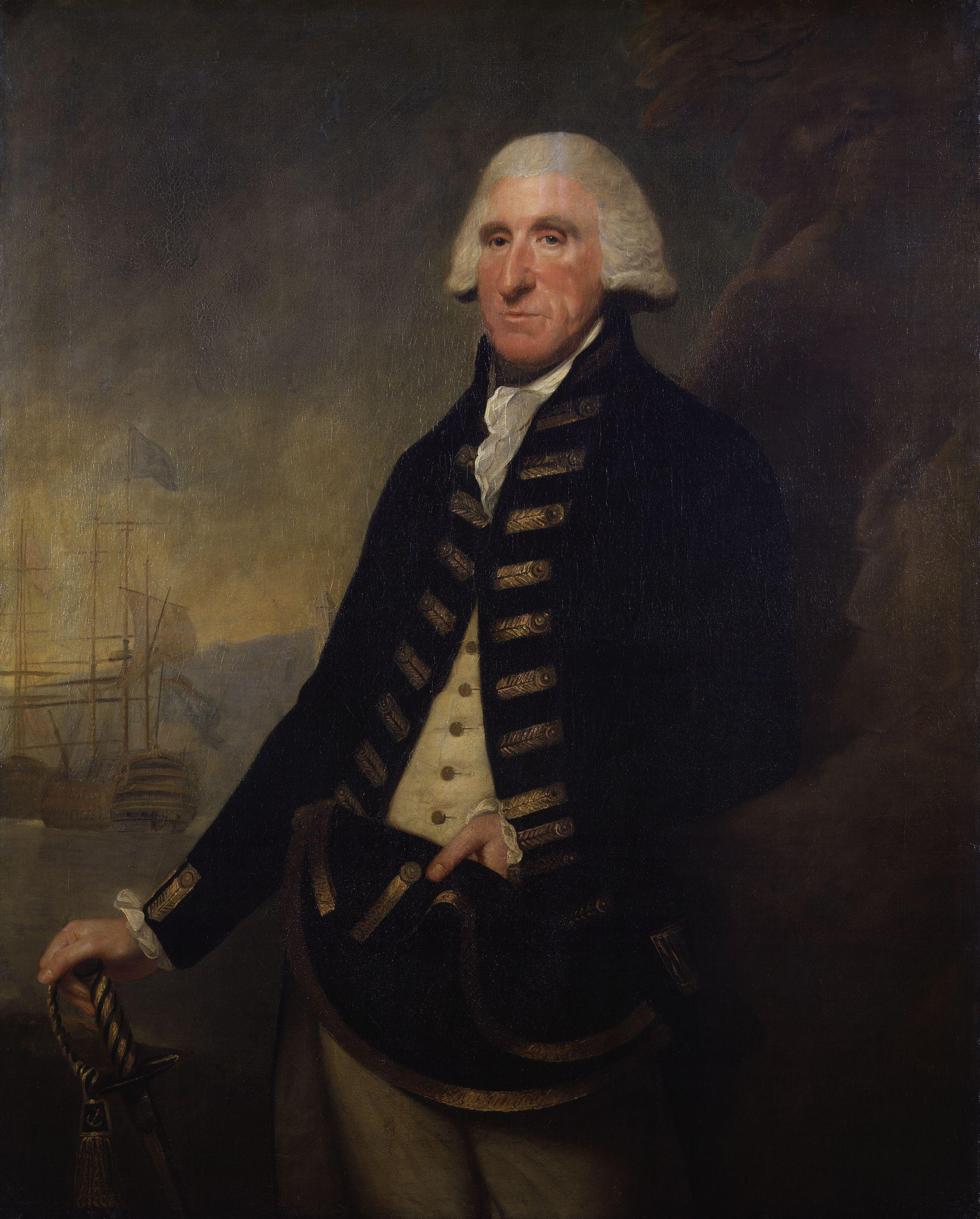
1795 portrait of Hood by Lemuel Francis Abbott

On 12 May, Lacombe-Saint-Michel slipped out of Bastia on a small vessel. His stated purpose was to assemble reinforcements, but it was clear at this stage that Bastia would fall and he sought to inform the National Convention of the situation on the island. He left command to his deputy Antoine Gentili. Three days later the expected British reinforcements finally landed at San Fiorenzo, and D'Aubant wrote to Hood suggesting a joint assault on the town. Aware of the impending surrender of Bastia, Hood refused and D'Aubant furiously resigned his command, although he was embarrassingly forced to remain in Corsica as Hood deliberately neglected to provide him with a vessel for passage to Leghorn.

Bastia's food reserves ran dry on 21 May, and Gentili finally sailed from the harbour on 22 May, sending envoys aboard Hood's flagship HMS Victory to sign the terms. The conditions were generous: the French troops were to be repatriated to France along with those Corsican who wished to leave. All Corsicans who had joined the French were granted an amnesty and their property was to be respected. Paoli and his Corsicans were furious; Paoli's deputy Carlo Andrea Pozzo di Borgo attempted to intervene and was rebuffed by Hood, and Moore suggested that Hood had granted these terms to embarrass the army, whom the admiral publicly blamed for the length and failures of the siege. Historian Desmond Gregory has suggested instead however that Hood needed the siege concluded primarily so that his fleet to return to urgent operations elsewhere in the Mediterranean.

Nelson was the first British commander to enter the town, later proclaiming that the siege had proved "that one Englishman was the equal of three Frenchmen". D'Aubant, who had still not departed from Corsica, arrived soon afterwards. The hospitals of Bastia were filled with sick French soldiers, and French casualties during the siege were reported as more than 700, in comparison with British Army losses of 7 killed, 6 missing and 21 wounded and Navy losses of 7 killed, 13 wounded. In the town 80 cannon were seized, and the small corvette Fleche captured and taken into the Royal Navy under the same name. Villettes was subsequently appointed military governor of the town, remaining in post until the evacuation in 1796.

== Aftermath ==
With San Fiorenzo and Bastia now firmly in British hands, Calvi remained the last French stronghold on the island. British forces landed in June and laid siege to the town over two months, operations hampered by rampant sickness in the British camp and Hood refusing to provide the new army commander, Charles Stuart with adequate men and artillery necessary to break the defences under the command of French-supporting Corsican Casabianca. As at the earlier sieges, Hood and Stuart squabbled and blamed one another for failures in the operation, and Corsica was not brought under total British control until August. The report of the siege written by Lord Hood and published in the London Gazette was later privately criticised by Nelson, who felt that he was not given sufficient credit for his part in the operation; in particular he was angry at the praise for Captain Anthony Hunt, a relatively junior officer who had played little part in the siege but whom was a personal friend of Hood. Despite this frustration, the victories on Corsica have been characterised as the moment at which Nelson first rose to prominence in the British naval establishment.

The victory at Bastia did however provide Paoli with sufficient evidence to persuade his fellow Corsicans to accept his agreement with Hood that Corsica would become a self-governing part of the British Empire. Elections to a national parliament were held in Corsica on 1 June and on 16 June a constitution was announced, negotiated by Paoli and new British viceroy Sir Gilbert Elliot. The constitution offered wide male suffrage, biennial elections and strong executive powers firmly held by Paoli through Pozzo di Borgo as nominal president. Within a few weeks however Paoli and Elliott had fallen out over policy disagreements, and the relationship remained tense until the British departed two years later.

== Bibliography ==
- Bennett, Geoffrey (2002) [1972]. Nelson the Commander. London: Penguin. ISBN 0-141391-29-4.
- Clowes, William Laird (1997) [1900]. The Royal Navy, A History from the Earliest Times to 1900, Volume III. London: Chatham Publishing. ISBN 1-86176-012-4.
- Gardiner, Robert, ed. (2001) [1996]. Fleet Battle and Blockade. London: Caxton Editions. ISBN 1-84067-363-X.
- Gregory, Desmond (1985). The Ungovernable Rock: A History of the Anglo-Corsican Kingdom and its role in Britain's Mediterranean Strategy During the Revolutionary War (1793–1797). London & Toronto: Associated University Presses. ISBN 9780838632253.
- Ireland, Bernard (2005). The Fall of Toulon: The Last Opportunity the Defeat the French Revolution. Cassell. ISBN 0-3043-6726-5.
- James, William (2002) [1827]. The Naval History of Great Britain, Volume 1, 1793–1796. London: Conway Maritime Press. ISBN 0-85177-905-0.
- Mostert, Noel (2007). The Line upon a Wind: The Greatest War Fought at Sea Under Sail 1793 – 1815. Vintage Books. ISBN 9-78071-260-9272.
- Sugden, John (2005). Nelson: A Dream of Glory. Pimlico.
