= Peter Adam Thrasher =

British biographer, and writer

Peter Adam Thrasher (1923 – 9 February 2018) was a British biographer and writer on population statistics.

Thrasher was born in Plymouth, Devon and educated at Mutley College in Plymouth. From 1939 until 1957 he worked for the Admiralty and during 1957–1964 he was employed by the London County Council. During 1964–1966 he worked for the Department of the Environment. In 1966 he was appointed to the Greater London Council as a chartered civil engineer at the department of planning and transportation.

His biography of the Corsican nationalist politician Pasquale Paoli was published in 1970. David Abram in The Rough Guide to Corsica called Thrasher's work the "best English-language biography of the great man" and that as an introduction to Paoli "it's hard to beat". His PhD thesis was titled "The diplomatic career of Pozzo di Borgo: envoy extraordinary of the Court of Russia and Russian Ambassador at Paris 1805–1835, Russian Ambassador at London 1835–1840" and was printed by Birkbeck, University of London in 1974.

Trasher died in Poole on 9 February 2018, at the age of 94.

== Works ==
- Pasquale Paoli: An Enlightened Hero, 1725–1807 (London: Constable, 1970).
- Standard Statistical Sectors for Greater London, co-authored with Keith Crawford (London: Greater London Council, 1971).
