= French frigate Proselyte (1786) =

History

France
- Name: Proselyte
- Laid down: February 1785
- Launched: February 1786
- Fate: Handed over to the Royal Navy in August 1793

Great Britain
- Name: HMS Proselyte
- Acquired: August 1793 by capture
- Fate: Burnt and scuttled on 11 April 1794

General characteristics
- Displacement: Unladen: 672 tons; Laden: 1,100 tons
- Tons burthen: c.700 (bm)
- Length: 138 ft 0 in (42.1 m)
- Beam: 36 ft 0 in (11.0 m)
- Depth of hold: 15 ft 0 in (4.6 m)
- Complement: French Navy; Peacetime:188; Wartime:270; Royal Navy:120
- Armament: French Navy: Upper deck: 26 × 12-pounder guns; QD & Fc: 6 × 9-pounder guns; Royal Navy: 24 cannons

French frigate Proselyte was a one-off built to a design by Charles-Louis Ducrest, and launched in 1786 at Le Havre. French Royalists handed her over to the British Royal Navy when it occupied Toulon in 1793. The Royal Navy commissioned her as a floating battery. She was lost in action at the siege of Bastia in April 1794.

== French Navy ==
Proselyte, under the command of capitaine de vasseau La Galisonnière sailed from Brest on 12 June 1786 to Havre. Then on 25 June she sailed on to Cherbourg with the training squadron.

In 1788 to 1789, Proselyte was in the East Indies.

On 4 October 1792, Proselyte was commissioned at Brest. From 27 November 1792 to 14 January 1793 se sailed from Brest to Toulon.

Between 20 and 21 April 1793, Proselyte, capitaine de vaisseau Boubennec, helped defend Calvi from the partisans under the leadership of the Corsican patriot Pasquale Paoli.

Between 7 and 14 June 1793, Proselyte sailed from Calvi to Villefranche. On board was an artillery officer, Lieutenant-Colonel Napoleon Bonaparte.

== Royal Navy ==
The British captured Toulon on 29 August 1793 when she was one of a number of vessels that French Royalists handed over to the Royal Navy. The Royal Navy commissioned her as a floating battery under the command of Lieutenant Joseph Bullen. When the British finally evacuated Toulon on 18 December, Proselyte was the last vessel to leave the harbour. Bullen had volunteered to evacuate 300 Spanish and Neapolitan troops, who had been deserted by their countrymen.

Lieutenant Walter Serocold was promoted to commander on 13 December into Proselyte, after she had left Toulon, possibly as she was re-armed at Portoferraio. He superseded Bullen, who continued to serve on Proselyte as a volunteer and was aboard when she was lost.

== Fate ==
Proselyte was bombarding Bastia on 1 April 1794 when heated shot from French shore batteries set her on fire and she was destroyed. Help from the rest of the fleet rescued Proselyte's crew. Serocold was setting up a battery at the siege of Calvi on 8 July 1804 when a grapeshot killed him.
