= Torra di Fornali =

Genoese coastal defence tower in Corsica

Coordinates: 42°41′14″N 9°16′42″E

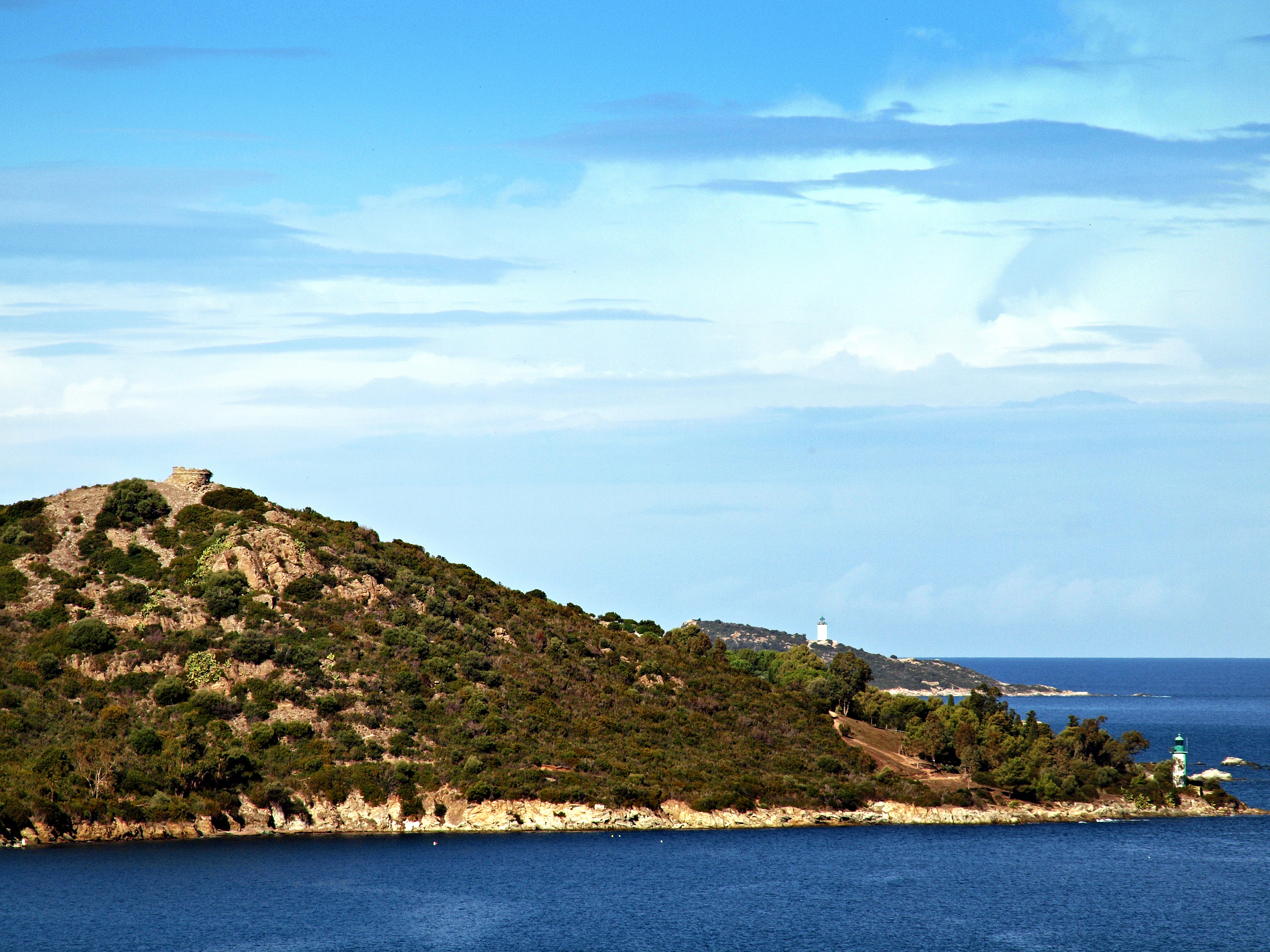
- Interactive map of Torra di Fornali

The Torra di Fornali is a Genoese tower in Corsica, located in the commune of Saint-Florent.

The tower was fought over during the Siege of Saint-Florent in 1794.
