= Campaigns of 1795 of the French Revolutionary Wars =

Aspect of French history

The French Revolutionary Wars continued from 1794 between Revolutionary France and the First coalition.

The year opened with French forces in the process of attacking the Dutch Republic in the middle of winter. The Dutch people rallied to the French call and started the Batavian Revolution. City after city was occupied by the French. The Dutch fleet was captured, and the stadtholder William V fled to be replaced by a popular Batavian Republic, which supported the revolutionary cause and signed the Treaty of The Hague on 16 May 1795, ceding the territories of North Brabant and Maastricht to France.

With the Netherlands falling, Prussia also decided to leave the coalition, signing the Peace of Basel on 6 April, ceding the west bank of the Rhine to France. This freed Prussia to finish the occupation of Poland.

The French army in Spain advanced, advancing in Catalonia while taking Bilbao and Vitoria and marching toward Castile. By 10 July, Spain also decided to make peace, recognizing the revolutionary government and ceding the territory of Santo Domingo, but returning to the pre-war borders in Europe. This left the armies on the Pyrenees free to march east and reinforce the armies on the Alps, and the combined army overran Piedmont.

Meanwhile, Britain's attempt to reinforce the rebels in the Vendée by landing troops at Quiberon failed, and a conspiracy to overthrow the republican government from within ended when Napoleon Bonaparte's garrison used cannon to fire grapeshot into the attacking mob (which led to the establishment of the Directory).

On the Rhine frontier, General Pichegru, negotiating with the exiled Royalists, betrayed his army and forced the evacuation of Mannheim and the failure of the siege of Mainz by Jourdan. This was a moderate setback to the position of the French.

In northern Italy victory at the Battle of Loano in November gave France access to the Italian peninsula.

== See also ==
- War in the Vendée

Preceded by 1794	French Revolutionary Wars; 1795	Succeeded by 1796
