= Siege of Calvi =

Siege of the War of the First Coalition

Coordinates: 42°33′37″N 8°45′05″E

- Part of the invasion of Corsica
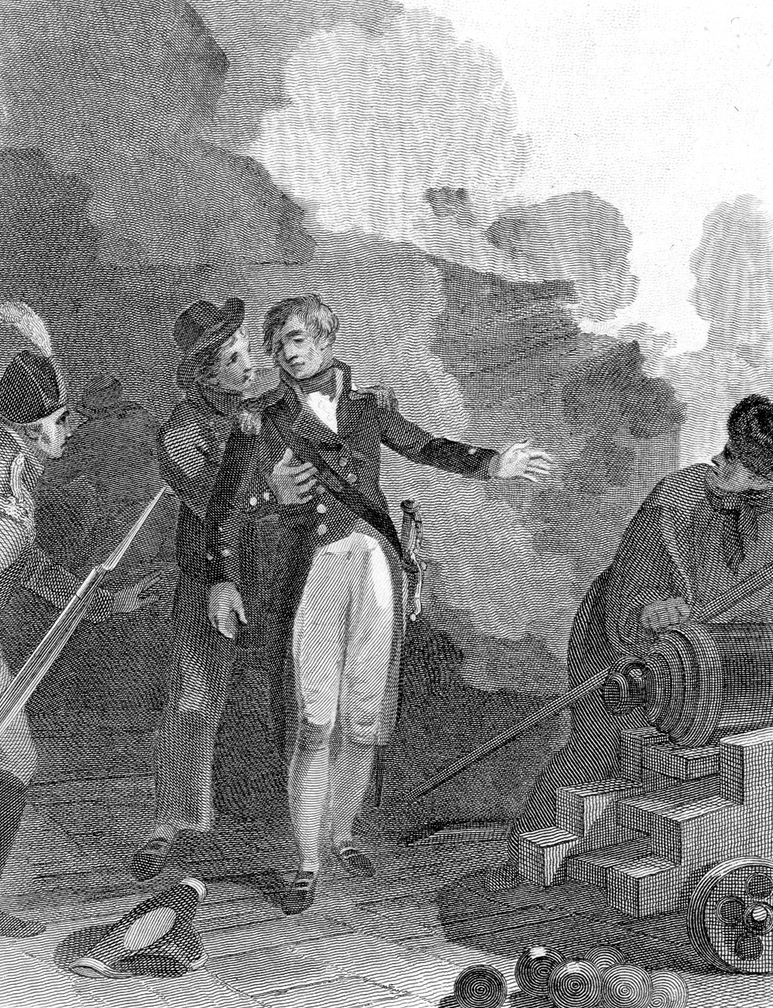
- Nelson losing his eye during the siege
Date	17 June − 10 August 1794
Location	Calvi, Corsica
Result	Anglo-Corsican victory

Belligerents
Great Britain; Corsica	France

Commanders and leaders
Samuel Hood (Kingdom of Great Britain) Horatio Nelson (WIA); Charles Stuart; John Moore; Pasquale Paoli	Raphaël Casabianca

Strength
2,300; Mediterranean Fleet	6,000 total regulars and militia on the island 2 frigates 2 brigs 1 gunboat

Casualties and losses
38 killed 50 wounded 1,000 sick	700 killed or wounded 2 frigates captured 2 brigs captured 1 gunboat captured

The siege of Calvi was a combined British and Corsican military operation during the Invasion of Corsica in the early stages of the French Revolutionary Wars. The Corsican people had risen up against the French garrison of the island in 1793, and sought support from the British Royal Navy's Mediterranean Fleet under Lord Hood. Hood's fleet was delayed by the Siege of Toulon, but in February 1794 supplied a small expeditionary force which defeated the French garrison of San Fiorenzo and then a larger force which besieged the town of Bastia. The British force, now led by General Charles Stuart, then turned their attention to the fortress of Calvi, the only remaining French-held fortress in Corsica.

Calvi was a heavily fortified position, defended by two large modern artillery forts. Stuart therefore prepared for a long siege, seizing the mountainous heights over the approaches to the town and opening a steady fire, which was vigorously returned. Both sides took casualties; among the British wounded was Captain Horatio Nelson, who was blinded in one eye. After several weeks the French positions were sufficiently damaged and Stuart launched a major assault, driving the French out of the forts in turn and into the town. Stuart and the French commander Raphaël de Casabianca then engaged in extended negotiations which led to first a truce and then, on 10 August, a capitulation. The terms of the surrender were generous, and the French troops repatriated to France. With the conclusion of the siege the island of Corsica now became a British colony, and remained a British base of operations for two years.

== Background ==
The French Revolution of 1789 encouraged the rise of nationalist sentiment in Corsica, a French-held island in the northwestern Mediterranean Sea. The French had invaded and captured the island in 1768, but in the aftermath of the Revolution the Corsican leader-in-exile Pasquale Paoli returned home and rapidly consolidated his power, driving out his opponents, including the powerful Bonaparte family, and taking control of Corsica. In 1793 however the National Convention, alarmed by the increasing autonomy of Corsica and in the grip of the Reign of Terror, ordered Paoli's arrest. Determined to resist, Paoli raised an irregular army and drove the French garrison into three fortified ports on the northern coast. He simultaneously sent envoys to the British ambassadors in Italy requesting assistance. Britain had recently joined the French Revolutionary Wars, and a large British fleet had arrived in the Mediterranean in the summer of 1793 under the command of Admiral Lord Hood.

Hood was unable to immediately supply reinforcements to Paoli due to an unexpected Royalist uprising in Toulon, the principal French naval base in the Mediterranean. The ensuing Siege of Toulon consumed most of Hood's attention and resources for several months, although a small squadron was sent to the port of San Fiorenzo in October, but was driven off with heavy casualties. In December Toulon fell to a French army, and Hood was forced to make a desperate retreat from the port. In the process half of the French Mediterranean fleet anchored in the harbour, was burned and Hood removed 7,000 Royalist refugees. Bereft of a base in the Ligurian Sea, Hood turned his attention to Corsica.

A deal was negotiated by which in exchange for British military support against the French-held towns of San Fiorenzo, Bastia and Calvi, Corsica would become a self-governing part of the British Empire, providing Hood with a base of operations against the French coast. The French garrison on the island, comprising some 6,000 French troops and Corsican militia was led by the pro-revolutionary Corsican Raphaël de Casabianca, based in Calvi. In February a British expeditionary force landed near San Fiorenzo, laid siege to the town and captured it in a short campaign. In April, the much larger town of Bastia was besieged and starved into surrender by May, with the surviving French garrison repatriated to France. Only Calvi remained. These campaigns were marked on the British part by internecine squabbles between the British commanders, with a succession of generals resigning rather than continue to work with the overbearing Lord Hood. The most recent replacement was Charles Stuart, whose naval counterpart was Captain Horatio Nelson, as Hood had sailed to Gourjean Bay in pursuit of a French fleet.

== Landings at Port-Agra ==
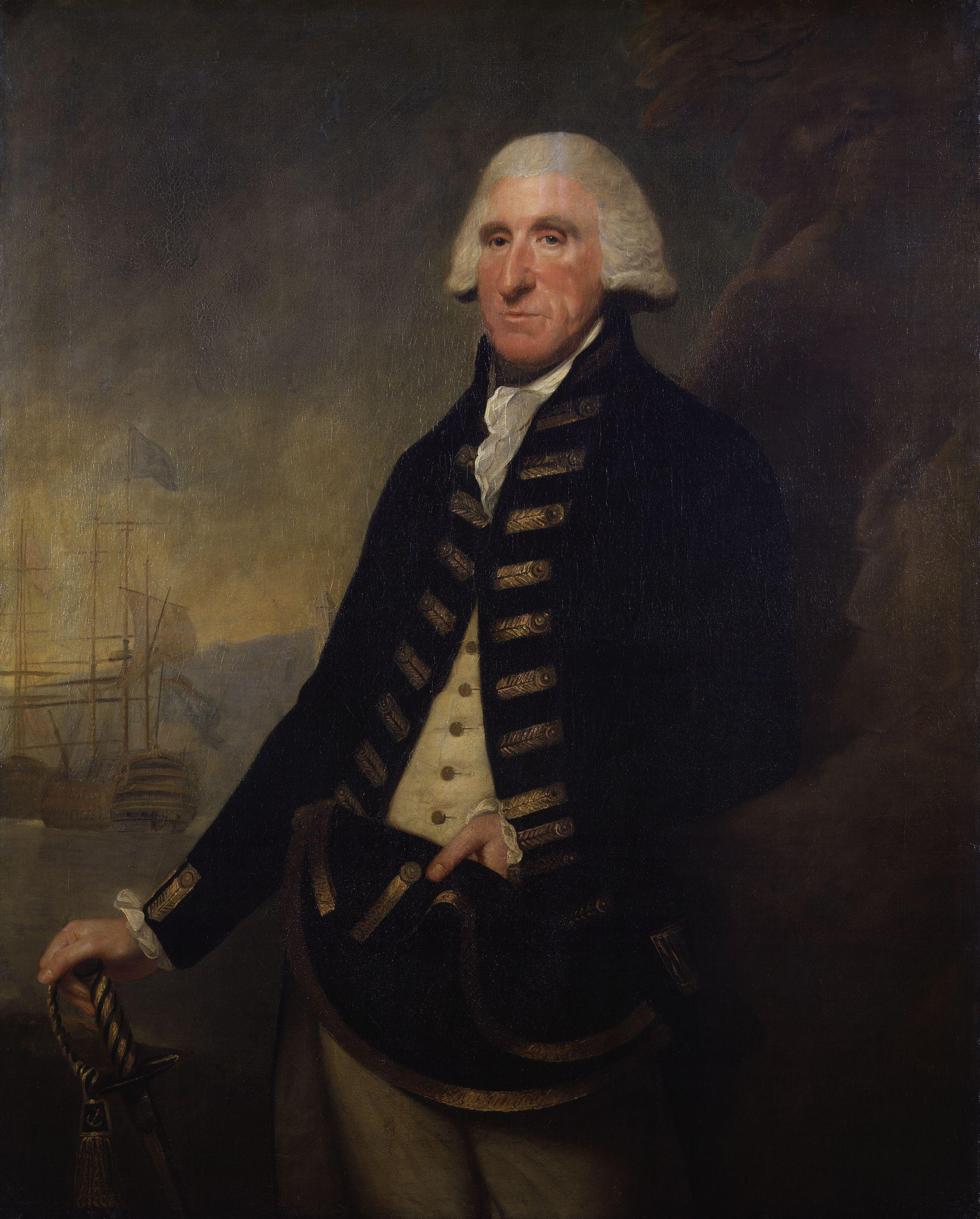
1795 portrait of Hood by Lemuel Francis Abbott

Calvi was heavily defended, the approaches to the port protected from attack by two modern forts. On the west side of the town was Fort Mozello, a star fort mounting ten cannon and supported by a smaller battery to the east. To the southwest of the town was a second fortification, Fort Mollinochesco, which dominated the main road through the mountains from the Corsican interior. In the Bay of Calvi the French frigates Melpomène of 40 guns and Mignonne of 28 guns were anchored in a position to provide enfilading fire on any attacking force. The British commanders knew that if they delayed an assault into the summer of 1794 that their troops would suffer in the "unhealthy season" when malaria was rife on the island and their conquest might be significantly delayed. Stuart and Hood thus resolved to attack as soon as practicable.

Stuart landed his forces at the cove of Port-Agra, 3 miles (4.8 km) from Calvi, escorted by a squadron led by Nelson in the ship of the line HMS Agamemnon and the store frigates HMS Dolphin and HMS Lutine, accompanied by 16 transports. Stuart's plan was, as at Bastia, that the British forces would haul artillery up the steep slopes of the mountains which overlooked the town and fire on the forts below with relative impunity. This was a highly complex operation which required roads to be built to access the mountainsides; Nelson estimated that one 26-pounder cannon had had to be hauled over 80 miles (130 km) of mountainous terrain simply to reach its intended position. Unloading the supplies at Port-Agra took two days, and on the latter reinforcements arrived, Hood sending a detachment of sailors from his flagship HMS Victory with additional stores under the command of captains Benjamin Hallowell and Walter Serocold.

During this process Nelson and the squadron had to retreat off-shore for five days to allow a gale to pass, but Hood appeared off Port-Agra on 27 June in Victory, and landed additional cannon. The British admiral had been distracted by a short French naval campaign which had left the French fleet blockaded in Gourjean Bay near Fréjus. The British batteries were not all in place until 4 July, with each fort facing a mortar battery, each supported by two cannon batteries. These were emplaced overnight, so that the French were reportedly unaware of their presence until the barrage commenced; one battery was only 750 yards (690 m) from Fort Mozello.

== Bombardment of Calvi ==
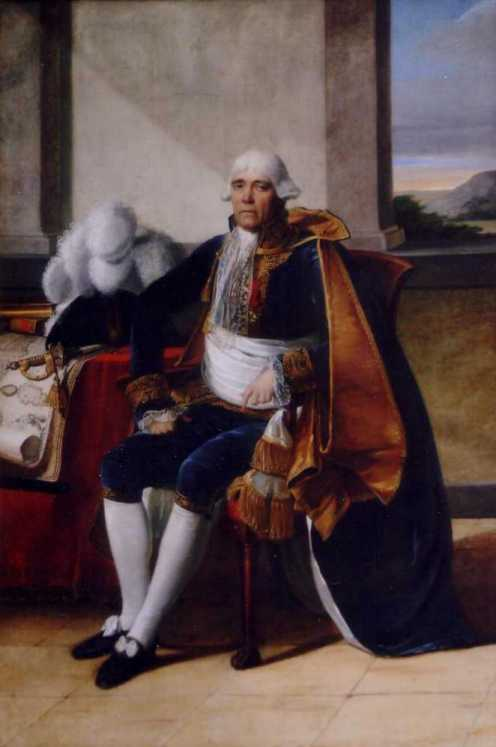
Portrait of Casabianca made 13 years after the siege

The first fire was opened two days earlier than planned, against Fort Mollinochesco. So heavy was the British bombardment that by 6 July the fort had been badly damaged. During that evening French work parties sought to repair some of the damage, but were dissuaded by feint attacks on the fort by detachments of Corsican irregulars and troops from the 18th Regiment of Foot. These operations forced French forward picquets to withdraw, allowing a new British battery to be erected close to the damaged fort. This battery rendered the fort indefensible and the French garrison withdrew into Calvi. With Fort Mollinochesco in British hands the bay was no longer a safe anchorage for the French, and the frigates retired into Calvi harbour.

British efforts then focused on Fort Mozello, subjecting the fort to a heavy fire for a further twelve days, at which point a breach had been blown in the western wall of the badly damaged fort. During this period French counter-battery fire proved effective and dangerous; Serocold was killed by cannon fire while manning a battery, and Nelson severely injured by flying stone splinters on 12 July, eventually losing the sight in his right eye. With Mozello weakened, Stuart gave orders for an assault on the outer works of the fort on 18 July; batteries were thrown up overnight by the 50th Regiment of Foot to provide cover for a general attack at daylight by elements of the 7th Regiment of Foot under Lieutenant-colonel John Moore and the 18th Foot under Lieutenant-colonel David Douglas Wemyss. Despite heavy musket fire and hand to hand fighting with French pikemen the British regiments captured the outer batteries, stormed the breach and took possession of the fort.

With the main French defences in British hands, the town came under heavy close bombardment, shattering houses and causing heavy casualties among the garrison and townspeople; only 12 cannon were still in operation by the time Stuart sent terms of surrender to Casabianca on 19 July. The French commander responded however with the town's Latin motto "Civtas Calvis semper fidelis" ("Calvi is always loyal"). Stuart responded by siting new batteries 650 yards (590 m) from the city walls, but did not initially resume the bombardment. On July Casabiana sent a message to Stuart notifying the British general that if supplies and reinforcements had not arrived within 25 days he would surrender the city. Stuart conferred with Hood on Victory, the admiral having returned from his blockade, leaving his fleet under the command of Admiral William Hotham.

Hood and Stuart agreed that they would not permit Calvi to hold beyond 10 August, but on the evening of 28 July four small vessels carrying supplies slipped through the meagre British blockade, to cheers from the defenders. The offer of surrender was withdrawn, and firing resumed once more on both sides at 17:00, but these ships brought no ammunition, for which Calvi was desperately short, and on 31 July a new offer of a truce was made and accepted by Stuart, to last six days. On 10 August, after 51 days of siege, Casabianca capitulated as arranged, his men marching from the town and laying their arms down before the commander signed terms with Stuart that guaranteed his repatriation to France with his surviving garrison.

== Aftermath ==
British battle casualties were 30 killed and 58 wounded, but the end of the siege was an urgent necessity for Stuart as the summer heat was severely affecting his troops, which were severely reduced in number by malaria and dysentery which had swept though the camp so virulently that just 400 men were still fit for duty at the surrender of Calvi. This explains the generous terms, by which 300 French soldiers and 247 Corsican supporters were given safe passage back to France. The surrender provoked angry protests from Britain's allies Austria and Sardinia, whose armies were fighting the French in Italy, but these complaints were dismissed by the new viceroy of Corsica Sir Gilbert Elliot, who suggested that they would have less to complain about if they were more effective opponents of the French. Lord Hood also complained about the terms, criticising Stuart in letters to political allies in Britain. He accused the army commander of "great tenderness", due to his refusal to bombard French hospitals during the siege, opining that this unnecessarily prolonged the operation. Historian Desmond Gregory suggests that this was motivated more by his omission from Stuart's dispatches to London, and notes that Hood immediately reembarked the sailors stationed ashore and departed following the surrender, leaving Stuart to handle management of the captured town and stores with his severely reduced forces.

Those stores were extensive, and included 113 cannon, mortars and howitzers of various sizes and grades. Also taken were Melpomene, Mignonne, two small brigs Augeste and Providence and the gun boat Ca Ira. Melpomene, described by Nelson as "the most beautiful frigate I ever saw", was commissioned into the Royal Navy under the same name, but Mignonne was a small warship unfit for service and was laid up at Portoferraio until 1796, when the ship was burned during the British retreat from the Mediterranean.

Corsica was now in British hands, with Elliott appointed viceroy to the government of Paoli. Elections had been held on 1 June and a constitution was announced on 16 June. After the fall of Calvi, Paoli's deputy Carlo Andrea Pozzo di Borgo was appointed president of Corsica, with Stuart as one of his councilors, but within a few weeks of the fall of Calvi Paoli and Elliott had fallen out over the former's ruthless pursuit of Corsicans who had collaborated with the French. Shortly thereafter Elliott and Stuart also fell out over who held military authority on the island, their relationship deteriorating into a bitter personal feud. The situation in Corsica became so bad that, under the influence of French secret agents, it almost led to civil war in early 1796, a situation which continued until the British forces were forced to withdraw from the island at the end of the year.

== Bibliography ==
- Bennett, Geoffrey (2002) [1972]. Nelson the Commander. London: Penguin. ISBN 0-141391-29-4.
- Clowes, William Laird (1997) [1900]. The Royal Navy, A History from the Earliest Times to 1900, Volume III. London: Chatham Publishing. ISBN 1-86176-012-4.
- Gardiner, Robert, ed. (2001) [1996]. Fleet Battle and Blockade. London: Caxton Editions. ISBN 1-84067-363-X.
- Gregory, Desmond (1985). The Ungovernable Rock: A History of the Anglo-Corsican Kingdom and its role in Britain's Mediterranean Strategy During the Revolutionary War (1793–1797). London & Toronto: Associated University Presses. ISBN 978-0-8386-3225-3.
- Ireland, Bernard (2005). The Fall of Toulon: The Last Opportunity the Defeat the French Revolution. Cassell. ISBN 0-3043-6726-5.
- James, William (2002) [1827]. The Naval History of Great Britain, Volume 1, 1793–1796. London: Conway Maritime Press. ISBN 0-85177-905-0.
