= Paoli, Kentucky =

Unincorporated community in Kentucky, United States

- Unincorporated community
- Location within Kentucky Location within the United States
- Coordinates: 36°40′43″N 85°8′17″W
- Country: United States
- State: Kentucky
- List of counties in Kentucky: Clinton County, Kentucky
- Elevation: 965 ft (294 m)
- Time zone: UTC-6 (Central (CST))
  - Summer (DST): UTC-5 (CDT)
- ZIP code: 42602

Paoli is an unincorporated historical community in Clinton County, Kentucky in the United States that served as the first county seat when the county was organized in 1835. The name derives from Corsican patriot, statesman and military leader Pasquale Paoli, who inspired the American Sons of Liberty movement. Many of the town's settlers had come from Paoli, Pennsylvania, which had been the site of a massacre during the Revolutionary War.

Paoli was a contender in 1837 to become the permanent county seat, but lost to Albany, two miles to its north. A post office established at Paoli in 1833 was also moved to Albany in 1837.

Paoli's location is shown on the USGS's Albany, Kentucky topographical map.
