= Raphaël, Comte de Casabianca =

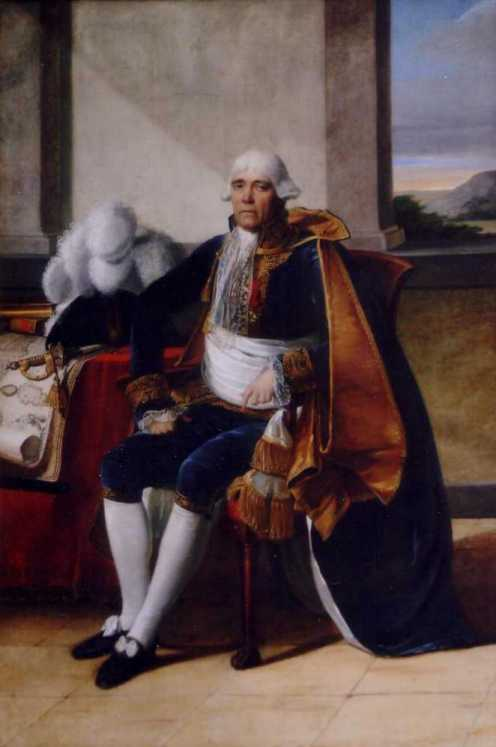
1807 portrait of Casabianca by Marie-Guillemine Benoist

Divisional-General Raphaël, Comte de Casabianca (27 November 1738 – 28 November 1825) was a French Army officer and politician who was descended from a noble Corsican family.

In 1769 he took the side of France against Genoa, then ruler of the island. In 1793, having entered the service of the revolutionary government, he was appointed lieutenant-general in Corsica in the place of Pasquale Paoli.

For his failed defence of Calvi against the British he was promoted to divisional general, and served in Italy from 1794 to 1798. After the Coup of 18 Brumaire he entered the senate and was made count of the empire in 1806.

In 1814 he joined the party of Louis XVIII, rejoined Napoleon during the Hundred Days, and in 1819 succeeded again in entering the chamber of peers. His nephew Louis was a soldier and poet.
