= HMS Scourge (1794) =

History

Great Britain
- Name: HMS Scourge
- Acquired: By purchase (Admiralty Order 3 February 1794)
- Fate: Broken up September 1803

General characteristics
- Type: Hoy
- Tons burthen: 67 (bm)
- Length: 66 ft 2 in (20.2 m) (overall); 58 ft 7 3/8 in (17.9 m) (keel)
- Beam: 14 ft 8 in (4.5 m)
- Depth of hold: 6 ft 7 in (2.0 m)
- Propulsion: Sails
- Sail plan: sloop
- Complement: 30
- Armament: 1 × 24-pounder gun + 3 × 32-pounder carronades

HMS Scourge was a 4-gun gun-vessel, formerly a Dutch hoy, purchased in February 1794. She was fitted out at Deptford between April and 12 May, and commissioned under Lieutenant John Store. His replacement, in August 1795, was Lieutenant John Wolfe, who was succeeded in the next month by Lieutenant Robert Watherston. A little over a year later, in October 1796, Lieutenant Francis M'Ghie took command. In March of the next year Lieutenant Charles Randle replaced him.

== Fate ==
She was paid off in April 1802. The "Scourge Gun-Vessel, 71 Tons, lying at Sheerness", was put up for sale in March 1803. She was renamed Crash on 10 August 1803, but then she was broken up at Sheerness in September.
