= Siege of San Fiorenzo =

1794 siege of the War of the First Coalition

- Part of the invasion of Corsica
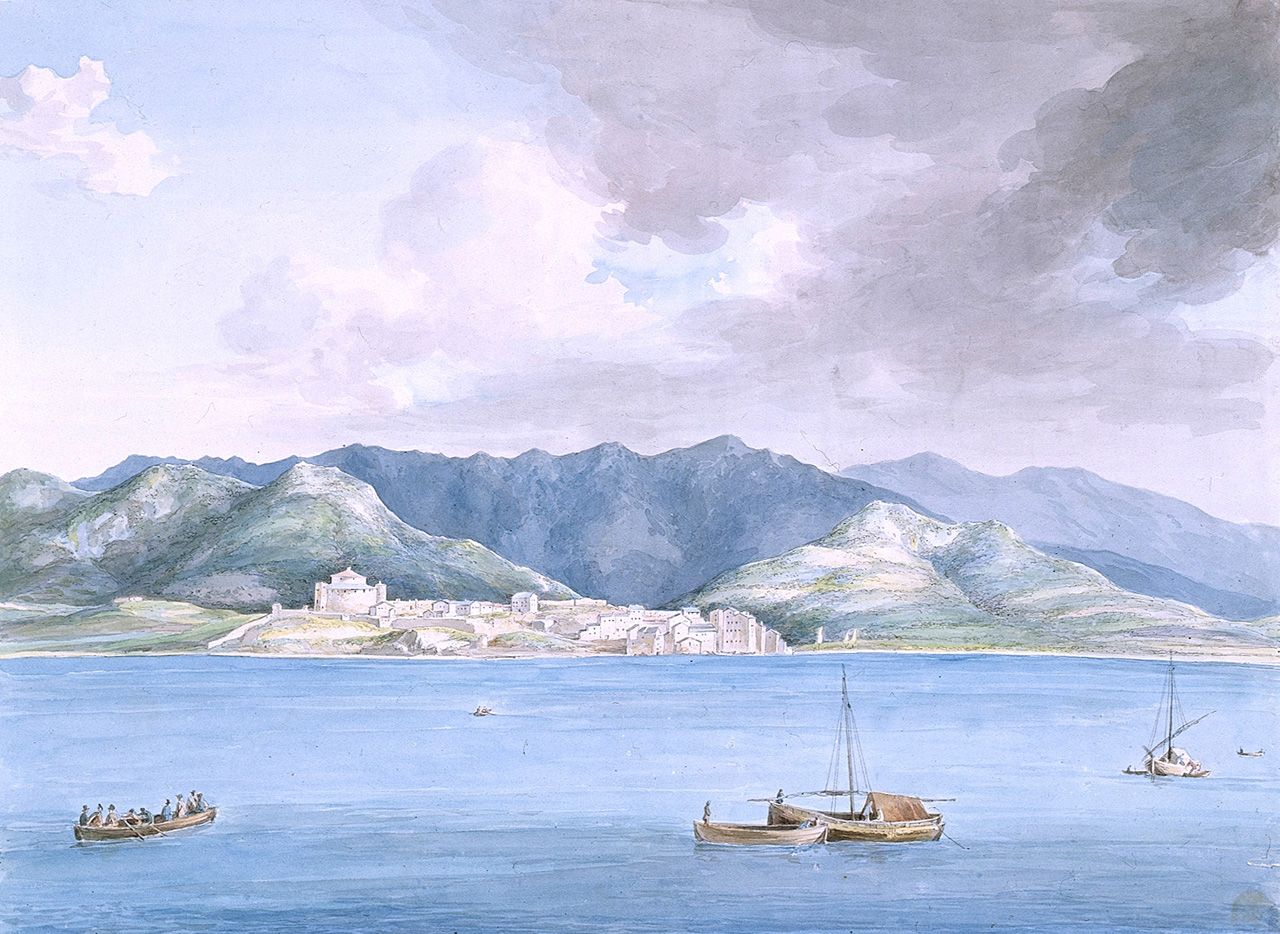
- c. 1795 illustration of San Fiorenzo
Date	7–20 February 1794
Location	San Fiorenzo, Corsica, France 42.6819°N 9.3021°E
Result	Anglo-Corsican victory

Belligerents
Great Britain; Corsica	France

Commanders and leaders
David Dundas; Robert Linzee; Pasquale Paoli	Antoine Gentili

Strength
1,400; Mediterranean Fleet	700; 2 frigates

Casualties and losses
42 killed 127 wounded	102 killed or wounded 101 captured 2 frigates sunk

The siege of San Fiorenzo (also known as the siege of Saint-Florent) was a British and Corsican military operation conducted during the French Revolutionary Wars against the French-held town of San Fiorenzo on the Mediterranean island of Corsica. The Corsican people had risen up against the French Republican garrison in 1793 after an attempt to arrest the Corsican leader Pasquale Paoli during the Reign of Terror. The French had then been driven into three fortified towns on the northern coast; San Fiorenzo, Calvi, and Bastia and Paoli appealed to the British Royal Navy's Mediterranean Fleet, commanded by Lord Hood, for assistance against the French garrison.

In the autumn of 1793 Hood was distracted by the siege of Toulon, but did send a squadron with orders to attack San Fiorenzo. The attack achieved initial success but was driven off by the fortifications at the Torra di Fornali. After the fall of Toulon in December 1793, Hood turned his main attention to Corsica and ordered a joint operation against the town, attacking from the sea and with amphibious landings. Over two weeks the main defences of the town were defeated by a series of artillery operations which drove the French out of their defences one by one and destroyed the French shipping in the harbour. On 18 February the French garrison withdrew across the island to Bastia, which was attacked in turn later in the spring. By August 1794, the French had been driven from Corsica, which had become a self-governing part of the British Empire.

== Background ==
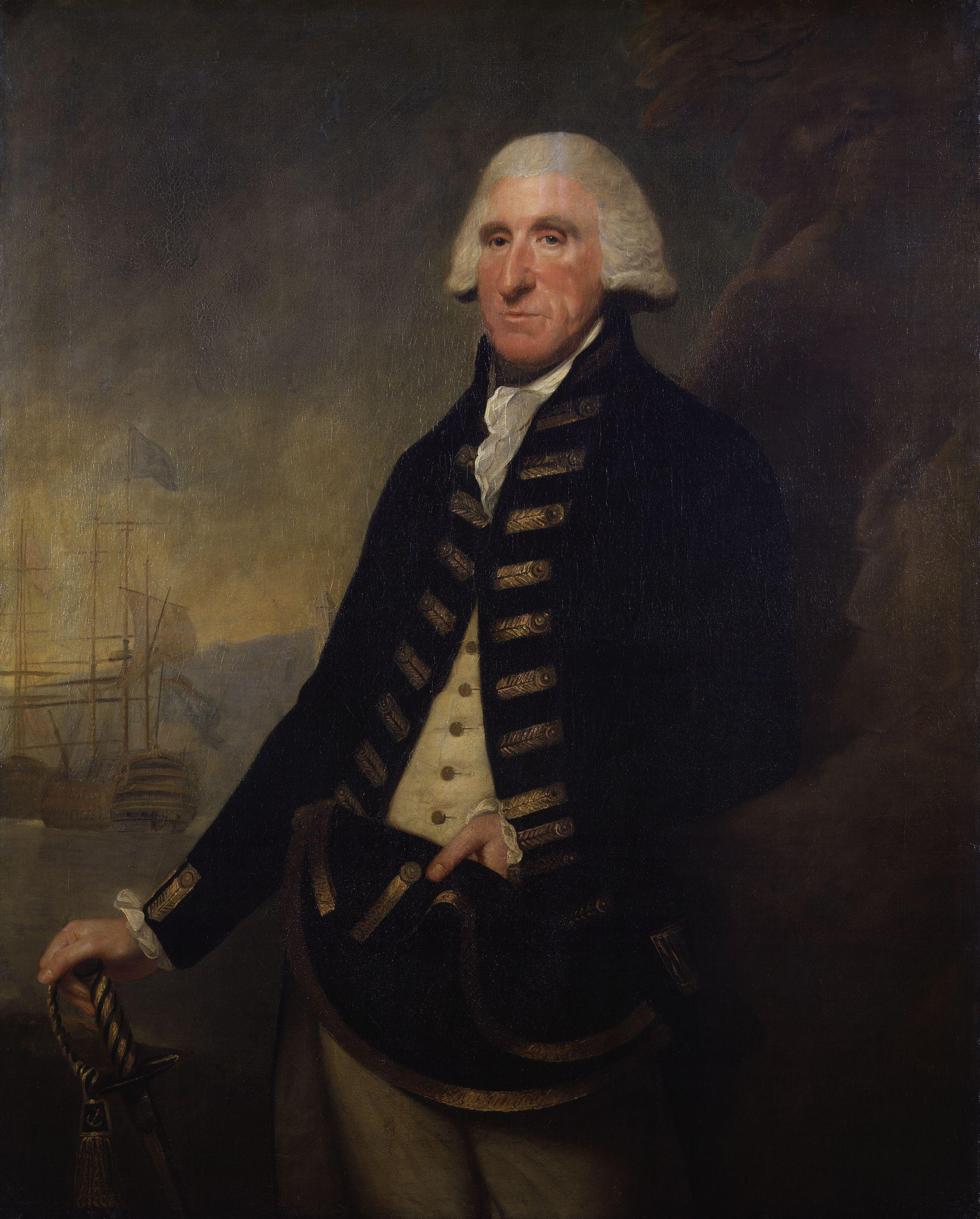
1795 portrait of Lord Hood

Following the French Revolution of 1789, the Corsican leader Pasquale Paoli returned to the island to popular acclaim. Paoli had fled into exile in 1769 after the French invasion and annexation of Corsica, and had been supported in exile by Great Britain. Paoli rapidly defeated his political rivals to become de facto ruler of the island once more, but resisted efforts by the National Convention to exercise control over Corsica and in 1793, as the Reign of Terror swept France, orders were issued for his arrest.

Paoli responded to the threat of arrest by raising a small army of Corsican irregular troops, known principally for their snipers. These forces rapidly made movement around the island by French troops impossible and the French garrison retreated to three fortified port-towns on the northern coast, San Fiorenzo, Calvi, and Bastia. Paoli's irregulars had neither the discipline nor the equipment to attack these positions, which could be resupplied and reinforced by sea, and so Paoli turned to Great Britain for support.

British diplomats in Italy had for some time been advocating British intervention in Corsica, and had sent previous approaches to Paoli which had so far been ignored. By the summer of 1793 however a large British fleet had arrived in the region with orders to blockade the ports of southern France. The particular focus of this operation was the large French fleet base at Toulon, and the British fleet, under Admiral Lord Hood needed a forward base with a sheltered anchorage from which this operation could be organized; Corsica seemed the ideal location. Hood however was immediately distracted by a Royalist uprising in Toulon. Having expelled the Republican leaders of the city the Royalists offered it to Hood, who entered the port, seized the French fleet and occupied the town in August. The Republican forces then laid siege to the city, and Hood had few forces to spare to assist Paoli.

== Linzee's attack ==
In response to Paoli's continuing appeals for support, Hood detached a naval squadron in late September, comprising the ships of the line HMS Alcide, HMS Courageux and HMS Ardent and the frigates HMS Nemesis and HMS Lowestoft under the command of Commodore Robert Linzee. This force was instructed to deliver letters, signed by Hood, to the garrisons of French-occupied towns, proposing terms of surrender comparable to those previously extended at Toulon. In the event that these overtures proved unsuccessful, Linzee was directed to impose a blockade on the ports and, if feasible, to initiate an assault and secure their capture.

The letters were ignored, and Linzee's forces were too few and inadequately equipped to effectively blockade the rocky inlets of the Corsican coast from which smugglers routinely sailed to Italy. Linzee therefore determined to attack San Fiorenzo, on the northwestern coast of Corsica at the southern end of Cap Corse. San Fiorenzo was strategically important for its large sheltered bay, defended by fortifications at Torra di Mortella and Torra di Fornali. On 19 September Linzee sent Nemesis and Lowestoft to attack Torra di Mortella, which was abandoned by its garrison undamaged after three broadsides from Lowestoft. British sailors landed and entered the tower, but returned to their ships the next day. Linzee then waited a week before attacking Torra di Fornali, a much stronger position protected by coastal batteries.

On 1 October at 03:30, Linzee sent Ardent, Alcide and Courageux to bombard Fornali. The ships came under heavy fire not only from the tower and batteries, but also from additional artillery in the town of San Fiorenzo itself, including heated shot. These red hot cannonballs started fires on board the attacking ships, and at 08:15 the squadron retreated out of the bay with all three ships damaged, 19 sailors killed and 35 wounded. The effect on Torra di Fornali was negligible. Linzee claimed that he had been given inaccurate information on the strength of the fortifications by Corsican informants and that he had only ordered the attack on the understanding that it would be supported by an attack from the land by the Corsican irregular forces which never materialised. Hood later accused Paoli of "a composition of art and deceit" in relation to this operation.

The British force withdrew, and in late October a French frigate squadron was sent to San Fiorenzo with reinforcements, escaping an attack by the British ship of the line HMS Agamemnon under Captain Horatio Nelson off Sardinia at the action of 22 October 1793. From this force the French frigates Minerve and Fortunée anchored in the bay under the shelter of the batteries. During this landing the disarmed Torra di Mortella was abandoned by its Corsican garrison and recaptured by the French.

== Invasion of Corsica ==
In Southern France Hood's situation at Toulon became untenable when the French army, led in part by a young Corsican artillery officer named Napoleon Bonaparte, seized the heights overlooking the harbour and began to bombard the British fleet. In the panicked withdrawal that followed half of the French fleet was burned and 7,000 refugees were removed before Republican forces stormed the city and massacred much of the remaining population. Corsica now became a priority for Hood, whose fleet was stationed in the temporary anchorage of the Îles d'Hyères. Paoli was enthused by the defeat at Toulon, recognising his opportunity for support, and negotiated with Hood's envoy Sir Gilbert Elliot to turn Corsica into a self-governing colony of the British Empire if Hood could drive the French from the island.

On 24 January 1794 Hood gave orders for a combined operation against San Fiorenzo, and the fleet sailed from Îles d'Hyères. Driven back by a storm, the fleet sheltered at Portoferraio, and on 4 February an expeditionary force of 1,400 British troops under General David Dundas sailed for the Bay of San Fiorenzo, accompanied by Linzee in Alcide HMS Egmont, HMS Fortitude, Lowestoft and HMS Juno. Dundas' force comprised detachments from the Royal Artificers, Royal Artillery, Royal Fusiliers and the 11th, 25th, 30th, 50th, 51st and 69th Regiments of Foot which had been serving as marines on board the fleet.

Dundas, as senior Army officer in the Mediterranean, had assumed command of the land forces, but he and Hood hated one another, their enmity worsened by the chaotic scenes at the evacuation of Toulon. Cautious and dour, Dundas resented Hood's command, particularly given Hood's lack of understanding of the logistical problems of land warfare. Throughout the campaign Hood wrote letters to London criticising Dundas and undermining his authority. On 7 February the troops disembarked from the transports, landing unopposed on the coast to the west of the Torra di Mortella.

=== Bombardment of Mortella ===
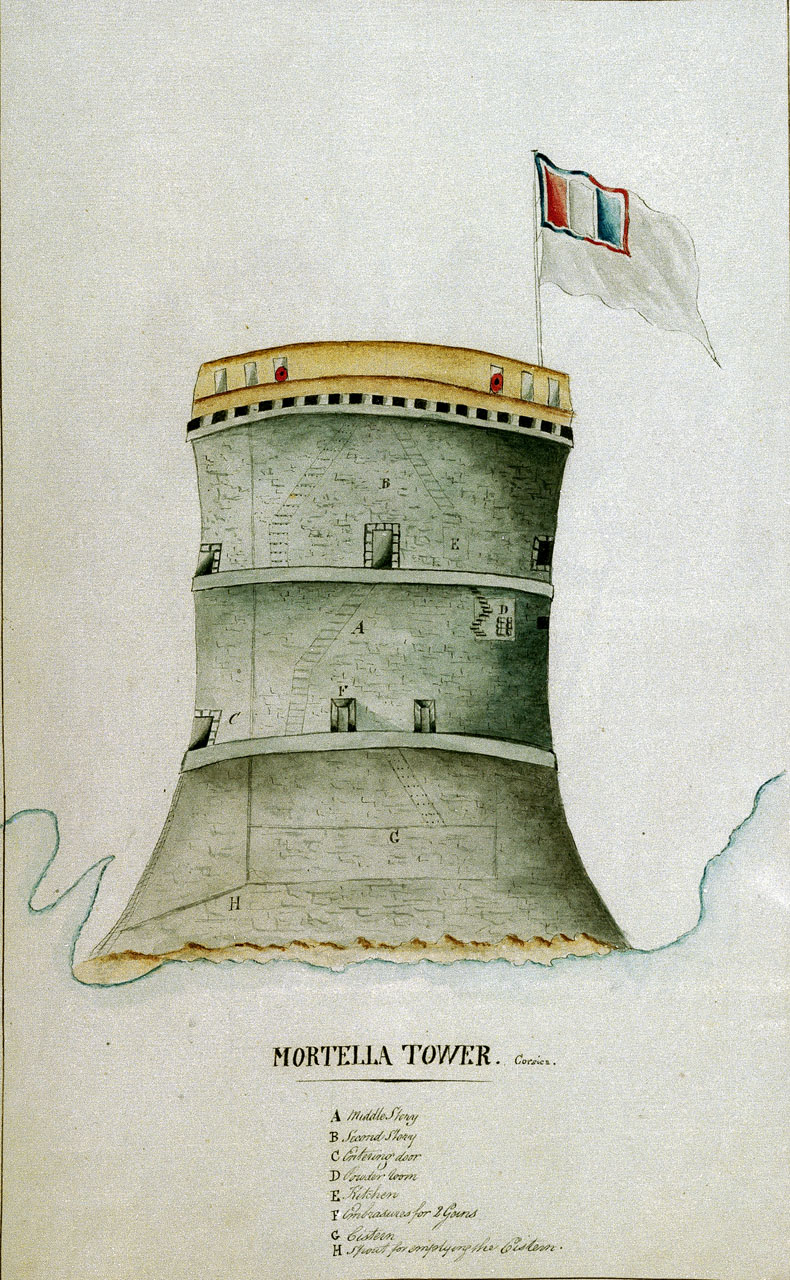
1794 sketch of the Torra di Mortella, probably made by a British Army officer who took part in its capture

On 8 February Linzee ordered Juno and Fortitude under Captain William Young to bombard the Torra di Mortella from the sea while engineers under Lieutenant-Colonel John Moore hauled cannon up the steep hills that overlooked the fortification. The British fire had little impact on the tower, and heated shot from the tower's two 18-pounder long guns ignited an ammunition box on board Fortitude which exploded, killing six sailors and wounding 56. Serious damage was done to the ship's mainmast and rigging and Young was forced to withdraw.

The following day, after resiting his artillery to better effect, Moore was able to open fire on Torra di Mortella from the land. The tower's guns were not well situated to respond, and eventually a shot caused an explosion and fire on the tower's parapet that persuaded the tower's commander, Ensign Thomas le Tellier, to surrender. His garrison of 33 had suffered two killed and the rest were made prisoner. Moore immediately began to move his artillery again, seeking a new position that would overlook a new fortification erected between Mortella and Fornali named the Convention Redoubt.

=== Outflanking the Convention Redoubt ===
Since Linzee's attack on San Fiorenzo in September 1793, the French had reinforced the defences of the town by enclosing an open battery and equipping it with 21 heavy cannon. This position was too strong to attack by sea and too heavily protected to storm directly by land. Moore realised however that there were higher positions disdained by the French as impractical, which overlooked the Redoubt. From 12 February Moore's artillery teams, composed of sailors detached from the squadron, hauled four 18-pounder cannon, a large howitzer and a 10" mortar to a point 700 feet (210 m) above sea level. The only route to this position was a single-track path along a sheer cliff, the guns moved with block and tackle systems across the rocky terrain. By 16 February the guns were in position, and for two days the Convention Redoubt came under sustained fire. An additional gun reached the summit on 17 February and another was emplaced on the shore to prevent the French frigates from bombarding British positions from the sea.

On the evening of 17 February Moore prepared his forces for an assault on the Redoubt, forming three columns. Moore lead the right column, composed of Royals and men of the 51st Regiment, while the centre column was led by men from the 50th Regiment and the left column followed the shoreline, and was made up of men from 25th Regiment. The three columns attacked simultaneously under cover of fire from the new battery on the hill, and despite heavy fire from the French batteries were able to enter the redoubt and drive the French garrison out of the rear entrance and down the hill in hand-to-hand bayonet combat. Corsican irregulars supported the assault with a diversionary attack to the right of Moore's column. In the bombardment and assault approximately 100 French troops were killed or wounded and 70 made prisoners of war. The British force lost 17 men killed and 36 wounded.

The surviving French forces retreated from the Convention Redoubt and across a ravine to the defences around the Torra di Fornali, which had driven off Linzee's squadron in September 1793. A strong position so far undamaged by the bombardment, the British were concerned that it would cause heavy casualties to an attacking force, but the retreating French were panicked and concerned about being cut off, so that during the night the tower and batteries were abandoned, the French soldiers falling back to San Fiorenzo, accompanied by the frigates.

=== French evacuation ===
With the tower in British hands, Linzee's squadron anchored under the guns of Fornali and British batteries began to bombard the town and harbour on 18 February, cannon fire striking Minerve and sinking the frigate in shallow water. The following morning and with the French clearly planning to evacuate the town, Dundas sent in a message offering terms of surrender, but these were refused. In response Corsican forces were sent to the mountain road that linked Bastia and San Fiorenzo to prevent the French from retreating. At 16:00 on 19 February the remaining frigate Fortunée was set on fire and destroyed in the bay. At the same time a boat rowed to the British positions and announced that the town had been abandoned.

== Aftermath ==
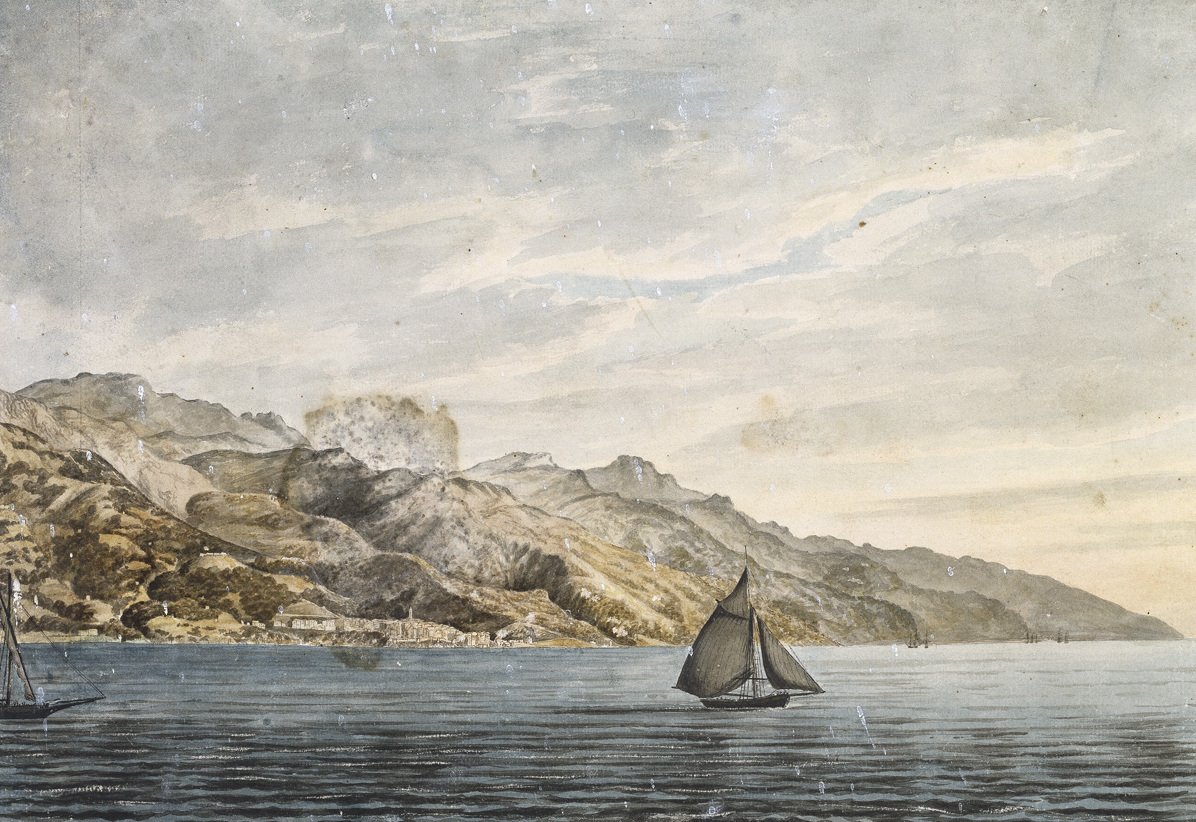
The siege of Bastia, which followed the siege of San Fiorenzo

On 20 February Moore's forces entered and occupied the town, taking 32 cannon. The French were able to withdraw unopposed by the Corsican forces, which were reportedly distracted by looting the bodies of French soldiers killed in the bombardment. The French retired 8 miles (13 km) over the Serra Mountains to Bastia, establishing defensive positions en route at Tichime, a mountain on the road between the towns. Linzee's squadron meanwhile anchored in San Fiorenzo Bay and seized the wreck of Minerve, which was later successfully raised, repaired and joined the Royal Navy under the same name.

The French expected that they would have to conduct a fighting retreat, and preparations were begun to abandon Bastia. Dundas sent Corsican forces to probe the defences, and these troops skirmished with French outposts in the highlands, but he then withdrew them due to the freezing conditions. Captain Horatio Nelson had landed a force of sailors to reconnoitre the town on 19 February, returning an optimistic report on its state of readiness. However, on 23 February the French abandoned their preparations to leave and set about strengthening the town's defences. Dundas then decided not to move on Bastia until reinforcements had arrived from Britain, and withdrew his forces entirely to the outskirts of San Fiorenzo. Hood disagreed with the order, and attempted to undermine Dundas by appealing to his deputies Moore and Lieutenant Colonel William Villettes. This was a breach of the chain of command and Moore informed Dundas. Dundas was furious, and on 11 March he resigned his commission and handed command of land forces to Colonel Abraham D'Aubant.

The siege of Bastia began in earnest in April 1794, with combined blockade and bombardment lasting six weeks before the city surrendered. This left only Calvi as the remaining French-held town in Corsica, which was besieged by a reinforced British and Corsican force in July and surrendered a month later after a massive bombardment. Corsica was annexed to the British Empire as a self-governing kingdom, but was evacuated only two years later following the Treaty of San Ildefonso and the declaration of war on Britain by the Kingdom of Spain.

The siege had an unusual legacy; the Torra di Mortella had gained some notoriety in Britain for its fight against Fortitude, and had been sketched by Royal Engineers after the siege. In 1804, during the early stages of the Napoleonic Wars, there were fears of French efforts to invade Britain, and these sketches were rediscovered and more than a hundred towers ordered to an adapted design to be built along the south and east coasts of Britain. Known as Martello Towers due to a garbled translation, by the time they were completed the invasion threat was over.

== Notes ==
1. The name of the town in Italian is San Fiorenzo (and in Corsican San Fiurenzu). In French it is Saint-Florent. Corsica had been Italian-ruled until 1768 and by 1794 was largely under the control of Corsican forces. British sources (except Gregory) recognise this in consistently referring to the town in historical accounts as San Fiorenzo.

== Bibliography ==
- Bennett, Geoffrey (2002) [1972]. Nelson the Commander. London: Penguin. ISBN 0-141391-29-4.
- Clowes, William Laird (1997) [1900]. The Royal Navy, A History from the Earliest Times to 1900, Volume III. London: Chatham Publishing. ISBN 1-86176-012-4.
- Gardiner, Robert, ed. (2001) [1996]. Fleet Battle and Blockade. London: Caxton Editions. ISBN 1-84067-363-X.
- Gregory, Desmond (1985). The Ungovernable Rock: A History of the Anglo-Corsican Kingdom and its role in Britain's Mediterranean Strategy During the Revolutionary War (1793–1797). London & Toronto: Associated University Presses. ISBN 9780838632253.
- Ireland, Bernard (2005). The Fall of Toulon: The Last Opportunity the Defeat the French Revolution. Cassell. ISBN 0-3043-6726-5.
- James, William (2002) [1827]. The Naval History of Great Britain, Volume 1, 1793–1796. London: Conway Maritime Press. ISBN 0-85177-905-0.
- Mostert, Noel (2007). The Line upon a Wind: The Greatest War Fought at Sea Under Sail 1793 – 1815. Vintage Books. ISBN 9-78071-260-9272.
