= Desmond Gregory =

English historian and army officer

George Desmond Gregory, T.D., M.B.E., (born 10 November 1916 in Hertingfordbury - died 24 June 2010 in Brighton, Sussex) was a wartime British Army staff officer, schoolmaster, and historian of British military operations during the War of the French Revolution and Napoleonic War with a special interest in the Mediterranean islands.

== Early life and education ==
The only son of George Redmayne Gregory, a solicitor, he attended Uppingham School and Balliol College, Oxford, where he studied under the tutelage of Professor Vivian Hunter Galbraith, and Kenneth Norman Bell. He obtained a third in Modern History in 1937. In November 1938, he successfully passed the Law Society Examination. He received his Oxford M.A. (a degree indicating seniority, without requiring postgraduate attendance) in 1942.

== War service ==
Gregory enlisted in the British Army in August 1939 and in January 1940 was commissioned a second lieutenant in the Lancashire Fusiliers. Serving with the Home Forces, he became adjutant, and was promoted to captain and General Staff Officer, grade 3 (GSO 3) serving at General Headquarters, Home Forces. From 1942 to 1944, he served as Brigade-Major in the 169th Brigade, 56th Division. He served in Iraq in 1942; with the 8th Army in Tunisia in 1943 and participated in Operation Avalanche the landing at Salerno, Italy in September 1943. Remaining in Italy until 1944, he attended the British Middle East Staff College at Haifa in Palestine. Promoted to major and GSO 2, he served with the 59th (Staffordshire) Infantry Division shortly after the Normandy landings, and then, with the 53rd Division in Belgium, Holland, and Germany. In 1945 as GSO 2, he was assigned to the 7th Armoured Division in Berlin, and in 1946 to the legal branch of the Military Government in Hamburg, Germany. During his wartime service, he was three times Mentioned in Despatches, and appointed M.B.E. (Military Division) in 1946. The appointment was made on the basis of the following commendation:

"Major Gregory filled the appointment of GSO II in two Infantry Divisions and one Armoured Division during the campaign in the NW Europe. He carried out his duties in the most efficient manner and proved himself a great source of strength to all three staffs. His duties took him continually into the forward areas. He showed, on every occasion, great gallantry and complete coolness under fire, and his splendid example of cheerful indifference to danger was an inspiration to all who saw it. It is not too much to say that this young officer, by his efficiency, personality, and gallantry, contributed much to the outstanding success of the three Divisions in which he served."

On 6 May 1946, Gregory relinquished his commission and was granted the honorary rank of major in the Lancashire Fusiliers.

== Post-war teaching career ==
From May 1946 to 1954, he was a History Master at Bristol Grammar School. Then, in 1954 he moved to Downside School, where he taught until his retirement in 1977. On joining the Downside faculty, his military commission as lieutenant was transferred to the Downside Contingent. In 1964–65, he took a leave of absence from Downside to teach at St. George's English School in Rome. in 1946,

== Post-war military service ==
Shortly after his arrival at Bristol Grammar School, Gregory was appointed lieutenant in the Army's Junior Training Corps' Bristol Grammar School Contingent. In 1947, he was appointed to command the unit. In April 1950, he was promoted to captain, retaining his honorary rank as major in the Lancashire Fusiliers.

In 1960 he received the Territorial Decoration for long service in the Territorial Army. On reaching the age limit for military service on 10 November 1966, he relinquished his commission, retaining the honorary rank of major in the Lancashire Fusiliers.

== Publications ==
Gregory published his first book in 1968, after having taught in Italy for a year in 1964–65. On his retirement from teaching in 1977, Desmond Gregory turned to research and writing historical studies. He initially began with studies of British military operations in the Mediterranean islands, then branched out to biography to follow the careers of two officers who he had encountered in his writing, then wrote on Italy and Latin America.

- Mussolini and the Fascist era (1968)
- The Ungovernable Rock: a history of the Anglo-Corsican kingdom and its role in Britain's Mediterranean strategy during the Revolutionary War (1793-1797) (1985).
- Sicily, The Insecure Base: a history of the British occupation of Sicily, 1806-1815 (1988).
- The Beneficent Usurpers: a history of the British in Madeira (1988).
- Minorca: The Illusory Prize: a history of the British occupations of Minorca between 1708 and 1802 (1990).
- Brute New World: The Rediscovery of Latin America in the Early Nineteenth Century (1992).
- Malta, Britain, and the European powers, 1793-1815 (1996).
- Napoleon's jailer : Lt. Gen. Sir Hudson Lowe: a life (1996).
- No Ordinary General: Lt. General Sir Henry Bunbury: The Best Soldier Historian (1999).
- Napoleon's Italy (2001).
