= Pasquale Paoli =

Corsican statesman (1725–1807)

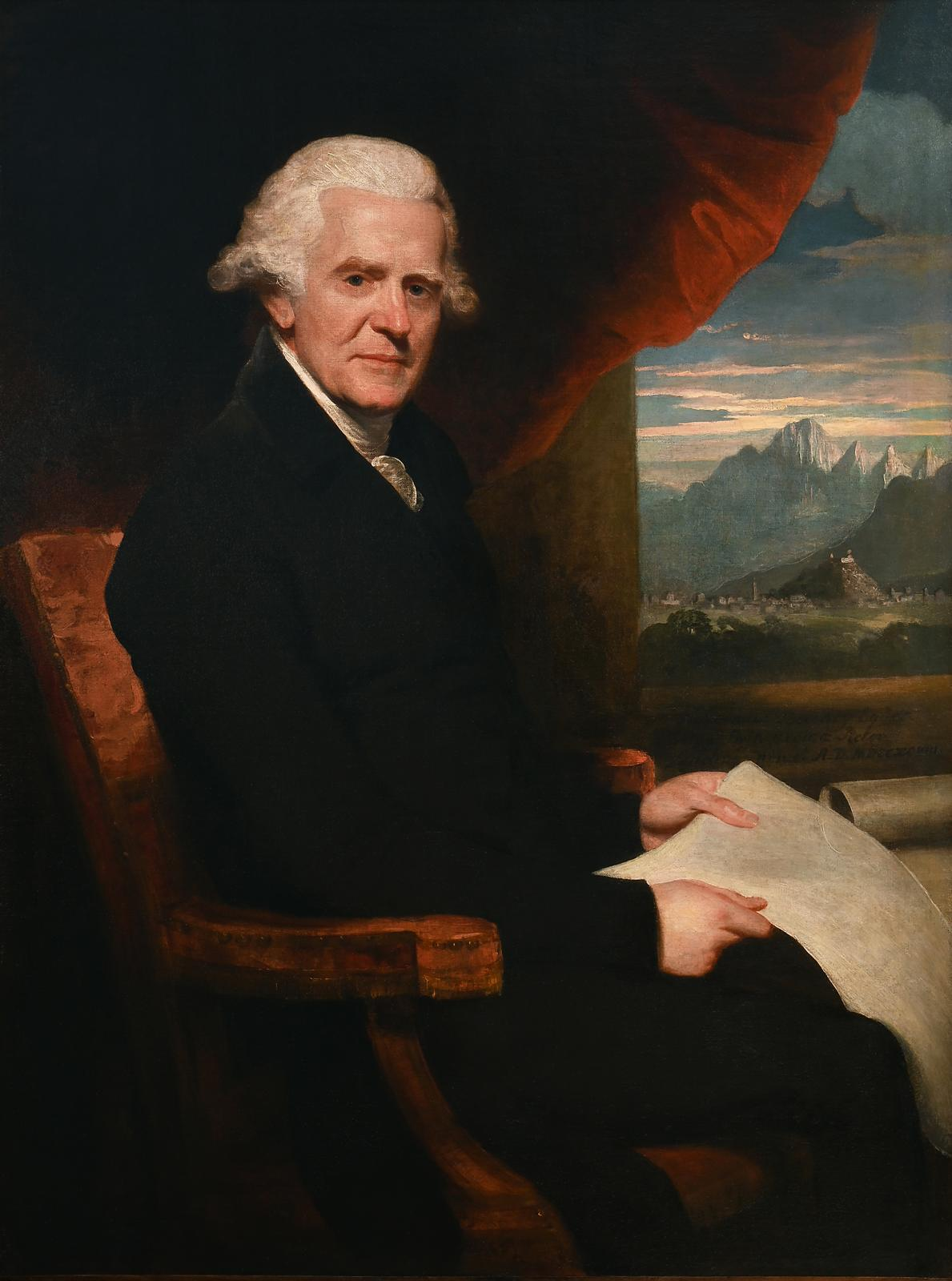
- Portrait by Sir William Beechey, 1798

General of Corsica
- In office 18 November 1755 – 9 May 1769
- Preceded by: Office established
- Succeeded by: Office abolished

Personal details
- Born: 6 April 1725 Morosaglia, Corsica, Republic of Genoa
- Died: 5 February 1807 (aged 81) London, England
- Resting place: Morosaglia, Corsica

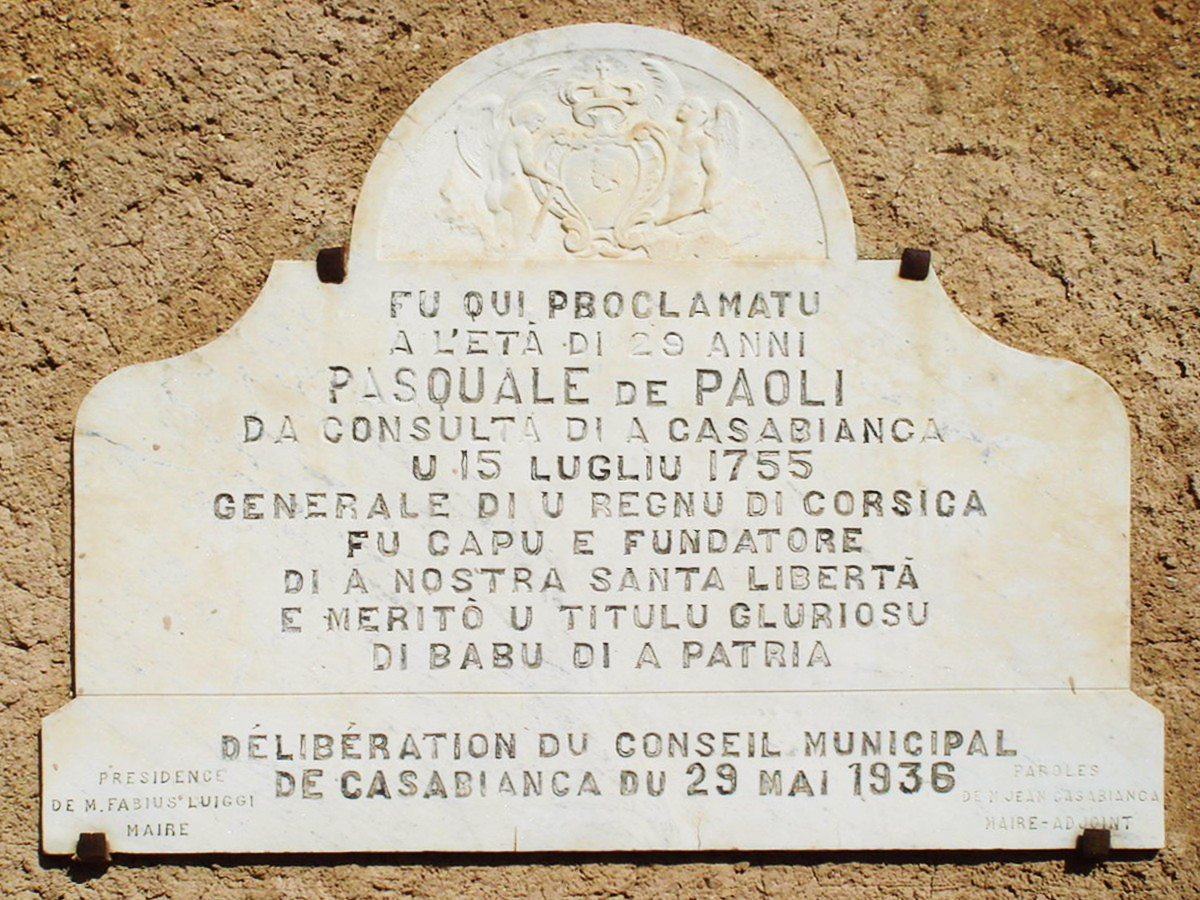
Commemorative plaque to Paoli at the monastery of Saint Anthony of Casabianca.

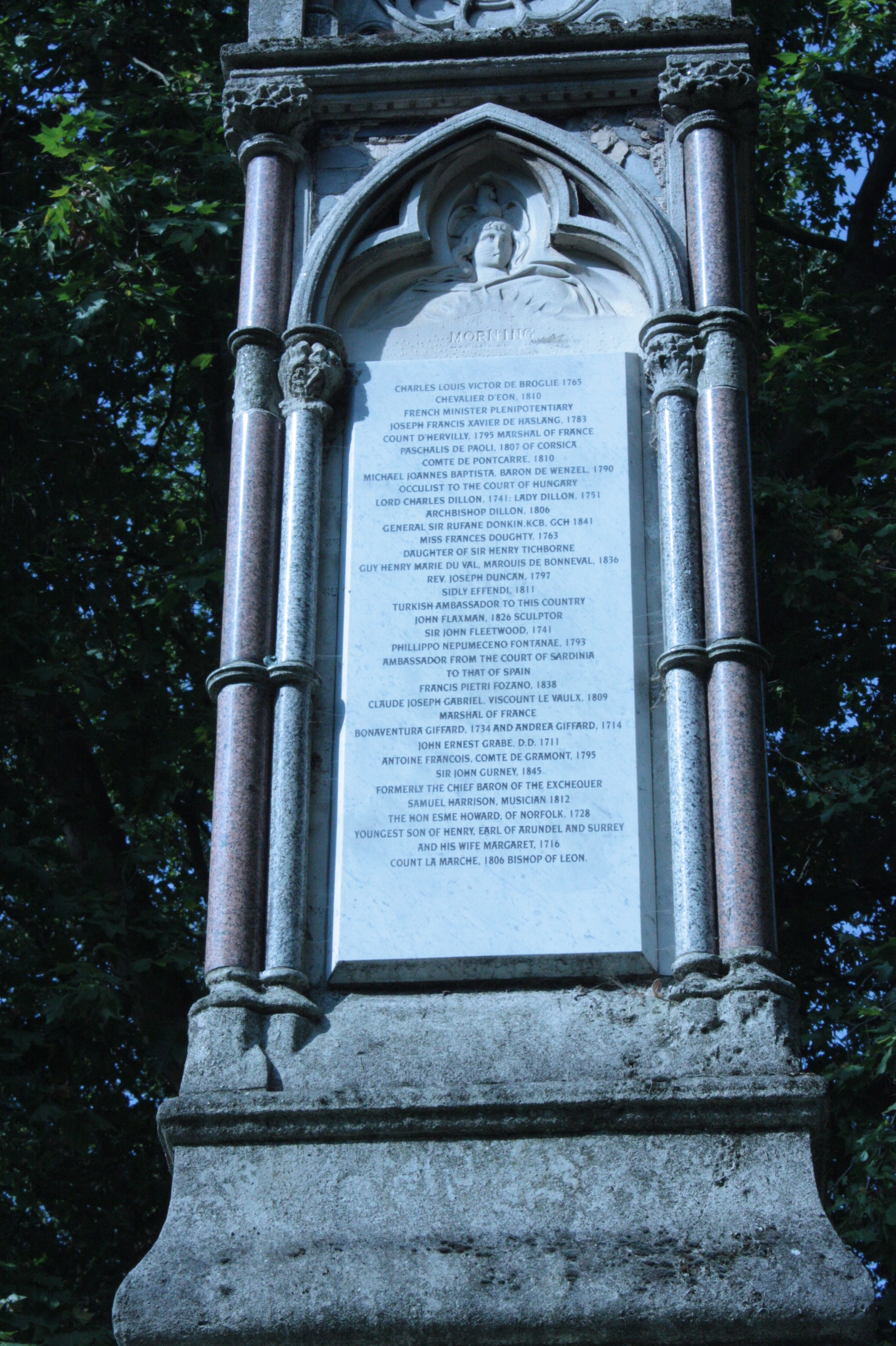
Paoli's name listed on the south face of the Burdett-Coutts Memorial Sundial in London

Filippo Antonio Pasquale de' Paoli FRS (Italian pronunciation: [fiˈlippo anˈtɔːnjo paˈskwaːle de ˈpaːoli]; Corsican: Pasquale or Pasquali Paoli; French: Philippe-Antoine-Pascal Paoli; 6 April 1725 – 5 February 1807) was a Corsican patriot, statesman, and military leader who was at the forefront of resistance movements against the Genoese and later French rule over the island. He became the President of the Executive Council of the General Diet of the People of Corsica and wrote the Constitution of the state.

The Corsican Republic (1755–1769) was a representative democracy asserting that the elected Diet of Corsican representatives had no master. Paoli held his office by election and not by appointment. It made him commander-in-chief of the armed forces as well as chief magistrate. Paoli's government claimed the same jurisdiction as the Republic of Genoa. In terms of de facto exercise of power, the Genoese held the coastal cities, which they could defend from their citadels, but the Corsican republic controlled the rest of the island from Corte, its capital.

Following the French conquest of Corsica in 1768, Paoli oversaw the Corsican resistance. Following the defeat of Corsican forces at the Battle of Ponte Novu he was forced into exile in Britain where he was a celebrated figure. He returned after the French Revolution, of which he was initially supportive. He later broke with the revolutionaries and helped to create the Anglo-Corsican Kingdom which lasted between 1794 and 1796. He again went into exile in Britain, setting sail in October 1795. France re-occupied the island soon after. Paoli died in London in February 1807.

Paoli was idolized by a young Napoleon Bonaparte, who was a Corsican nationalist at the time. The Bonapartes had assisted him during the French invasion but refused to go into exile with him and pledged allegiance to King Louis XV. Paoli saw the Bonapartes as collaborators, and upon regaining power during the French Revolution he tried to prevent Napoleon from returning to his position in the Corsican National Guard. In May 1793, Paolists detained Napoleon on his way to his post (though he was soon released), ransacked his home, and formally outlawed the Bonapartes via the Corsican parliament. These events and others in 1793 accelerated Napoleon's transition from Corsican to French nationalism. Napoleon never fully outgrew his fondness of Paoli, and had mixed feelings about him throughout the rest of his life.

== Biography ==
=== Early years ===
Paoli was born in the hamlet of Stretta, Morosaglia commune, part of the ancient parish of Rostino, Haute-Corse, Corsica. He was the second son of the physician and patriot Giacinto Paoli, who was to become one of three "Generals of the People" in the Corsican nationalist movement that rebelled against rule by the Republic of Genoa, which at that time they regarded as corrupt and tyrannical. Prior to that century Corsicans more or less accepted Genoan rule. By 1729, the year of first rebellion, the Genovese were regarded as failing in their task of government. The major problems were the high murder rate because of the custom of vendetta, the raiding of coastal villages by the Barbary pirates, oppressive taxes and economic depression.

In the rebellion of 1729 over a new tax, the Genovese withdrew into their citadels and sent for foreign interventions: first from the Habsburg Holy Roman Empire, and then from their enemies in the War of Austrian Succession, Bourbon France. Defeated by professional troops, the Corsicans ceded violence, but kept their organisation. After surrendering to the French in 1739, Giacinto Paoli went into exile in Naples with his then 14-year-old son, Pasquale. An older brother, Clemente, remained at home as a liaison to the revolutionary diet, or assembly of the people.

Corsica was subsequently distracted by the aforementioned War of the Austrian Succession, during which troops of a number of countries temporarily occupied the cities of Corsica. In Naples, Giacinto perceiving that he had a talented son, spared no effort or expense in his education, which was primarily classical. The enlightenment of which Pasquale was to become a part was neo-classical in its art, architecture and sentiments. Paoli is said once to have heard an old man on the road reciting Virgil, walked up behind him, clapped him on the back, and resumed reciting at the point where the other had left off. In 1741, Pasquale joined the Corsican regiment of the royal Neapolitan army and served in Calabria under his father.

Corsican exiles in Italy were seeking assistance for the revolution, including a skilled general. In 1736 the exiles of Genoa had discovered Theodor von Neuhoff, a soldier of fortune whom they were willing to make king, but he was unsuccessful, and in 1754, languished in a debtors' prison in London. The young Pasquale became of interest when in opposition to a plan to ask the Knights of Malta to assume command, he devised a plan for a native Corsican government. In that year, Giacinto decided that Pasquale was ready to supplant Theodor, and wrote to Vincente recommending that a general election be held. The subsequent popular election called by Vincente at Caccia made Pasquale General-in-Chief of Corsica, commander of all resistance.

Corsica at that time was still under the influence of feuding clans, as a result of which only the highland clans had voted in the election. The lowlanders now held an election of their own and elected Mario Matra as commander, who promptly attacked the supporters of Paoli. Moreover, Matra called on the Genovese for assistance, dragging Paoli into a conflict with them. Matra was killed shortly in battle and his support among the Corsicans collapsed.

Paoli's next task was to confine the Genovese to their citadels. His second was to frame a constitution, which when ratified by the population in 1755, set up a new republic, a representative democracy. Its first election made Paoli president, supplanting his former position.

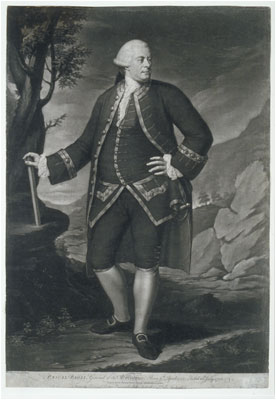
Pasquale Paoli by Henry Benbridge, 1768

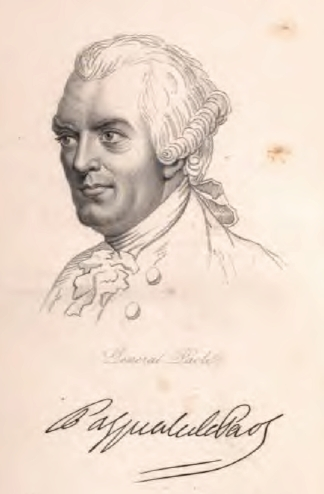
From a book by Edward Joy Morris, published 1855

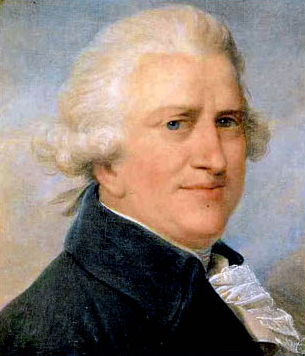
Portrait by Richard Cosway

=== President of the Corsican Republic ===
The Flag of the Corsican Republic (1755–1769)

In November 1755, the people of Corsica ratified a constitution that proclaimed Corsica a sovereign nation, independent from the Republic of Genoa. This was the first constitution written under Enlightenment principles. The new head of state, called the General, Paoli, was elected over rival candidate Emmanuele Matra by representatives of the pievi (68 ancient administrative units, each grouping several parishes), although only 16 of the 68 were represented. The president and author of the constitution occupied himself with building a modern state. For example, he founded a university at Corte. Linda Colley credits Paoli as writing the first ever written constitution of a nation state.

=== French invasion ===
Seeing that they had in effect lost control of Corsica, Genoa responded by ceding Corsica to the French by the treaty of Versailles in May 1768, as this was the only way to repay France for the debts incurred for the defence of the island. In September 1768, France proceeded to the conquest of the island. Paoli fought a guerilla war from the mountains but in 1769 he was defeated in the Battle of Ponte Novu by vastly superior forces and took refuge in England. Corsica officially became a French province in 1789.

=== First exile ===
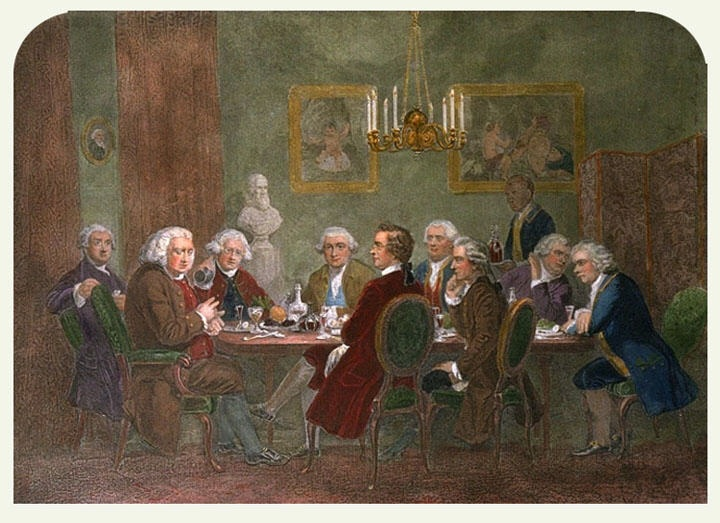
A literary party at Sir Joshua Reynolds's. Left to right: James Boswell, Samuel Johnson, Joshua Reynolds, David Garrick, Edmund Burke, Pasquale Paoli, Charles Burney, a servant (possibly Francis Barber), Thomas Warton, Oliver Goldsmith. (select a detail of the image for more information)

In London, Paoli attracted the attention of the Johnsonian circle almost immediately for which his expansive personality made him a natural fit. By the time Paoli entered the scene it had in part taken the form of The Club of mainly successful men of a liberal frame of mind. Such behaviour as Paoli showing his bullet-ridden coat to all visitors and then demanding a gratuity for the observation were amusing to the group, which had begun when its members were starting their careers and according to its chronicler James Boswell were themselves needy.

Paoli's memoirs were recorded by Boswell in his book, An Account of Corsica.

After a series of interviews with King George III, Paoli was given a pension by the Crown with the understanding that if he ever returned to Corsica in a position of authority, he would support British interests against the French. This was not, however, a cynical arrangement. Paoli became sincerely pro-British and had a genuine affection for his new friends, including the King, a predisposition that in the French Revolution led him into the royalist camp. The arrangement also was not a treaty of any sort, as at the time neither Paoli nor King George III would have any idea of future circumstances.

=== President of the department of Corsica ===
By the time of the French Revolution the name of Paoli had become something of an idol of liberty and democracy. In 1790 the revolutionary National Assembly in Paris passed a decree incorporating Corsica into France, essentially duplicating the work of 1780 but under a new authority. It granted amnesty to exiles, on which Paoli embarked immediately for Corsica. He arrived in time for the election of departmental officers at Orezza, ran for president, and was elected unanimously. Napoleon Bonaparte, organiser of the elections and active Jacobin, did not run at this time, but he was as much an admirer of Paoli as anyone.

Napoleon, on leave from his artillery regiment, returned to the regiment at Auxonne, where he was working on a history of Corsica. Writing to Paoli, he asked his opinion on some of it and for historical documents. The differences between the two men became apparent. Paoli thought the history amateurish and too impassioned and refused the documents; Napoleon at this point had no idea of Paoli's regal connections in Britain or moderate, even sympathetic, sentiments about royalty.

=== President of the British protectorate ===
Paoli split from the French Revolution over the issue of the execution of the King and threw in his lot with the royalist party. He did not make these views generally known, but when the revolutionary government ordered him to take Sardinia he put his nephew in charge of the expedition with secret orders to lose the conflict. In that case he was acting as a British agent, as the British had an interest in Sardinia they could not pursue if the French occupied it.

He had however also sent Napoleon Bonaparte as a colonel in command of two companies of Corsican guard (unofficially reinforced by 6000 revolutionaries from Marseille), which participated in the assault on La Maddalena Island in February 1793. It failed because the commander, Pietro Paolo Colonna-Cesari, failed to take appropriate military action, because the island had been reinforced just prior to the attack, and because the defenders seemed to know exactly where and when the revolutionaries were going to strike.

Napoleon perceived the situation during the first confrontation with his commander and assumed de facto command, but the attack failed and he barely escaped. Enraged, after having been a strong supporter and admirer of Paoli, he and the entire Bonaparte family denounced Paoli as a traitor before the French National Convention. Arrest warrants were issued and sent to Corsica along with a force intended to take the citadels from the royalists, who had supplanted the Genovese after the sale of Corsica. Combining the Paolists and royalists defeated the Bonapartes and drove them from the island.

Paoli then summoned a consulta (assembly) at Corte in 1793, with himself as president and formally seceded from France. He requested the protection of the British government, then at war with revolutionary France. In 1794, the British sent a fleet under Admiral Samuel Hood. This fleet had just been ejected from the French port of Toulon by a revolutionary army following the plan of Napoleon Bonaparte, for which he was promoted to Brigadier General. The royalists at Toulon also had requested British protection. Napoleon was now dispatched to deal with Italy as commander of the French forces there.

For a short time, Corsica was a protectorate of King George III, chiefly by the exertions of Hood's fleet (e.g. in the Siege of Calvi), and Paoli's co-operation. This period has become known as the "Anglo-Corsican Kingdom" because George III was accepted as sovereign head of state, but this was not an incorporation of Corsica into the British Empire. The relationship between Paoli's government and the British was never clearly defined, resulting in numerous questions of authority. At last, the Crown invited Paoli to resign and return to exile in Britain with a pension, which, having no other options now, he did. Not long after, the French reconquered the island and all questions of Corsican sovereignty came to an end until the 20th century.

=== Second exile and death ===
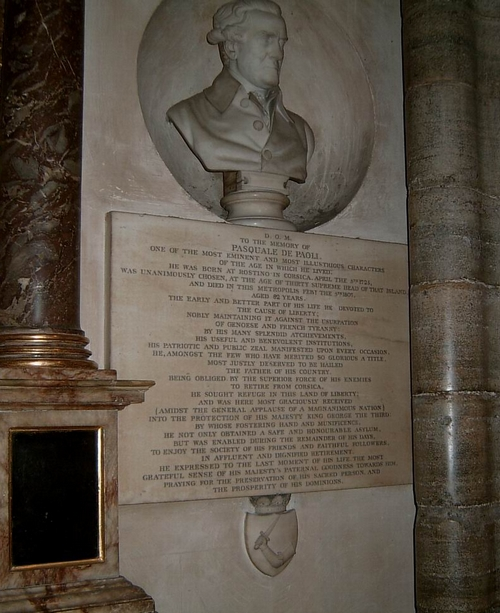
The Cenotaph of Pasquale Paoli, in Westminster Abbey (London)

Paoli set sail for England in October 1795, where he lived out his final years. Pasquale Paoli died on 5 February 1807, and was buried in Old St. Pancras Churchyard in London. His name is listed on the 1879 Burdett-Coutts Memorial Sundial amongst the important graves lost.

A bust was placed in Westminster Abbey. In 1889, his bones were brought to Corsica in a British frigate and interred at the family home under a memorial in the Italian language.

== Personal life ==
Pasquale never married and as far as is known had no heirs. Information about his intimate life is mainly lacking. It was rumoured that he had an affair with Maria Cosway but this is unsubstantiated. Robert Harvey claims he was a homosexual, when discussing how Carlo Buonaparte became Paoli's personal secretary.

== Paoli and Italian irredentism ==
Insofar as Italian irredentism was a political or historical movement, Pasquale Paoli lived long before its time and did not have anything to do with the movement that ended with the occupation of Corsica by Italian fascist troops in late 1942, during World War II.

There is no question, however, that Paoli was sympathetic to Italian culture and regarded his own native language as an Italian dialect (Corsican is an Italic language closely related to Tuscan, Sicilian and, to some extent, Sardinian language). He was considered by Niccolò Tommaseo, who collected his Lettere (Letters), as one of the precursors of the Italian irredentism. The "Babbu di a Patria" (Father of the fatherland), as Pasquale Paoli was nicknamed by the Corsicans, wrote in his Letters the following appeal in 1768 against the French invaders:

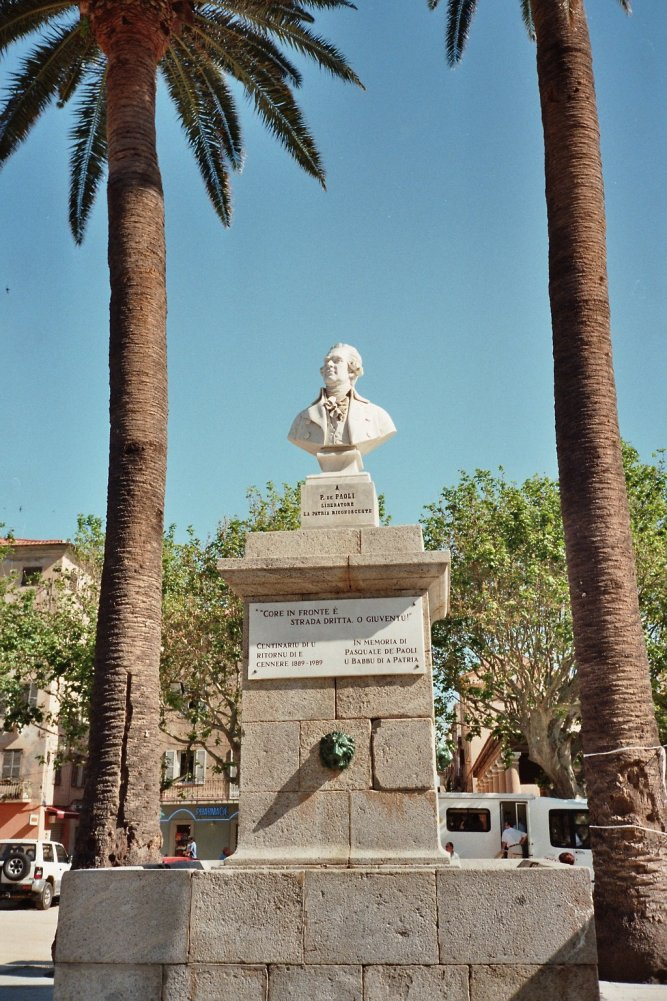
A monument to Pasquale Paoli at Ile Rousse in Corsica: the Corsican hero made Italian the official language of his Corsican Republic in 1755

We are Corsicans by birth and sentiment, but first of all we feel Italian by language, origins, customs, traditions; and Italians are all brothers and united in the face of history and in the face of God ... As Corsicans we wish to be neither slaves nor "rebels" and as Italians we have the right to deal as equals with the other Italian brothers ... Either we shall be free or we shall be nothing... Either we shall win or we shall die (against the French), weapons in hand ... The war against France is right and holy as the name of God is holy and right, and here on our mountains will appear for Italy the sun of liberty....

(Siamo còrsi per nascita e sentimento ma prima di tutto ci sentiamo italiani per lingua, origini, costumi, tradizioni e gli italiani sono tutti fratelli e solidali di fronte alla storia e di fronte a Dio… Come còrsi non-vogliamo essere né schiavi né "ribelli" e come italiani abbiamo il diritto di trattare da pari con gli altri fratelli d'Italia… O saremo liberi o non saremo niente… O vinceremo con l'onore o soccomberemo (contro i francesi) con le armi in mano... La guerra con la Francia è giusta e santa come santo e giusto è il nome di Dio, e qui sui nostri monti spunterà per l'Italia il sole della libertà…)

Paoli wanted Italian to be the official language of his Corsican Republic. His Corsican Constitution of 1755 was written in Italian and the short-lived university he founded in the city of Corte in 1765 used Italian as teaching language.

== Paoli commemorated in the United States ==
The American Sons of Liberty movement were inspired by Paoli. Ebenezer McIntosh, a leader of the Sons of Liberty, named his son Paschal Paoli McIntosh in honour of him. In 1768, the editor of the New York Journal described Paoli as "the greatest man on earth". Several places in the United States are named after him. These include:

- Paoli, Colorado
- Paoli, Indiana
- Paoli, Kentucky
- Paoli, Oklahoma
- Paoli, Pennsylvania, which was named after "General Paoli's Tavern" a meeting-point of the Sons of Liberty and homage to the "General of the Corsicans".
- Paoli, Wisconsin

== See also ==
- Corsican Italians
- History of Corsica
