= James Harington Evans =

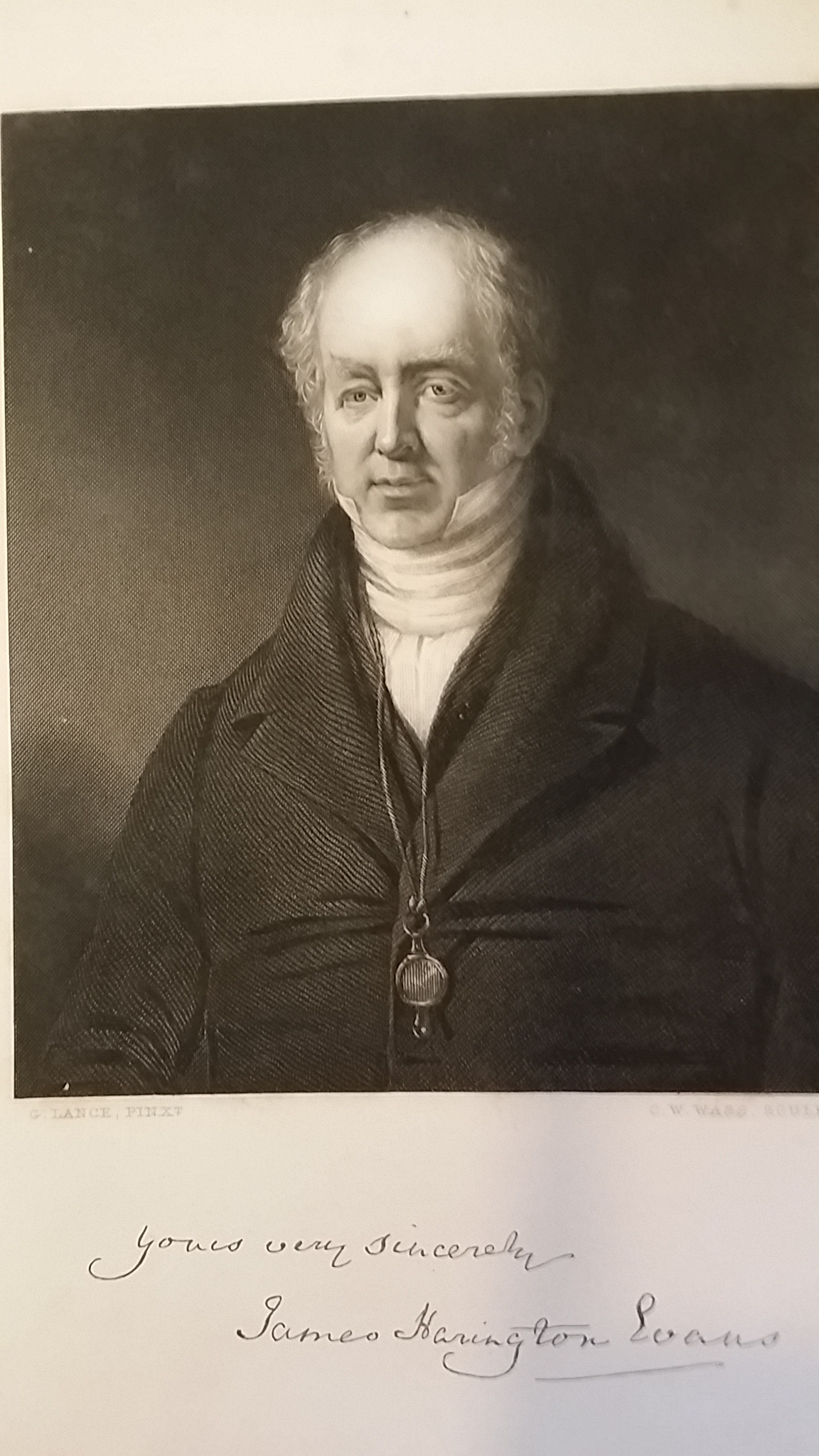
Frontispiece from biography

James Harington Evans (1785-1849) was ordained as a Church of England clergyman in 1810. During his early years as a curate he suffered a crisis following the death of his first child. One of his parishioners suggested he study a volume of sermons by the Rev John Hill (1711–46). As he read his well-being improved and he started to question some of the doctrinal beliefs in the Church of England. He shared these ideas with his congregation, causing a split in the community and was asked by his rector to leave. Within a few years he became a Baptist minister and the pastor of John Street Chapel in Bloomsbury, where he remained for thirty years. After his death it was said of him that, he was to be admired in almost everything except his Nonconformity.

== Father ==
Evans’ father was Rev James Evans, who attended Wadham College, Oxford (matriculated 1777). In 1782 he was appointed rector of South Reston, Lincolnshire and from 1783 he was sharing duties with his brother, Rev John Evans, as the curates for the Wiltshire parishes of Teffont Evias, Fovant, Hindon and Pertwood. At about this same time he was also appointed the head of the Salisbury City-grammar School. He later became the domestic chaplain to the Earl of Malmesbury; the master of the grammar school in the Close, Salisbury, and one of the vicars’ choral of Salisbury Cathedral. He lost his first wife Sarah Evans in 1804, and remarried the same year to Mary Ann Cooper, daughter of a linen draper. He died in 1825 and is buried with his first wife in the north transept of Salisbury Cathedral, commemorated by a white tablet on the east wall. His sister was Elizabeth, who married the Rev Isaac Hodgson, the curate of Bramshott, Hampshire.

== Early years ==
James Harington Evans was born in Salisbury, Wiltshire on the 15 April 1785 and baptised October 1786. His father was head of the Salisbury City-grammar School and it was there that young Evans received his early education. He was an eager student and by the age of eleven had attained a high level of achievement. It was deemed appropriate for him to be removed from the school and placed with his uncle, Rev Isaac Hodgson, who was a clever and intuitive tutor. In later years Evans regarded the time he spent with the Hodgsons as the most pleasant of his youth, and remembered Hodgson’s wife, aunt Elizabeth, with great affection.

In 1799 young Evans visited Oxford with his father and it was here that the fourteen year old gained a scholarship at Wadham College. His youth initially singled him out for some attention from the older boys, but he eventually fitted in, and for a period enjoyed the social side of university life. He eventually knuckled down to study and was awarded B.A in 1803, M.A. in 1808 and became a fellow in 1806. He was ordained a deacon in June 1808 and became a priest in December 1810. This was the same year that he married his first wife, Caroline Joyce, from Freshford, Somerset.

=== Death of mother ===
His mother had been ill for several years with a lung condition and Evans was repeatedly called home from the college as her condition worsened. When she finally died in February 1804 he became traumatised, suffered chest pains, lost weight and was sent to the Isle of Wight to recuperate. He stayed at Cowes and formed a lifelong attachment to the area.

== Early years as curate ==
His first sermon was given at Worldham, Hampshire, where his uncle was the curate. His shyness made this an uncomfortable experience, and remained an issue with him for the rest of his life. To combat this he prepared his sermons in advance, reading these from the pulpit, and admitted that in his early days he carried a “vial of wine” in his pocket to help with his nerves.

In 1809 Evans began work as a curate at Worplesdon, Surrey, followed by Enville, Staffordshire. After his engagement to Caroline Joyce he returned to the south of England so that the couple could be closer to their families. Evans’ father offered to buy him an advowson, but instead he took up a curacy at the coastal parish of Milford and Hordle, Hampshire.

In June 1811 the couple’s first child was born, but died within a year. In their despair Evans questioned his own faith and religious commitment. A parishioner, aware of his troubled mind, offered him a volume of sermons by the Rev John Hill. Reading these came as a revelation to Evans, and as a result his well-being improved and the character of his ministry changed from that of pastoral to evangelical.

He began taking his message to the local community by giving evening lectures, visiting people at their home and in the fields, giving bible readings and taking prayers. His sermons attracted interest from locals and outsiders; however, all was not well. His followers in the community were mainly from the working class sector, but amongst the gentry and employers there was enmity toward his ministry. Some walked out of his church before his sermons, or left and padlocked their pews. Resentment was such that farm workers and servants who attended his services at the vicarage were sacked. Evans later realised that during this period his enthusiasm had induced errors of judgement, which he afterwards regretted. One of his friends said of him that:

He [Evans] was at that time living in a remarkable separation from the world, feeling it extremely oppressive to him to have any fellowship with men who had no fellowship with God.

This was demonstrated during a church service in Milford when he pointed a finger at Admiral Sir William Cornwallis, and thundered “I see the devil walking in the midst of you”. In protest the Admiral transferred to another church four miles away, not to return until Evans was replaced. Cornwallis owned Newlands Manor, Milford, and lived there with his companion Mary Anne Theresa Whitby and her daughter, Theresa John Cornwallis Whitby; she was later known as, Mrs West, mother of William Cornwallis-West. Mrs West wrote that the area was in the grip of "religious mania in which none was so mad as the Vicar". Her mother once visited an "evening conventicle" held at Rev Evans' vicarage:

She found men, women and children, sprawling on the floor of the drawing room, under the piano, up the stairs, and under the stairs, all grovelling head downwards and in loud tones calling on the Lord Jesus to come and save them

The situation in the parish came to a head in 1815 when his rector gave Evans six month notice to quit. It was then that Evans took the decision to secede from the Church of England and leave Milford. The reasons for his discontent with the established church included the baptism of infants and the union of the Church with the State. His relatives and those of his wife were "greatly displeased and wounded" by his actions. His decision to secede endangered the financial security and the reputation of his family. Evans needed an exit strategy to tide him over, and this was provided by Rev George Baring.

== Western schism ==
Rev Baring (1781–1854) was the son of Francis Baring, 1st Baronet, co-founder of Barings Bank. He was privately educated and worked for his father for some years before deciding to take holy orders in the Church of England. He attended Magdalene College, Cambridge in 1813, and was ordained deacon the same year and priest in 1814. From 1813 he was curate to Rev Thomas Tregenna Biddulph, in Durston and Lyng near Taunton, Somerset. In 1815 he became the minister for the parish of Winterbourne Stoke, Wiltshire, under the patronage of his brother, Alexander Baring, who was the Member of Parliament for Taunton.

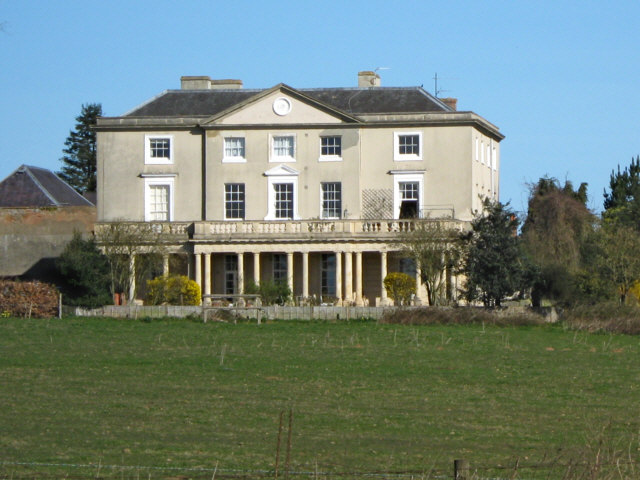
Walford House

Within a few months Rev Baring seceded from the Church of England, moving to Walford House, Taunton where he purchased the Octagon Chapel in Middle Street, and ministered as Trinitarian or Particular Baptist. Other clergy who had seceded from the established church joined him in Taunton, including Rev Thomas Snow (1786-1867), Rev George Bevan (1782–1819) and James Harrington Evans. Several members of Rev Baring's family supported and encouraged him in this venture, including his evangelical sister, Harriet (Baring) Wall, and brother, Sir Thomas Baring of Stratton Park. Others drawn into this circle included Baring's brothers-in-law Thomas Read Kemp and Philip Laycock Story (1782–1843).

Both Snow and Bevan, like the Baring siblings, were the children of bankers; Snow's father was George Snow of Snow, Statton and Paul, and Bevan's father was Silvanus Bevan (1743–1830) of Barclay, Bevan and Bening. Before they seceded, Snow and his curate Bevan had been ministers in the parishes of Micheldever, East Stratton, Popham and Northington, under the patronage of wealthy banker, Henry Drummond (1786–1860) of The Grange, and Sir Thomas Baring. Snow had been the minister at Winterbourne Stoke preceding Rev Baring's brief tenure, and he was on affable terms with James Harington Evans, who officiated at his wedding.

Baptisms at the Octagon Chapel were dispensed to those who professed faith, and were administered by immersion. Evans and George Baring were baptised in this manner by George Bevan at the chapel in June 1816. Evans then spent several months preaching in the surrounding area before moving with his family to London at the end of 1816.

Rev George Baring continued with his ministry until 1819 when he left Britain. It seems that after this he had little involvement with religious affairs. Rev Snow was eventually accepted back into the Church of England after a period of "atonement". Rev Bevan remained in conflict with the Established Church over the doctrine of the Trinity and died in 1819. In the same year James Harington Evans published his views on this subject in a pamphlet titled A Series of Dialogues on Important Subjects. This work was considered by some to be heretical, and he came to regret and feel ashamed of this period in his life. His ministry suffered and the congregation became just a handful. His response was to publish an unreserved retraction and buy up all the copies of the work that remained at the booksellers. In 1826 he published a more detailed explanation in a pamphlet titled Letters to a Friend. His views on the Trinity had been formed after he read the works of Dr Isaac Watts and this humiliating experience made him less trusting of others. It was said that after this "he walked softly all his years in the bitterness of his soul".

== Chapel at Milford ==
By the time Evans left Milford in 1816 he had a significant number of followers. His revival meetings had been held in homes and at the vicarage, but a dedicated place of worship was required. Evans and friends funded the building of a chapel in Milford and this was opened for public worship in January 1816. Evans appointed lay preacher James Turquand (1787-1836) as the minister, a position he held for the next twenty-one years. Turquand was baptised in August 1816 and the following day he baptised fourteen people. His background had been in agriculture, and he worked for many years as a land steward at Norman Court, the Hampshire estate of Harriet (Baring) Wall and her husband Charles Wall. Evans continued to take an interest in the ministry at the Milford Baptist church, raising funds, visiting the area and corresponding. The church still remains in Barnes Lane, Milford, where it was built over 200 years ago.

== John Street Chapel ==
When Evans moved to London in 1816 he preached in various places of worship before becoming the pastor of the John Street Chapel, Bloomsbury. The building had been leased to him for life by banker Henry Drummond, who was described as 'a disorderly force of intellect and character'. Drummond was a philanthropist, wrote numerous books, supported missionary work, became a member of parliament at the age of twenty-five, and helped found the Catholic Apostolic Church. This was a movement commonly known as Irvingism, based on Edward Irving’s prophesy that the Second Advent was imminent.

Irving was a charismatic preacher from Scotland, who moved to London in about 1821 and became the minister of the Caledonian Church, Hatton Garden, London. The church later relocated to Regent Square, about half a mile from the John Street Chapel, where he occasionally preached in the early days. Many of those involved with the Irvingism cult were known to Evans, and some were his oldest most faithful friends, but he now considered them to be heretics and their friendship lost to him, including his patron, Henry Drummond. Evans remained friends with Harriet (Baring) Wall and occasionally stayed with her in her Lymington home, just a few miles from Milford. From there he was able to visit another old friend and mentor, Rev Richard Adams in Cowes, IoW.

=== Robert Cleaver Chapman ===
Deacons helped Evans run the chapel and in 1823 one of these, lawyer John Whitmore, invited a 20 year old Robert Cleaver Chapman (1803–1902) to hear Evans preach. This was a life changing experience for him and he asked to be baptised. In response, Evans told him to wait until he fully understood the implications and responsibilities of this action, but Chapman persisted and eventually Evans agreed. With mentoring from Evans, he became involved with the ministry of the John Street Chapel, giving sermons and helping with the poor in the surrounding area. In 1831 he was asked by his cousin, Thomas Pugsley (1794-1834), to preach at a workhouse in Devon. This led to an invitation to become the pastor in a Particular Baptist chapel in Barnstable. He was unable to reconcile differences within the congregation and in about 1834 a split occurred. Chapman became the pastor of the Open Brethren in Barnstable, locating eventually to a chapel in Bear Street. In 1848, he with others tried to intercede in a dispute between two leading figures in the Brethren movement, John Nelson Darby and Benjamin Wills Newton. In this he failed, and a division occurred resulting in the formation of the Open Brethren and the Exclusive Brethren. Some of the Darby supporters were critical of Chapman, but Darby told them “You leave that man alone, he lives what I teach”, and “We talk of heavenlies, but Robert Chapman lives in them”.

Chapman occasionally visited London, staying with Evans and preaching at the John Street Chapel. In 1842 Evans wrote of him:

R. Chapman has just left us. He slept here last night after preaching for me at John Street. Oh, what a man of God is he! What grace does he exhibit! Courage, meekness, love, self-denial, tenderness, perseverance, love for souls — all springing out of love of Christ and God — seem beauteously blended together in beautiful symmetry. But by the grace of God he is what he is, and by the grace of God we can be what he is.

However, Evans was not so complementary about the Brethren, that he considered separated the family of God.

=== Rev Charles Shepherd ===
In about 1843 Evans started to suffer from head pains. A dozen leeches were administered by his physician but his condition failed to improve. His doctor then suggested that he rest and have a change of diet. This eased the problem for a period, but he was unable to continue full time work. Requiring assistance he appointed Baptist minister, Rev Charles Arundel Morice Shepherd (1806-1855), who he knew from his visits to the Barnstable area of Devon. He was pastor of the Baptist chapels in the local parishes of Eastacombe, Hiscott and Lovacott, built by Chapman’s cousin, Thomas Pugsley. Evans’ health never fully recovered, although at times he was able to minister on a limited basis. In 1847 he had a bout of bronchitis brought on after he attended the funeral of his step-mother on a bitterly cold day. In 1849 Rev Shepard was indisposed and Evans pondered asking Rev Baptist Wriothesley Noel to minister temporarily. Noel had recently seceded from the Established Church and Evans was of a mind to offer him the chapel on the surrender of his own life interest. In August 1849 Noel was baptised into the John Street Chapel by Rev Shepherd with Evans in attendance.

=== Rev Baptist Wriothesley Noel ===
The Hon. and Rev. Baptist Wriothesley Noel, M.A., (1799–1873) was the son of Baroness Barham and Sir Gerard Noel-Noel, Bart; one of his brothers was Earl of Gainsborough. He was educated at Trinity College, Cambridge, becoming one of the chaplains to the Queen in August 1841. For twenty-one years he was the minister of St John’s Chapel, Bedford-row, London, resigning in 1848 when he seceded from the Established Church. As a Dissenting minister he could have been prohibited from preaching within his former London diocese, but Bishop Blomfield took no such action. Noel swore an oath as prescribed by 52 Geo Vol III, before preaching his first sermon at Mr Binney’s, Congregational Weigh House Chapel, where he received the Lord’s Supper.

Noel was looking for another chapel, having relinquished the lease on the St John’s Chapel. It was rumoured that he was interested in Mr Mortimer’s Chapel, Grays-inn Road but this came to nothing. Evans was in correspondence with Henry Drummond’s solicitor about him parting with the lease on his John Street Chapel, and it was his wish that Noel should take this on with congregational approval. In a letter, dated 7 August 1849, Evans indicated his belief that the deal for Noel to purchase the Chapel had gone through. However, in a letter of the 5 September 1849 he acknowledged that this information had been incorrect.

== Final days ==
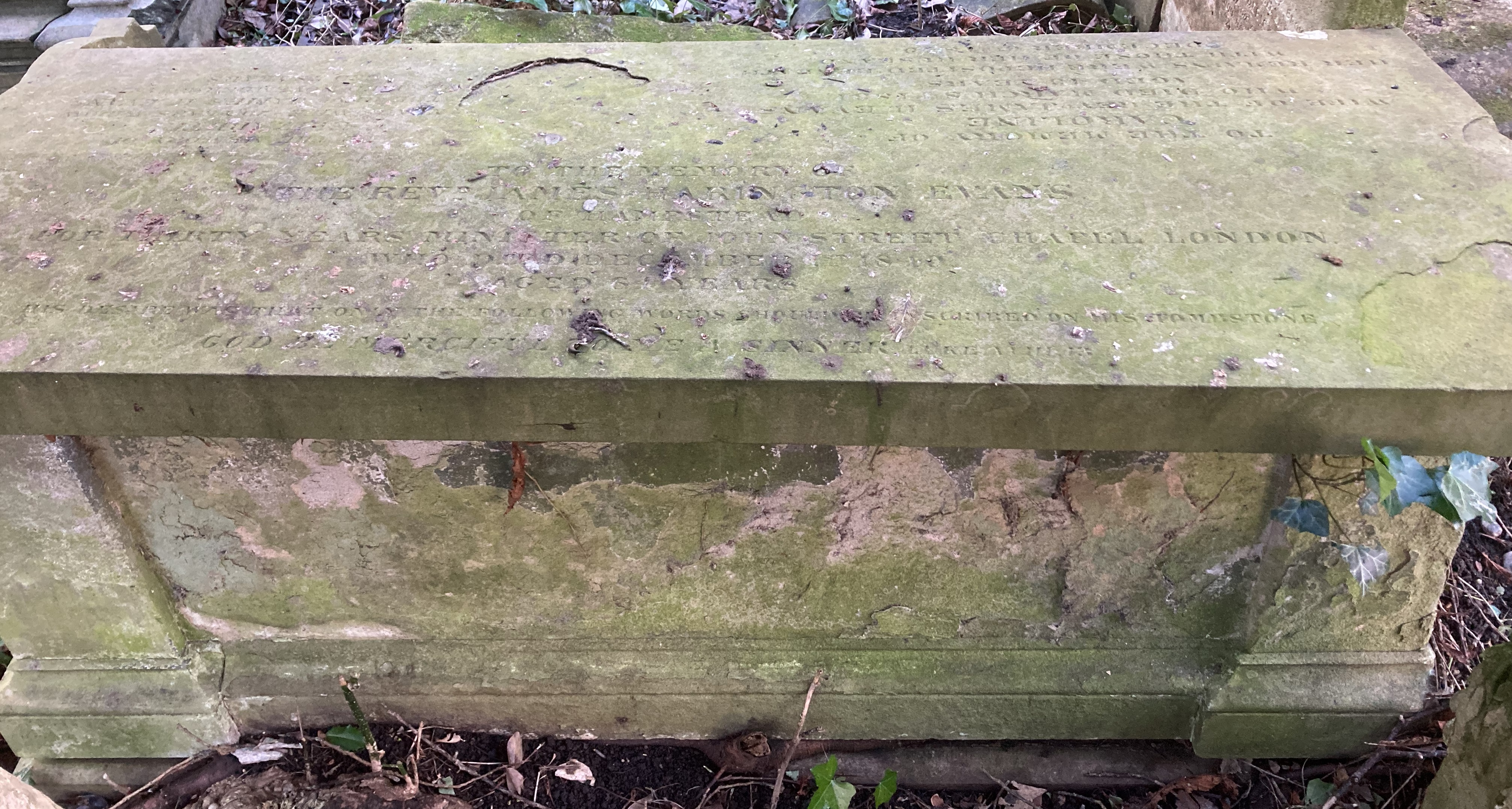
Grave of James Harrington Evans in Highgate Cemetery

On this same day Evans was driving a hired phaeton with his wife and a friend in Scotland, where he had been staying since July of that year. Going downhill the horse bolted, and at a bridge one of the wheels struck the side, throwing Evans off. His wife and friend remained in the carriage and were safe, the horse being stopped some distance away. Evans claimed in a letter that although he lost consciousness, his only other injuries were severe bruising. But shortly an abscess formed on the arm that had been worst affected in the fall and a fever developed. He gradually weakened until on 1 December 1849 he died in Stonehaven, Scotland. His remains were returned to London and he was buried on the western side of Highgate Cemetery on the 6 December. Rev Charles Shepherd and Rev Baptist Noel spoke at the funeral; Rev Octavius Winslow preached a funeral sermon at the John Street Chapel on the following Sunday. Winslow’s mother, Mrs. Mary Winslow, had been a congregant of the John Street Chapel since 1828.

About this same time it was confirmed that Baptist Noel was the new minister at the John Street Chapel, a position he held until he retired in 1869.

== Family ==
Evans first wife was Caroline Joyce (1787–1831) and they had three children who survived to adulthood: Rev James Joyce Evans (1813–1881); Caroline Evans (1815–1882) and Frederic Hodgson Evans (1821–1877).

Evans married his second wife, Elizabeth Bird (1799–1878), in 1833. She was the daughter of Lucy Wilberforce Bird (1768–1847) and Robert Bird (1761–1842). Her brothers included Robert Merttins Bird and Edward Bird, father of Isabella Bird. There were no children from this marriage.

== Writings ==
Evans was the author of several books and hymns; many are listed in the British Library Catalogue and several are available in the public domain.
