= Baring family properties =

Baring family properties is a listing of significant properties in England that were purchased or developed by members of the Baring family, mostly during the period between 1820 and 1890.

The Baring family, established in England by German immigrant Johann (John) Baring (1697–1748), rose from moderate success in England during the 18th century to wealth and prominence in the 19th century and into the 20th. Following the common practice of wealthy European families, the Barings bought, rebuilt, remodeled, expanded and furnished lavish townhouses and huge country estates. Many Barings were raised to the peerage in recognition of services rendered to the United Kingdom, and these estates became the seats of various baronets, barons and earls. After the Panic of 1890 nearly ruined Edward Baring, 1st Baron Revelstoke, along with several other family members and bank partners, the family's property holdings began to decrease. Most of the estates were long gone by the time the final crash of Barings Bank in 1995 claimed the bank's longtime headquarters at 8 Bishopsgate.

Property	Acquired	Owner(s)	Current status (2010)
Larkbeare House, Exeter, Devon (built 15th century)	1737	Johann Baring (1697–1748) Charles Baring (1742–1829) Sir Thomas Baring (1772–1848)	Owned by City of Exeter, mostly rebuilt; one historic wall listed
Mount Radford House, Exeter, Devon (built 1570, remodeled in Georgian style)	1770	John Baring (1730–1816) Sir Thomas Baring (1772–1848)	demolished 1902
Manor House of Lee, Lewisham, London (designed by Richard Jupp, built 1772)	1796	Sir Francis Baring, 1st Baronet (1740–1810)	Lee Public Library; the grounds are a public park Manor House Gardens
Stratton Park, Micheldever, Winchester, Hampshire (remodeled, Greek Revival style portico added by George Dance the Younger)	1801	Sir Francis Baring, 1st Baronet (1740–1810)	Stratton Park became the seat of Baron Northbrook. Original house demolished in 1960s; freestanding Greek portico remains
8 Bishopsgate, City of London	1806	Baring Brothers & Co.	Originally a Georgian style house; later rebuilt as a banking hall; replaced with a skyscraper in 1981, which still stands
The Grange, Northington, Winchester, Hampshire (built 1670–1673, remodeled 1804–1809 by William Wilkins in Greek Revival style, landscaping by Robert Adam	1816	Alexander Baring, 1st Baron Ashburton (1774–1848)	A Scheduled Ancient Monument. Alexander later bought many other estates in the area, including Itchen Stoke and Itchen Abbas
Bath House, 82 Piccadilly, London (bought from Earl of Bath and rebuilt)	1821	Alexander Baring, 1st Baron Ashburton (1774–1848)	sold to Julius Wernher, one of the "Randlords", after 1890; demolished 1960
Cromer Hall, Norfolk (designed by Norfolk architect William Donthorne in Gothic Revival style, built 1829)	1823–1827	Henry Baring (1776–1848)	Henry's son Evelyn (1841–1917) became the 1st Earl of Cromer. Cromer Hall is still a private residence, but not in the Baring family.
Norman Court, West Tytherley, Salisbury, Wiltshire	1815	Thomas Baring (1799–1873)	now a non-profit boarding school
Membland, Devon	1877	Edward Baring, 1st Baron Revelstoke (1828–1897)	Membland Hall has been demolished, but many of the estate buildings remain, converted mostly to private residences (or a B&B) as the estate was sold off piecemeal to pay Revelstoke's debts following the Panic of 1890.
Dartmouth House 37 Charles Street, Mayfair, London (combined with #38 in 1886)	1870	Edward Baring, 1st Baron Revelstoke (1828–1897)	sold to pay Revelstoke's debts following the Panic of 1890
Nubia House, Isle of Wight	unknown	Sir Godfrey Baring, 1st Baronet (1871–1957)	became a boarding school in the 20th century, now demolished
Ten-Acre Field, Lee, Lewisham, London	Unknown	Thomas Baring, 1st Earl of Northbrook (?–1898)	Gifted to public use in 1898, opened as Northbrook Park in 1903
3 Carlton House Terrace, London (built in 1827–1832 to overall designs by John Nash; grade I listed)	1904–1929	John Baring, 2nd Baron Revelstoke (1863–1929)	now houses the Royal Academy of Engineering; the grade I listing ensures preservation
