= Charles Baring (disambiguation) =

Charles Baring (1807–1879) was an English bishop of Durham.

Charles Baring may also refer to:

- Sir Charles Baring, 2nd Baronet (1898–1990) of the Baring baronets
- Charles Baring, 2nd Baron Howick of Glendale (born 1937)
- Charles Baring of Baring family properties

== See also ==
- Charles Edward Baring Young (1850–1928), English educationalist and Conservative politician
