= Baring baronets of Larkbeer (1793) =

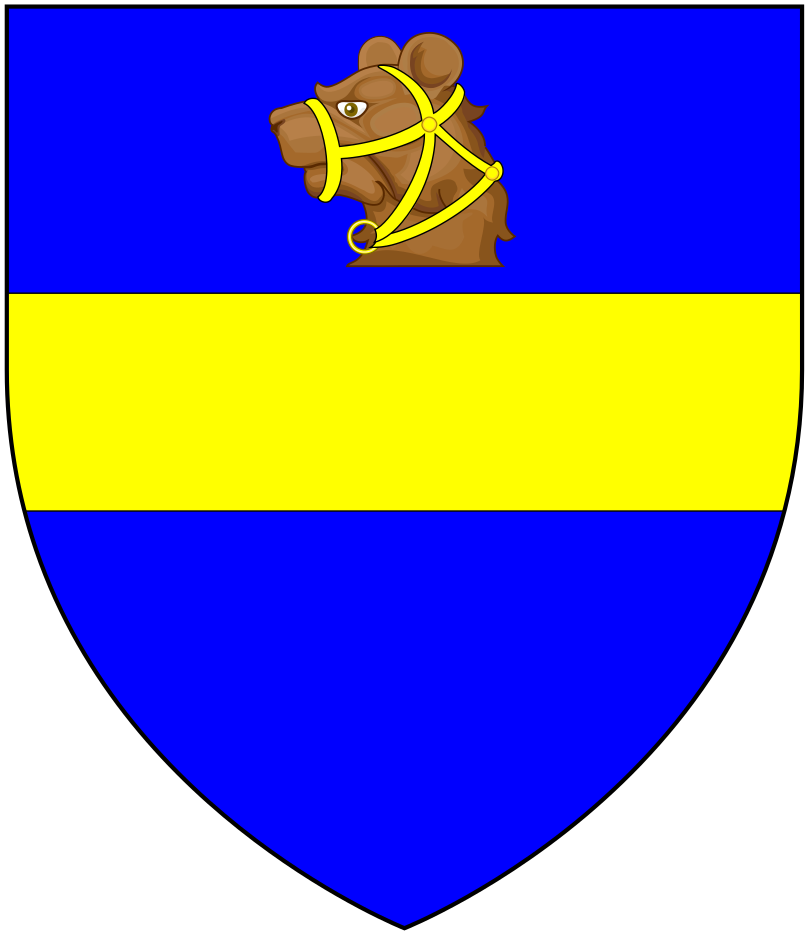
Escutcheon of the Baring baronets of Larkbeer

The Baring baronetcy, of Larkbeer in the County of Devon, was created in the Baronetage of Great Britain on 29 May 1793 for the banker Francis Baring. He was also a merchant, and at the time of creation was Chairman of the East India Company. He sat in Parliament for several constituencies from 1784 to 1806.

== Baring baronets, of Larkbeer (1793) ==
- Francis Baring, 1st Baronet (1740–1810)
- Thomas Baring, 2nd Baronet (1772–1848)
- Francis Baring, 3rd Baronet (1796–1866) created Baron Northbrook in 1866.

For further succession, see Baron Northbrook.

== Notes ==
Baronetage of Great Britain
Preceded by Smith-Burges baronets	Baring baronets of Larkbeer; 29 May 1793	Succeeded by Saxton baronets
