= Albury Park =

Country house in Surrey, UK

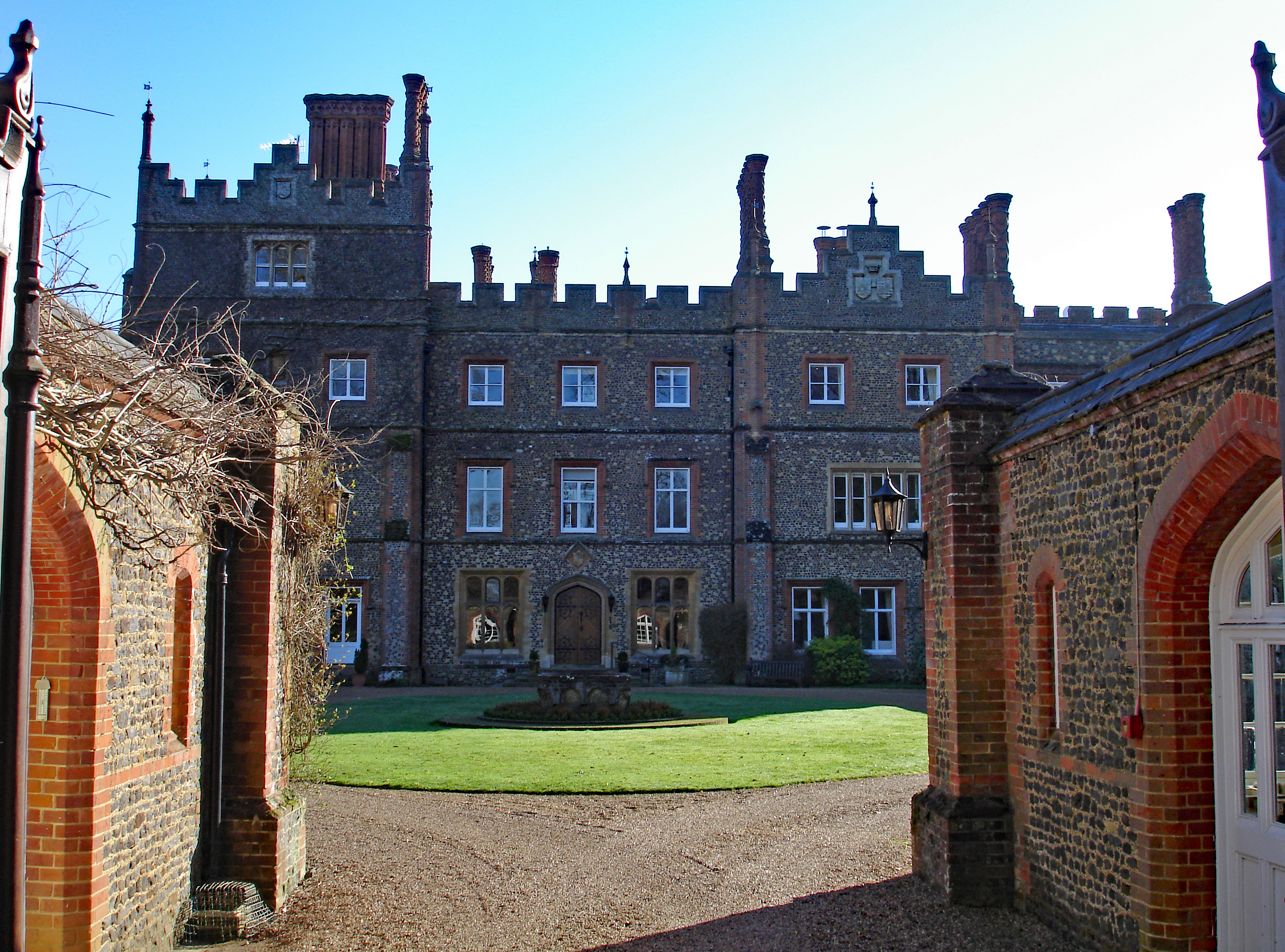
- The mansion

- Location within Surrey
- 51°13′07″N 0°28′41″W
- Location: Albury, Surrey
- OS grid reference: TQ 06390 47700

History
- Built: 17th century
- Rebuilt: 1800; early 19th century; 1846-1852

Site notes
- Area: 130 ha (320 acres)
- Architects: George and John Evelyn; Sir John Soane; Henry Hakewill; Augustus Pugin
- Owner: Albury Estates

Listed Building – Grade II*
- Official name: Albury Park
- Designated: 14 June 1967
- Reference no.: 1029565

National Register of Historic Parks and Gardens
- Official name: Albury Park
- Designated: 1 July 1984
- Reference no.: 1000299

Albury Park is a country park and Grade II* listed historic country house in Surrey, England. It covers over 150 acres (0.61 km^{2}); within this area is the old village of Albury, which consists of three or four houses and a church. The River Tillingbourne runs through the grounds. The gardens of Albury Park are Grade I listed on the Register of Historic Parks and Gardens.

== History ==
=== Pre–1890 ===
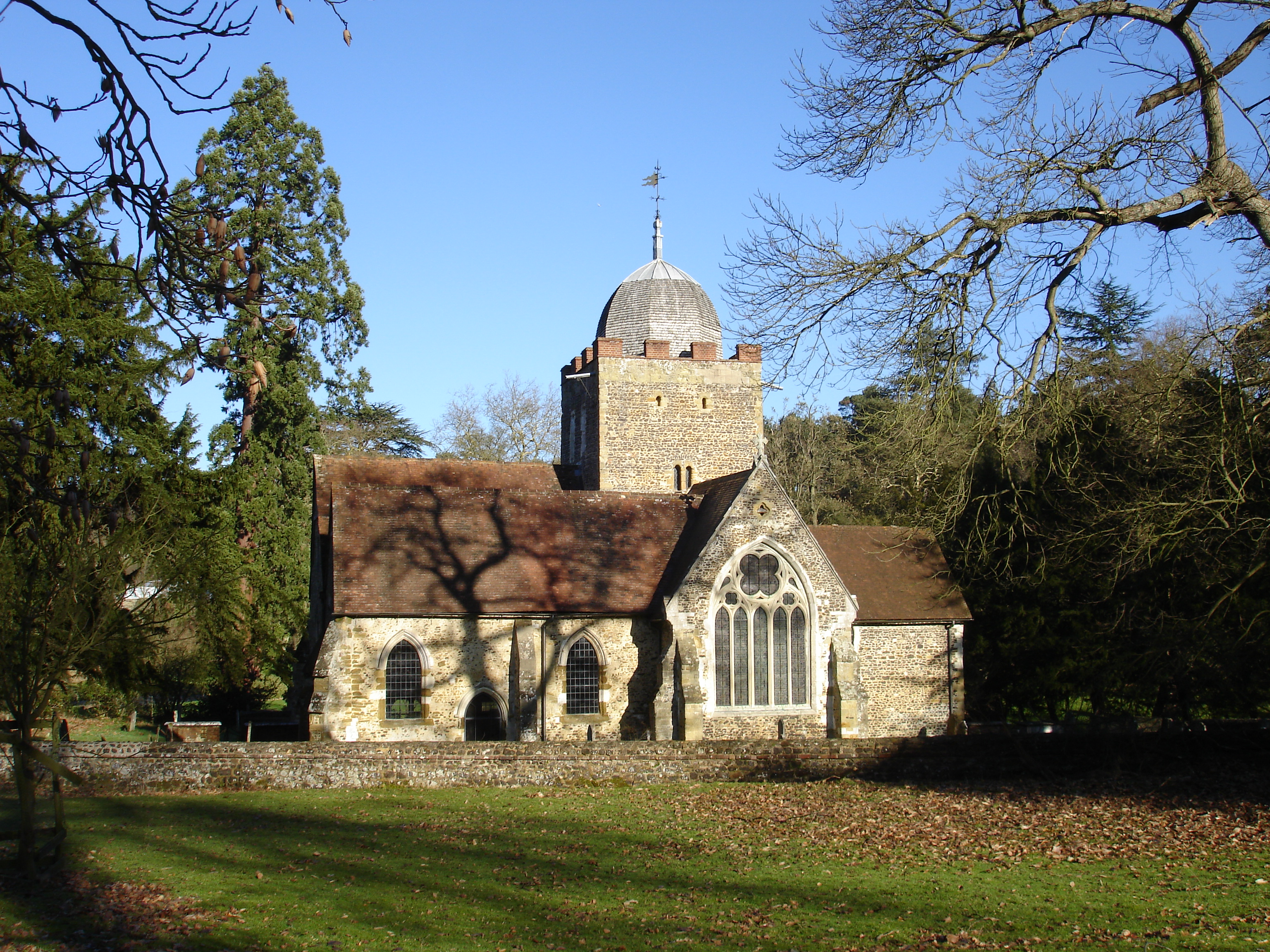
St Peter and St Paul Church in Albury Estate

The Saxon Old St Peter and St Paul's Church, within the grounds of Albury Park, predates 1066. Albury Park was mentioned in the Domesday Book of 1086. Over the centuries the estate has changed hands many times.

The grounds of Albury Park were laid out by John Evelyn, the 17th-century diarist and landscape gardener, between 1655 and 1677. He lived nearby at Wotton. At this time the park was owned by Henry Howard who later became the 6th Duke of Norfolk. John Evelyn's work included a yew walk, a vineyard, a terrace a quarter of a mile long, and a 160-yard tunnel, through the hill under Silver Wood. Beneath the terrace was a chamber built in imitation of a Roman bath, with niches for sculpture. He also designed a wide canal fed by the River Tillingbourne; it was drained in the early nineteenth century. Many of Evelyn's alterations to the mansion were destroyed in a fire in 1697. At that time the owner was Heneage Finch who later became the first Earl of Aylesford and Solicitor-General to Charles II. Finch rebuilt the mansion.

In 1761, Albury Park was the scene of the coronation banquet of George III.

The house was owned by the immediate Finch family until 1782 when the 4th Earl of Aylesford sold the estate to his brother Captain William Clement Finch, a naval captain who had acquired a fortune by capturing a Spanish ship. Captain Finch wanted to enclose the park, so he obtained magistrates' orders in 1784/5 to close or reroute each of several roads that had theretofore run through it. He enclosed the village green, incorporated part of the churchyard into the park grounds and harassed the villagers, causing some of them to move away to a nearby hamlet which is now the village of Albury.

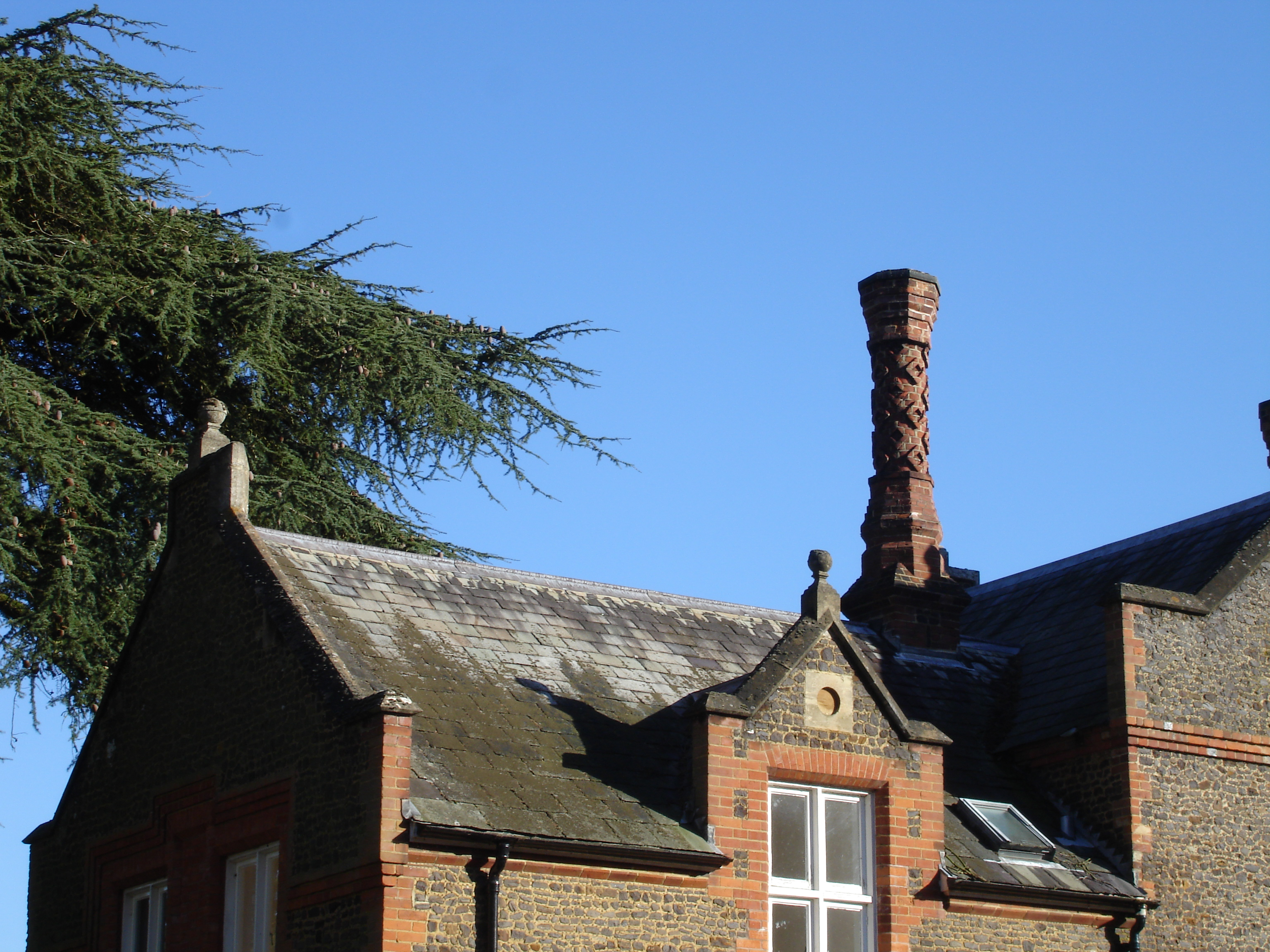
One of the initial 63 different chimneys

In 1800, Captain Finch's widow sold the estate to Samuel Thornton, who made additions to the house, including the north front, to the designs of John Soane. Albury Park was purchased by Barings Bank partner, Charles Wall in 1811 and he lived at this estate with his wife Harriet (born Baring) and at their homes in London and Hampshire. Harriet organised evangelical meetings at the house which were scheduled for twice a day. The services attracted sizable congregations to hear the prayers and the readings from scripture. All of these were organised by Harriet and at some she would lead the service. Charles Wall died in 1815 and after that Harriet's focus moved to her new residence in Hampshire.

The banker and politician Henry Drummond (1786–1860), great-grandson of William Drummond, 4th Viscount Strathallan, was the owner in 1819. Drummond added a battlemented stone Gothick tower at the north-west corner of the building, and 63 brick chimneys – each to a different design. His architect was Augustus Pugin. Drummond also planted many of the rare trees in the park.

=== Post-1890 ===
Albury Park passed into the Percy family through the marriage of Louisa Drummond, daughter of Henry Drummond, to the 6th Duke of Northumberland. The Duke of Northumberland still owns most of the land, known as the Albury Estate. The mansion contains 64 different mantelpieces, which were in part the work of Robert Adam. The private areas of the park contain a Roman bath and a cave inspired by the Grotto of Posilippo in Naples.

In 1969, the mansion together with 3 acres (12,000 m^{2}) of land, mostly laid to grass, was sold. The building was converted into private flats that were owned by the Country Houses Association until it went into liquidation in 2003. The house was then sold to private owners, who continued to let the flats, while living in the house themselves. The parkland and the John Evelyn gardens remained private.

Fly fishing is possible at Albury Park as part of the Albury Estate Fisheries fly fishing club. Park membership is based on a syndicate membership.

There is a public footpath through the estate.

The storms of 1987 and 1990 caused serious damage to parts of the park.

Albury Park was featured in a Channel 4 television series, Country House Rescue in December 2008, and November 2009. The house and grounds have also been the location of the filming of the television series Midsomer Murders and the romantic comedy film Four Weddings and a Funeral.

In March 2020, Country Life reported that the Grade II* listed mansion had been split into luxury apartments.
