= Harriet Wall =

British religious controversialist

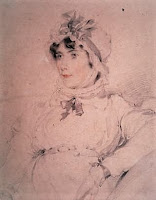
- Born: Harriet Baring; 13 September 1768; London
- Died: 5 March 1838 (aged 69)
- Occupation: Private means
- Known for: Evangelism
- Spouse: Charles Wall
- Children: Charles Baring Wall

Harriet Wall (née Baring; 13 September 1768 – 5 March 1838) was a British religious controversialist from a privileged background. She led a schism from the Church of England.

== Life ==
Wall was born in the parish of St Gabriel Fenchurch, London, on 13 September 1768. She was the first of eight children of Harriet (born Herring) and Sir Francis Baring (1740–1810). Her mother was the cousin and heir to Thomas Herring, Archbishop of Canterbury 1747–1757, and her father had started the influential Baring's Bank and he was the chair of the East India Company.

In 1790 she married her father's business partner, Charles Wall, at Beddington in Surrey on 1 November. In 1795 their only child, Charles Baring Wall, was born. He would use his family's influence to become a member of Parliament.

Albury Park was purchased by Charles Wall in 1811 and they lived at this estate and at their homes in London and Hampshire. Harriet organised evangelical meetings at the house which were scheduled for twice a day. The services attracted sizable congregations to hear the prayers and the readings from scripture. All of these were organised by Harriet and at some she would lead the service. Charles Wall died in 1815 and after that Harriet's focus moved to her new residence in Hampshire. Here she again organised meetings about religion and these attracted a good number of people including some of her family members. Within the year they had created a collective secession from the Church of England. This was said to be first since the Nonjuring schism of the early 1700s.

The schism was led by her and her brothers and the members included the Revd James Harington Evans, Thomas Snow, the MP Thomas Mead Kemp, and the Revd George Bevan. The group attracted a lot of attention as it was a split from the nation's religion. By 1819, however, enthusiasm had waned and it no longer seemed to an attack on the establishment. Albury Park was also sold in 1819 to the Irvingite Henry Drummond.
