= Joseph Paice =

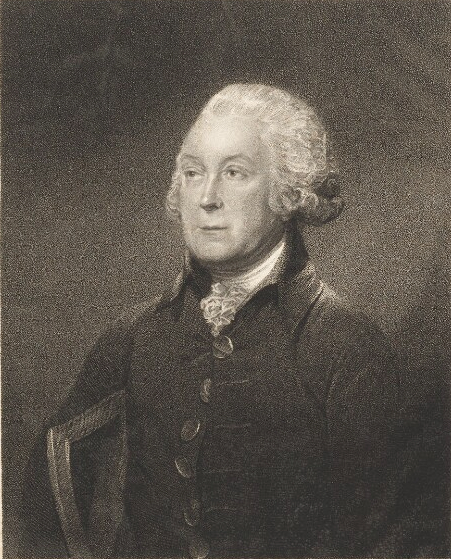
- Portrait of Joseph Paice, after Lemuel Francis Abbott
- Born: 1728
- Died: 1810 (aged 81–82)
- Occupation: merchant

Joseph Paice (1728–1810) was an English merchant, known for his charitable works.

== Early life ==
His father was Nathaniel Paice (died c.1768), and his mother Mary, who died when he was young, a sister of Thomas Edwards. He was the grandson of Joseph Paice (c.1658-1735), Member of Parliament for Lyme Regis, and on good terms with Sir Francis Baring, 1st Baronet.

== Benefactor ==
His prospective support for the Mission House at Stockbridge, Massachusetts involved Paice in transatlantic correspondence in the 1750s. He heard from Jonathan Edwards in 1752; and Elisha Williams had Joseph Dwight deliver to William Pepperrell a letter the following year, prompting Pepperrell to wrote to Paice and give the other side of Dwight's clash with Edwards.

From the late 1770s, Paice began to support the orphaned Gibson family; their mother Mary Rodbard, who had married the Cheapside merchant Frederick Gibson, was a granddaughter of Joseph Paice MP through his daughter Anne. On 6 July 1786 he had dinner with John Adams, at the Clapham house of William Smith. Adams recorded a joke he told, about a natural philosopher and a Scotsman.

Paice gave Charles Lamb a position in his counting-house. It occurred through a request from Thomas Coventry, thought to have been prompted by Samuel Salt. Coventry then secured Lamb a clerkship at the South Sea House. Paice introduced Lamb to Francis Baring, who in 1798 found him a place at East India House.

== Later life ==
Around 1795 Paice retired from business. In later life he lived with Frederick Gibson and his family in Bread Street Hill; then moved out to St Mary Newington. He was in the Paragon Building there on the New Kent Road in 1800, when he was made an executor and beneficiary in the will of Mary Wilkes, daughter of John Wilkes. He had been with John Nichols in the very small group of personal friends who attended the funeral of Wilkes in January 1798. He finally lived in the Rodney Buildings in St Mary Newington.

Paice was unmarried; Lamb in his essay "Modern Gallantry" states that he had courted Susan Winstanley of Clapton, who died young. A sermon for his death in 1810 was preached by Thomas Tayler of the Carter Lane chapel, where Paice had been one of the congregation. Paice's heir was his ward Frederick Gibson, who became principal customs surveyor of London Docks.

== Lucas legacy ==
Paice was involved in the estate of the merchant Thomas Lucas, who died in 1784. The residuary heir was Thomas Lucas Wheeler. Lucas was a sugar factor in London, owning English property and a slave-run plantation in St Kitts. The plantation, subject to annuities, was left in trust, Paice being one of the trustees. Wheeler then died in 1792. Under his will and codicil, the English property passed to Paice, and also the plantation, of which Paice gave a half-share to John Beach, another of the trustees, who died in 1796. There were further legal moves from 1789, including leasing Lee Manor House which had belonged to Lucas to John Call, and making Paice residual legatee of Eliza, widow of Lucas, who by then was married to John Julius Angerstein; she died in 1800.

== Gibson connections ==
Thomas Lucas Wheeler and Paice's heir Frederick Gibson married sisters, daughters of Edward Whatmore of Marshwood House, Wiltshire. Gibson's daughter Joan Whatmore Gibson married William Oke Manning (1778–1859) and was mother of the novelist Anne Manning. Frederick's sister Mary married Thomas Malleson (died 1820), ran a school in Chelsea, and was mother of the Unitarian minister John Philip Malleson (1796–1869).

Anne Manning came into possession of original correspondence of Paice, and published some details in the 1840s. He sold some of the enslaved people from his plantations, through Nathaniel Stewart of Tobago, asking that lower prices be accepted so that they might go to more humane owners. Thomas Lucas Wheeler's widow Betty married again, in 1793; but Paice was concerned to make the property Wheeler had left her freehold.

== Nathaniel Mason ==
His uncle Thomas Edwards wrote a sonnet, encouraging Paice to marry. In 1757, Edwards died, and Pitzhanger Manor came to Paice and another nephew, Nathaniel Mason. They sold it to the lawyer King Gould.

Anne Manning also wrote that Paice was disappointed in love, by a Miss Hunt of Ewell; she married his cousin Nathaniel Mason, Paice having decided not to press his suit. In the aftermath Paice supported Mason financially, but Mason failed and eventually left the country.

The background is that Miss Hunt was Ann or Annie Hunt, daughter of Thomas Hunt of Ewell. Christie's sold a portrait of Mrs. Nathaniel Mason (née Annie Hunt) in 1933, attributed to Thomas Gainsborough. Her brother Thomas Hunt the younger of Ewell (died 1784) matriculated at Worcester College, Oxford in 1737; their father was Thomas Hunt of Stourbridge. The elder Thomas Hunt was High Sheriff of Worcestershire in 1725.

Nathaniel Mason, a London merchant, married Ann Hunt in 1759. He later dealt in land in the Bedfordshire parishes of Odell and Sharnbrook. He bought further land for enclosure in Irchester parish, and in other counties. He also acquired estates in the West Indies. He died in 1782, in Billericay.
