= Baring baronets =

There have been two baronetcies created for members of the Baring family, one in the Baronetage of Great Britain and one in the Baronetage of the United Kingdom.

- Baring baronets of Larkbeer (1793)
- Baring baronets of Nubia House (1911)

== Family tree ==
Baring family tree

Johann (John) Baring (1697–1748)
John Baring (1730–1816)	Sir Francis Baring, 1st Baronet (1740–1810)	Charles Baring (1742–1829)
Sir Thomas Baring, 2nd Baronet (1772–1848)	Alexander Baring, 1st Baron Ashburton (1774–1848)	Henry Baring (1777–1848)	William Baring (1779–1820)	William Baring-Gould (1770–1846)
Francis Baring, 1st Baron Northbrook (1796–1866)	Thomas Baring (1799–1873)	Charles Baring (1807–1879)	Bingham Baring, 2nd Baron Ashburton (1799–1864)	Francis Baring, 3rd Baron Ashburton (1800–1868)	Henry Bingham Baring (1804–1869)	Edward Baring, 1st Baron Revelstoke (1828–1897)	Tom Baring (1839–1923)	Evelyn Baring, 1st Earl of Cromer (1841–1917)	William Baring (1819–1906)	Edward Baring-Gould (1804–1872)
Thomas Baring, 1st Earl of Northbrook (1826–1904)	Francis Baring (1850–1915)	T. C. Baring (1831–1891)	Alexander Baring, 4th Baron Ashburton (1835–1889)	Charles Baring (1829–1890)	John Baring, 2nd Baron Revelstoke (1863–1929)	Cecil Baring, 3rd Baron Revelstoke (1864–1934)	Everard Baring (1865–1932)	Maurice Baring (1874–1945)	Rowland Baring, 2nd Earl of Cromer (1877–1953)	Evelyn Baring, 1st Baron Howick of Glendale (1903–1973)	Rosa Baring (1854–1927)	Sabine Baring-Gould (1834–1924)
Francis Baring, 2nd Earl of Northbrook (1850–1929)	Francis Baring, 4th Baron Northbrook (1882–1947)	Francis Baring, 5th Baron Ashburton (1866–1938)	Guy Baring (1873–1916)	Sir Godfrey Baring, 1st Baronet (1871–1957)	Rupert Baring, 4th Baron Revelstoke (1911–1994)	Rowland Baring, 3rd Earl of Cromer (1918–1991)	Charles Baring, 2nd Baron Howick of Glendale (born 1937)	William Baring-Gould (1878–1921)
Earldom extinct
Francis Baring, 5th Baron Northbrook (1915–1990)	Alexander Baring, 6th Baron Ashburton (1898–1991)	Giles Baring (1910–1986)	Sir Charles Baring, 2nd Baronet (1898–1990)	Helen Azalea Baring (1901–1980)	Raymond Baring (1912–1967)	John Baring, 5th Baron Revelstoke (1934–2003)	James Baring, 6th Baron Revelstoke (1938–2012)	Evelyn Baring, 4th Earl of Cromer (born 1946)	William S. Baring-Gould (1913–1967)
Francis Baring, 6th Baron Northbrook (born 1954)	John Baring, 7th Baron Ashburton (1928–2020)	Sir John Baring, 3rd Baronet (born 1947)	Alexander Baring, 7th Baron Revelstoke (born 1970)
Mark Baring, 8th Baron Ashburton (born 1958)
