= East Stratton =

Village and parish in Hampshire, England

Coordinates: 51.1572°N 1.2267°W

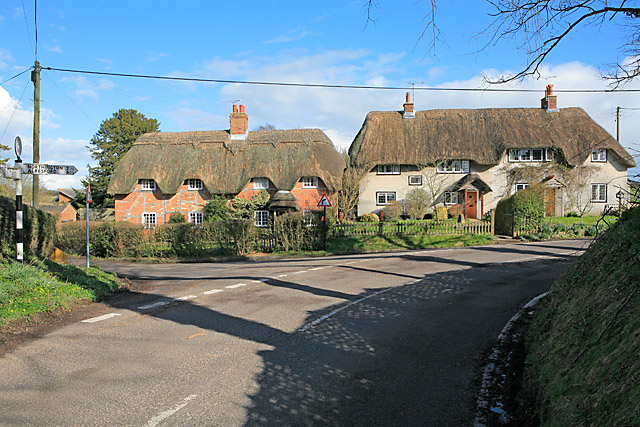
- Thatched houses in East Stratton

- Location within Hampshire
- Population: 200
- OS grid reference: SU541400
- Civil parish: Micheldever
- District: City of Winchester
- Shire county: Hampshire
- Region: South East
- Country: England
- Sovereign state: United Kingdom
- Post town: WINCHESTER
- Postcode district: SO21
- Dialling code: 01962
- Police: Hampshire and Isle of Wight
- Fire: Hampshire and Isle of Wight
- Ambulance: South Central
- UK Parliament: Winchester

East Stratton is an estate village and former civil parish, now in the parish of Micheldever, in the Winchester district, in the county of Hampshire, England. It is at the entrance to the landscaped grounds of Stratton Park, some 8 miles northeast of Winchester Both park and village demonstrate the evolution of a landscape directed by three eminent families – Wriothesley, Russell and Baring – during the 17th, 18th and 19th centuries. In 1931 the parish had a population of 230.

In East Stratton can clearly be seen a sequence of village development stretching over four centuries. At the north end, thatched cottages dating from the 17th and 18th centuries border the lane which sweeps down to the entrance of the park. Around the village crossroads and war memorial are grouped other cottages and the 'new' 19th-century church, All Saints, East Stratton and farm. Further south are five pairs of early 19th-century estate cottages and the 19th-century Plough Inn (now renamed the Northbrook Arms). A dozen houses erected in this century by the rural district council and Forestry Commission now extend the village as far as Cold Harbour, once a small separate hamlet.

The name Stratton comes from Old English and means farmstead or village on a Roman road.

== History ==
The Manor of East Stratton was granted to the New Minster (Hyde Abbey) about AD900 by King Edward the Elder and remained in the Abbey's hands until the Dissolution. In 1564 the manor was purchased for £1,318 by Sir Thomas Wriothesley, later Earl of Southampton (d.1550). The last earl, Thomas (d.1667), made "the house at Stratton Park one of his chief seats in the country." He was probably responsible for first enclosing the park.

In 1667, the manor passed to Thomas's daughter Lady Rachel and her husband William, Lord Russell who is said to have "pulled down part of the town or hamlet of Stratton and laid it into his Dear Park". Lord and Lady Russell improved the estate and house, laying out "orchards, gardens and avenues, planted groves, wildernesses and other ornaments to adorn and accommodate this beautiful and pleasant scene". Lord Russell was executed in 1683 for complicity in the Rye House Plot but Lady Russell continued to look after the estate until her death in 1723.

In 1723, the estate passed to Lady Russell's grandson Wriothesley Russell, 3rd Duke of Bedford. He is generally credited with the demolition of "a great part of the ancient mansion at Stratton Park lest it should cause the magnificent residence at Woburn Abbey to be neglected ..."

In 1801, Sir Francis Baring purchased the estate for £150,000 and the Baring family have owned the Stratton estate ever since. Sir Francis immediately started improving the estate. The old house was removed and remodelled in the classic style by George Dance Jnr who designed the 'new cottages'. The house briefly became The Vyne Stratton School in the 1920s.

Open fields around the village were closed in 1800–1850, the park was twice extended south and new cottages and the Plough Inn were erected at the south end of the village. East Stratton Farm lay in the middle of the new road to the New Farm. By the middle of the century much of the old village had been knocked down for improvements to the park.

Opposite where the old church had stood a new school was built, to replace the old one which had burnt down, by Sir Thomas Baring in 1846, he described it as 'a neat Elizabethan style' and it still stand in the park today. The school could accommodate 150 children but its average attendance was 60. It was closed in the 1960s

The old church which had been largely rebuilt in 1810 was demolished and a cross was built in its place. The new church, All Saints, was built in the village and was opened in 1888.

On 1 April 1932, the civil parish was abolished and merged with Micheldever.
