= John Baring (1730–1816) =

British merchant, banker and politician (1730–1816)

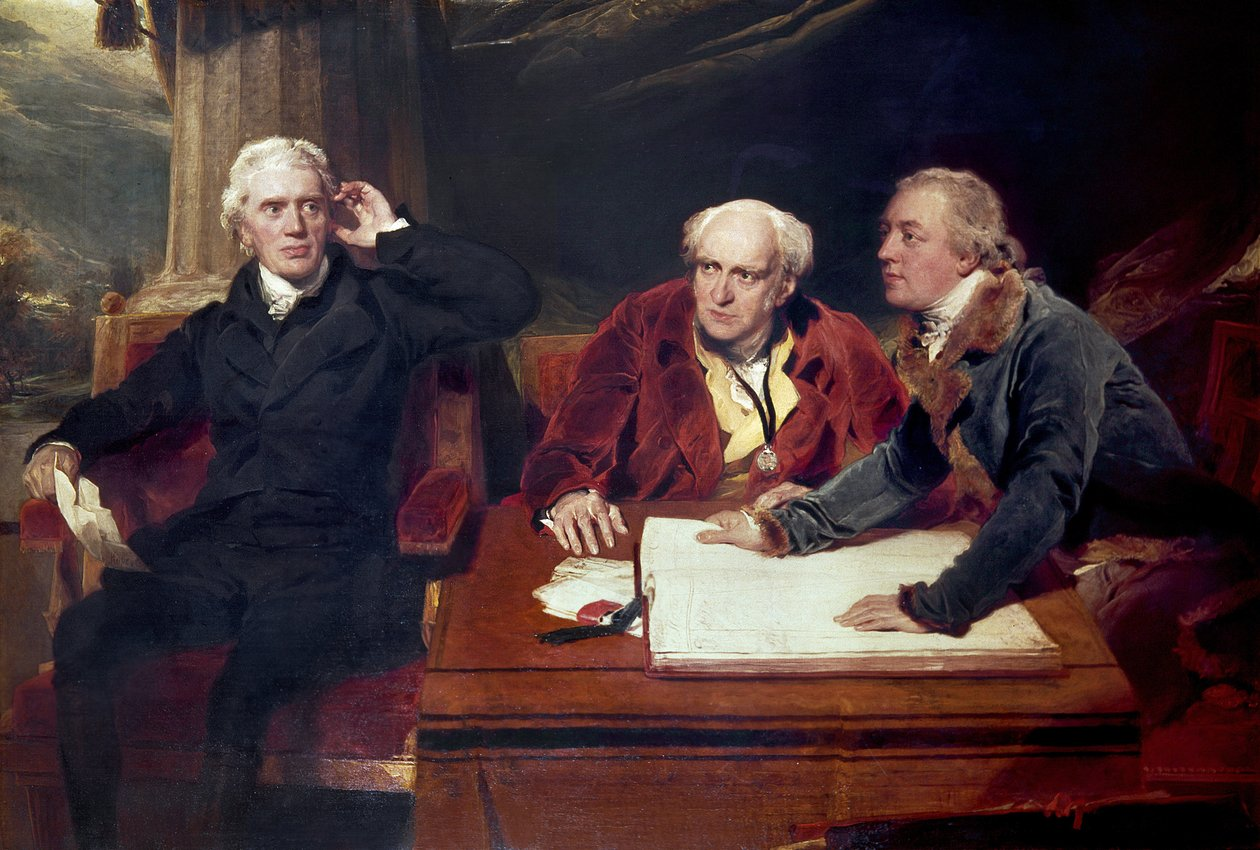
John Baring (centre) with his brother Sir Francis Baring, 1st Baronet (left), and Charles Wall (right). 1806–1807 painting by Sir Thomas Lawrence.

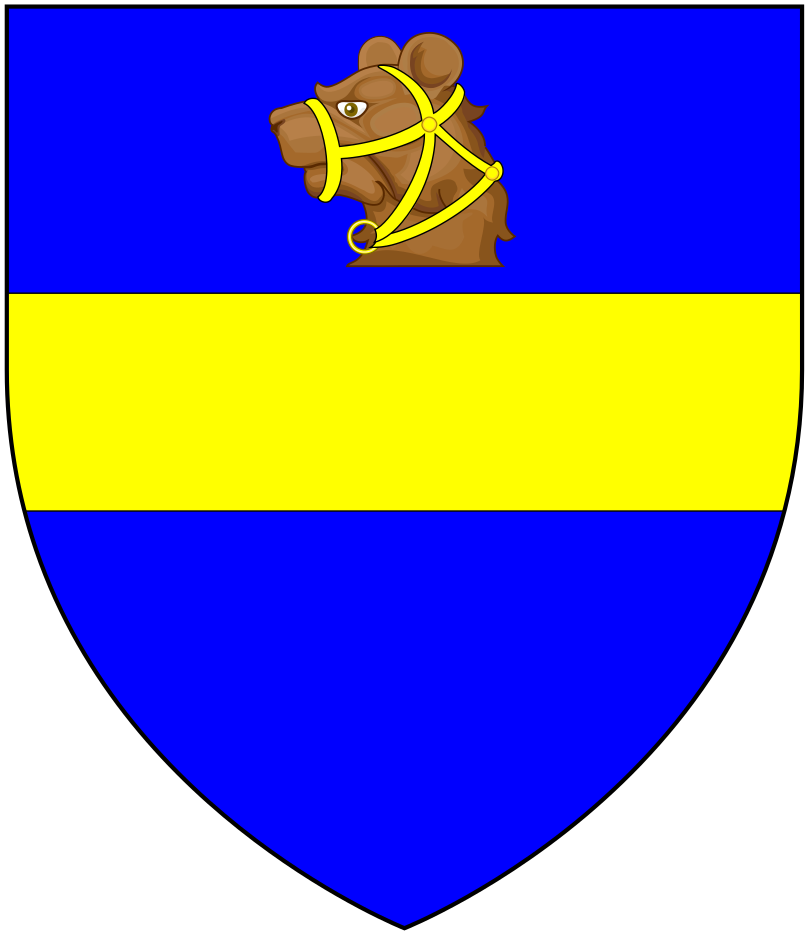
Canting arms of Baring: Azure, a fesse or in chief a bear's head proper muzzled and ringed of the second

John Baring (5 October 1730 – 29 January 1816) was a British merchant, banker and politician.

== Early life ==
He was the eldest son of Elizabeth Vowler and Johann Baring (1697–1748), a clothier from Bremen in Germany who had settled in Exeter, where he built up a large business and obtained English citizenship, having Anglicised his name to "John". The younger John was brought up at Larkbeare, his father's country residence just outside the city of Exeter, and was educated in Geneva. He had three younger brothers, Thomas, Francis and Charles, and a sister Elizabeth. Francis became his business partner and later, Sir Francis Baring, 1st Baronet.

== Career ==
After his father's death in 1748, he inherited the large family cloth business in Exeter. Together with his younger brother Francis, he extended his commercial interests to London by setting up the partnership of John and Francis Baring, of which he was the senior partner. He soon retired from activity in London to concentrate on business in Devon, and left the running of the London business to Francis, under whose guidance it evolved into Barings Bank.

Back in Devon, Baring founded banks in Plymouth and Exeter and entered politics. Having unsuccessfully contested Honiton, he was elected Member of Parliament for Exeter in 1776. Baring Crescent, Exeter, developed with Regency villas 1818–1828, was named after the family. He was also appointed Sheriff of Devon for 1776. He retired from Parliament in 1802.

== Personal life ==
Baring married Anne Parker (died 1765), the daughter of Francis Parker of Blagdon in the parish of Paignton in Devon, by whom he had two sons and four daughters, including:

- Charlotte Baring (1763–1833), who married John Jeffrey Short (b. 1753) in 1786. Short was the son of John Short Sr. of Bickham House, Kenn, who had been in 1744 a partner with John Baring and his brother Charles in the Baring's bank in Exeter. Charlotte's eldest son was John Short (1790–1818) who died unmarried and was succeeded at Bickham by his brother Francis Baring Short.

In 1755, Baring purchased for £2,100 the estate of Mount Radford in the parish of St Leonards, on the outskirts of Exeter, adjacent to his father's residence of Larkbeare. He also purchased the adjoining manors of Heavitree and Wonford. According to a contemporary report, by 1810 he also had a residence at West Teignmouth House in the parish of West Teignmouth. In the last year of his life he encountered financial difficulties and sold Mount Radford and his other Exeter properties to his cousin Sir Thomas Baring, 2nd Baronet (1772–1848), who later sold them to a commercial builder.

Parliament of Great Britain
Preceded by Sir Charles Bampfylde, 5th Bt; John Rolle Walter	Member of Parliament for Exeter; 1776–1800; With: Sir Charles Bampfylde, 5th Bt; James Buller	Succeeded by Parliament of Great Britain
Parliament of the United Kingdom
Preceded by Parliament of the United Kingdom	Member of Parliament for Exeter; 1801–1802; With: Sir Charles Bampfylde, 5th Bt	Succeeded by Sir Charles Bampfylde, 5th Bt; James Buller
