= Sir Thomas Baring, 2nd Baronet =

British banker (1772–1848)

Sir Thomas Baring, 2nd Baronet Bt
- portrait by George Engleheart

Member of Parliament for Hampshire
- In office 1832–1832 Serving with Charles Shaw-Lefevre
- Preceded by: Sir James Macdonald; Charles Shaw-Lefevre
- Succeeded by: Abolished

Member of Parliament for High Wycombe
- In office 1806–1832 Serving with Sir John Dashwood-King; Hon. Robert Smith
- Preceded by: Sir John Dashwood-King; Sir Francis Baring
- Succeeded by: Hon. Robert Smith; Hon. Charles Grey

Personal details
- Born: 12 June 1772
- Died: 3 April 1848 (aged 75) Stratton Park, East Stratton, Hampshire, England
- Spouse: Mary Ursula Sealy (m. 1794; died 1846)
- Relations: Johann Baring (grandfather)
- Parent(s): Sir Francis Baring, 1st Baronet; Harriet Herring Baring

Sir Thomas Baring, 2nd Baronet (12 June 1772 – 3 April 1848), was a British banker and member of parliament.

== Early life ==
Baring was born on 12 June 1772. A member of the Baring family, he was the eldest son of Harriet (née Herring) Baring and Sir Francis Baring, 1st Baronet, founder of Barings Bank.

His grandfather, John (Johann) Baring, had emigrated from Germany and established the family in England. His maternal grandfather was merchant William Herring of Croydon and among his mother's family was her cousin, Thomas Herring, Archbishop of Canterbury.

== Career ==
From 1790 and 1801, he worked with the Honourable East India Company. Thomas became a partner in Baring Brothers & Co. in 1804, remaining until 1809. Upon his father's death in, 1810, he succeeded Sir Francis Baring, 1st Baronet.

After his early career with the bank, Sir Thomas was elected a British member of parliament for the constituencies of High Wycombe and Hampshire until 1831.

From 1832 to 1833 he was the chairman of the London and South Western Railway. He was president of the London Institution and Director of the British Institution. In June 1841, he was elected a Fellow of the Royal Society.

== Personal life ==
On 3 September 1794, he married Mary Ursula Sealy (1774–1846) in Calcutta, India. Mary was the daughter of Charles Sealy. Together, they were the parents of four sons and five daughters, including:

- Francis Baring (1796–1866), who married Jane Grey, fifth daughter of Hon. Sir George Grey, 1st Baronet. After her death, he married Lady Arabella Howard, second daughter of Kenneth Howard, 1st Earl of Effingham.
- Thomas Baring (1799–1873), a banker and MP for Great Yarmouth and Huntingdon.
- John Baring (1801–1888), who married Charlotte Amelia Porcher, daughter of Reverend George Porcher.
- Mary Ursula Baring (c. 1803–1812), who died in childhood.
- Charlotte Baring (1805–1871), who married Reverend William Maxwell du Pré, brother of Caledon Du Pré, MP.
- Charles Baring (1807–1879), who became the Bishop of Durham.
- Lydia Dorothy Baring (c. 1811–1812), who died young.
- Frances Baring (1813–1850), who married Henry Labouchere, 1st Baron Taunton.

On 3 April 1848, aged 75, he died at his residence Stratton Park House, East Stratton, Hampshire. He was succeeded in the baronetcy by his eldest son who was later raised to the peerage in 1866 as Baron Northbrook.

Parliament of the United Kingdom
Preceded by Sir John Dashwood-King; Sir Francis Baring	Member of Parliament for High Wycombe; 1806–1832; With: Sir John Dashwood-King 1806–1831; Hon. Robert Smith 1831–1832	Succeeded by Hon. Robert Smith; Hon. Charles Grey
Preceded by Sir James Macdonald; Charles Shaw-Lefevre	Member of Parliament for Hampshire; 1832; With: Charles Shaw-Lefevre	Constituency abolished
Baronetage of Great Britain
Preceded by Francis Baring	Baronet (of Larkbeer, Devon); 1810–1848	Succeeded by Francis Baring
