= Stratton Park =

Country house in Hampshire, England

Coordinates: 51.156°N 1.225°W

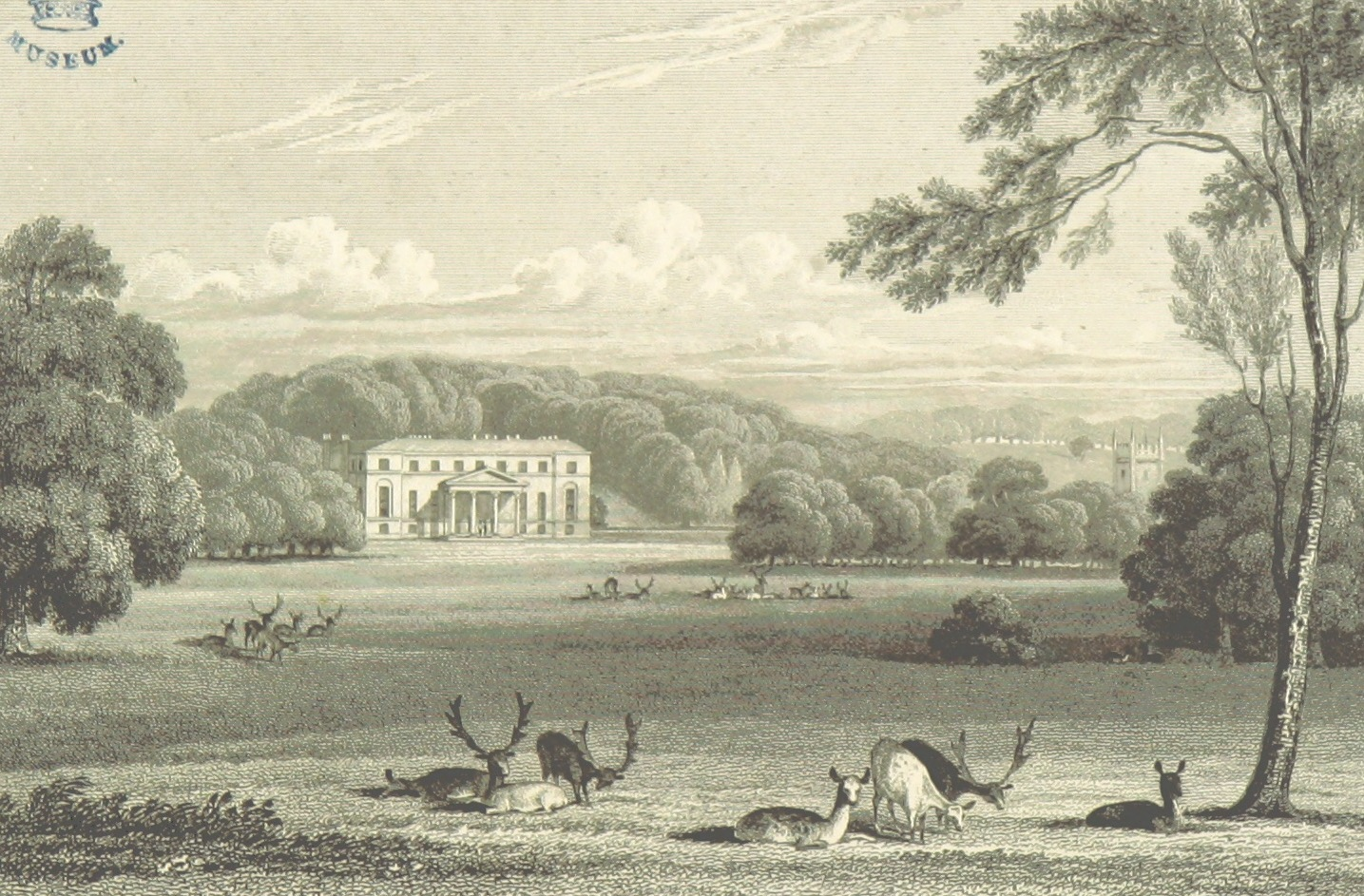
1818 illustration of Stratton Park

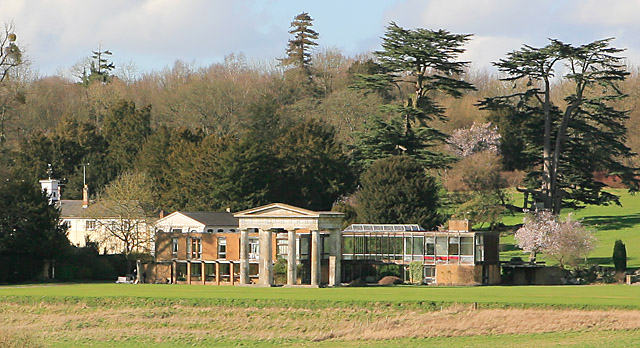
Stratton Park today

Stratton Park, in East Stratton, Hampshire, was an English country house, built on the site of a grange of Hyde Abbey after the dissolution of the monasteries; it was purchased with the manor of Micheldever in 1546 by Thomas Wriothesley, 1st Earl of Southampton. The last earl of Southampton made Stratton Park one of his chief seats, and his son-in-law, Sir William Russell, pulled down part of the hamlet and added it to his deer park in the 1660s. The Russell heirs eventually sold the estate in 1801 to Sir Francis Baring, Bt, of the Baring banking family. Baring remodeled the manor house in a neoclassical style, to designs by George Dance the Younger, 1803–06,' including an imposing stone Doric-columned portico and stuccoed brick main block and wings. The pleasure grounds and landscape park were laid out and planted, starting ca 1803 by Humphry Repton, and described by William Cobbett, in Rural Rides: in the counties of Surrey, Kent, Sussex, Hants, when Stratton Park held the living of Micheldever and included Micheldever Wood, which Cobbett said "contains a thousand acres [4 km^{2}], and which is one of the finest oak-woods in England." In the late nineteenth century Thomas Baring, 1st Earl of Northbrook laid out more formally structured gardens, with hardy plantings by Gertrude Jekyll. The park has been Grade II registered since 1984.

Most of the Stratton Park house was demolished in 1963 by owner John Baring, 7th Baron Ashburton, whose involvement in the demolition of the Baring family's architecturally important banking headquarters in London had earned him the nickname "Basher Baring". Today, all that remains is Dance's stone portico, looming up near, but in no stable relation with, a modernist house by Stephen Gardiner and Christopher Knight, 1963-65. The portico is now a listed structure since 1983. Mature specimen trees from the landscape park tower above the present structure.
