= Baron Howick of Glendale =

Barony in the Peerage of the United Kingdom

Baron Howick of Glendale, of Howick in the County of Northumberland, is a title in the Peerage of the United Kingdom. It was created in 1960 for Sir Evelyn Baring, the former Governor of Kenya. A member of the famous Baring family, he was the third and youngest son of Evelyn Baring, 1st Earl of Cromer, and the great-grandson of Sir Francis Baring, 1st Baronet, the founder of Barings Bank. Baring's uncle was Edward Baring, 1st Baron Revelstoke, the father of Maurice Baring, while other members of the family include Francis Baring, 1st Baron Northbrook, and Alexander Baring, 1st Baron Ashburton. As of 2014 the title is held by the first Baron's son, the second Baron, who succeeded in 1973.

The family seat is Howick Hall, near Howick, Northumberland.

== Barons Howick of Glendale (1960) ==
- Evelyn Baring, 1st Baron Howick of Glendale (1903–1973)
- Charles Evelyn Baring, 2nd Baron Howick of Glendale (b. 1937)

The heir apparent is the present holder's son Hon. David Evelyn Charles Baring (b. 1975)
The next heir-in-line is his elder son Felix Charles Alexander Baring (b. 2007)

== Family tree ==
Baring family tree

Johann (John) Baring (1697–1748)
John Baring (1730–1816) | Sir Francis Baring, 1st Baronet (1740–1810) | Charles Baring (1742–1829)
Sir Thomas Baring, 2nd Baronet (1772–1848) | Alexander Baring, 1st Baron Ashburton (1774–1848) | Henry Baring (1777–1848) | William Baring (1779–1820) | William Baring-Gould (1770–1846)
Francis Baring, 1st Baron Northbrook (1796–1866) | Thomas Baring (1799–1873) | Charles Baring (1807–1879) | Bingham Baring, 2nd Baron Ashburton (1799–1864) | Francis Baring, 3rd Baron Ashburton (1800–1868) | Henry Bingham Baring (1804–1869) | Edward Baring, 1st Baron Revelstoke (1828–1897) | Thomas Baring (1839–1923) | Evelyn Baring, 1st Earl of Cromer (1841–1917) | William Baring (1819–1906) | Edward Baring-Gould (1804–1872)
Thomas Baring, 1st Earl of Northbrook (1826–1904) | Francis Baring (1850–1915) | Thomas Charles Baring (1831–1891) | Alexander Baring, 4th Baron Ashburton (1835–1889) | Charles Baring (1829–1890) | John Baring, 2nd Baron Revelstoke (1863–1929) | Cecil Baring, 3rd Baron Revelstoke (1864–1934) | Everard Baring (1865–1932) | Maurice Baring (1874–1945) | Rowland Baring, 2nd Earl of Cromer (1877–1953) | Evelyn Baring, 1st Baron Howick of Glendale (1903–1973) | Rosa Baring (1854–1927) | Sabine Baring-Gould (1834–1924)
Francis Baring, 2nd Earl of Northbrook (1850–1929) | Francis Baring, 4th Baron Northbrook (1882–1947) | Francis Baring, 5th Baron Ashburton (1866–1938) | Guy Baring (1873–1916) | Sir Godfrey Baring, 1st Baronet (1871–1957) | Rupert Baring, 4th Baron Revelstoke (1911–1994) | Rowland Baring, 3rd Earl of Cromer (1918–1991) | Charles Baring, 2nd Baron Howick of Glendale (born 1937) | William Baring-Gould (1878–1921)
Francis Baring, 5th Baron Northbrook (1915–1990) | Alexander Baring, 6th Baron Ashburton (1898–1991) | Giles Baring (1910–1986) | Sir Charles Baring, 2nd Baronet (1898–1990) | Helen Azalea Baring (1901–1980) | Raymond Baring (1912–1967) | John Baring, 5th Baron Revelstoke (1934–2003) | James Baring, 6th Baron Revelstoke (1938–2012) | Evelyn Baring, 4th Earl of Cromer (born 1946) | William S. Baring-Gould (1913–1967)
Francis Baring, 6th Baron Northbrook (born 1954) | John Baring, 7th Baron Ashburton (1928–2020) | Sir John Baring, 3rd Baronet (born 1947) | Alexander Baring, 7th Baron Revelstoke (born 1970)
Mark Baring, 8th Baron Ashburton (born 1958)

== See also ==
- Earl of Cromer
- Baron Ashburton (1835 creation)
- Baron Northbrook
- Baron Revelstoke
- Barings Bank
