= Baron Northbrook =

Barony in the Peerage of the United Kingdom

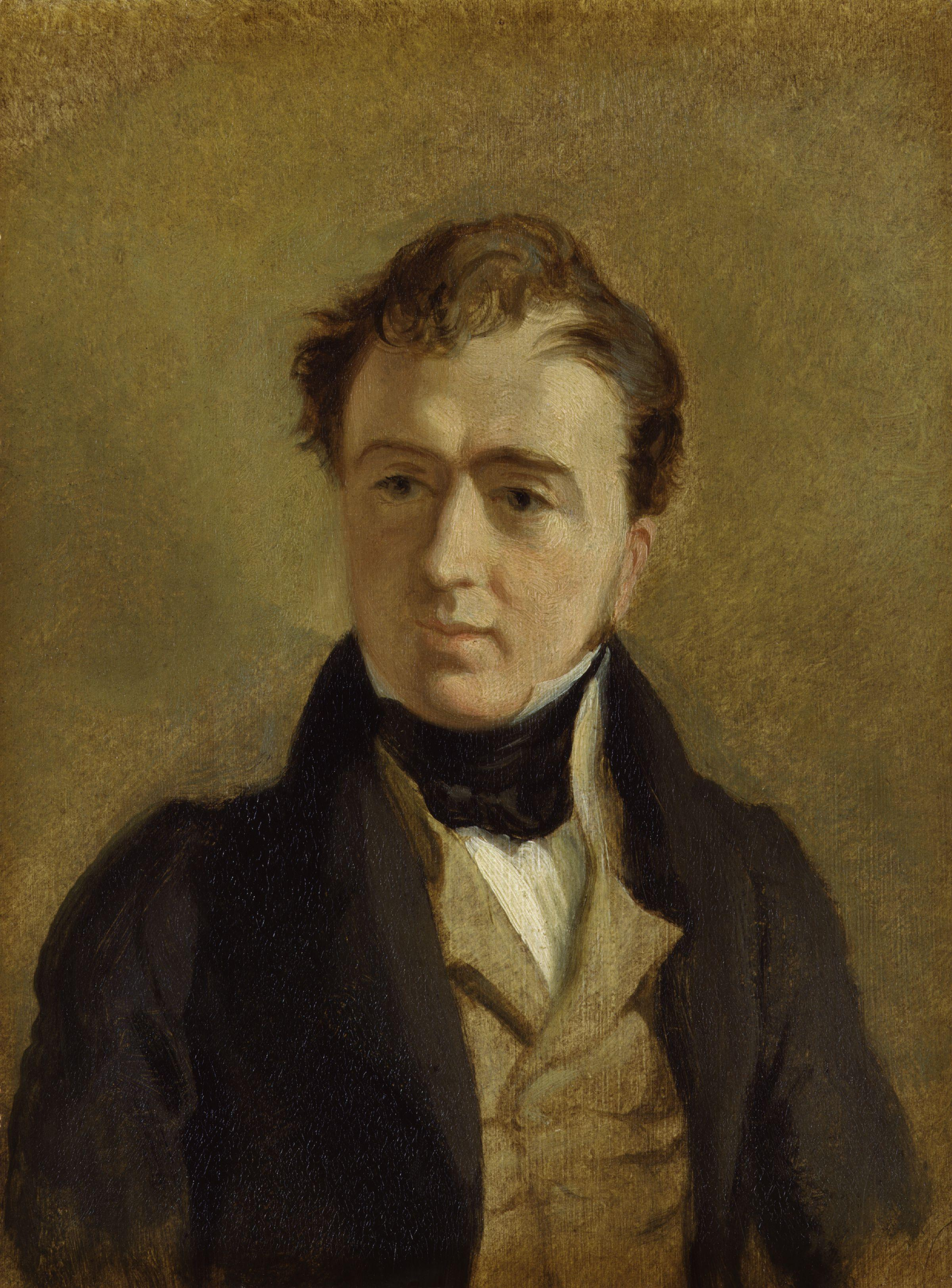
Francis Baring, 1st Baron Northbrook

Baron Northbrook, of Stratton in the County of Southampton, is a title in the Peerage of the United Kingdom. It was created in 1866 for the Liberal politician and former Chancellor of the Exchequer, Sir Francis Baring, 3rd Baronet. The holders of the barony represent the genealogically senior branch of the prominent Baring family. The name Northbrook is derived from a tithing of the local parish.

== History ==
The holders of the barony descend from Francis Baring, whose father had emigrated to Great Britain from Germany. Francis was the founder of the family firm that grew into Barings Bank. The firm increased in wealth and influence to the point that, on 29 May 1793, Francis was created a baronet, of Larkbeer in the County of Devon, in the Baronetage of Great Britain. His eldest son Thomas became the second Baronet, also representing Chipping Wycombe and Hampshire in the House of Commons. Sir Thomas was succeeded by his eldest son Francis, third Baronet. Sir Francis held office as Chancellor of the Exchequer and First Lord of the Admiralty. In 1866 he was raised to the Peerage of the United Kingdom as Baron Northbrook, of Stratton in the County of Southampton.

Lord Northbrook's eldest son Thomas, the second Baron, was Viceroy of India from 1872 to 1876. In that year he was created Viscount Baring, of Lee in the County of Kent, and Earl of Northbrook, in the County of Southampton. Both titles were in the Peerage of the United Kingdom. On his death, the titles passed to his eldest son Francis George, second Earl. He sat as a Member of Parliament for Winchester and Biggleswade. The second Earl was childless, and on his death in 1929, the viscountcy and earldom became extinct. He was succeeded in the baronetcy and barony by his first cousin Francis Arthur, who became the fourth Baron Northbrook. Francis Arthur was the son of the Hon. Francis Baring (1850–1915), third son of the first Baron and a partner in Barings Bank.

As of 2017 the titles are held by the fourth Baron's grandson, the sixth Baron, who succeeded his father in 1990. Lord Northbrook is one of the ninety elected hereditary peers who remain in the House of Lords after the passing of the House of Lords Act 1999, and sits on the Conservative benches.

The Baring family is one of the most ennobled in the United Kingdom and numerous other members of the family have gained distinction. The first Baron Northbrook's uncle (his father's next youngest brother) was Alexander Baring, 1st Baron Ashburton, two of his first cousins (both sons of Henry Baring, his father's next youngest brother after Lord Ashburton) were Edward Baring, 1st Baron Revelstoke, and Evelyn Baring, 1st Earl of Cromer, and one of his first cousins once removed (third son of Lord Cromer) was Evelyn Baring, 1st Baron Howick of Glendale. Also, the Right Reverend Charles Baring, Bishop of Durham, was his younger brother. The Bishop's son Thomas was a banker and Conservative politician.

== Titleholders ==
=== Baring baronets, of Larkbeer (1793) ===
- Sir Francis Baring, 1st Baronet (1740–1810)
- Sir Thomas Baring, 2nd Baronet (1772–1848)
- Sir Francis Thornhill Baring, 3rd Baronet (1796–1866) (created Baron Northbrook in 1866)

=== Barons Northbrook (1866) ===
- Francis Thornhill Baring, 1st Baron Northbrook (1796–1866)
- Thomas George Baring, 2nd Baron Northbrook (1826–1904) (created Earl of Northbrook in 1876)

=== Earls of Northbrook (1876) ===
- Thomas George Baring, 1st Earl of Northbrook (1826–1904)
- Francis George Baring, 2nd Earl of Northbrook (1850–1929)

=== Barons Northbrook (1866; reverted) ===
- Francis Arthur Baring, 4th Baron Northbrook (1882–1947)
- Francis John Baring, 5th Baron Northbrook (1915–1990)
- Francis Thomas Baring, 6th Baron Northbrook (born 1954)

There is no heir to the barony.
The heir presumptive to the baronetcy is the present holder's fourth cousin, Peter Baring (born 1939). He is a great-great-grandson of the Right Reverend Charles Baring, younger son of the second Baronet.
The heir presumptive's heir apparent is his son, Samuel Nigel Baring (born 1987).

== Title succession chart ==
Title succession chart, Baring baronets, Barons Northbrook, and Earls of Northbrook.

Sir Francis Baring; 1st Baronet; 1740–1810
Sir Thomas Baring; 2nd Baronet; 1772–1848
Baron Northbrook
Francis Baring; 1st Baron Northbrook; 3rd Baronet; 1796–1866	Thomas Baring; 1799–1873	John Baring; 1802–1888	Rt Rev. Charles Baring; 1807–1879
Viscount Baring; Earl of Northbrook
Thomas Baring; 1st Earl of Northbrook; 2nd Baron Northbrook; 1826–1904	unknown son	Hon. Francis Baring; 1850–1915	T. C. Baring; 1831–1891
Francis Baring; 2nd Earl of Northbrook; 3rd Baron Northbrook; 1850–1929	Hon. Arthur Baring; 1854–1870	Francis Baring; 4th Baron Northbrook; 6th Baronet; 1882–1947	Capt. John Baring; 1885–1956	Rupert Baring; 1891–1894	Charles Baring; 1860–1866	Robert Baring; 1863–1866	Harold Baring; 1869–1927	Godfrey Baring; 1870–1934
Viscountcy and earldom extinct
Francis Baring; 5th Baron Northbrook; 7th Baronet; 1915–1990	Desmond Baring; 1914–1991
Francis Baring; 6th Baron Northbrook; 8th Baronet born 1954	Peter Baring born 1939
Samuel Baring born 1987

Wider family tree

Baring family tree

Johann (John) Baring (1697–1748)
John Baring (1730–1816)	Sir Francis Baring, 1st Baronet (1740–1810)	Charles Baring (1742–1829)
Sir Thomas Baring, 2nd Baronet (1772–1848)	Alexander Baring, 1st Baron Ashburton (1774–1848)	Henry Baring (1777–1848)	William Baring (1779–1820)	William Baring-Gould (1770–1846)
Francis Baring, 1st Baron Northbrook (1796–1866)	Thomas Baring (1799–1873)	Charles Baring (1807–1879)	Bingham Baring, 2nd Baron Ashburton (1799–1864)	Francis Baring, 3rd Baron Ashburton (1800–1868)	Henry Bingham Baring (1804–1869)	Edward Baring, 1st Baron Revelstoke (1828–1897)	Tom Baring (1839–1923)	Evelyn Baring, 1st Earl of Cromer (1841–1917)	William Baring (1819–1906)	Edward Baring-Gould (1804–1872)
Thomas Baring, 1st Earl of Northbrook (1826–1904)	Francis Baring (1850–1915)	T. C. Baring (1831–1891)	Alexander Baring, 4th Baron Ashburton (1835–1889)	Charles Baring (1829–1890)	John Baring, 2nd Baron Revelstoke (1863–1929)	Cecil Baring, 3rd Baron Revelstoke (1864–1934)	Everard Baring (1865–1932)	Maurice Baring (1874–1945)	Rowland Baring, 2nd Earl of Cromer (1877–1953)	Evelyn Baring, 1st Baron Howick of Glendale (1903–1973)	Rosa Baring (1854–1927)	Sabine Baring-Gould (1834–1924)
Francis Baring, 2nd Earl of Northbrook (1850–1929)	Francis Baring, 4th Baron Northbrook (1882–1947)	Francis Baring, 5th Baron Ashburton (1866–1938)	Guy Baring (1873–1916)	Sir Godfrey Baring, 1st Baronet (1871–1957)	Rupert Baring, 4th Baron Revelstoke (1911–1994)	Rowland Baring, 3rd Earl of Cromer (1918–1991)	Charles Baring, 2nd Baron Howick of Glendale (born 1937)	William Baring-Gould (1878–1921)
Earldom extinct
Francis Baring, 5th Baron Northbrook (1915–1990)	Alexander Baring, 6th Baron Ashburton (1898–1991)	Giles Baring (1910–1986)	Sir Charles Baring, 2nd Baronet (1898–1990)	Helen Azalea Baring (1901–1980)	Raymond Baring (1912–1967)	John Baring, 5th Baron Revelstoke (1934–2003)	James Baring, 6th Baron Revelstoke (1938–2012)	Evelyn Baring, 4th Earl of Cromer (born 1946)	William S. Baring-Gould (1913–1967)
Francis Baring, 6th Baron Northbrook (born 1954)	John Baring, 7th Baron Ashburton (1928–2020)	Sir John Baring, 3rd Baronet (born 1947)	Alexander Baring, 7th Baron Revelstoke (born 1970)
Mark Baring, 8th Baron Ashburton (born 1958)

== See also ==
- Northbrook Hall
- Baron Ashburton
- Earl of Cromer
- Baron Revelstoke
- Baron Howick of Glendale
