= Earl of Cromer =

Noble title in the United Kingdom

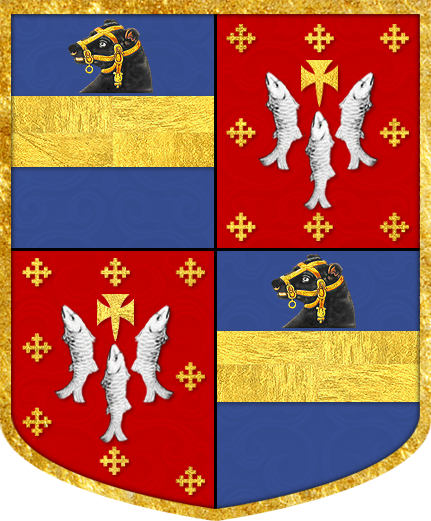
- Blazon Arms: Quarterly: 1st & 4th, Azure, a Fess Or, in chief a Bear’s Head proper, muzzled and ringed Gold (Baring); 2nd & 3rd, Gules, a Cross-Pattée fitchée Or, between three fish haurient Argent, within an orle of eight Cross-Crosslets Or. Crest: A Mullet Erminois, between two wings Argent. Supporters: Dexter: a Bear proper, muzzled Gold, gorged with a Collar chequy Argent and Azure, Sinister: a Bear proper, muzzled Gold, gorged with a Collar gemel Azure, both and charged on the shoulder with an Escallop Or.
- Creation date: 8 August 1901
- Created by: King Edward VII
- Peerage: United Kingdom
- First holder: Evelyn Baring, 1st Earl of Cromer
- Present holder: Evelyn Baring, 4th Earl of Cromer
- Heir apparent: Alexander Baring, Viscount Errington
- Remainder to: the 1st Earl's heirs male of the body
- Subsidiary titles: Viscount Cromer; Viscount Errington; Baron Cromer
- Status: Extant
- Motto: PROBITATE ET LABORE (By probity and industry)

Earl of Cromer is a title in the Peerage of the United Kingdom, held by members of the British branch of the Anglo-German Baring banking family.

It was created in 1901 for Evelyn Baring, 1st Viscount Cromer, long time British Consul-General in Egypt. He had already been created Baron Cromer, of Cromer in the County of Norfolk, in 1892 and Viscount Cromer in 1899. At the time of his elevation to an Earl on 8 August 1901, he was also awarded the title Viscount Errington, of Hexham in Northumberland. These titles are also in the Peerage of the United Kingdom.

The first Lord Cromer was the son of Henry Baring, third son of Sir Francis Baring, 1st Baronet. He was succeeded by his son, the second Earl, a diplomat and civil servant. His son, the third Earl, was also a diplomat and served as British Ambassador to the United States between 1971 and 1974. In 2010 the titles are held by the latter's son, the fourth Earl, who succeeded in 1991.

Evelyn Baring, 1st Baron Howick of Glendale, was the third son of the first Earl.

The family seat is Drayton Court, near Drayton, Somerset.

== Baron Cromer (1892) ==
- Evelyn Baring, 1st Baron Cromer (1841–1917) (created Viscount Cromer in 1899)

=== Viscount Cromer (1899) ===
- Evelyn Baring, 1st Viscount Cromer (1841–1917) (created Earl of Cromer in 1901)

=== Earl of Cromer (1901) ===
- Evelyn Baring, 1st Earl of Cromer (1841–1917)
- Rowland Thomas Baring, 2nd Earl of Cromer (1877–1953)
- George Rowland Stanley Baring, 3rd Earl of Cromer (1918–1991)
- Evelyn Rowland Esmond Baring, 4th Earl of Cromer (born 1946)

The heir apparent is the present holder's son, Alexander Rowland Harmsworth Baring, Viscount Errington (born 1994).

=== Gallery ===
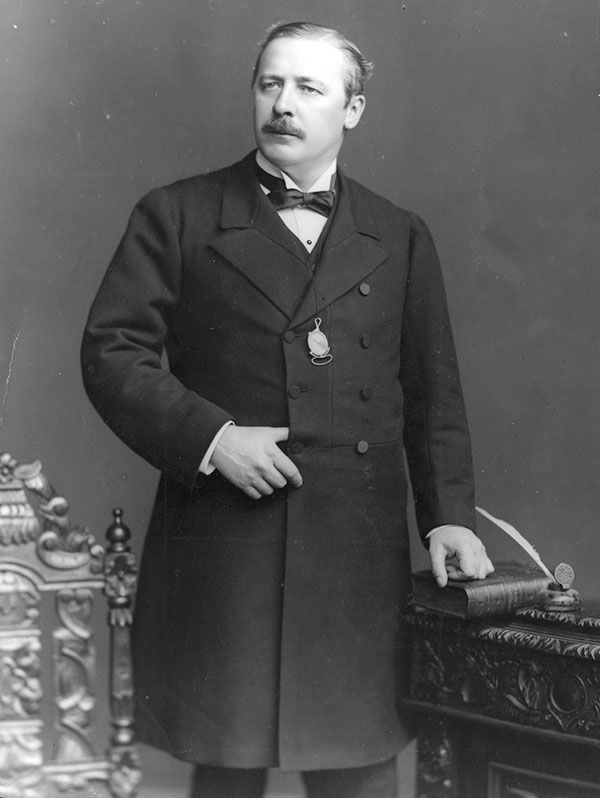
Evelyn Baring, 1st Earl of Cromer

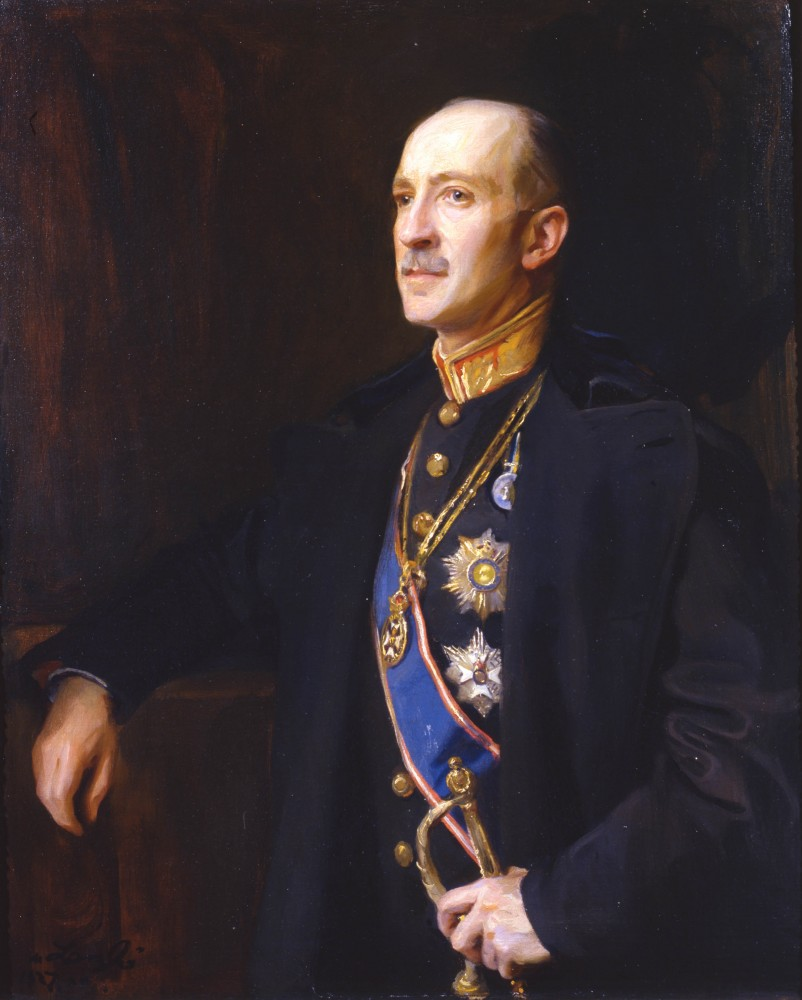
Rowland Baring, 2nd Earl of Cromer

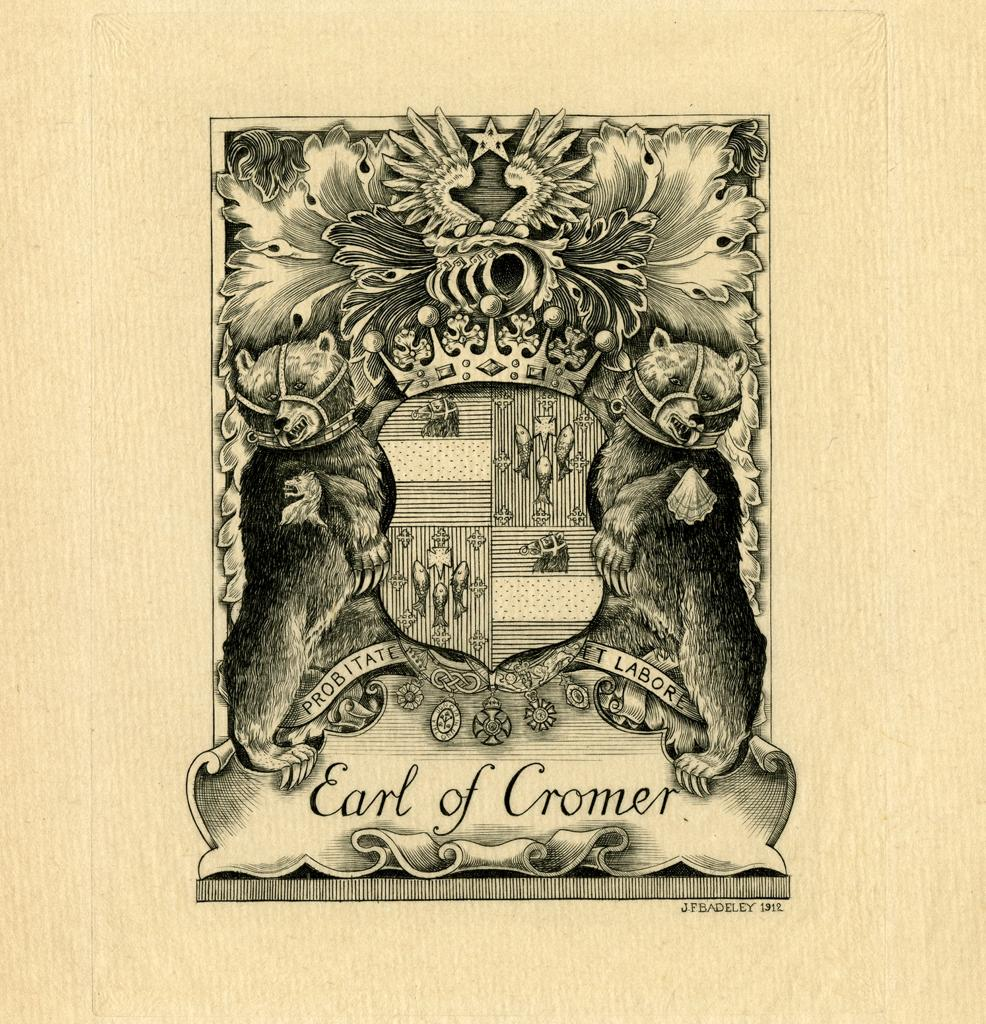
Bookplate by Henry Badeley showing the coat of arms of the Earl of Cromer

== Family tree ==
Baring family tree

Johann (John) Baring (1697–1748)
John Baring (1730–1816)	Sir Francis Baring, 1st Baronet (1740–1810)	Charles Baring (1742–1829)
Sir Thomas Baring, 2nd Baronet (1772–1848)	Alexander Baring, 1st Baron Ashburton (1774–1848)	Henry Baring (1777–1848)	William Baring (1779–1820)	William Baring-Gould (1770–1846)
Francis Baring, 1st Baron Northbrook (1796–1866)	Thomas Baring (1799–1873)	Charles Baring (1807–1879)	Bingham Baring, 2nd Baron Ashburton (1799–1864)	Francis Baring, 3rd Baron Ashburton (1800–1868)	Henry Bingham Baring (1804–1869)	Edward Baring, 1st Baron Revelstoke (1828–1897)	Tom Baring (1839–1923)	Evelyn Baring, 1st Earl of Cromer (1841–1917)	William Baring (1819–1906)	Edward Baring-Gould (1804–1872)
Thomas Baring, 1st Earl of Northbrook (1826–1904)	Francis Baring (1850–1915)	T. C. Baring (1831–1891)	Alexander Baring, 4th Baron Ashburton (1835–1889)	Charles Baring (1829–1890)	John Baring, 2nd Baron Revelstoke (1863–1929)	Cecil Baring, 3rd Baron Revelstoke (1864–1934)	Everard Baring (1865–1932)	Maurice Baring (1874–1945)	Rowland Baring, 2nd Earl of Cromer (1877–1953)	Evelyn Baring, 1st Baron Howick of Glendale (1903–1973)	Rosa Baring (1854–1927)	Sabine Baring-Gould (1834–1924)
Francis Baring, 2nd Earl of Northbrook (1850–1929)	Francis Baring, 4th Baron Northbrook (1882–1947)	Francis Baring, 5th Baron Ashburton (1866–1938)	Guy Baring (1873–1916)	Sir Godfrey Baring, 1st Baronet (1871–1957)	Rupert Baring, 4th Baron Revelstoke (1911–1994)	Rowland Baring, 3rd Earl of Cromer (1918–1991)	Charles Baring, 2nd Baron Howick of Glendale (born 1937)	William Baring-Gould (1878–1921)
Earldom extinct
Francis Baring, 5th Baron Northbrook (1915–1990)	Alexander Baring, 6th Baron Ashburton (1898–1991)	Giles Baring (1910–1986)	Sir Charles Baring, 2nd Baronet (1898–1990)	Helen Azalea Baring (1901–1980)	Raymond Baring (1912–1967)	John Baring, 5th Baron Revelstoke (1934–2003)	James Baring, 6th Baron Revelstoke (1938–2012)	Evelyn Baring, 4th Earl of Cromer (born 1946)	William S. Baring-Gould (1913–1967)
Francis Baring, 6th Baron Northbrook (born 1954)	John Baring, 7th Baron Ashburton (1928–2020)	Sir John Baring, 3rd Baronet (born 1947)	Alexander Baring, 7th Baron Revelstoke (born 1970)
Mark Baring, 8th Baron Ashburton (born 1958)

== See also ==
- Baron Northbrook
- Baron Revelstoke
- Baron Ashburton
- Baron Howick of Glendale
