= Baring family =

Noble family

Baring
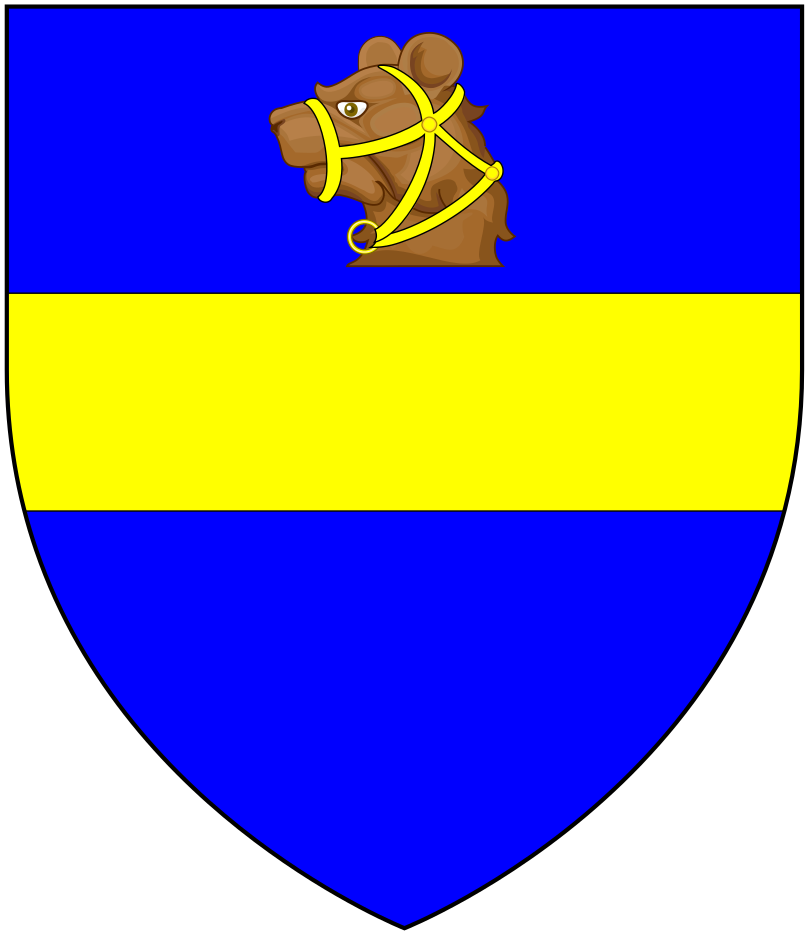
- Current region: Germany, United Kingdom
- Origin: Groningen
- Founded: c. 1500
- Founder: Peter Baring (Petrus Baring)
- Current head: British branch: Francis Baring, 6th Baron Northbrook (eldest agnatic line)
- Titles: Baron Ashburton; Baron Northbrook; Viscount Baring (extinct); Earl of Northbrook (extinct); Baron Revelstoke; Baron Cromer; Viscount Cromer; Viscount Errington; Earl of Cromer; Baron Howick of Glendale; Baring Baronets

The Baring family is a German and British family of merchants and bankers. In Germany, the family belongs to the Bildungsbürgertum, and in England, it belongs to the aristocracy.

Barings Bank was founded in 1762 as the John and Francis Baring Company by Sir Francis Baring, 1st Baronet, with his older brother John Baring as a mostly silent partner. It became one of the leading merchant banks of Britain.

In 1802, Barings and Hope & Co. were called on to facilitate the largest land purchase in history: the Louisiana Purchase, which doubled the size of the United States. It is regarded as "one of the most historically significant trades of all time". Barings also helped to finance the United States government during the War of 1812. By 1818, Barings was called "the sixth great European power", after England, France, Prussia, Austria and Russia. A fall-off in business and some poor leadership in 1820s caused Barings to cede its dominance in the City of London to the rival firm of N M Rothschild & Sons.

== History ==
The family's earliest known ancestor is Peter Baring (or Petrus Baring), who was a burgher of the city of Groningen, then a semi-independent city-state that was part of the Holy Roman Empire and the Hanseatic League, now part of the Netherlands, around 1500. Peter Baring's son Franz Baring (Franciscus Baringius) became the first Lutheran bishop of Lauenburg in what is now Schleswig-Holstein (then in the Duchy of Saxe-Lauenburg) in Germany from 1565. The current family in Germany and England is descended from Franz Baring. In the Electorate of Hanover, the Baring family belonged to the upper bourgeoisie, the so-called Hübsche Familien (from hübsch, pretty, or good looking), which comprised the third division of the ruling class of the Holy Roman Empire, after the nobility and the clergy.

The English branch of the family is descended from Franz Baring (1657–1697), a professor of theology in Bremen. He was the father of Johann Baring (1697–1748), who moved from his hometown of Bremen to Exeter in England to take up an apprenticeship with a wool-exporter in 1717. Over the years, Johann Baring, who was later also known as John, built a small fortune as a wool merchant. His sons Francis and John Baring moved to London, where in 1762 they founded the John and Francis Baring Company, commonly known as Barings Bank. Barings Bank became one of the leading London merchant banks in the nineteenth century, until it collapsed in 1995. Francis Baring was the father of Sir Thomas Baring, 2nd Baronet, and grandfather to Francis Baring, 1st Baron Northbrook. He was also father to Alexander Baring, 1st Baron Ashburton, and through his third son Henry Baring the grandfather of Edward Baring, 1st Baron Revelstoke, and Evelyn Baring, 1st Earl of Cromer.

Arnulf Baring (1932–2019) was a member of the branch of the family remaining in Germany.

Since the early 19th century, the Baring family maintained close relations with the Berenberg family of bankers.

== Hereditary titles ==
The Baring family is one of the most titled in the United Kingdom, since several family members were created peers or baronets. The family has held the following British peerage titles:

- Baron Ashburton (created 1835)
- Baron Northbrook (created 1866)
- Earl of Northbrook and Viscount Baring (created 1876; extinct 1929)
- Baron Revelstoke (created 1885)
- Earl of Cromer and Viscount Errington (created 1901)
  - also Baron Cromer (created 1892) and Viscount Cromer (created 1899)
- Baron Howick of Glendale (created 1960)

In addition, two baronetcies have been created for members of the family (in 1793 and 1911):

- see Baring baronets

== Gallery ==
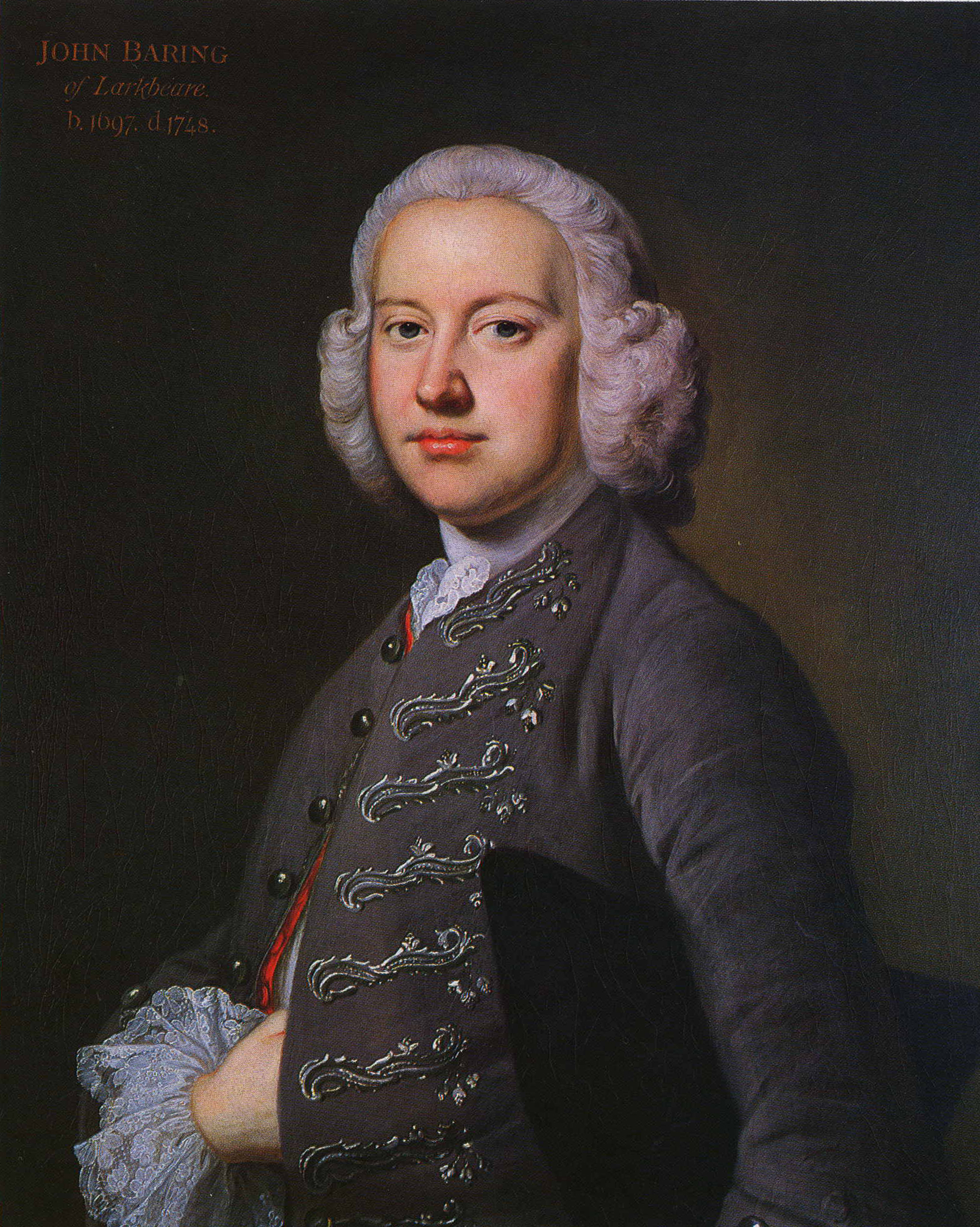
Johann Baring

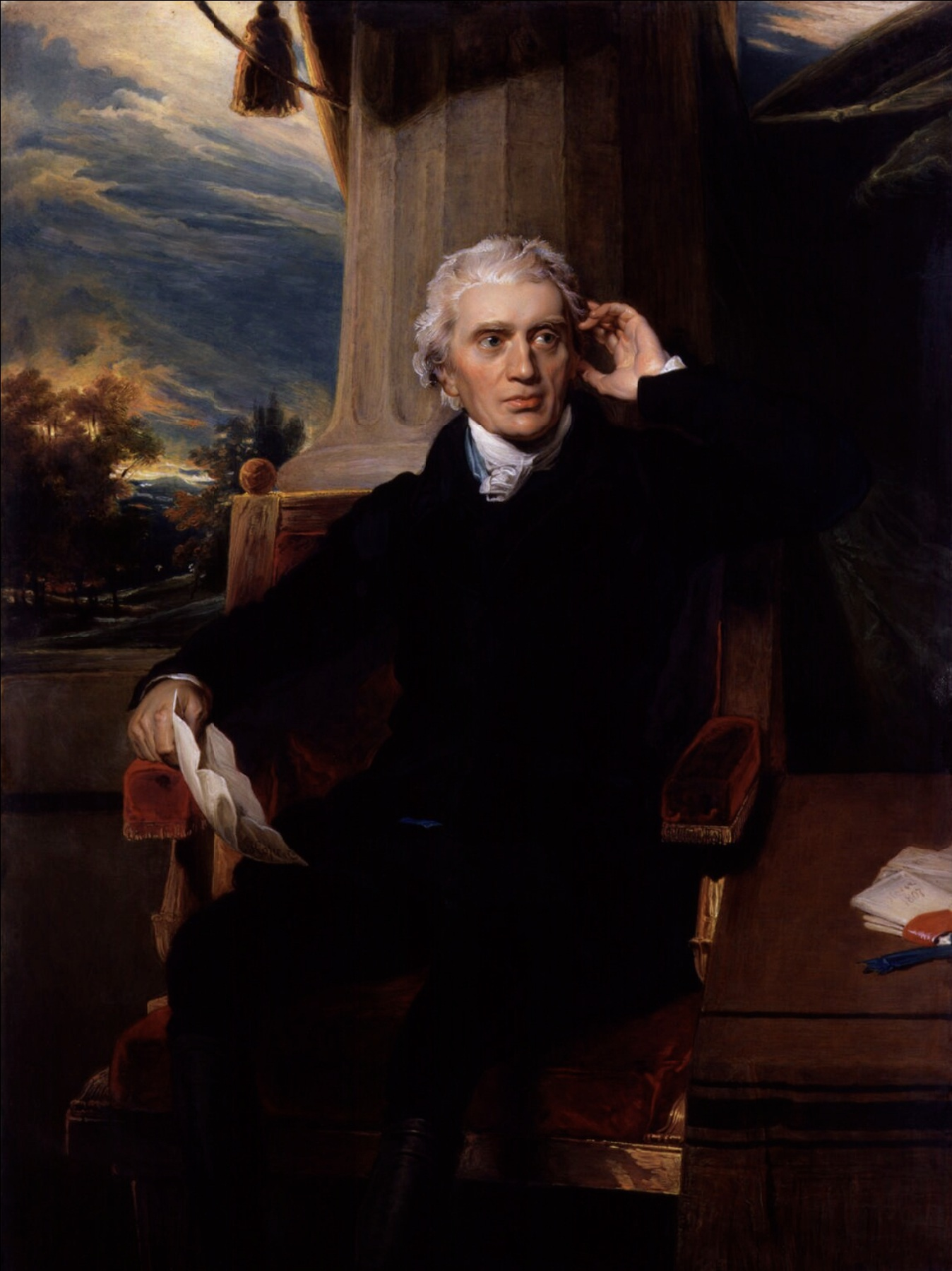
Sir Francis Baring, 1st Baronet

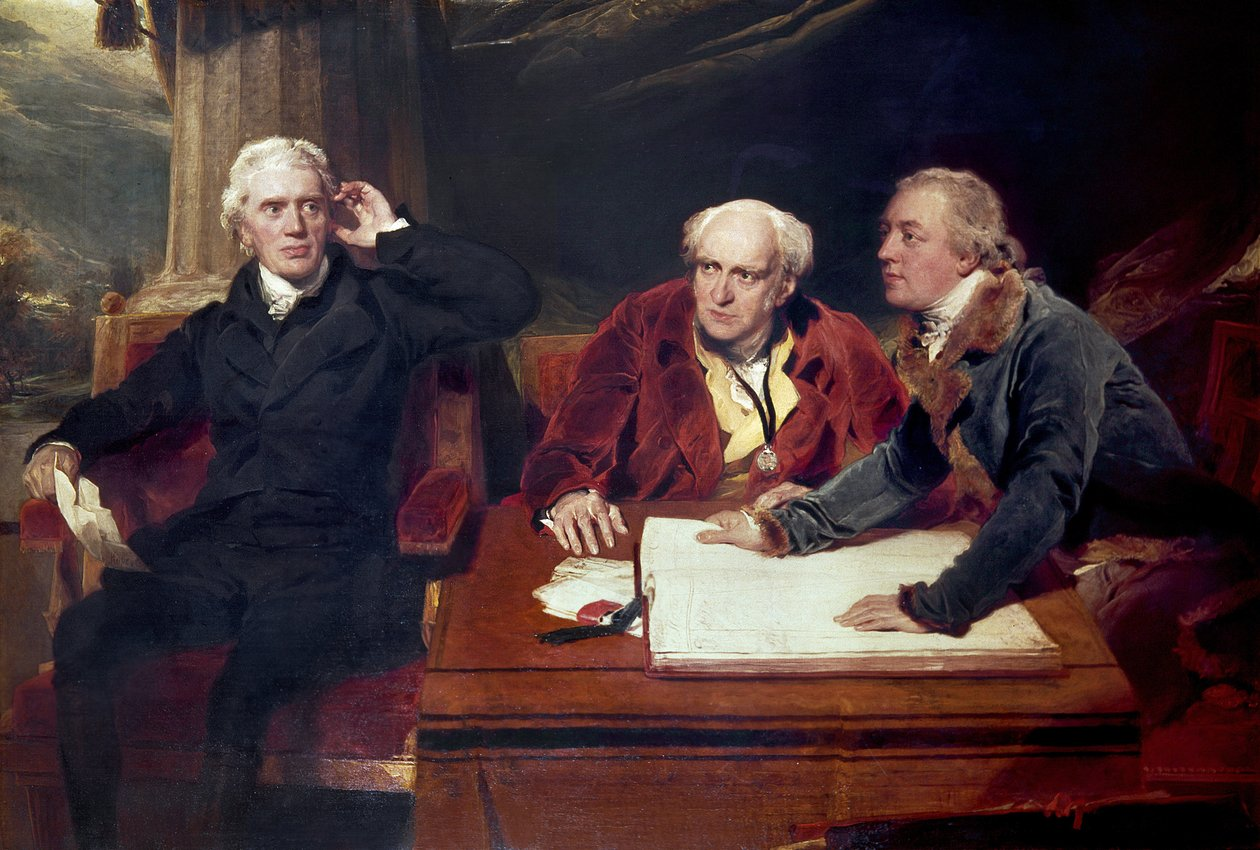
Sir Francis Baring (left), with brother John Baring and son-in-law Charles Wall

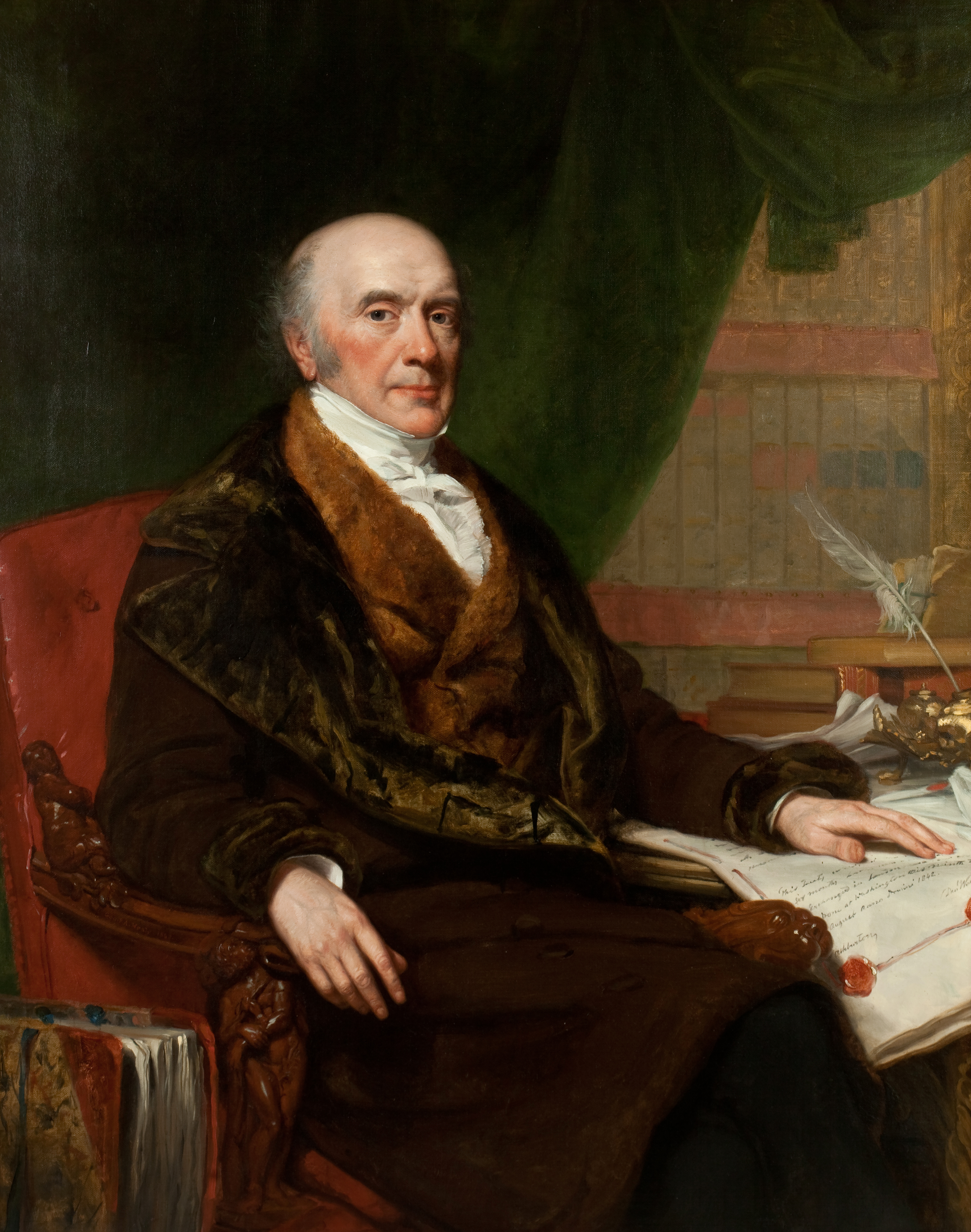
Alexander Baring, 1st Baron Ashburton

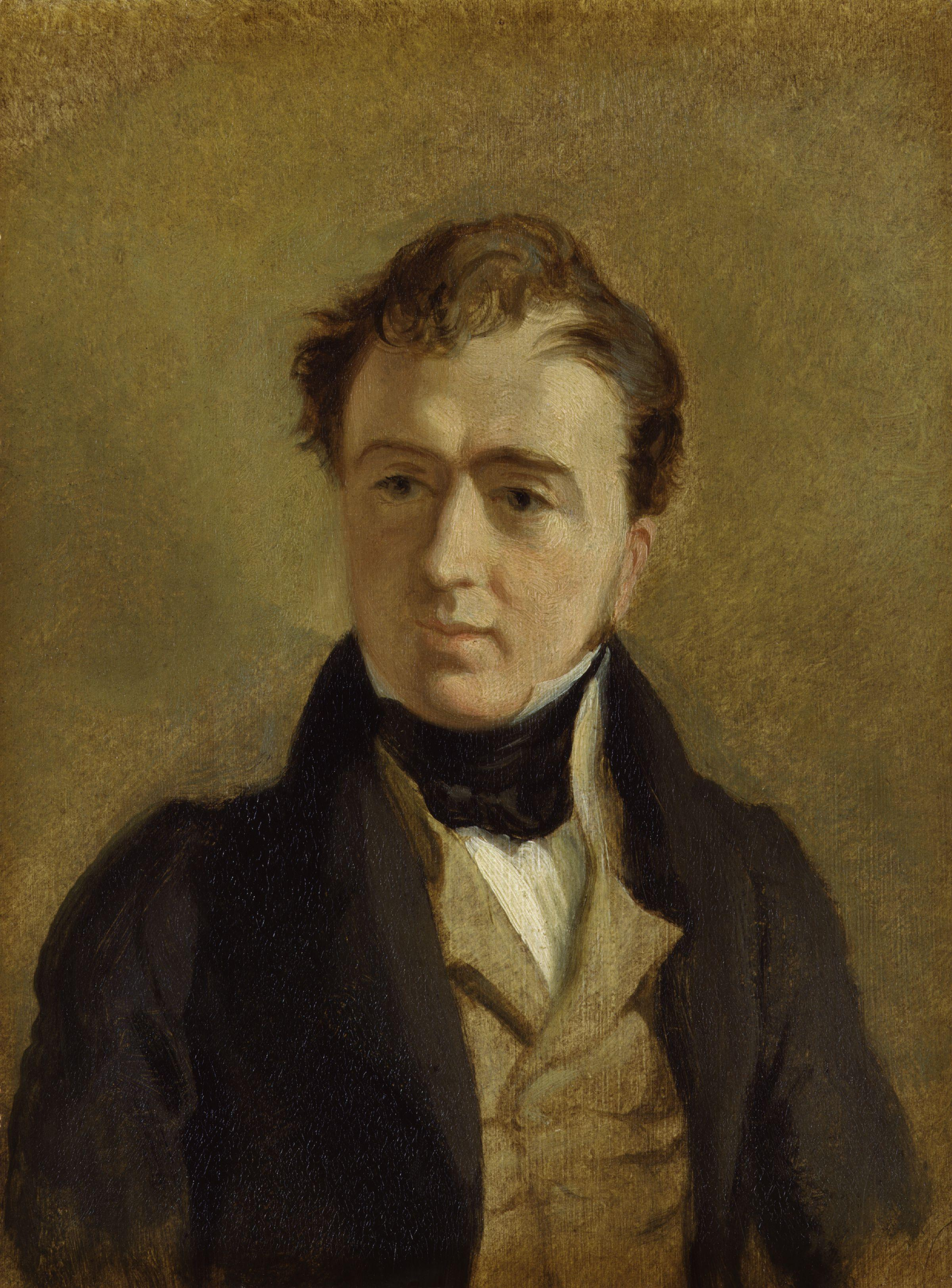
Francis Baring, 1st Baron Northbrook

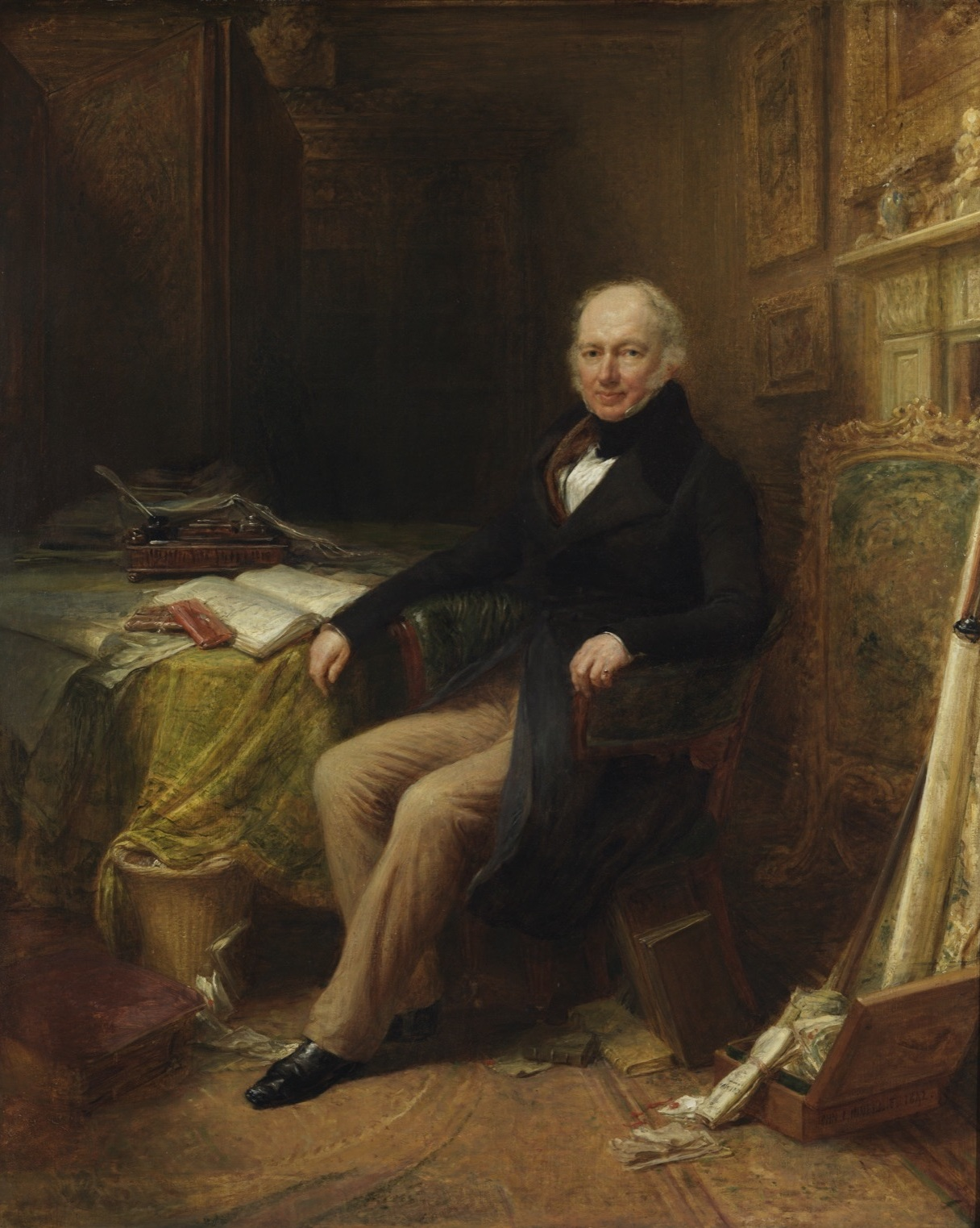
Sir Thomas Baring

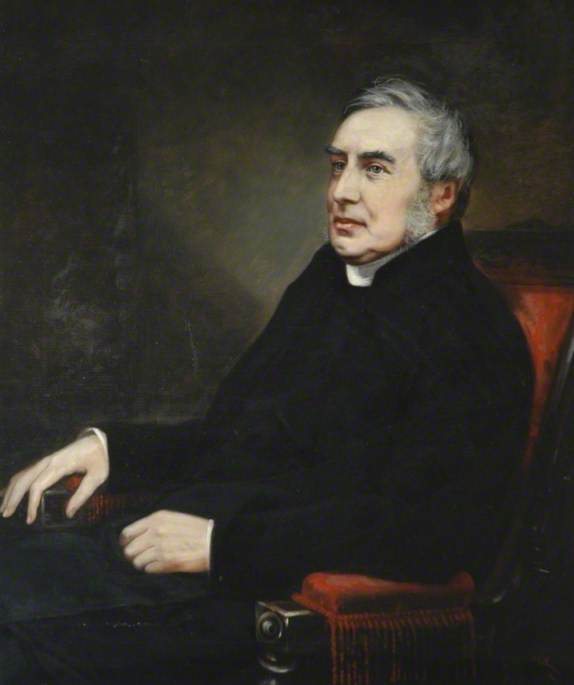
Bishop Charles Baring

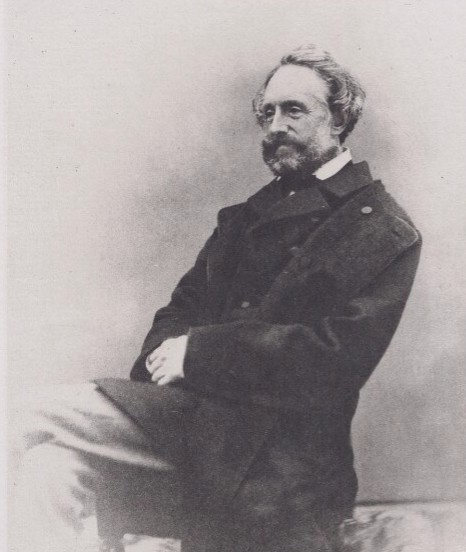
Bingham Baring, 2nd Baron Ashburton

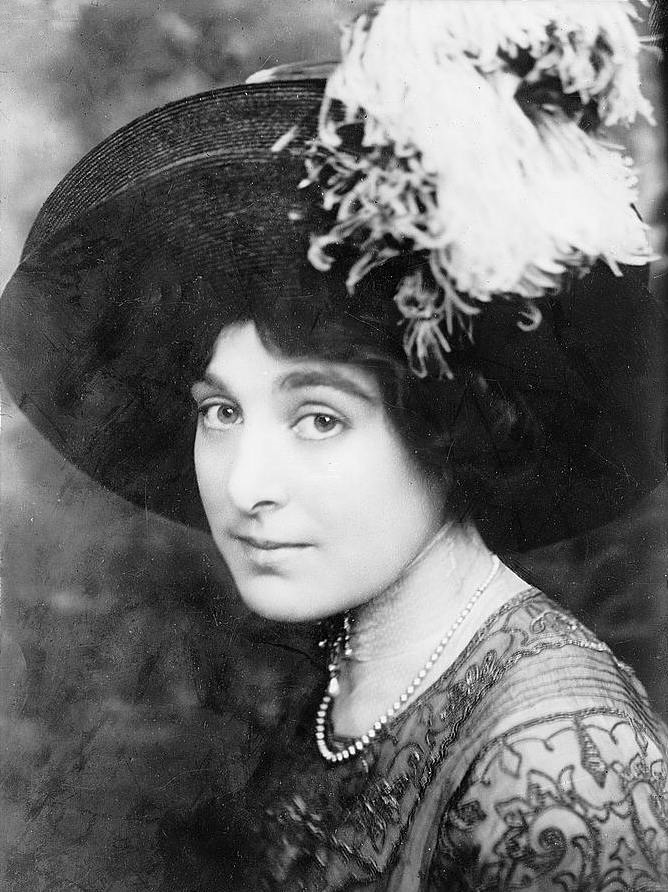
Louisa Baring, Lady Ashburton, second wife of Bingham Baring

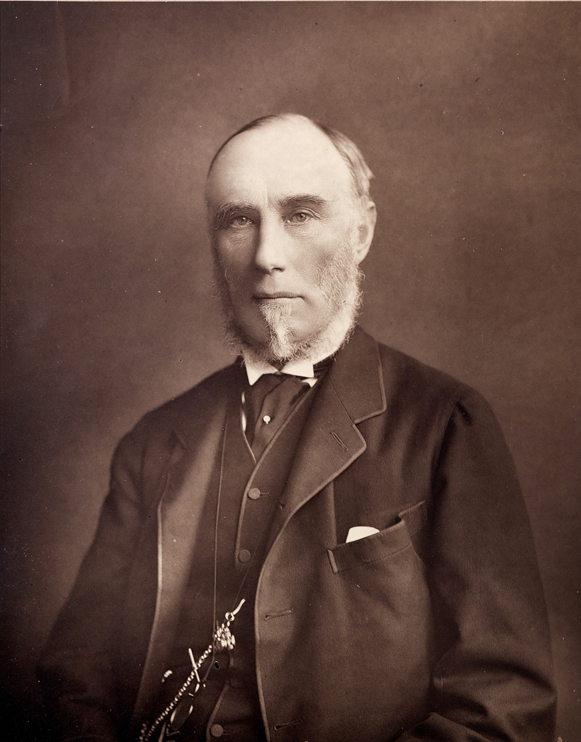
Thomas Baring, 1st Earl of Northbrook

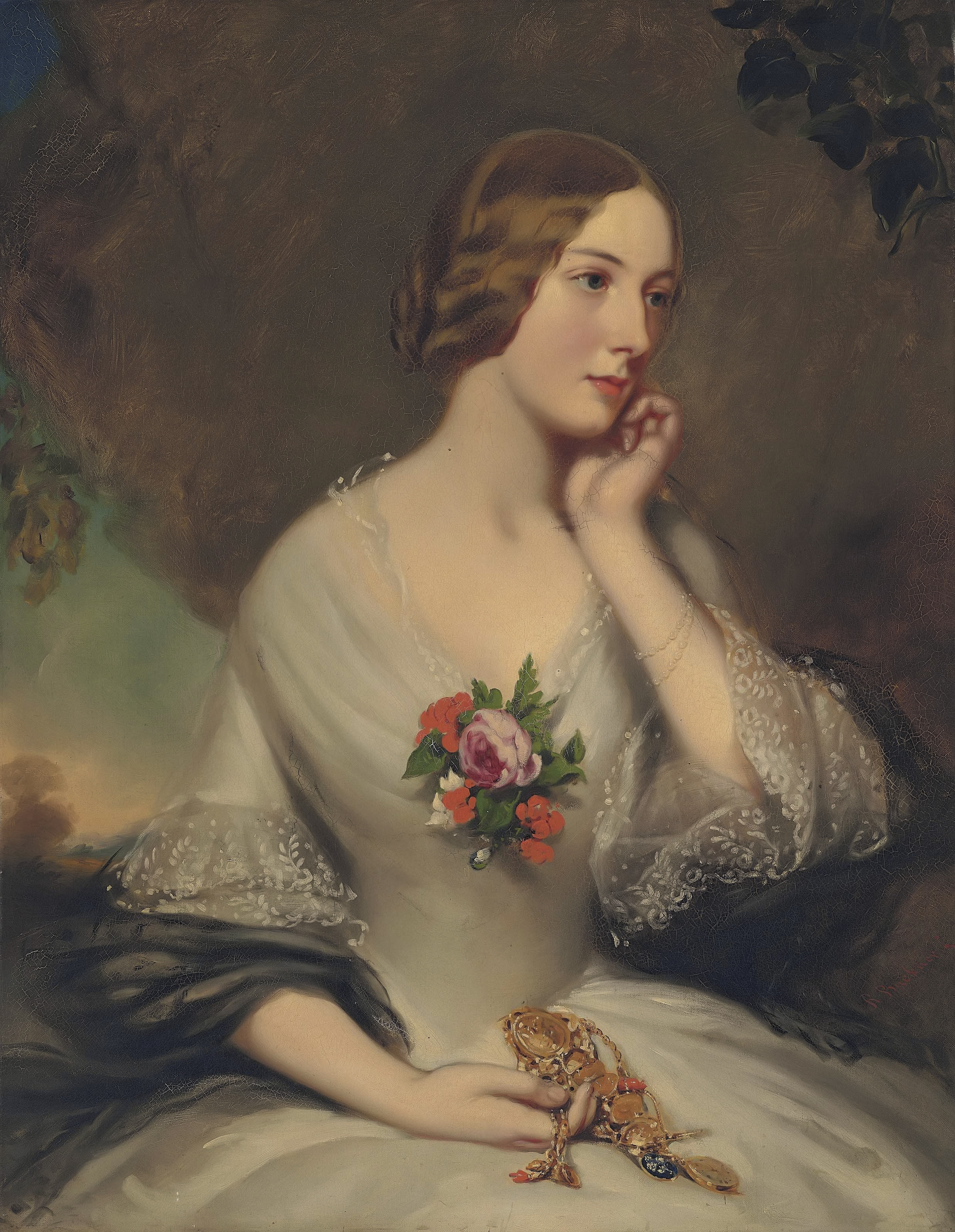
Elizabeth Baring, wife of Thomas Baring

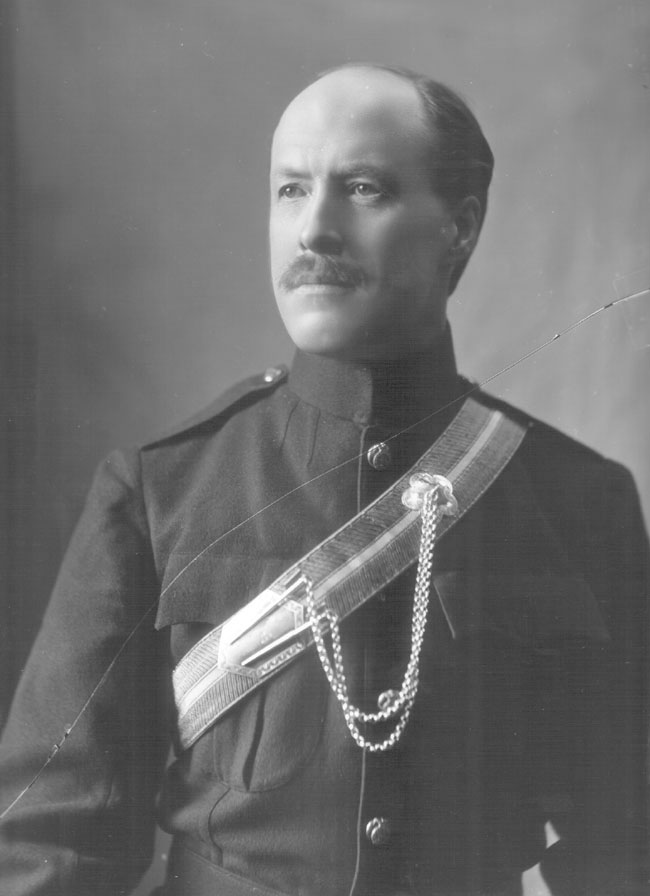
Francis Baring, 5th Baron Ashburton

== Family tree ==
Baring family tree

Johann (John) Baring (1697–1748)
John Baring (1730–1816)	Sir Francis Baring, 1st Baronet (1740–1810)	Charles Baring (1742–1829)
Sir Thomas Baring, 2nd Baronet (1772–1848)	Alexander Baring, 1st Baron Ashburton (1774–1848)	Henry Baring (1777–1848)	William Baring (1779–1820)	William Baring-Gould (1770–1846)
Francis Baring, 1st Baron Northbrook (1796–1866)	Thomas Baring (1799–1873)	Charles Baring (1807–1879)	Bingham Baring, 2nd Baron Ashburton (1799–1864)	Francis Baring, 3rd Baron Ashburton (1800–1868)	Henry Bingham Baring (1804–1869)	Edward Baring, 1st Baron Revelstoke (1828–1897)	Tom Baring (1839–1923)	Evelyn Baring, 1st Earl of Cromer (1841–1917)	William Baring (1819–1906)	Edward Baring-Gould (1804–1872)
Thomas Baring, 1st Earl of Northbrook (1826–1904)	Francis Baring (1850–1915)	T. C. Baring (1831–1891)	Alexander Baring, 4th Baron Ashburton (1835–1889)	Charles Baring (1829–1890)	John Baring, 2nd Baron Revelstoke (1863–1929)	Cecil Baring, 3rd Baron Revelstoke (1864–1934)	Everard Baring (1865–1932)	Maurice Baring (1874–1945)	Rowland Baring, 2nd Earl of Cromer (1877–1953)	Evelyn Baring, 1st Baron Howick of Glendale (1903–1973)	Rosa Baring (1854–1927)	Sabine Baring-Gould (1834–1924)
Francis Baring, 2nd Earl of Northbrook (1850–1929)	Francis Baring, 4th Baron Northbrook (1882–1947)	Francis Baring, 5th Baron Ashburton (1866–1938)	Guy Baring (1873–1916)	Sir Godfrey Baring, 1st Baronet (1871–1957)	Rupert Baring, 4th Baron Revelstoke (1911–1994)	Rowland Baring, 3rd Earl of Cromer (1918–1991)	Charles Baring, 2nd Baron Howick of Glendale (born 1937)	William Baring-Gould (1878–1921)
Earldom extinct
Francis Baring, 5th Baron Northbrook (1915–1990)	Alexander Baring, 6th Baron Ashburton (1898–1991)	Giles Baring (1910–1986)	Sir Charles Baring, 2nd Baronet (1898–1990)	Helen Azalea Baring (1901–1980)	Raymond Baring (1912–1967)	John Baring, 5th Baron Revelstoke (1934–2003)	James Baring, 6th Baron Revelstoke (1938–2012)	Evelyn Baring, 4th Earl of Cromer (born 1946)	William S. Baring-Gould (1913–1967)
Francis Baring, 6th Baron Northbrook (born 1954)	John Baring, 7th Baron Ashburton (1928–2020)	Sir John Baring, 3rd Baronet (born 1947)	Alexander Baring, 7th Baron Revelstoke (born 1970)
Mark Baring, 8th Baron Ashburton (born 1958)
