= Johann Baring =

German-born British merchant (1697–1748)

John Baring
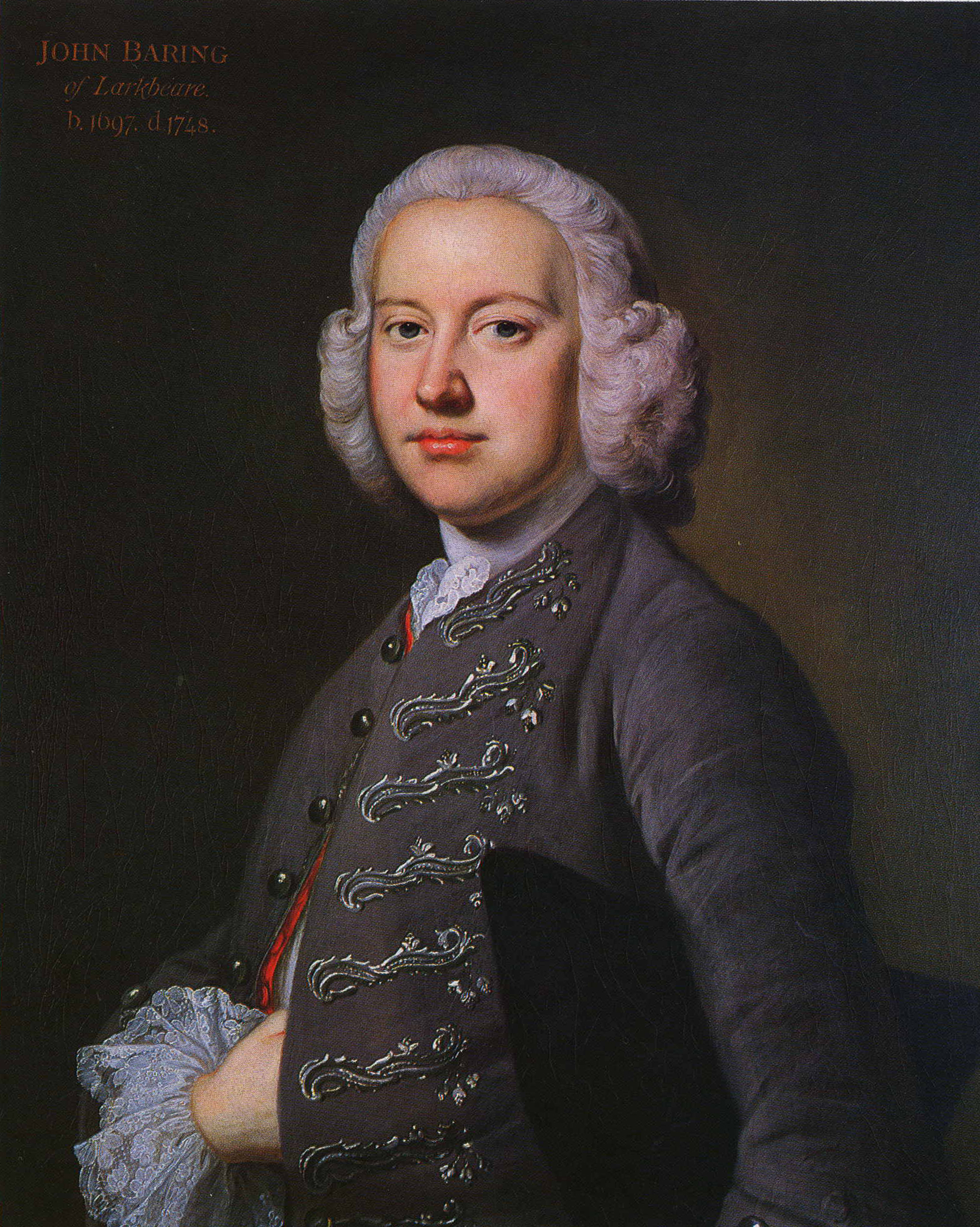
- Portrait by William Hoare, 1740
- Born: Johann Baring; November 15, 1697; Bremen, Holy Roman Empire
- Died: 1748 (aged 50–51); West Country, England
- Occupation: Merchant
- Spouse: Elizabeth Vowler
- Relatives: John Baring (son); Francis Baring (son)

John Baring (born Johann Baring; 15 November 1697 – c. 1748) was a German-born British merchant. Born in the Duchies of Bremen and Verden, he subsequently emigrated to the Kingdom of Great Britain in 1717 as the apprentice of a wool merchant. His decision to settle permanently in England started the Baring family on the road to becoming one of the leading banking families in the world.

== Early life ==
Johann Baring was born in Bremen, one of the old Hanseatic cities of northern Germany. He was the posthumous son of Franz Baring (1657–1697), a professor of theology in Bremen, who died aged forty only a few weeks before Johann was born, by his wife Rebecca Vogds, the daughter of one of Bremen's leading wool merchants. Following the early death of Johann's father, he was brought up by the Vogds family.

== Move to England ==
At the age of twenty Johann was sent to England to learn the wool trade in Exeter, Devon. Originally having planned to return to Bremen after his apprenticeship, he decided to stay in England, where he obtained citizenship in 1723 and Anglicised his first name from Johann to John.

== Marriage and progeny ==
John married Elizabeth Vowler (1702–1766), the daughter of a prosperous Exeter grocer, who brought with her a large dowry of £20,000 and business sense to match that of her new husband. By Elizabeth he had the following progeny, 4 sons and 1 daughter:

- John Baring (1730–1816), who in partnership with his younger brother Francis, established the London merchant house of John and Francis Baring Company, which eventually became Barings Bank
- Thomas Baring (1733–1758)
- Sir Francis Baring, 1st Baronet (1740–1810), who in partnership with his elder brother John, established the London merchant house of John and Francis Baring Company, which eventually became Barings Bank
- Charles Baring (1742–1829), 4th son, of Courtland, Exmouth, Devon, who married Margaret Gould (1743–1803), daughter and eventual heiress in her issue of William Drake Gould (1719–1767) of Lew Trenchard. Her monument survives in Lympstone Church, Devon. The Gould family was descended from a certain John Gold, a crusader present at the siege of Damietta in 1217 who for his valour was granted in 1220 by Ralph de Vallibus an estate at Seaborough in Somerset. His son William Baring (d. 1846), JP, DL, in 1795 assumed by royal licence the additional surname and arms of Gould, in accordance with the terms of his inheritance of the manor of Lew Trenchard. William's grandson was the author Rev. Sabine Baring-Gould (1834–1924) of Lew Trenchard.
- Elizabeth Baring (1744–1809) who in 1780 married John Dunning (1731–1783) of Ashburton, Devon, MP for Calne, who in 1782 was created Baron Ashburton.

== Residences ==
By 1737 the Barings moved from the City of Exeter and purchased as their country residence Larkbeare House, (a substantial 16th century house a fragment of which survives at no. 38 Holloway Street, Exeter, having been largely demolished by 19th century road-widening) and thirty seven acres of land, then just outside the city. Adjacent to Larkbeare was the estate of Mount Radford, which was later the family's residence. Shortly before his death John purchased Lindridge House, Bishopsteignton, near Exeter.

== Death ==
By the time of John's death aged fifty-one, the Barings were one of the wealthiest families in the West Country. Baring Crescent, Exeter, developed with Regency villas 1818–1828, was named after the family.

== Family tree ==
Baring family tree

Johann (John) Baring (1697–1748)
John Baring (1730–1816)	Sir Francis Baring, 1st Baronet (1740–1810)	Charles Baring (1742–1829)
Sir Thomas Baring, 2nd Baronet (1772–1848)	Alexander Baring, 1st Baron Ashburton (1774–1848)	Henry Baring (1777–1848)	William Baring (1779–1820)	William Baring-Gould (1770–1846)
Francis Baring, 1st Baron Northbrook (1796–1866)	Thomas Baring (1799–1873)	Charles Baring (1807–1879)	Bingham Baring, 2nd Baron Ashburton (1799–1864)	Francis Baring, 3rd Baron Ashburton (1800–1868)	Henry Bingham Baring (1804–1869)	Edward Baring, 1st Baron Revelstoke (1828–1897)	Tom Baring (1839–1923)	Evelyn Baring, 1st Earl of Cromer (1841–1917)	William Baring (1819–1906)	Edward Baring-Gould (1804–1872)
Thomas Baring, 1st Earl of Northbrook (1826–1904)	Francis Baring (1850–1915)	T. C. Baring (1831–1891)	Alexander Baring, 4th Baron Ashburton (1835–1889)	Charles Baring (1829–1890)	John Baring, 2nd Baron Revelstoke (1863–1929)	Cecil Baring, 3rd Baron Revelstoke (1864–1934)	Everard Baring (1865–1932)	Maurice Baring (1874–1945)	Rowland Baring, 2nd Earl of Cromer (1877–1953)	Evelyn Baring, 1st Baron Howick of Glendale (1903–1973)	Rosa Baring (1854–1927)	Sabine Baring-Gould (1834–1924)
Francis Baring, 2nd Earl of Northbrook (1850–1929)	Francis Baring, 4th Baron Northbrook (1882–1947)	Francis Baring, 5th Baron Ashburton (1866–1938)	Guy Baring (1873–1916)	Sir Godfrey Baring, 1st Baronet (1871–1957)	Rupert Baring, 4th Baron Revelstoke (1911–1994)	Rowland Baring, 3rd Earl of Cromer (1918–1991)	Charles Baring, 2nd Baron Howick of Glendale (born 1937)	William Baring-Gould (1878–1921)
Earldom extinct
Francis Baring, 5th Baron Northbrook (1915–1990)	Alexander Baring, 6th Baron Ashburton (1898–1991)	Giles Baring (1910–1986)	Sir Charles Baring, 2nd Baronet (1898–1990)	Helen Azalea Baring (1901–1980)	Raymond Baring (1912–1967)	John Baring, 5th Baron Revelstoke (1934–2003)	James Baring, 6th Baron Revelstoke (1938–2012)	Evelyn Baring, 4th Earl of Cromer (born 1946)	William S. Baring-Gould (1913–1967)
Francis Baring, 6th Baron Northbrook (born 1954)	John Baring, 7th Baron Ashburton (1928–2020)	Sir John Baring, 3rd Baronet (born 1947)	Alexander Baring, 7th Baron Revelstoke (born 1970)
Mark Baring, 8th Baron Ashburton (born 1958)
