= Thomas Baring =

Thomas Baring may refer to:

- Sir Thomas Baring, 2nd Baronet (1772–1848), British MP for High Wycombe and Hampshire
- Thomas Baring (1799–1873), British banker and MP for Huntingdon, 1844–1873
- Thomas Baring, 1st Earl of Northbrook (1826–1904), English statesman
- Thomas Charles Baring (1831–1891), British banker and Conservative politician
- Tom Baring (1839–1923), British banker
