= Evelyn Baring =

Evelyn Baring may refer to:

- Evelyn Baring, 1st Earl of Cromer (1841–1917), Consul-General of Egypt from 1883 to 1907
- Evelyn Baring, 1st Baron Howick of Glendale (1903–1973), his son, and Governor of Kenya from 1952 to 1959
- Evelyn Baring, 4th Earl of Cromer (born 1946) British peer and business man
