= Arnulf Baring =

German lawyer, writer and academic (1932–2019)

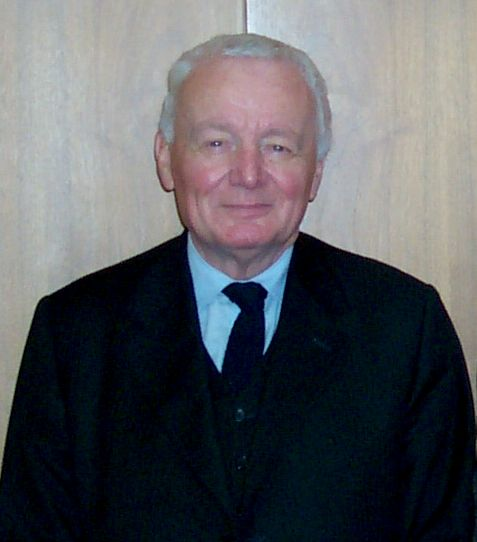
- Baring in 2002
- Born: Arnulf Martin Baring; 8 May 1932; Dresden, Germany
- Died: 2 March 2019 (aged 86); Berlin, Germany
- Occupations: Lawyer, journalist, historian, author
- Awards: Commander Cross of the Order of Merit of the Federal Republic of Germany (1998)

Arnulf Martin Baring (8 May 1932 – 2 March 2019) was a German lawyer, journalist, political scientist, contemporary historian and author. He was a member of the German-British Baring family of bankers.

== Life ==
Arnulf Baring was born in Dresden to jurist and politician Martin Eberhard Baring (1904–1989) and Gertrud Stolze. He was the grandson of German jurist Adolf Baring (1860–1945).

Baring earned a doctorate at the Free University of Berlin in 1958. In 1968 he was invited by Henry Kissinger to teach at the Harvard Center for International Affairs, and the following year, he was appointed as Professor at the Free University of Berlin, where he taught until his retirement in 1998.

In 1997, he expressed concern that the European Monetary Union would make Germans the most hated people in Europe. Baring was aware of the possibility that the people in Mediterranean countries would regard Germans as economic policemen, predicting that the currency bloc would end up with blackmailing its member countries.

He worked at the Bundespräsidialamt (Office of the German President) from 1976 to 1979. He was initially a member of the SPD, but was expelled from the party in 1983, after publicly supporting liberal Hans-Dietrich Genscher. He was affiliated with the Institute for Advanced Study in Princeton 1992–1993 and was a Fellow of St Antony's College, Oxford, 1993–1994.

He received the Commander Cross of the Order of Merit of the Federal Republic of Germany (Großes Bundesverdienstkreuz des Verdienstordens der Bundesrepublik Deutschland) in 1998.

Baring was a founding member of the Förderverein der Gedenkstätte Berlin-Hohenschönhausen and the scientific advisory board of the Centre Against Expulsions.

== Personal life and death ==
Baring married the psychological practitioner Gabriele (née Oettgen) in 1986. The couple had two children. Arnulf Baring also had two adult daughters from his first marriage. He was a distant relative of Johann Baring, who immigrated to England and created the British Baring lineage.

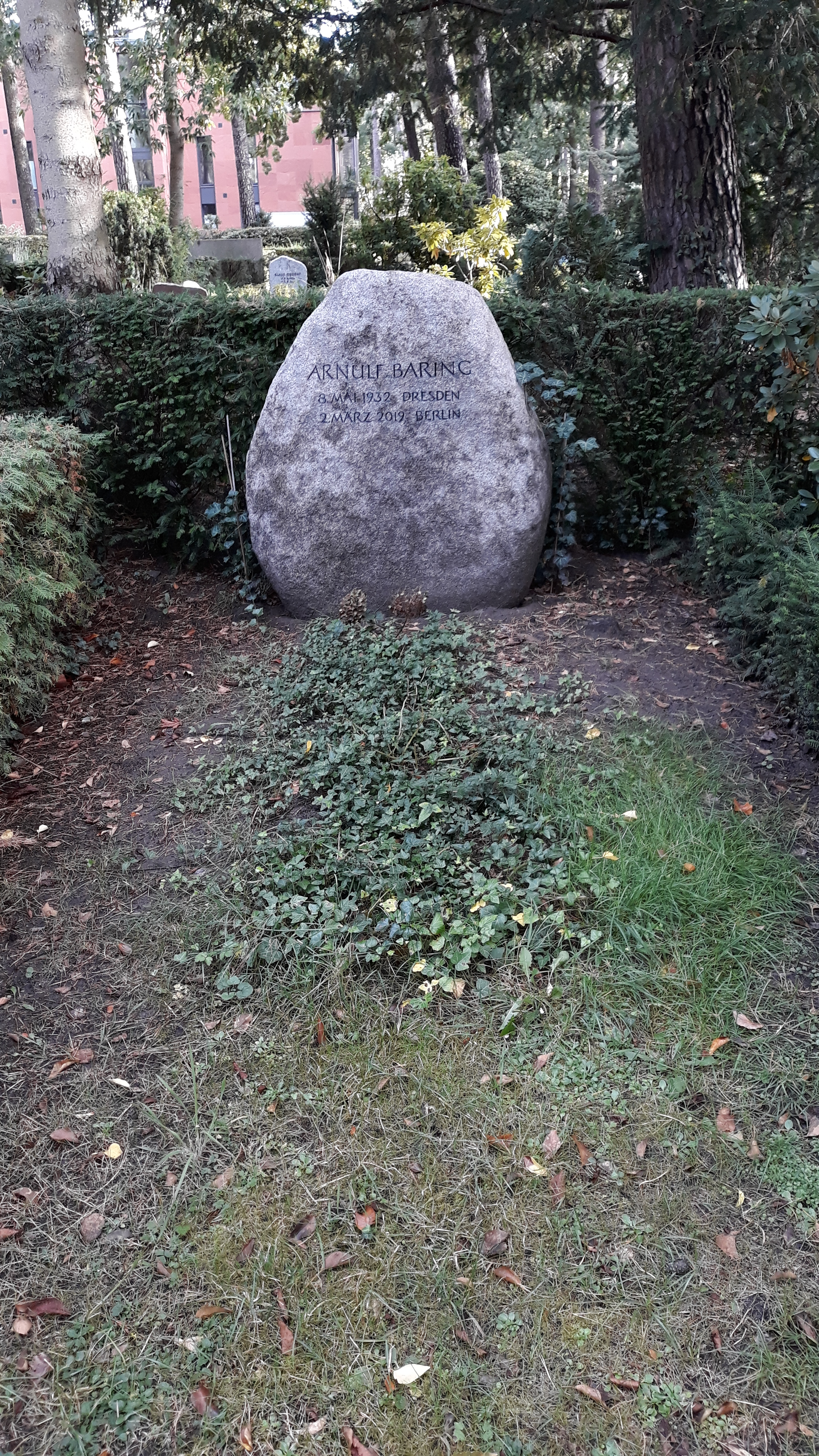
Baring's grave

He died 2 March 2019 in Berlin, at the age of 86.

== Publications ==
- Kanzler, Krisen, Koalitionen. Siedler, Berlin 2002, ISBN 3-88680-762-2.
- Es lebe die Republik, es lebe Deutschland! Stationen demokratischer Erneuerung 1949–1999. Deutsche Verlags-Anstalt, Stuttgart 1999, ISBN 3-421-05194-1.
- Scheitert Deutschland? Der schwierige Abschied von unseren Wunschwelten, Deutsche Verlags-Anstalt, Stuttgart 1997, ISBN 3-421-05095-3.
- Machtwechsel - Die Ära Brandt-Scheel, Deutsche Verlags-Anstalt, Stuttgart 1982, ISBN 3-421-06095-9.
- Im Anfang war Adenauer. Die Entstehung der Kanzlerdemokratie, München: Deutscher Taschenbuch Verlag, 1982, ISBN 3-423-10097-4.
