= Elizabeth Baring =

English merchant (1702–1766)

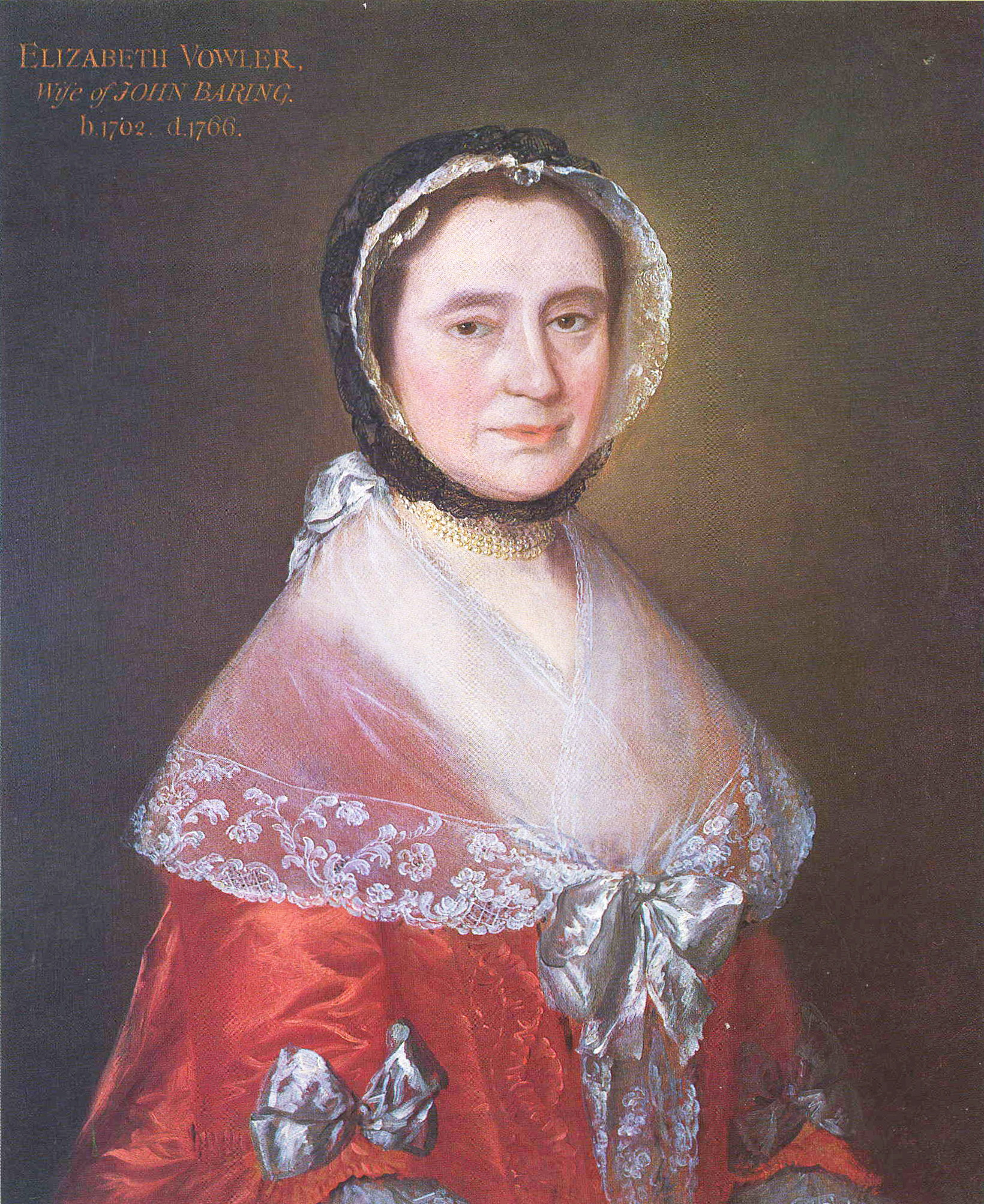
- Born: Elizabeth Vowler; 1702
- Died: 1766 (aged 63–64)
- Occupation: Merchant
- Spouse: Johann Baring (?-1748, his death)
- Children: 5, including John and Francis

Elizabeth Baring (1702 – 1766) was an English merchant.

== Early life ==
Born Elizabeth Vowler, she married the German immigrant Johann Baring, who founded a successful wool trade business which became one of the major companies in the British wooling industry.

== Career ==
She took over the company after the death of her spouse in 1748. She managed it with success and was described as an intelligent woman with a good sense of business, and was among the more successful businesswomen in Britain at the time. Her company grew to become one of the largest in Britain and the foundation of what was later to become the Barings Bank.

== Personal life ==
Elizabeth and Johann Baring had five children:

- John Baring (1730–1816), who in partnership with his younger brother Francis, established the London merchant house of John and Francis Baring Company, which eventually became Barings Bank
- Thomas Baring (1733–1758)
- Sir Francis Baring, 1st Baronet (1740–1810), who in partnership with his elder brother John, established the London merchant house of John and Francis Baring Company, which eventually became Barings Bank
- Charles Baring (1742–1829), 4th son, of Courtland, Exmouth, Devon, who married Margaret Gould (1743–1803), daughter and eventual heiress in her issue of William Drake Gould (1719–1767) of Lew Trenchard.
- Elizabeth Baring (1744–1809) who in 1780 married John Dunning (1731–1783) of Ashburton, Devon, MP for Calne, who in 1782 was created Baron Ashburton.
