= J. D. Hills =

British soldier (1895–1975)

Lt Col John David Hills MC* (1895–1975) was a British soldier. He served with the Leicestershire Regiment during the First World War and his letters have been published online. During the war he was awarded an MC and bar. After the war he read history at Oxford and worked as a teacher; he was master at Eton from 1921 to 1939, and headmaster of Bradfield College from 1940 to 1955.

He married Lady Rosemary Baring, elder daughter of Rowland Baring, 2nd Earl of Cromer in 1932. They had two daughters and one son:

- Jean Adini Hills (1933–2005), married Brig. Hon. Henry Ernest Christopher Willoughby (divorced 1990)
- Margaret Ruby Hills (born 1934), married Michael Giles Neish Walker CBE
- Colonel John Evelyn Hills (1939–2009)
