= Rowland Baring, 2nd Earl of Cromer =

British diplomat and courtier

The Right Honourable The Earl of Cromer GCB GCIE GCVO PC
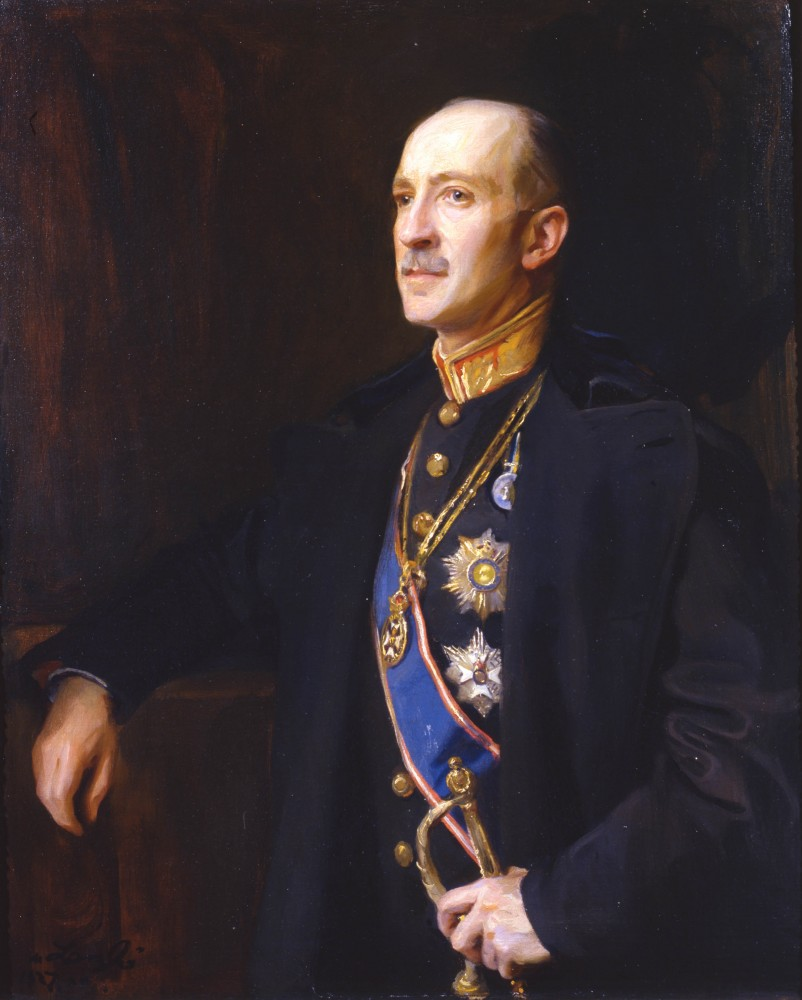
- 1927 portrait

Lord Chamberlain
- In office 1922–1938
- Preceded by: The Duke of Atholl
- Succeeded by: The Earl of Clarendon

Personal details
- Born: Rowland Thomas Baring; 29 November 1877
- Died: 13 May 1953 (aged 75) London, England
- Spouse: Lady Ruby Elliot-Murray-Kynynmound (m. 1908; died 1953)
- Children: Lady Rosemary Hills; Lady Violet Vernon; Rowland Baring, 3rd Earl of Cromer
- Parent(s): Evelyn Baring, 1st Earl of Cromer; Ethel Errington

Rowland Thomas Baring, 2nd Earl of Cromer, GCB, GCIE, GCVO, PC (29 November 1877 – 13 May 1953), styled Viscount Errington between 1901 and 1917, was a British diplomat and courtier.

== Early life ==
Baring was a member of the Baring family and the son of Evelyn Baring, 1st Earl of Cromer and, his first wife, Ethel Errington. After his mother died in 1898, his father married Katherine Thynne in 1901. He had two brothers, the Hon. Windham Baring, who became a director of Baring Brothers bank; and Evelyn Baring, 1st Baron Howick of Glendale, who was a High Commissioner for Southern Africa, and a Governor of Kenya.

His father was the ninth son of Henry Baring (himself the third son of Sir Francis Baring, 1st Baronet) and his second wife, Cecilia Anne (née Windham). Among his paternal family were uncles, Edward Baring, 1st Baron Revelstoke, diplomat Walter Baring, and banker Tom Baring. His maternal grandfather was Sir Rowland Errington, 11th Baronet.

== Career ==
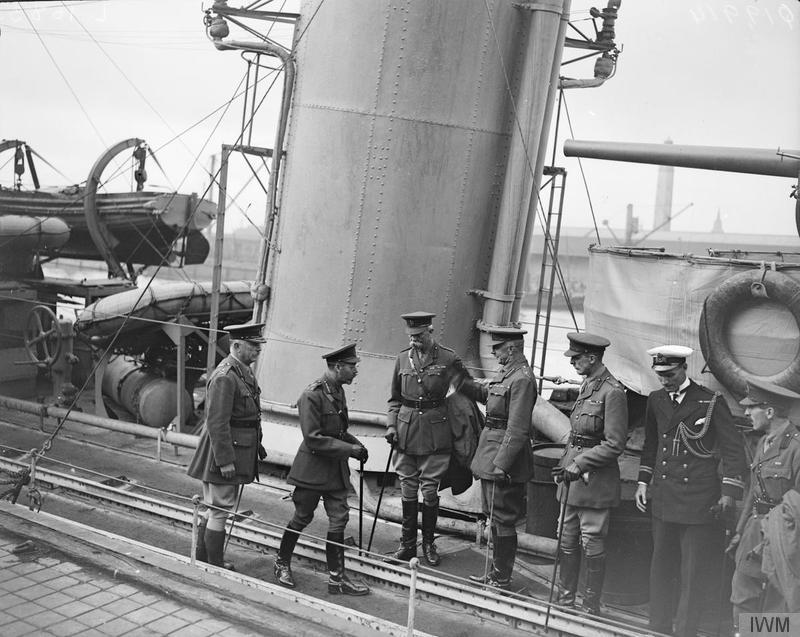
King George V about to disembark from the Royal Navy flotilla leader Whirlwind at Calais, 5 August 1918. With him are Lieutenant-General George Fowke, the Adjutant-General of the British Expeditionary Force; Arthur Bigge, 1st Baron Stamfordham; Lieutenant-General Joseph Asser; Major Edward Thompson, the aide-de-camp to Field Marshal Sir Douglas Haig; Lieutenant Gush RN; and Rowland Baring, 2nd Earl of Cromer.

He was appointed to the Diplomatic Service as a Third Secretary in July 1902. His diplomatic career took him to Egypt, Iran and Russia.

During the First World War he served as a subaltern in the Grenadier Guards. He was aide de camp to the Viceroy of India, and then (from 1916) served as equerry and assistant private secretary to King George V. From 1922 to 1938 he was Lord Chamberlain of the Household. As Lord Chamberlain, he was responsible "for the censorship of plays performed in Britain".

After retiring as Lord Chamberlain, he became permanent Lord-in-Waiting to King George VI, holding the same office after the ascension of the King's daughter, Queen Elizabeth II.

== Personal life ==
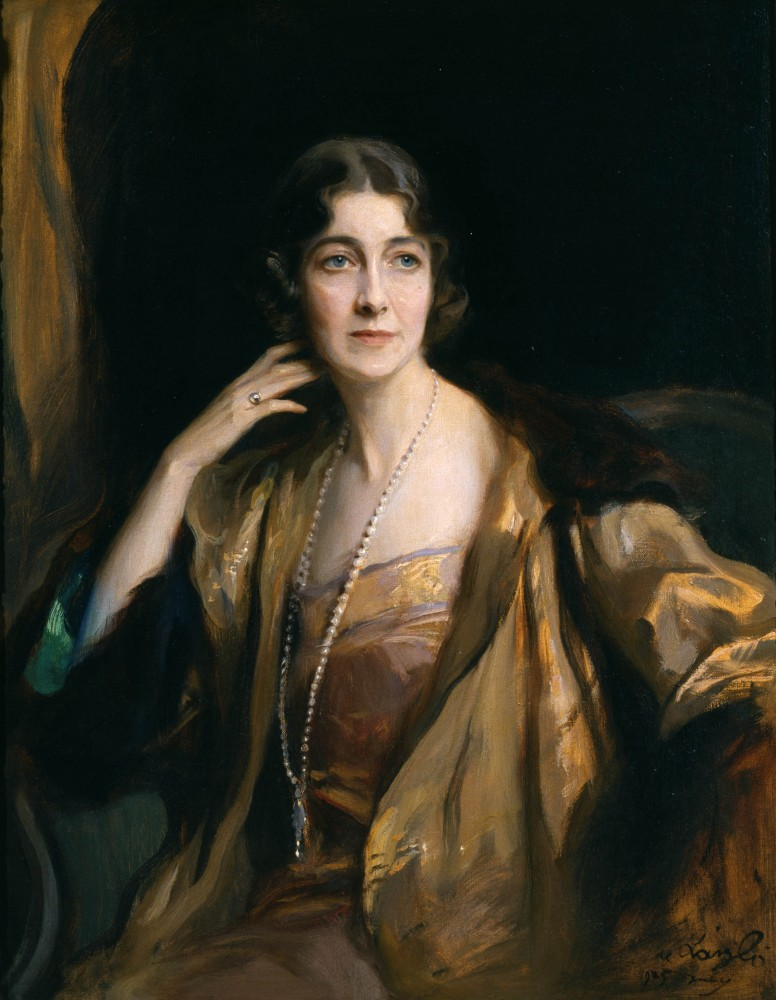
Portrait of his wife, Lady Ruby, by Philip de László, 1925

On 4 April 1908, Lord Cromer married Lady Ruby Elliot-Murray-Kynynmound (1886–1961), a daughter of Gilbert Elliot-Murray-Kynynmound, 4th Earl of Minto and Lady Mary Grey. Together, they had three children:

- Lady Rosemary Ethel Baring (1908–2004), who married Lt.-Col. J.D. Hills and had issue.
- Lady Violet Mary Baring (b. 1911), who married Maj. Mervyn Vernon.
- George Rowland Stanley Baring, 3rd Earl of Cromer (1918–1991), who married the Hon. Esmé Mary Gabriel Harmsworth (1922–2011) in 1942, daughter of Esmond Harmsworth, 2nd Viscount Rothermere.

Lord Cromer died in London on 13 May 1953. His widow, then the dowager Lady Cromer, died on 5 November 1961.

== Media depictions ==
In the 2005 film Mrs Henderson Presents, Cromer is portrayed by actor Christopher Guest. In the Downton Abbey 2013 Christmas Special, he is portrayed, wearing Order of the Garter insignia despite not having been a Knight Companion of the Order of the Garter, by the series' historical consultant, Alastair Bruce.

== Sources ==
- Debrett's peerage, and titles of courtesy. London: Dean. 1921. pp. 256−257.
- Gale (29 December 1922). "Obituary: Mr. Windham Baring". The Times. No. 43225. pp. 11–12. Gale CS186192797.
- Owen, Roger (2004). Lord Cromer: Victorian Imperialist, Edwardian Proconsul. Oxford University Press. ISBN 0-19-925338-2.

Court offices
Preceded by The Duke of Atholl	Lord Chamberlain; 1922–1938	Succeeded by The Earl of Clarendon
Peerage of the United Kingdom
Preceded by Evelyn Baring	Earl of Cromer; 1917–1953	Succeeded by George Rowland Stanley Baring
