= Rowland Baring, 3rd Earl of Cromer =

British banker and diplomat

Lieutenant-Colonel The Right Honourable The Earl of Cromer KG GCMG MBE PC

British Ambassador to the United States
- In office 1971–1974
- Monarch: Elizabeth II
- Prime Minister: Edward Heath; Harold Wilson
- Preceded by: John Freeman
- Succeeded by: Peter Ramsbotham

Governor of the Bank of England
- In office 1 July 1961 – 30 June 1966
- Preceded by: The Lord Cobbold
- Succeeded by: Sir Leslie O'Brien

Member of the House of Lords
- Lord Temporal
- In office 13 May 1953 – 16 March 1991
- Preceded by: The 2nd Earl of Cromer
- Succeeded by: The 4th Earl of Cromer

Personal details
- Born: George Rowland Stanley Baring; 28 July 1918
- Died: 16 March 1991 (aged 72) London, England
- Spouse: Esmé Mary Gabriel Harmsworth (m. 1942)
- Children: 3, including Evelyn
- Parent: Rowland Baring, 2nd Earl of Cromer (father)
- Education: Trinity College, Cambridge
- Occupation: Banker, diplomat
- Awards: Knight Companion of the Order of the Garter; Knight Grand Cross of the Order of St Michael and St George; Member of the Order of the British Empire
- Military career
- Allegiance: United Kingdom
- Branch: British Army
- Service years: 1938–1948
- Rank: Lieutenant Colonel
- Service number: 87193
- Unit: Grenadier Guards
- Conflicts: Second World War

Lieutenant Colonel George Rowland Stanley Baring, 3rd Earl of Cromer (28 July 1918 – 16 March 1991), styled Viscount Errington before 1953, was a British banker and diplomat. After serving during the Second World War, he was Governor of the Bank of England (1961–1966) and British Ambassador to the United States (1971–1974).

== Early life and military career ==
A member of the Baring family and the eldest son of the 2nd Earl of Cromer and his wife Ruby Elliot-Murray-Kynynmound, he was educated at Eton and Trinity College, Cambridge, where he left after a year. He served with the Grenadier Guards during the Second World War, where he gained the rank of Lieutenant-Colonel and became a Member of the Order of the British Empire.

== Banking and diplomatic career ==
After serving as private secretary to Freeman Freeman-Thomas, 1st Marquess of Willingdon, in 1938, he joined Barings Bank, founded by his ancestor Sir Francis Baring, as a clerk. After military service during the war, he was managing director of Barings between 1949 and 1959. He then served as Economic Minister at the British Embassy in Washington as well as holding executive directorships at the International Monetary Fund, the International Bank for Reconstruction and Development, and the International Finance Corporation.

He was appointed Governor of the Bank of England in 1961, a position he held until 1966. During his governorship he clashed with the incoming Labour Prime Minister Harold Wilson over Cromer's desire to see government spending contained, which may have contributed to his decision not to seek a second term. Cromer was subsequently appointed to the Privy Council. He was responsible for the Cromer Report into Lloyd's of London.

From 1971 to 1974, he served as British Ambassador to the United States. Following his appointment he became a Knight Commander of the Order of St Michael and St George, and was raised to the rank of Knight Grand Cross in 1974. He was a Governor of the pro-NATO Atlantic Institute and a member of the Pilgrims Society executive committee.

In 1977, he was made a Knight Companion of the Garter.

== Personal life ==
Cromer married the Hon. Esmé Mary Gabriel Harmsworth (1922–2011) in 1942, daughter of Esmond Harmsworth, 2nd Viscount Rothermere.

They had three children:

- Lady Lana Mary Gabriel (1943–1974);
- Evelyn Rowland Esmond (born 1946), who succeeded as 4th Earl of Cromer; and
- Hon. Vivian John Rowland (born 1950), married his second cousin Lavinia Baring.

Both the Countess of Cromer and her daughter-in-law were royal attendants. Esmé Harmsworth was a Lady of the Bedchamber to Queen Elizabeth II, while Lavinia Baring was a Lady-in-Waiting to Diana, Princess of Wales.

In 1964, during the period he was at the Bank of England, Cromer purchased a Fairey Huntsman 28 sports cruiser from Fairey Marine, Hamble. Bearing the name Le Reve, the vessel was taken to France. The boat still exists, and details can be seen on the Fairey Owners Club website.

The 3rd Earl died on 16 March 1991 in London. The Countess remarried in 1993 to Gerrit van der Woude.

== Arms ==
Coat of arms of Lt. Col. Rowland Baring, 3rd Earl of Cromer, KG, GCMG, MBE, PC
Coronet An Earl's Coronet Crest Between wings conjoined in base Argent a mullet Erminois. Escutcheon Azure on a fess Or an escallop Azure for difference in chief a bear's head couped proper muzzled and ringed Or. Supporters Two bears proper muzzled Or that to the dexter collared checky Argent and Azure and charged on the shoulder with a lion's head erased Or that to the sinister collared gemel and charged on the shoulder with an escallop Or. Motto PROBITATE ET LABORE

== Footnotes ==
Court offices
Preceded by Jock Colville	Page of Honour; 1931–1935	Succeeded by George Seymour
Government offices
Preceded by The Lord Cobbold	Governor of the Bank of England; 1961–1966	Succeeded by Sir Leslie O'Brien
Diplomatic posts
Preceded by John Freeman	British Ambassador to the United States; 1971–1974	Succeeded by Sir Peter Ramsbotham
Peerage of the United Kingdom
Preceded by Rowland Baring	Earl of Cromer; 1953–1991; Member of the House of Lords (1953–1991)	Succeeded by Evelyn Baring
Preceded by Rowland Baring	Viscount Cromer; 1953–1991	Succeeded by Evelyn Baring
Preceded by Rowland Baring	Baron Cromer; 1953–1991	Succeeded by Evelyn Baring
