= Francis Baring, 1st Baron Northbrook =

British politician (1796–1866)

The Right Honourable The Lord Northbrook PC FRS
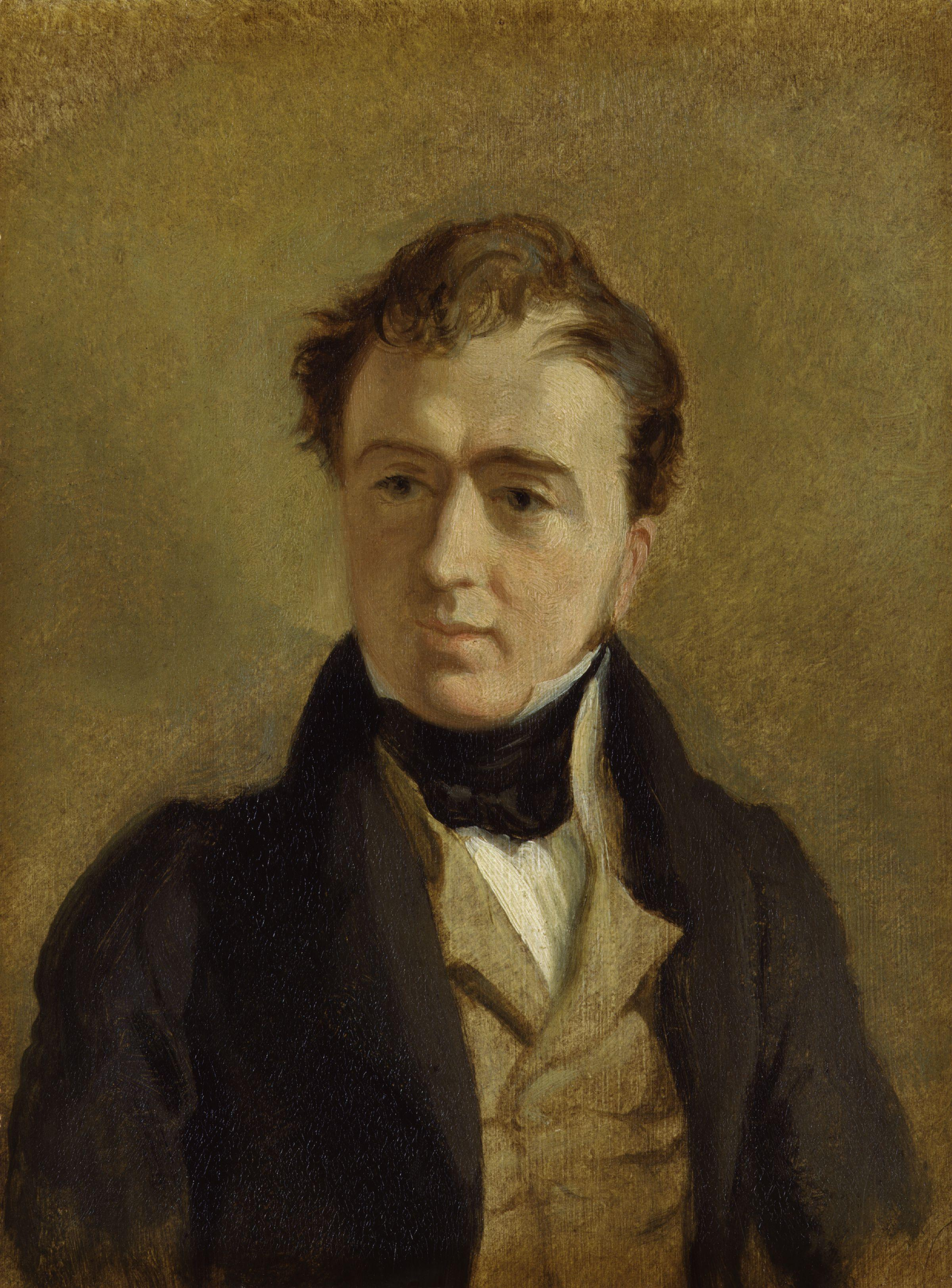
- Portrait by Sir George Hayter, c. 1833

Chancellor of the Exchequer
- In office 26 August 1839 – 30 August 1841
- Monarch: Victoria
- Prime Minister: The Viscount Melbourne
- Preceded by: Thomas Spring Rice
- Succeeded by: Henry Goulburn

First Lord of the Admiralty
- In office 1849 – 28 February 1852
- Preceded by: The Earl of Auckland
- Succeeded by: The Duke of Northumberland

Financial Secretary to the Treasury
- In office 6 June 1834 – 14 November 1834
- Preceded by: Thomas Spring Rice
- Succeeded by: Vacant
- In office 21 April 1835 – 26 August 1839
- Preceded by: Sir Thomas Fremantle
- Succeeded by: Robert Gordon

Personal details
- Born: 20 April 1796 Calcutta, India
- Died: 6 September 1866 (aged 70) Micheldever, Hampshire
- Party: Liberal; Whig (before 1859)
- Spouses: Jane Grey (m. 1825; died 1838); Lady Arabella Howard (m. 1841)
- Education: Christ Church, Oxford

Francis Thornhill Baring, 1st Baron Northbrook, PC, FRS (20 April 1796 – 6 September 1866), known as Sir Francis Baring, 3rd Baronet, from 1848 to 1866, was a British Whig politician who served in the governments of Lord Melbourne and Lord John Russell.

== Early life ==
A member of the famous Baring banking family, he was the eldest son of Sir Thomas Baring, 2nd Baronet, and his wife Mary Ursula Sealy, eldest daughter of Charles Sealy.

Baring was educated at Winchester College and then Eton College. He obtained a double first-class degree from Christ Church, Oxford, in 1817, and graduated with a Master of Arts four years later. In 1818, he was commissioned as a Captain in the disembodied North Hampshire Militia, but resigned in 1825. In 1823, he was called to the Bar at Lincoln's Inn and in 1848, he succeeded his father as baronet.

== Political career ==
Baring entered the British House of Commons in 1826, sitting as a Member of Parliament for Portsmouth until his retirement in 1865. A year later, he was raised to the Peerage of the United Kingdom as Baron Northbrook. Baring was appointed Lord of the Treasury in 1830, a post he held for the next four years, until June 1834. In 1831, Baring was appointed to serve on the Government Commission upon Emigration, which was wound up in 1832.

He was a Secretary to the Treasury until November 1834, and he reassumed this office between 1835 and 1839. Subsequently, Baring was sworn into the Privy Council and joined the cabinet as Chancellor of the Exchequer, serving until the fall of the Melbourne government in August 1841. He returned to the cabinet in January 1849, replacing Lord Auckland as First Lord of the Admiralty in Russell's cabinet, until its fall in 1852.

Baring was a member of the Canterbury Association. He met John Robert Godley on 24 November 1849 to discuss educational matters for the proposed settlement in Canterbury, New Zealand, and provided £600 for education as a memorial to Charles Buller, who had died the previous year.

== Personal life ==
Lord Northbrook was twice married. Firstly, on 7 April 1825, at the Dockyard Chapel, in Portsmouth, Lord Northbrook married Jane Grey (1804–1838), daughter of Sir George Grey, 1st Baronet, and niece of Charles Grey, 2nd Earl Grey. They were the parents of:

- Hon. Mary Baring (d. 1906), who married John Bonham-Carter, son of John Bonham-Carter.
- Thomas George Baring (1826–1904), who married Elizabeth Sturt, daughter of Henry Sturt and sister of Lord Alington.

Secondly, in 1841, he married Lady Arabella Georgina Howard (1809–1884) at St George's, Hanover Square. Lady Arabella was the second daughter of Kenneth Howard, 1st Earl of Effingham. They were the parents of:

- Hon. Francis Henry Baring (1850–1915), who married Lady Grace Boyle, daughter of Richard Boyle, 9th Earl of Cork.

Lord Northbrook died on 6 September 1866, aged 70, and was succeeded by his son from his first marriage, Thomas, who was later created Earl of Northbrook in 1876. Lady Northbrook died in December 1884, at the age of 75.

== Honours ==
- Baring Bay on western Devon Island in the Canadian Arctic is named in his honour.

Parliament of the United Kingdom
Preceded by John Markham; John Bonham-Carter	Member of Parliament for Portsmouth; 1826–1865; With: John Bonham-Carter 1826–1838; Sir George Staunton, Bt 1838–1852; The Viscount Monck 1852–1857; Sir James Dalrymple-Horn-Elphinstone 1857–1865	Succeeded by William Henry Stone; Stephen Gaselee
Political offices
Preceded by Thomas Spring Rice	Chancellor of the Exchequer; 1839–1841	Succeeded by Henry Goulburn
Preceded by The Earl of Auckland	First Lord of the Admiralty; 1849–1852	Succeeded by The Duke of Northumberland
Peerage of the United Kingdom
New creation	Baron Northbrook; 1866	Succeeded by Thomas Baring
Baronetage of the United Kingdom
Preceded by Thomas Baring	Baronet (Baring of Larkbeare, Devon); 1848–1866	Succeeded by Thomas Baring
