= Henry Baring =

British politician and banker (1777–1848)

Member of Parliament for Colchester
- In office 1820–1826 Serving with James Beckford Wildman
- Preceded by: James Beckford Wildman; Daniel Whittle Harvey
- Succeeded by: Daniel Whittle Harvey; Sir George Smyth, Bt

Member of Parliament for Bossiney
- In office 1806–1807 Serving with James Stuart-Wortley
- Preceded by: James Stuart-Wortley; George Peter Holford
- Succeeded by: James Stuart-Wortley; Peter Thellusson

Personal details
- Born: 18 January 1777
- Died: 13 April 1848 (aged 71)
- Spouses: Maria Matilda Bingham (m. 1802; div. 1824) Cecilia Anne Windham (after 1825)
- Relations: See Baring family
- Children: Henry Bingham Baring; Tom Baring; Edward Baring, 1st Baron Revelstoke; Evelyn Baring, 1st Earl of Cromer; William Frederick Baring
- Parent(s): Sir Francis Baring, 1st Baronet; Harriet Herring

Henry Baring (18 January 1777 – 13 April 1848) was a British banker and politician. He was the third son of Sir Francis Baring, 1st Baronet, the founder of the family banking firm that grew into Barings Bank. His grandfather Johann Baring emigrated from Germany and established the family in England.

== Early life ==
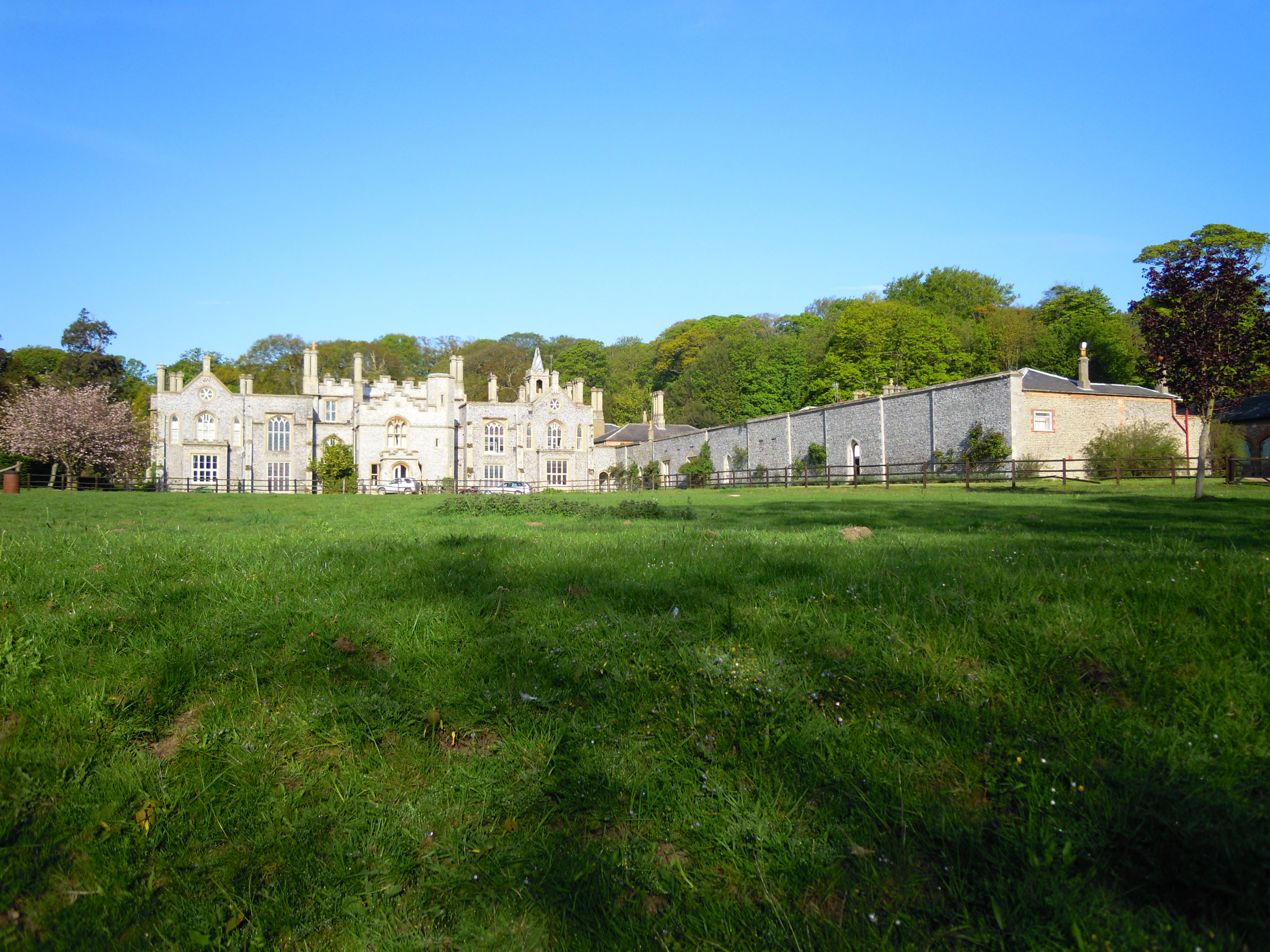
Cromer Hall, Norfolk, the seat of Henry Baring.

Henry Baring was a member of the Baring family, and the third of five sons of Sir Francis Baring, 1st Baronet, and Harriet, daughter of William Herring. Sir Thomas Baring, 2nd Baronet, and Alexander Baring, 1st Baron Ashburton, were his elder brothers.

== Career ==
Henry, along with his older brothers Thomas and Alexander, became partners in the firm in 1804. Less interested in banking than his brothers, Henry retired from partnership in 1823. He also sat as member of parliament for Bossiney from 1806 to 1807, and for Colchester from 1820 to 1826.

== Personal life ==
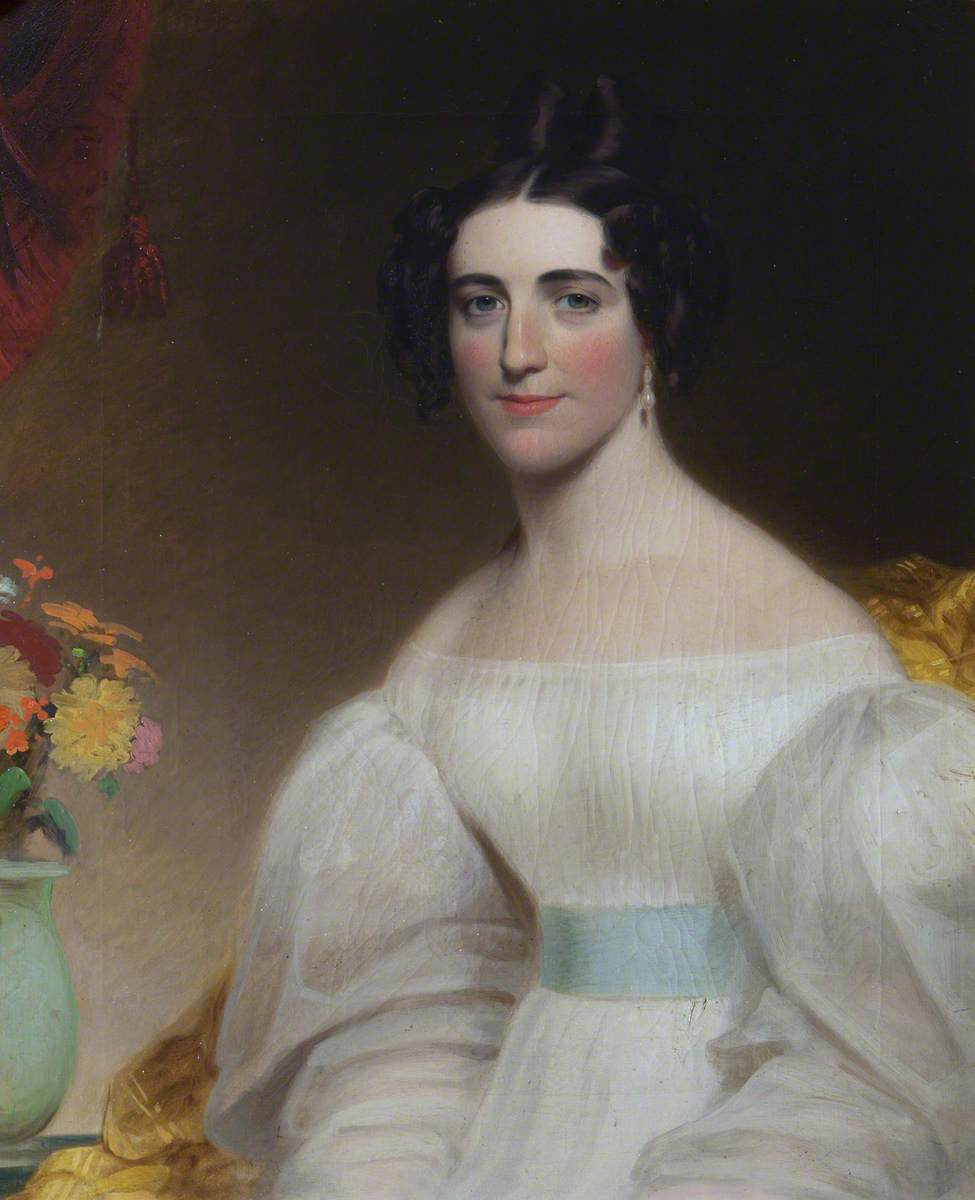
Portrait of his second wife, Cecilia, by William Edward West

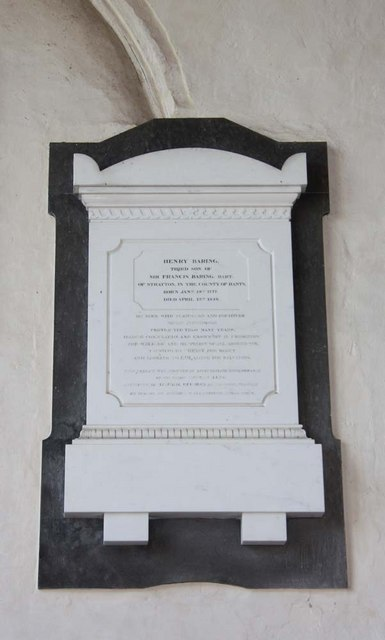
Memorial in St Margaret's Church, Felbrigg

Baring was twice married. He married firstly Maria Matilda Bingham, daughter of U.S. Senator William Bingham (his brother Alexander also married a Bingham daughter) and former wife of James Alexander, Comte de Tilly, in 1802. They had three sons and two daughters, including:

- Anna Maria Baring (b. 1803), who married William Gordon Coesvelt.
- Henry Bingham Baring (1804–1869), MP for Callington and Marlborough who married Lady Augusta Brudenell, a daughter of Robert Brudenell, 6th Earl of Cardigan, in 1827.
- James Drummond Baring (1806–1901)
- Frances Emily Baring (1813–1886), who married Henry Bridgeman Simpson in 1830.
- William Frederick Baring (1822–1903), who married Emily Jenkins, daughter of Sir Richard Jenkins (chairman of the East India Company), in 1845.

He divorced Maria in 1824, and married Cecilia Anne Windham, daughter of Vice-Admiral William Lukin Windham, in 1825, through which marriage Cromer Hall came into the family. They had at least seven sons and one daughter, including:

- William Windham Baring (1826–1876), who married Selina Ponsonby, daughter of Maj.-Gen. Hon. Sir Frederick Ponsonby and Lady Emily Bathurst (a daughter of the 3rd Earl Bathurst), in 1862.
- Edward Charles Baring, 1st Baron Revelstoke (1828–1897), who married Louisa Bulteel, daughter of John Crocker Bulteel, MP, and Lady Elizabeth Grey (a daughter of the 2nd Earl Grey), in 1861.
- Robert Baring (1833–1915), a Col. in the 19th Hussars who died unmarried.
- Richard Baring (1833–1883), who died without issue.
- Cecilia Annetta Baring (c. 1834–1911), who married Charles Harbord, 5th Baron Suffield, in 1854.
- Thomas Baring (1839–1923), who married Constance Barron, daughter of Capt. William Barron, in 1901.
- Evelyn Baring, 1st Earl of Cromer (1841–1917), who married Ethel Errington, daughter of Sir Rowland Errington, 11th Baronet, in 1876. After her death, he married Lady Katherine Thynne, daughter of John Thynne, 4th Marquess of Bath, in 1901.
- Walter Baring (1844–1915), Consul-General to Uruguay who married Ellen Guarracino, daughter of Frederick Guarracino, in 1875

Several of his children and descendants gained distinction. His eldest son from his first marriage, Henry Bingham Baring, was a politician, father of Lieutenant-General Charles Baring and grandfather of Sir Godfrey Baring, 1st Baronet. His second son from his second marriage was Edward Baring, 1st Baron Revelstoke, whose fifth son was the man-of-letters Maurice Baring. His sixth son from his second marriage was Evelyn Baring, 1st Earl of Cromer.

Baring died in April 1848. His second wife died in October 1874, aged 71.

Parliament of the United Kingdom
Preceded by James Stuart-Wortley; George Peter Holford	Member of Parliament for Bossiney; 1806–1807; With: James Stuart-Wortley	Succeeded by James Stuart-Wortley; Peter Thellusson
Preceded by James Beckford Wildman; Daniel Whittle Harvey	Member of Parliament for Colchester; 1820–1826; With: James Beckford Wildman	Succeeded by Daniel Whittle Harvey; Sir George Smyth, Bt
