= Tom Baring =

British banker (1839–1923)

Thomas "Tom" Baring
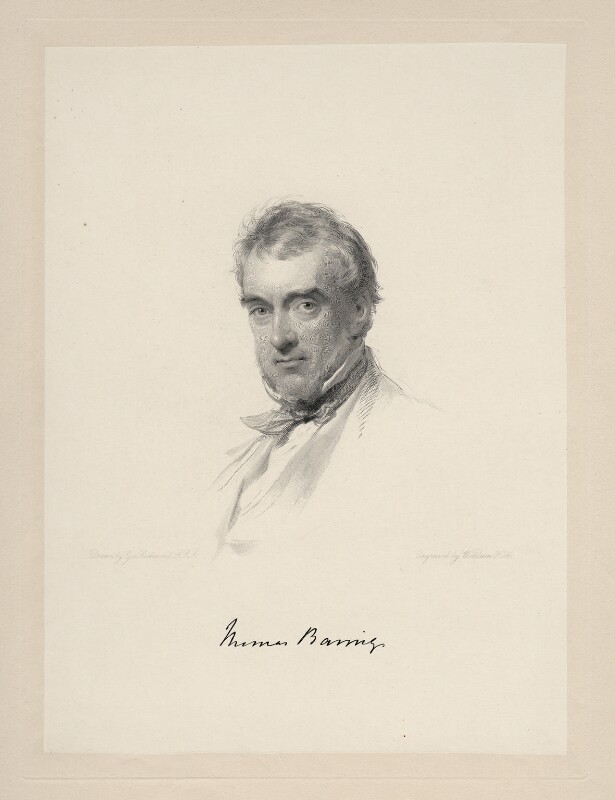
- Thomas Baring, by William Holl Jr., after George Richmond, 1861
- Born: 21 March 1839; Cromer Hall, Cromer, Norfolk, England
- Died: 4 June 1923 (aged 84); Newmarket, Suffolk
- Spouse: Constance Barron (m. 1901)
- Children: 2
- Parent(s): Henry Baring; Cecilia Anne Windham
- Relatives: Edward Baring, 1st Baron Revelstoke (brother); Evelyn Baring, 1st Earl of Cromer (brother); Henry Bingham Baring (half-brother)

Thomas Baring (21 March 1839 – 4 June 1923) was a British banker.

== Early life ==
Baring was born on 21 March 1839 at Cromer Hall, Cromer, Norfolk into the Baring family. Known as "Tom", he was the tenth child (fifth of second marriage) of Henry Baring and the former Cecilia Anne Windham. His father was first married, and divorced, to Maria Matilda Bingham (a daughter of U.S. Senator William Bingham who was the former wife of Jacques-Pierre-Alexandre, Comte de Tilly). Among his siblings were elder half-brother Henry Bingham Baring, MP for Callington and Marlborough, and younger brothers, Edward, raised to the peerage as 1st Baron Revelstoke, and Evelyn, who inherited Cromer Hall and was raised to the peerage as 1st Earl of Cromer.

His paternal grandparents were Sir Francis Baring, 1st Baronet, and the former Harriet Herring (a daughter of William Herring). His maternal grandparents were Vice-Admiral William Lukin Windham and Anne Thellusson (daughter of Genevan banker Peter Thellusson).

== Career ==
Like his brother, he was involved in the family banking business, beginning his career in the Liverpool office of Barings Bank. He later moved to New York City to join Kidder Peabody. When, in 1890, Kidder Peabody split its dual Boston-New York firm, Baring became a partner in the separated New York firm. He and another Kidder-Peabody alumnus, George C. Magoun, formed Baring, Magoun & Co. of New York. Both houses continued as North American agents for Barings.

Following the near-collapse of Barings, which initiated the Panic of 1890, and the death of senior partner Thomas Charles Baring (a cousin) in 1891, Tom returned to London to become a Managing Director of the reorganized Baring Brothers and Co. Limited in 1892. In 1896 he joined the new Barings partnership formed to oversee the limited company. He remained in both positions until his retirement in 1912. Although Tom was the eldest of the partners, his nephew John Baring, 2nd Baron Revelstoke became head of the firm.

== Personal life ==
In 1901, Baring was married to heiress Constance Barron, daughter of William Barron and Fanny Louisa Lonergan. Her sister, Agnes Barron, had married Baron Alexandre de Stoeckl in 1892, and became lady in waiting to Princess Maria of Greece and Denmark. Together, they were the parents of:

- Richard Baring (1902–1940), who married Violetta Archer, a niece of Lord George Dundas, in 1922. After her death in a flying accident in 1931, he married Margaret Sutton, daughter of Dr. Henry Thomas Sutton, in 1932.
- Edward Thomas Baring (1903–1980), who married heiress Virginia Ryan, a daughter of John Barry Ryan and granddaughter of Thomas Fortune Ryan, in 1926. She was aunt to Virginia Ogilvy, Countess of Airlie. They divorced in 1949 and he married Pauline Alison (née Copland) Boden, daughter of Frank Fawcett Copland and former wife of Timothy Boden, in 1950. Virginia married Albert J. Beveridge Jr. (son of U.S. Senator Albert J. Beveridge and Catherine Eddy) in 1955.

Baring died at Newmarket, Suffolk on 4 June 1923. His widow died on 3 July 1948.
