= Francis Baring, 6th Baron Northbrook =

British peer and politician

The Right Honourable The Lord Northbrook FRGS
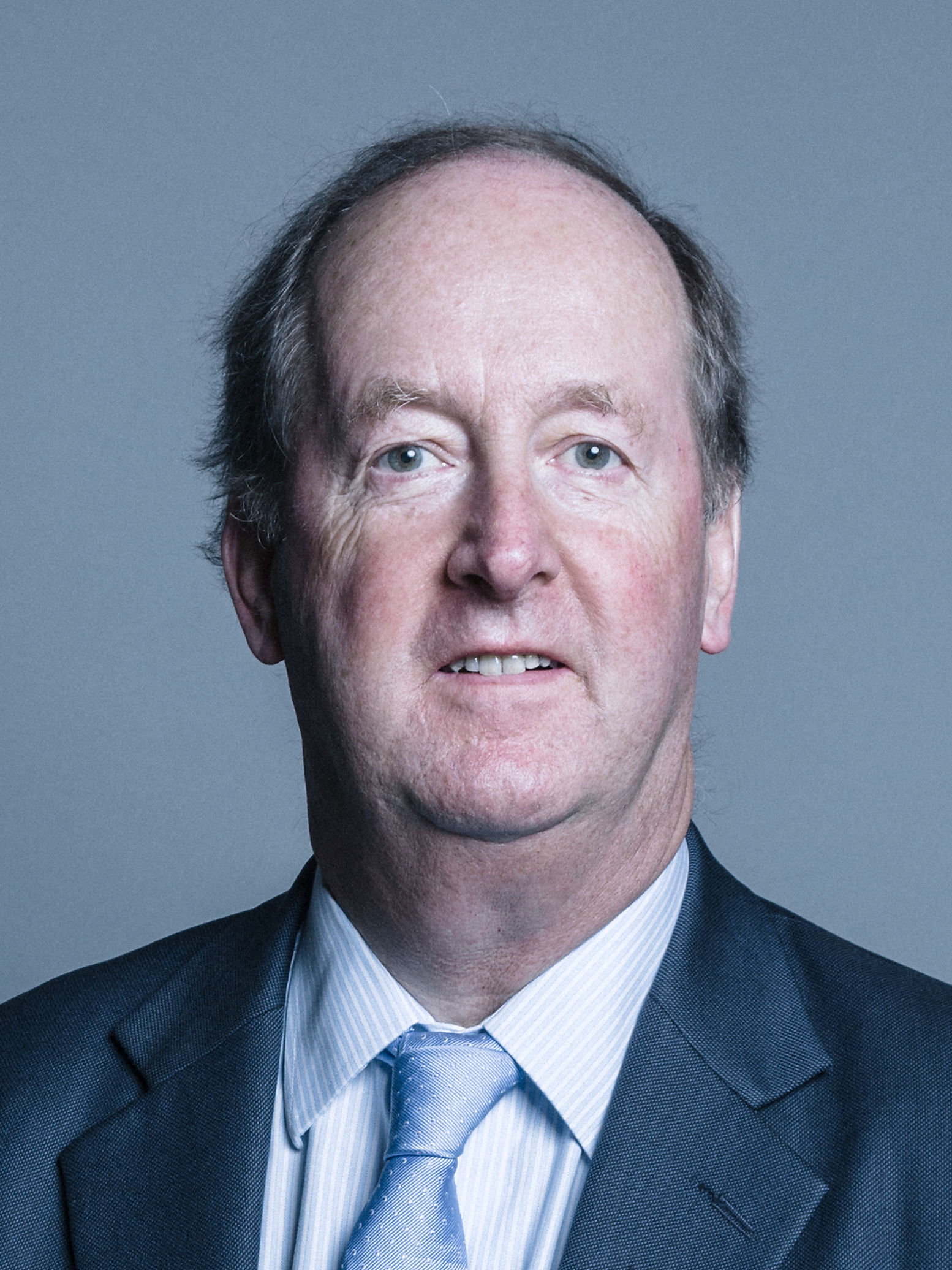

Member of the House of Lords
- Lord Temporal
- Hereditary peerage 23 September 1991 – 11 November 1999
- Preceded by: The 5th Baron Northbrook
- Succeeded by: Seat abolished
- Elected Hereditary Peer; 11 November 1999 – 29 April 2026
- Election: 1999
- Preceded by: Seat established
- Succeeded by: Seat abolished

Personal details
- Born: 21 February 1954 (age 72)
- Party: Conservative

Francis Thomas Baring, 6th Baron Northbrook (born 21 February 1954), is a British peer and Conservative politician.

The son of Francis Baring, 5th Baron Northbrook, and Rowena Margaret Manning, Northbrook was educated at Winchester College, and took a BA in history at the University of Bristol. In 1976 he joined Dixon Wilson & Co as a trainee chartered accountant. In 1981 he became a credit analyst at Baring Brothers & Co. In 1983, he moved into Baring Investment Management as an investment analyst. In 1985 he moved to Baring's Private Client Department. He became a Senior Investment Manager at Taylor Young Investment in 1990, and at Smith and Williamson Securities in 1993. He co-founded Mars Asset Management in 1996.

Lord Northbrook took his seat in the House of Lords on the death of his father in 1990. He was one of the 92 hereditary peers who remain in the House of Lords after the House of Lords Act of 1999. He since resisted further reform of the Lords, tabling amendments to a draft bill to abolish by-elections for hereditary peers, proposed by Lord Grocott in 2018. Lord Northbrook sat on the Conservative benches and was an Opposition Whip in the House of Lords from 1999 to 2000. He spoke on treasury, constitutional, and agricultural matters.

He is a founding trustee of the Fortune Forum Charity which in its first year raised over £1 million for Global Poverty, Global Health, and Climate Change Charities.

He is a member of the advisory board of the Iman Foundation which aims to promote dialogue to strengthen international understanding and co-existence through the exchange of ideas, people, culture and religion.

== Private life ==
In 1987, Lord Northbrook married Amelia Sarah Elizabeth Taylor. They have three daughters, but were divorced in 2006. In 2013, Lord Northbrook married Charlotte Pike, the publisher and editor of the Almanach de Gotha.

There is no heir to the barony of Northbrook. His heir in the Baring baronetcy of Larkbeer is his fourth cousin Peter Baring of Dower Cottage, Arlington, Oxfordshire.

Lord Northbrook's home in Hampshire was destroyed by fire on 4 December 2005. One hundred firefighters were at the scene (with the swimming pool being used as a water store) in an attempt to salvage Lord Northbrook's personal belongings. Some art was saved and later sold to Hans-Adam II, Prince of Liechtenstein, as a consequence of the divorce.

His main hobbies are shooting, cricket, fishing, and skiing. He is a Fellow of the Royal Geographical Society: his clubs are White's, Pratt's, the Beefsteak, and the Worshipful Company of Gunmakers.

== Notes ==
Peerage of the United Kingdom
| Preceded by Francis Baring | Baron Northbrook; 1990–present Member of the House of Lords (1991–1999) | Incumbent; Heir: none |
Baronetage of Great Britain
| Preceded by Francis Baring | Baronet of Larkbeer; 1990–present | Incumbent; Heir presumptive: Peter Baring |
Parliament of the United Kingdom
| New office created by the House of Lords Act 1999 | Elected hereditary peer to the House of Lords under the House of Lords Act 1999; 1999–2026 | Office abolished under the House of Lords (Hereditary Peers) Act 2026 |
