= Henry Bingham Baring =

British politician (1804–1869)

- Born: 4 March 1804
- Died: 25 April 1869 (aged 65)
- Occupation: Politician
- Parent(s): Henry Baring; Maria Matilda Bingham
- Relatives: See Baring family

Henry Bingham Baring (4 March 1804 – 25 April 1869) was a British Conservative Party politician. He was the son of Henry Baring and Maria Matilda Bingham, daughter of American-born statesman William Bingham. Bingham was a half-brother of Evelyn Baring, 1st Earl of Cromer and a member of the distinguished Baring family.

He entered the House of Commons in 1831 as Member of Parliament for the rotten borough of Callington in Cornwall. When Callington was disenfranchised the following year, he was returned for the Marlborough constituency in Wiltshire, and held his seat until 1868.

He was the grandfather of Godfrey Baring, and great-grandfather of Poppy Baring, one of the famous Bright young things of the 1920s British avant-garde society.

== See also ==
- Baron Ashburton

Parliament of the United Kingdom
Preceded by William Bingham Baring; Alexander Baring	Member of Parliament for Callington; 1831–1832; With: Edward Herbert	Constituency abolished
Preceded by Thomas Sotheron-Estcourt; William Bankes	Member of Parliament for Marlborough; 1832–1868; With: Lord Ernest Brudenell-Bruce	Succeeded by Lord Ernest Brudenell-Bruce (Representation reduced - no second MP)
Political offices
Preceded by Thomas Wyse; Henry Tufnell; Edward Horsman; William Francis Cowper	Junior Lord of the Treasury; 1841–1846	Succeeded by Viscount Ebrington; The O'Conor Don; Sir William Gibson Craig, Bt; Henry Rich
