= Evelyn Baring, 4th Earl of Cromer =

British peer and businessman (born 1946)

The Right Honourable The Earl of Cromer

Member of the House of Lords
- Lord Temporal
- as a hereditary peer 16 March 1991 – 11 November 1999
- Preceded by: The 3rd Earl of Cromer
- Succeeded by: Seat abolished (Note: Pursuant to the House of Lords Act 1999.)

Personal details
- Born: Evelyn Rowland Esmond Baring; 3 June 1946 (age 79)
- Spouse(s): Plern Isangkul Na Ayuddya (m. 1971; div. 1992) Shelley Hu Cheng-Yu (m. 1993; div. 2019) Jiraporn Buengman (m. 2022)
- Children: 2
- Parent: Rowland Baring, 3rd Earl of Cromer (father)
- Occupation: Peer, businessman

Evelyn Rowland Esmond Baring, 4th Earl of Cromer (born 3 June 1946), styled Viscount Errington from 1953 to 1991, is a British peer and businessman. He was managing director of Inchcape (China) Ltd. and a director of Schroder Asia Pacific Fund PLC. As Earl of Cromer, he was a member of the House of Lords from 1991 to 1999.

== Background ==
The son of Rowland Baring, 3rd Earl of Cromer, and his wife Esmé Mary Gabrielle Harmsworth, a daughter of Esmond Harmsworth, 2nd Viscount Rothermere, he was educated at Eton College. He was managing director of Inchcape (China) Ltd. between 1979 and 1994 and a director of Schroder AsiaPacific Fund plc between 1995 and 2003.

In 1991 he succeeded his father as Earl of Cromer, Viscount Errington, Viscount Cromer, and Baron Cromer. As a member of the House of Lords from 1991 to 1999, he is not recorded as having ever spoken there.

On 25 October 1971, Baring married firstly Plern Isangkul Na Ayuddya, a daughter of Dr. Charanpat Isangkul Na Ayuddya. They were divorced in 1992. In 1993 he married secondly Shelley Hu Cheng-Yu, daughter of Hu Guo-qin, with whom he has two children:

- Alexander Rowland Harmsworth Baring, Viscount Errington (born 1994)
- Lady Venetia Baring (born 1998)

Baring and Hu were divorced in 2019. In 2022 Baring married Jiraporn Buengman. As of 2024, he lived in Bangkok.

== Notes ==
Peerage of the United Kingdom
| Preceded by Rowland Baring | Earl of Cromer; 1991–present Member of the House of Lords (1991–1999) | Incumbent; Heir apparent: Alexander Baring, Viscount Errington |
| Preceded by Rowland Baring | Viscount Cromer; 1991–present | Incumbent; Heir apparent: Alexander Baring, Viscount Errington |
| Preceded by Rowland Baring | Baron Cromer; 1991–present | Incumbent; Heir apparent: Alexander Baring, Viscount Errington |
