= Rupert Baring, 4th Baron Revelstoke =

British landowner and peer

The Right Honourable The Lord Revelstoke

Personal details
- Born: Rupert Alexander Baring; 8 February 1911 London, England
- Died: 18 July 1994 (aged 83) Dublin, Ireland
- Spouse: Hon. Florence Fermor-Hesketh (m. 1934; div. 1944)
- Relations: Edward Baring, 1st Baron Revelstoke (grandfather); Everard Baring (uncle); Maurice Baring (uncle); Patrick Pollen (nephew); Albert Spencer, 7th Earl Spencer (cousin)
- Parent(s): Cecil Baring, 3rd Baron Revelstoke; Maude Lorillard Tailer
- Education: Trinity College, Cambridge

Rupert Alexander Baring, 4th Baron Revelstoke (8 February 1911 – 18 July 1994) was a British landowner and peer.

== Early life ==
Baring was born in London on 8 February 1911. He was the only son of Cecil Baring, 3rd Baron Revelstoke and Maude Louise (née Lorillard) Tailer. His parents met in New York, where his father was working for Kidder, Peabody & Co., which led his mother to divorce her first husband, Thomas Suffern Tailer (a son of Edward Neufville Tailer), who was one of his father's business partners. From his parents marriage, he had two sisters, Hon. Daphne Baring (wife of Arthur Joseph Lawrence Pollen, eldest son of Arthur Pollen and grandson of Sir Joseph Lawrence) and the Hon. Calypso Baring (wife of Guy Maynard Liddell).

From his mother's first marriage, he had an older half-brother, Lorillard Suffern Tailer, a polo player who married Catherine Harding, daughter of J. Horace Harding and granddaughter of Charles D. Barney, founder of the New York investment firm of Charles D. Barney & Co. (predecessor firm to Smith, Barney & Co.). His paternal grandparents were the former Louisa Emily Charlotte Bulteel (a daughter of John Crocker Bulteel, MP) and Edward Baring, 1st Baron Revelstoke, the senior partner in the family banking firm of Baring Brothers and Co. Among his large extended paternal family were uncles John Baring, 2nd Baron Revelstoke, the prominent banker, Brigadier-General Everard Baring and novelist and Russophile Maurice Baring. His maternal grandparents were American tobacco millionaire, Pierre Lorillard IV and Emily (née Taylor) Lorillard.

Baring attended Eton and Trinity College, Cambridge.

== Career ==
Revelstoke worked for two years with Baring Brothers in Liverpool and New York, where he socialized with Irving Berlin and Rodgers and Hammerstein. He wrote lyrics and verse, including a project of Aesop's Fables which was admired by his friend, Sir John Betjeman. Another close friend, filmmaker Michael Powell, wrote the screenplay for the film Black Narcissus while staying with Revelstoke at Lambay.

Upon his father's death in 1934, he succeeded as the fourth Baron Revelstoke. In the 1930s. Revelstoke served in the Territorial Army and "masterminded the collection and distribution of Red Cross parcels to be sent to prisoners of war" during World War II.

=== Lambay Island ===
In 1904, he father acquired Lambay Island, located in the Irish Sea. Rupert's godfather, Edwin Lutyens, was responsible for the restoration of the castle on the Island when his father owned it. After Rupert inherited the barony, and under his sixty year stewardship of the Island, Lord Revelstoke's established "a sanctuary for seabirds, an enclosed ecology, and largely unspoilt even while the capital has grown northwards, with housing and light industry spreading up into the country opposite Lambay."

== Personal life ==
While an undergraduate at Cambridge, he had a relationship with Angela Joyce, an actress and Miss England of 1930. When he broke off the "engagement", she sued him for breach of promise of marriage. Revelstoke "refused to settle and endured having his love letters read out in court and published in the newspapers." Joyce's suit, which generated significant press interest, was unsuccessful,

On 1 March 1934, Lord Revelstoke married Hon. Florence "Flora" Fermor-Hesketh, second daughter of Thomas Fermor-Hesketh, 1st Baron Hesketh and the former Florence Louisa Breckinridge (a daughter of John Witherspoon Breckinridge of San Francisco and granddaughter of John C. Breckinridge, former Vice President of the United States). Before their divorce in 1944, they were the parents of:

- John Baring, 5th Baron Revelstoke (1934–2003), who died without issue.
- James Cecil Baring, 6th Baron Revelstoke (1938–2012), who married twice and had four children.

After their divorce, Flora was remarried to Lt.-Cmdr. Derek Lawson of Passenham Manor before her death in 1971.

Lord Revelstoke died in Dublin on 18 July 1994 and was succeeded by his eldest son, John.

== In popular culture ==
The lawsuit against Revelstoke by Angela Joyce was depicted in the drama series The Duchess of Duke Street in 1977, where the character based on Revelstoke, Lord Haslemere, was played by the young Christopher Cazenove.

Peerage of the United Kingdom
Preceded by Cecil Baring	Baron Revelstoke; 1934–1994	Succeeded by John Baring
