= Maude Lorillard Baring =

American heiress

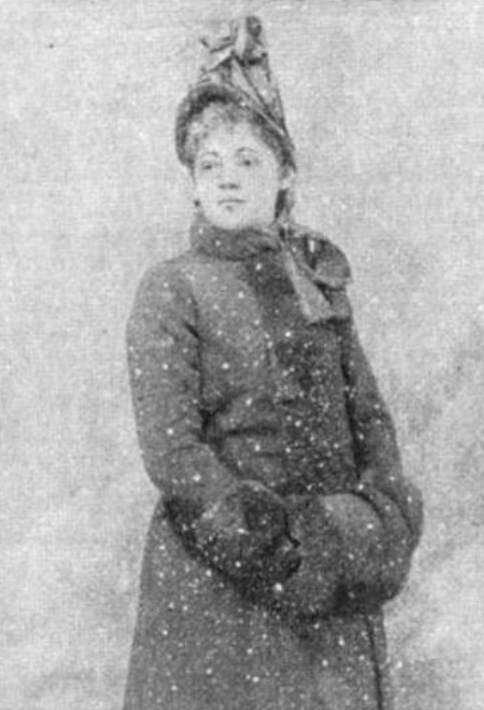
- Born: Maude Louise Lorillard; August 22, 1876; New York, New York, U.S.
- Died: April 2, 1922 (aged 45); London, U.K.
- Children: 4, including Rupert Baring, 4th Baron Revelstoke
- Father: Pierre Lorillard IV
- Relatives: Edward Neufville Tailer (father-in-law); Pierre Lorillard III (grandfather); Patrick Pollen (grandson)

Maude Louise Baring (née Lorillard, formerly Tailer; August 22, 1876 – April 2, 1922) was an American heiress who married into the British Baring banking family.

== Early life ==
Maude was born on August 22, 1873, in Manhattan. She was the youngest daughter of Pierre Lorillard IV and Emily (née Taylor) Lorillard.

Her paternal grandparents were Catherine (née Griswold) Lorillard and Pierre Lorillard III of the Lorillard Tobacco Company. Among her large extended family were aunts Mary Lorillard Barbey, Catherine Lorillard Kernochan, Eva Lorillard Kip and uncles Louis Lasher Lorillard and George L. Lorillard, who was also a prominent thoroughbred racehorse owner like her father. Her maternal grandparents were Isaac Ebenezer Taylor and Eliza Mary (née Mollan) Taylor.

== Personal life ==
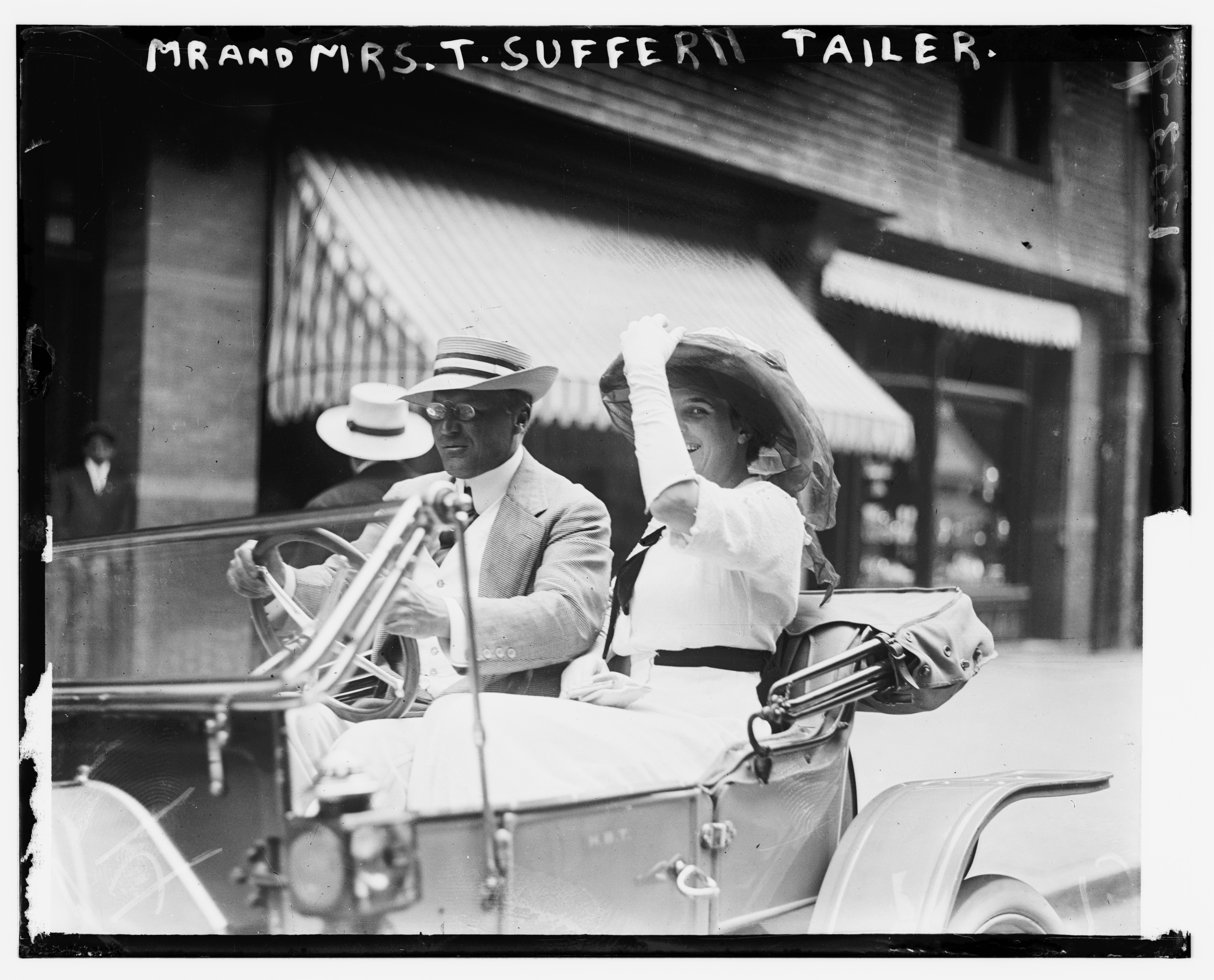
Mr. & Mrs. T. Suffern Tailer, 1900

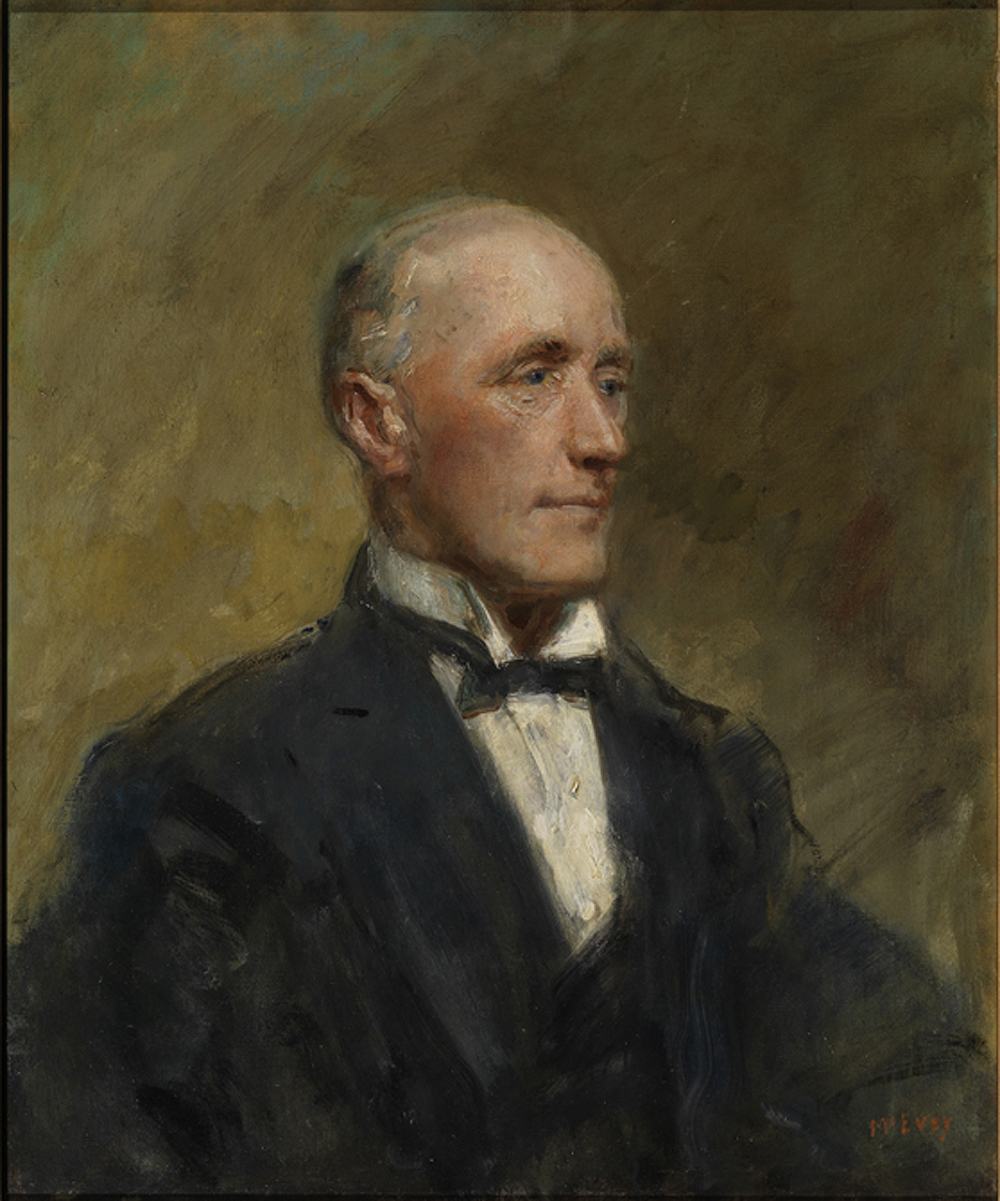
Portrait of her second husband, Cecil Baring, 3rd Baron Revelstoke, by Ambrose McEvoy

On April 15, 1893, she was married to Thomas Suffern Tailer (1866–1928) by the Rev. Dr. Henry Y. Satterlee at Calvary Church in New York City in what was considered "by far the most fashionable Easter season wedding" of the year. Suffern, as he was known, a son of Edward Neufville Tailer and Agnes (née Suffern) Tailer Before their divorce, they were the parents of:

- Lorillard Suffern Tailer (1897–1979), a polo player who married Catherine Harding (1900–1990), daughter of J. Horace Harding and granddaughter of Charles D. Barney, founder of the New York investment firm of Charles D. Barney & Co. (predecessor firm to Smith, Barney & Co.). They divorced, and he later married Esther Virginia Garlow (1918–1993).

While married to Tailer, she met the Hon. Cecil Baring, a British banker who was working in New York at Kidder, Peabody & Co. and was a business partner of her husband. The Tailer divorce, (Note: Her first husband remarried to Harriet Stewart Brown (1884–1953), a daughter of Alexander Brown and Bessie (née Montague) Brown (a first cousin of Wallis Simpson's mother), in 1909. After Tailer's death in 1928, Harriet married the investment banker and yachtsman C. Ledyard Blair.) and subsequent marriage, between Maude and Cecil in London in 1902, led to Baring's resignation from the American bank. Cecil was the third, but second surviving, son of Edward Baring, 1st Baron Revelstoke, and his sister Margaret was married to Charles Spencer, 6th Earl Spencer. In 1911, they returned to London and he was elected a director of the family firm, Baring Brothers and Co., later becoming head of the firm. Together, they were the parents of:

- Hon. Daphne Baring (1904–1986), who married Arthur Joseph Lawrence Pollen, eldest son of Arthur Pollen and grandson of Sir Joseph Lawrence, in 1920. They were the parents of Patrick Pollen.
- Hon. Calypso Baring (1905–1974), who married Guy Maynard Liddell, third son of Capt. Augustus Frederick Liddell, Comptroller and Treasurer to Prince Christian of Schleswig-Holstein (husband of Princess Helena of the United Kingdom) in 1926. They divorced in 1943.
- Rupert Alexander Baring, 4th Baron Revelstoke (1911–1994), who married Hon. Florence Flora Fermor-Hesketh, second daughter of Thomas Fermor-Hesketh, 1st Baron Hesketh and the former Florence Louisa Breckinridge (a daughter of John Witherspoon Breckinridge of San Francisco). They divorced in 1944 and she married Lt.-Cmdr. Derek Lawson of Passenham Manor.

Maude died on April 2, 1922, at Marylebone in London. She was buried at Lambay Island in Ireland. Her husband succeeded his unmarried elder brother John in 1929 and became the 3rd Baron Revelstoke. Upon his death in 1934, their only son, Rupert, succeeded to the barony.
