= John Baring, 5th Baron Revelstoke =

British landowner and aristocrat

John Baring, 5th Baron Revelstoke (2 December 1934 – 5 June 2003) was a British landowner and aristocrat who spent much of his life in Kenya.

== Early life ==
Baring was born on 2 December 1934. He was the elder son of Rupert Baring, 4th Baron Revelstoke, and his wife, the former Hon. Flora Fermor-Hesketh. His younger brother was the Hon. James Cecil Baring. His parents divorced and his mother remarried to Lt.-Cmdr. Derek Lawson of Passenham Manor. From his mother's later marriage, he had two younger half-sisters, Arabella Ann Spurrier (née Lawson), born 14 August 1946, and Caroline Flora Turner (née Lawson), born 23 September 1953.

His paternal grandparents were Cecil Baring, 3rd Baron Revelstoke and Maude Louise (née Lorillard) Tailer (youngest daughter of New Yorkers Pierre Lorillard IV and Emily (née Taylor) Lorillard). His maternal grandparents were Thomas Fermor-Hesketh, 1st Baron Hesketh and the former Florence Louisa Breckinridge (a daughter of John Witherspoon Breckinridge of San Francisco and granddaughter of John C. Breckinridge, former Vice President of the United States).

He was educated at Eton College.

== Career ==
Baring spent much of his life in Kenya, where he was a farmer, but also spent some time at Lambay Castle following his father's death.

He succeeded his father as the 5th Baron Revelstoke on 18 July 1994.

== Personal life ==
In 1979, Baring was married to Bridget Adrienne Rose (d. 1980), a daughter of Joseph Patrick Ring of Dublin.

His wife died in 1980 before he succeeded to the barony. Lord Revelstoke died, without issue, in Kenya, 5 June 2003, and was cremated at Nairobi. Upon his death, he was succeeded by his younger brother, James.

Peerage of the United Kingdom
Preceded by Rupert Alexander Baring	Baron Revelstoke; 1994–2003	Succeeded by James Cecil Baring
