= James Baring, 6th Baron Revelstoke =

British peer (1938–2012)

James Cecil Baring, 6th Baron Revelstoke (16 August 1938 – 7 February 2012) was a British peer.

== Early life ==
He was the second son of Rupert Baring, 4th Baron Revelstoke, and the former Hon. Flora Fermor-Hesketh (a daughter of the 1st Baron Hesketh). His great-grandfather was financier Edward Charles Baring, 1st Baron Revelstoke of Membland (1828–1897). His half-sisters, by a later marriage of his mother to Lt.-Cdr. Derek Lawson, are Arabella Ann Spurrier (née Lawson), born 14 August 1946, and Caroline Flora Turner (née Lawson), born 23 September 1953.

He was educated at Eton College, Eton, Berkshire.

== Career ==
From 1957 until 1959, Baring served in the National Service in the RAF, thereafter moving to London, where he lived until 1970. He summered on Lambay Island, located in the Irish Sea.

While in London, he bought the Regent Sound Studios located in London’s Tin Pan Alley and served as manager for the studio. At the studio, The Rolling Stones recorded their first album, the self-titled The Rolling Stones album, as well as The Beatles who recorded some tracks, including a song for their Sgt. Pepper's Lonely Hearts Club Band album. The Who, Tom Jones, and Roger Whittaker all recorded in the studio.

The studio was also used by those working in London’s West End theatre district, preparing songs for musical productions. Galt MacDermot, who composed the music for Hair, spent considerable time arranging the music for the production at the studio.

He succeeded his brother, John Baring, 5th Baron Revelstoke, born 2 December 1934, in 2003.

== Personal life ==
In 1968, he married Aneta Laline Dennis Fisher. They had two sons:

- Alexander Rupert Baring, born 9 April 1970, currently the 7th Baron Revelstoke.
- Thomas James Baring, born 4 December 1971.

In 1983, after his divorce from Aneta, he married Sarah Stubbs in 1983. Before their divorce, they had two daughters:

- Flora Aksinia Baring, born 17 July 1983, who worked at Hamish Dewar in London
- Miranda Louise Baring, born 1 May 1987, who studied the keyboard and vocals at the London School of Contemporary Music

He died aged 73 on 7 February 2012 and was succeeded by his son Alexander Rupert Baring.

== Arms ==
Coat of arms of James Baring, 6th Baron Revelstoke
Coronet A Coronet of a Baron Crest A Mullet Erminois between two Wings Argent Escutcheon Azure on a Fess Or a Hurt thereon a Mullet Erminois in chief a Bear's Head proper Supporters Dexter: a Bull Argent; Sinister: a Bear proper muzzled Or each charged on the shoulder with a Mullet Erminois Motto Probitate Et Labore (By uprightness and work)

Peerage of the United Kingdom
Preceded by John Baring	Baron Revelstoke; 2003–2012	Succeeded by Alexander Baring
