= Everard Baring =

British Army general (1865–1932)

Brigadier-General Everard Baring CVO CBE
- Born: 5 December 1865; Kingston upon Thames, Surrey, England
- Died: 7 May 1932 (aged 66); Hyde Park, London, England
- Education: Eton College; Royal Military College, Sandhurst
- Military career
- Allegiance: United Kingdom
- Branch: British Army
- Rank: Brigadier-General
- Commands: 10th Royal Hussars
- Conflicts: Mahdist War; First World War
- Awards: Commander of the Order of the British Empire; Commander of the Royal Victorian Order

Brigadier-General Everard Baring, CVO, CBE (5 December 1865 – 7 May 1932) was a British Army officer and Chairman of the Southern Railway.

== Early life and education ==
Baring was born in Kingston, Surrey, one of ten children of Edward Charles Baring, of the Baring family, by his wife, Louisa Emily Charlotte (née Bulteel), granddaughter of the 2nd Earl Grey. His father was created Baron Revelstoke in 1885, when Everard and his siblings received the style "the Honourable". His older brother was the banker John Baring, and a younger brother was the dramatist and poet Maurice Baring. His sister Margaret Baring married the 6th Earl Spencer and was great-grandmother to Diana, Princess of Wales.

Everard Baring was educated at Eton College and at the Royal Military College, Sandhurst.

== Career ==
Baring was commissioned a lieutenant in the North Staffordshire Regiment on 23 August 1884, and later transferred to the 10th Royal Hussars on 4 October. He was promoted to captain on 1 February 1890.

His military career encompassed the Nile Expedition between 1897 and 1898, where he was mentioned in despatches twice, and following which he was promoted to major on 16 November 1898. He was Military Secretary to the Viceroy of India (Lord Curzon Of Kedleston) between 11 December 1899 and December 1905. Baring later served in the First World War and commanded a brigade in 1916.

After retirement from the military, he became a Director of the National Provincial Bank before becoming Chairman of the Southern Railway in 1924. He died in office in 1932, aged 66, from undisclosed causes.

== Family ==
Baring married, on 15 September 1904, Lady Ulrica Duncombe, daughter of William Duncombe, 1st Earl Feversham and Mabel Violet née Graham.

== Death ==
He died at 26 Hyde Park, Middlesex. His remains are interred at St Peters Tandridge. His grave is located on the north side of the churchyard
