= Cecil Baring, 3rd Baron Revelstoke =

English banker and aristocrat

The Right Honourable The Lord Revelstoke
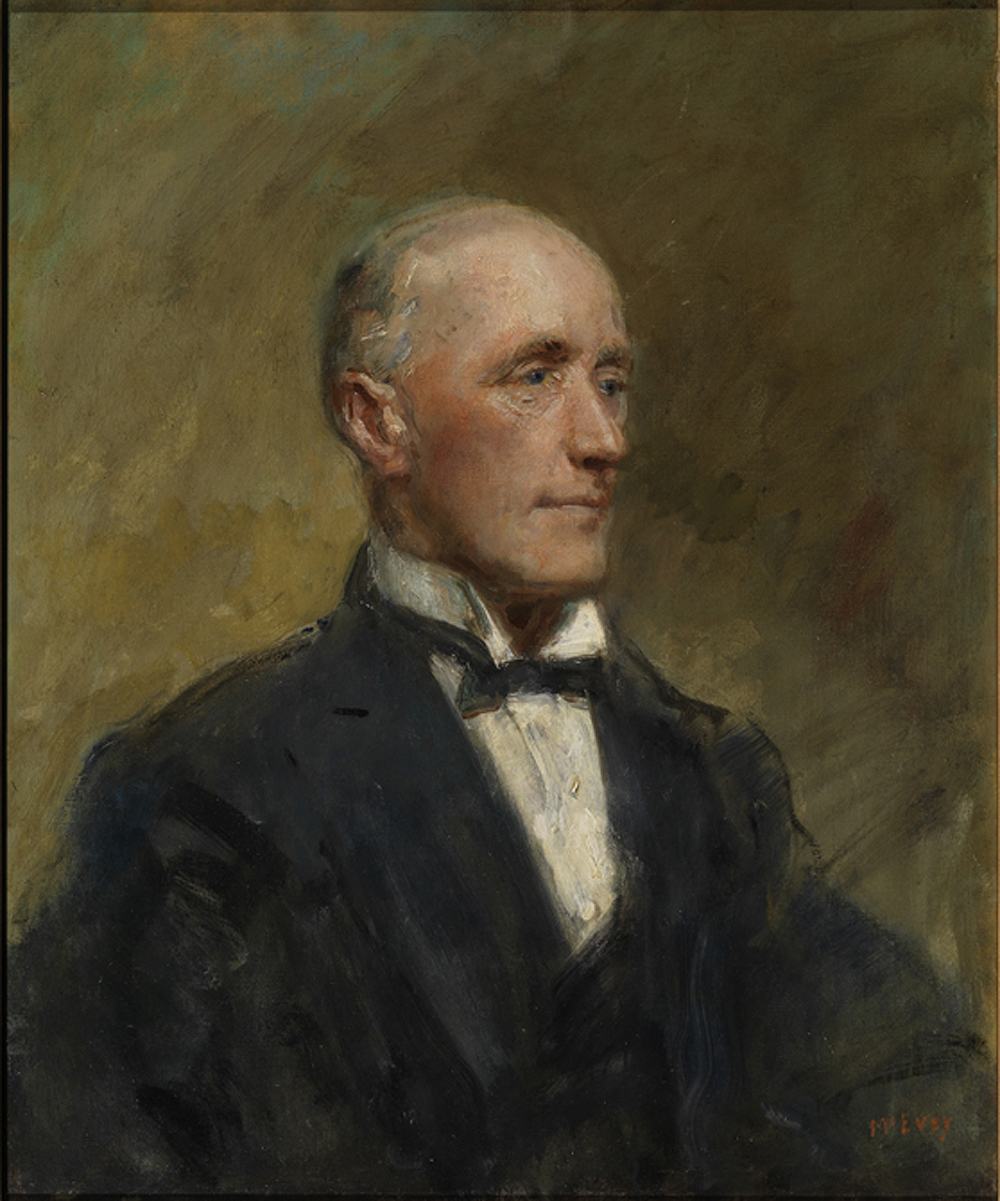
- Portrait of Lord Revelstoke

Personal details
- Born: Cecil Baring; 12 April 1864
- Died: 26 January 1934 (aged 69) London, England
- Spouse: Maude Lorillard Tailer (m. 1902; died 1922)
- Relations: John Baring, 2nd Baron Revelstoke (brother); Albert Spencer, 7th Earl Spencer (nephew); Patrick Pollen
- Children: 3
- Parent(s): Edward Baring, 1st Baron Revelstoke; Louisa Emily Charlotte Bulteel
- Education: Balliol College, Oxford

Cecil Baring, 3rd Baron Revelstoke (12 April 1864 – 26 January 1934) was an English banker and aristocrat.

== Early life ==
Baring was born on 12 April 1864. He was the third, but second surviving, of seven sons and three daughters born to Edward Baring, 1st Baron Revelstoke (1828–1897) and the former Louisa Emily Charlotte Bulteel. His elder brother was John Baring, 2nd Baron Revelstoke. His father was senior partner in the family banking firm of Baring Brothers and Co. His sister, Margaret, was the wife of Charles Spencer, 6th Earl Spencer.

His father was the second son of Henry Baring (son of Francis Baring, 1st Baronet) by his second wife, Cecilia Anne (née Windham), and brother of Evelyn Baring, 1st Earl of Cromer. His maternal grandparents were John Crocker Bulteel, MP, and his wife Lady Elizabeth Grey (herself the daughter of Charles Grey, 2nd Earl Grey).

Baring attended Eton and Balliol College, Oxford, graduating in 1887.

== Career ==
Soon after leaving Oxford, he went to New York City where he joined Kidder, Peabody & Co. of which his uncle, Thomas Baring, was a partner. He retired from business in 1901 and devoted himself to agricultural and natural history pursuits, particularly at Lambay Island, north of Dublin, which he acquired in 1904. He employed Edwin Lutyens to restore the castle there. In 1927, he donated an Etruscan bucchero vessel to the British Museum.

In 1911, he returned to London and was elected a director of the family firm, Baring Brothers and Co., later becoming head of the firm.

In 1929, he succeeded his unmarried elder brother John in the barony.

== Personal life ==
Baring was reportedly engaged to Grace Wilson, who later married Cornelius Vanderbilt III (which caused his father, Cornelius Vanderbilt II, to disinherit him).

On 8 November 1902, Baring was married to Maude Louise (née Lorillard) Tailer of New York, the youngest daughter of the tobacco millionaire, Pierre Lorillard IV. She was previously divorced from Thomas Suffern Tailer (a son of Edward Neufville Tailer), one of Cecil's business partners. Together, they were the parents of:

- Hon. Daphne Baring (1904–1986), who married Arthur Joseph Lawrence Pollen, eldest son of Arthur Pollen and grandson of Sir Joseph Lawrence, in 1920. They were the parents of Patrick Pollen.
- Hon. Calypso Baring (1905–1974), who married Guy Maynard Liddell, third son of Capt. Augustus Frederick Liddell, Comptroller and Treasurer to Prince Christian of Schleswig-Holstein (husband of Princess Helena of the United Kingdom) in 1926. They divorced in 1943.
- Rupert Alexander Baring, 4th Baron Revelstoke (1911–1994), who married Hon. Florence Flora Fermor-Hesketh, second daughter of Thomas Fermor-Hesketh, 1st Baron Hesketh and the former Florence Louisa Breckinridge (a daughter of John Witherspoon Breckinridge of San Francisco). They divorced in 1944 and she married Lt.-Cmdr. Derek Lawson of Passenham Manor.

Lady Revelstoke died on 2 April 1922. Lord Revelstoke died in London on 26 January 1934.

Peerage of the United Kingdom
Preceded by John Baring	Baron Revelstoke; 1929–1934	Succeeded by Rupert Baring
