= RMS Tayleur =

Clipper ship sunk on maiden voyage in 1854

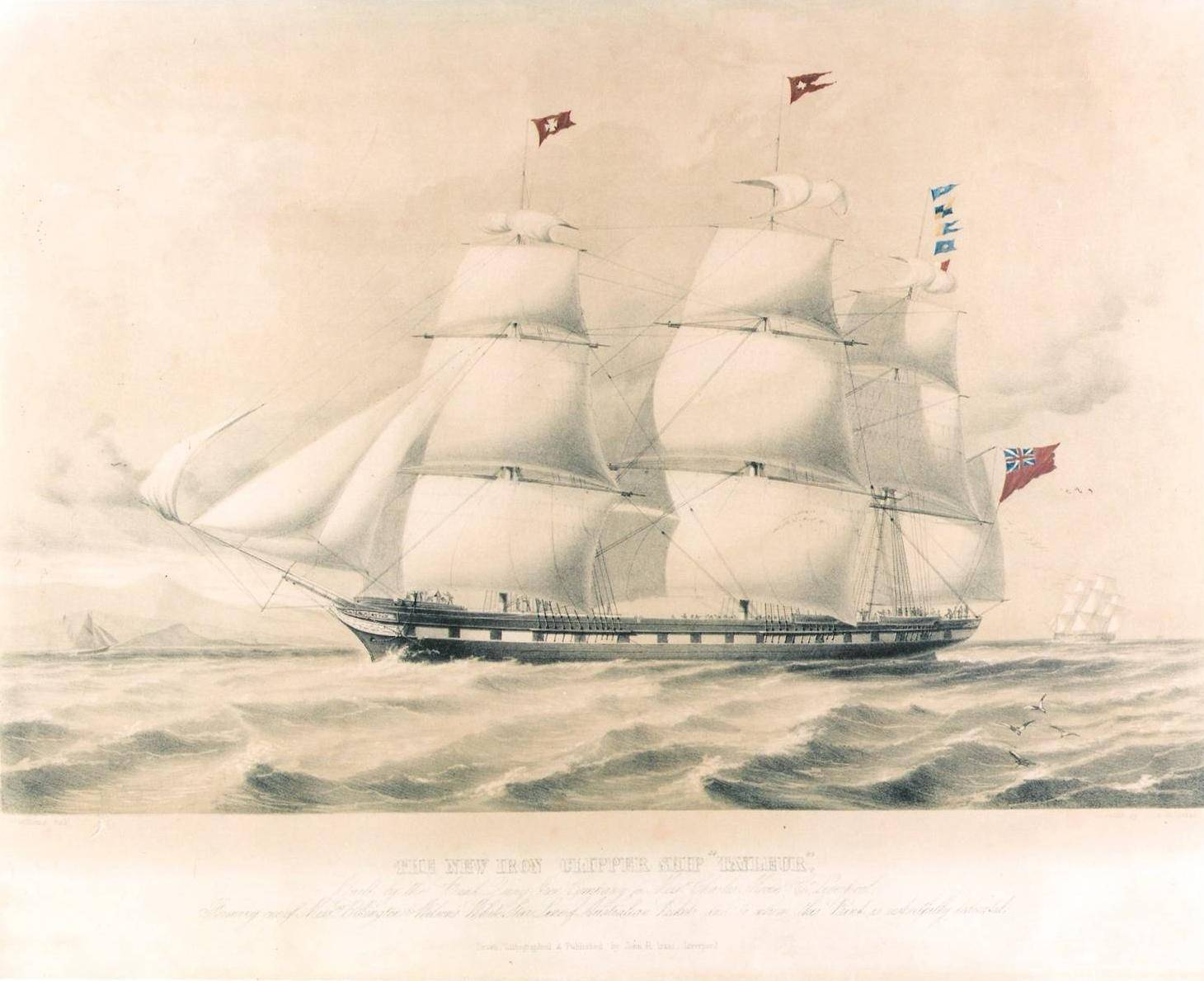
- RMS Tayleur in full sail

History

United Kingdom
- Name: Tayleur
- Namesake: Charles Tayleur
- Owner: Charles Moore & Company
- Port of registry: Liverpool
- Ordered: 6 February 1853
- Builder: William Rennie, Liverpool
- Cost: £50,000
- Laid down: April 1853
- Launched: 4 October 1853
- Acquired: 1854
- Maiden voyage: 19 January 1854
- In service: 19 January 1854
- Out of service: 21 January 1854
- Fate: Ran aground on the east coast of Lambay Island on maiden voyage, 21 January 1854

General characteristics
- Type: Clipper, iron hull
- Displacement: 1,750 tons
- Length: 230 ft (70 m)
- Beam: 40 ft (12 m)
- Draft: 21 ft (6.4 m)
- Depth of hold: 28 ft (8.5 m)
- Propulsion: sails
- Complement: 654 people on board
- Notes: 3 decks

RMS Tayleur was a short-lived, full-rigged iron clipper ship chartered by the White Star Line. She was large, fast and technically advanced. She ran aground off Lambay Island near Dublin, and sank on her maiden voyage in 1854. Of more than 650 aboard, only 280 survived. She has been described as "the first Titanic" of the White Star Line though was never under the same ownership as the latter.

== History ==
=== Construction ===
Tayleur was designed by William Rennie of Liverpool and built at the Charles Tayleur Foundry at Warrington for owners Charles Moore & Company (of Mooresfort, Lattin, Co Tipperary). She was launched in Warrington on the River Mersey on 4 October 1853 – it had taken just six months to build her. Prior to her launch, her future Captain John Noble had fallen into one of the seven holds and injured himself seriously. She was 230 feet in length with a 40-foot beam and displaced 1,750 tons, while 4,000 tons of cargo could be carried in holds 28 feet deep below three decks. Tayleur also had a net register tonnage of 2,500. She was named after Charles Tayleur, founder of the Vulcan Engineering Works, Bank Quay, Warrington.

Intended to begin her maiden voyage on 20 November 1853, her large size resulted in the delay of her maiden voyage by two months.

The new ship was chartered by White Star to serve the booming Australian trade routes, as transport to and from the colony was in high demand following the discovery of gold in Australia in 1851.

=== Disaster ===
Tayleur left Liverpool on 19 January 1854, on her maiden voyage, for Melbourne, Australia, with a complement of 627 passengers and 25 crew. She was mastered by 29-year-old Captain John Noble. During the inquiry, it was determined that her crew of 25 had only had 12 trained seamen amongst them, of which 8 could not speak English. It was reported in newspaper accounts that many of the crew were seeking free passage to Australia. Most of the crew were able to survive Tayleur's sinking.

Her compasses did not work properly because of the iron hull. The crew believed that they were sailing south through the Irish Sea, but were actually travelling west towards Ireland. On 21 January 1854, within 48 hours of sailing, Tayleur found herself in a fog and a storm, heading straight for the island of Lambay. The rudder was undersized for her tonnage, so that she was unable to tack around the island. The rigging was also faulty; the ropes had not been properly stretched, so that they became slack, making it nearly impossible to control the sails. Despite dropping both anchors as soon as rocks were sighted, Tayleur ran aground on the east coast of Lambay Island, about 5 miles from Dublin Bay

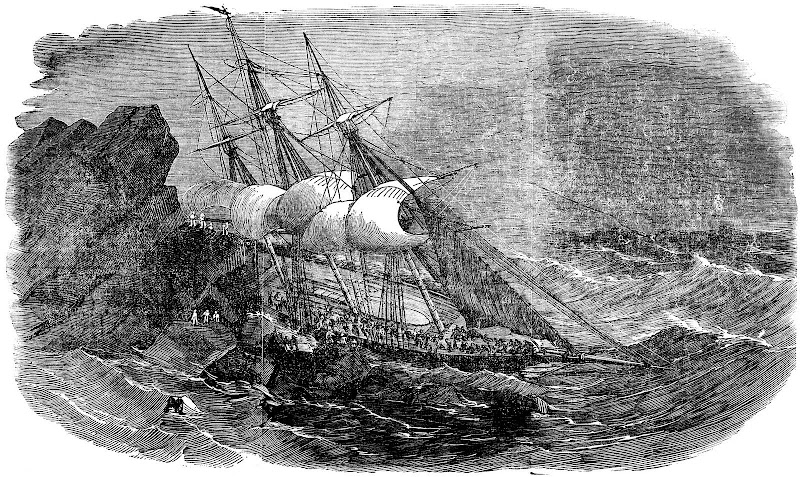
Loss of 'the Tayleur, off Lambay Island, Illustrated London News 1854

Initially, attempts were made to lower the ship's lifeboats, but the first one was smashed on the rocks. The second one drifted out into the Irish Sea; this lifeboat was eventually found in 1856. Then it was deemed that launching further boats was unsafe and unnecessary. Tayleur was so close to land that the crew were able to collapse a mast onto the shore, and some people aboard were able to jump onto land by clambering along the collapsed mast. Some who reached shore had carried ropes from the ship, allowing others to pull themselves to safety on the ropes. Captain Noble waited on board Tayleur until the last minute, then jumped towards shore, being rescued by one of the passengers.

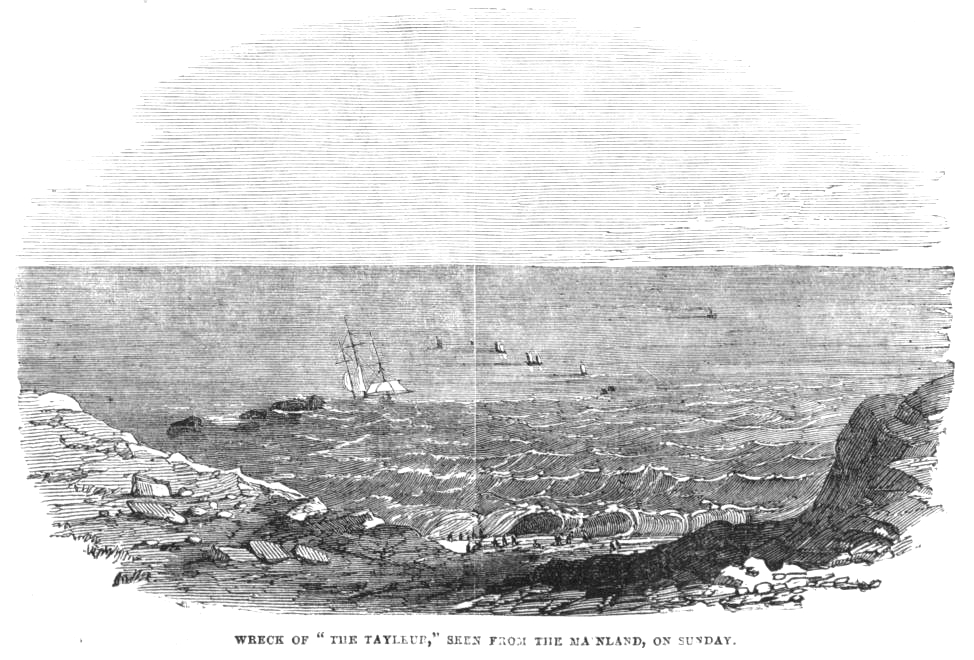
Wreck of the Tayleur, seen from the mainland, on the following Sunday

With the storm and high seas continuing, the ship was then washed into deeper water. She sank to the bottom with only the tops of her masts and flags showing.

A surviving passenger alerted the coastguard station on the island. This passenger and four coast guards launched the coastguard galley. When they reached the wreck, they found the last survivor, William Vivers, who had climbed to the tops of the rigging and spent 14 hours there. He was rescued by the coastguards. On 2 March 1854, George Finlay, the chief boatman, was awarded an RNLI silver medal for this rescue.

Newspaper accounts blamed the crew for negligence, but the official Coroner's Inquest absolved Captain Noble and placed the blame on the ship's owners, accusing them of neglect for allowing the ship to depart without its compasses being properly adjusted. The Board of Trade, however, did fault the captain for not taking soundings, a standard practice when sailing in low visibility. The causes of the wreck were complex and included:

- Compass problems due to the placing of an iron river steamer on the deck after the compasses had been swung.
- Absence of a mast head compass placed at a distance from the iron hull.
- Northerly current in the Irish sea similar to that which drove the Great Britain northward.
- Slotting effect of the wind in the sails driving the ship sideways.
- Large turning circle making the ship un-maneuverable.
- The anchor chains breaking when they were dropped in final efforts to save the ship.
- The captain being injured in a serious fall and possibly having head injuries as a result.
- Lack of lifebelts (then uncommon) and panic leading to increased loss of life.

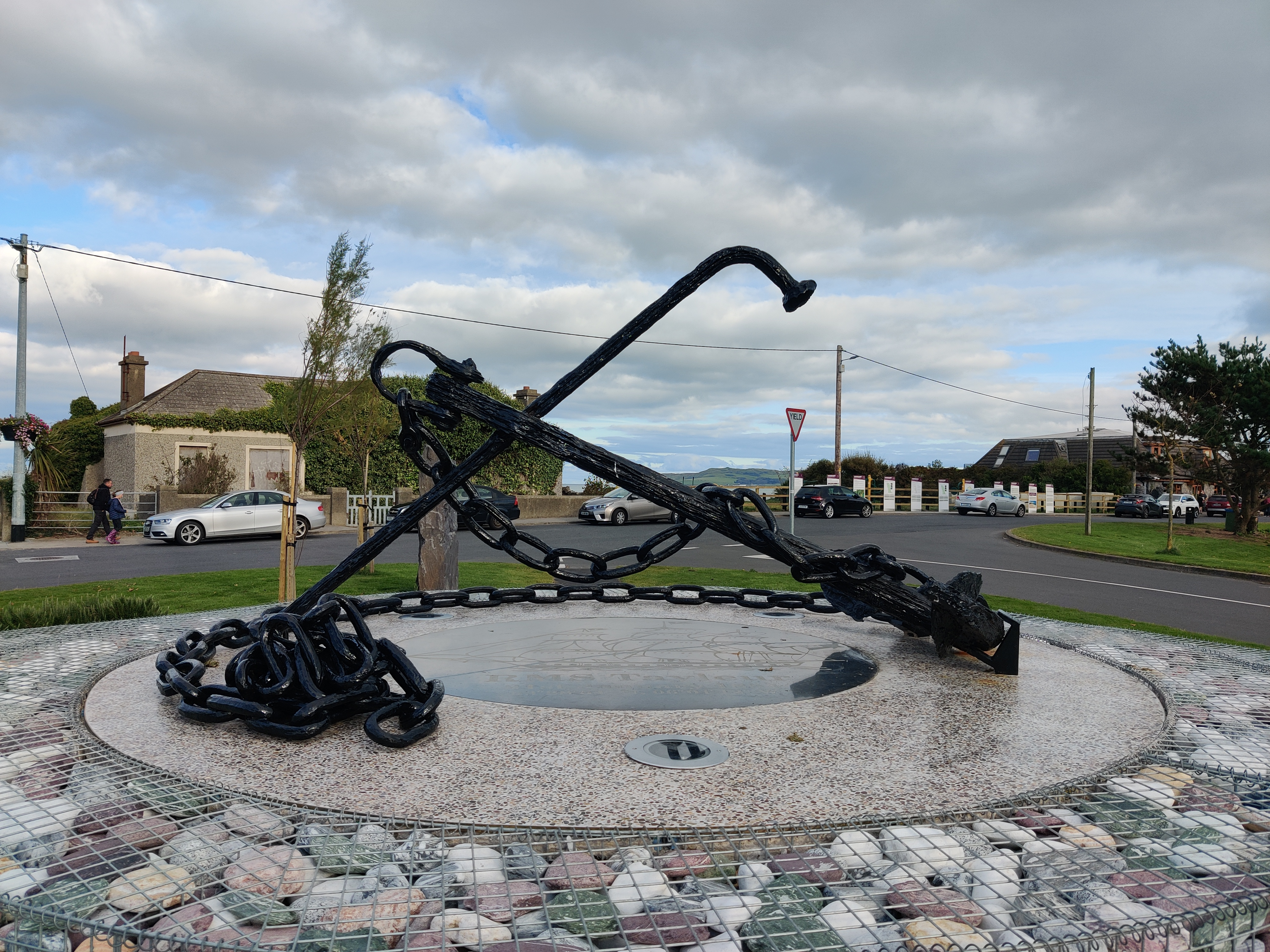
Memorial to the RMS Tayleur in Portrane, Dublin

Tayleur has been compared with RMS Titanic. They shared similarities in their separate times. Both were RMS vessels and White Star Liners (although these were different companies), and both went down on their maiden voyages. Inadequate or faulty equipment contributed to both disasters (faulty compasses and rigging for the Tayleur, and lack of life boats for the Titanic).

== Inquiries ==
There were four official inquiries:

- The inquest held at Malahide;
- The Board of Trade Inquiry under Captain Walker;
- The Admiralty investigation was chaired by Mr. Grantham, Inspector of Iron Ships;

The Liverpool Maritime Board tried the fitness of Captain Noble to command. There are contradictions between these inquiries.

Estimates of the number of lives lost vary, as do the numbers on board. The latter are between 528 and 680, while the dead are ranged from 100 to 475, depending on source. Out of over 200 women on board, only three survived, possibly in part due to the heavy layers of clothing commonly worn by women of that era. Of the more than 50 children on board, only 2 survived. The survivors were then faced with having to get up an almost sheer 80 foot (24m) cliff to get to shelter. When word of the disaster reached the Irish mainland, the City of Dublin Steam Packet Company sent the steamer Prince to look for survivors. Recent research by Dr Edward J Bourke names 662 on board.

A memorial to those killed in the wreck was unveiled at Portrane (53.493441 -6.108558) on 16 May 1999.

In memory of those lost a Tayleur fund for the succour of shipwrecked strangers, was set up.

== Diving ==
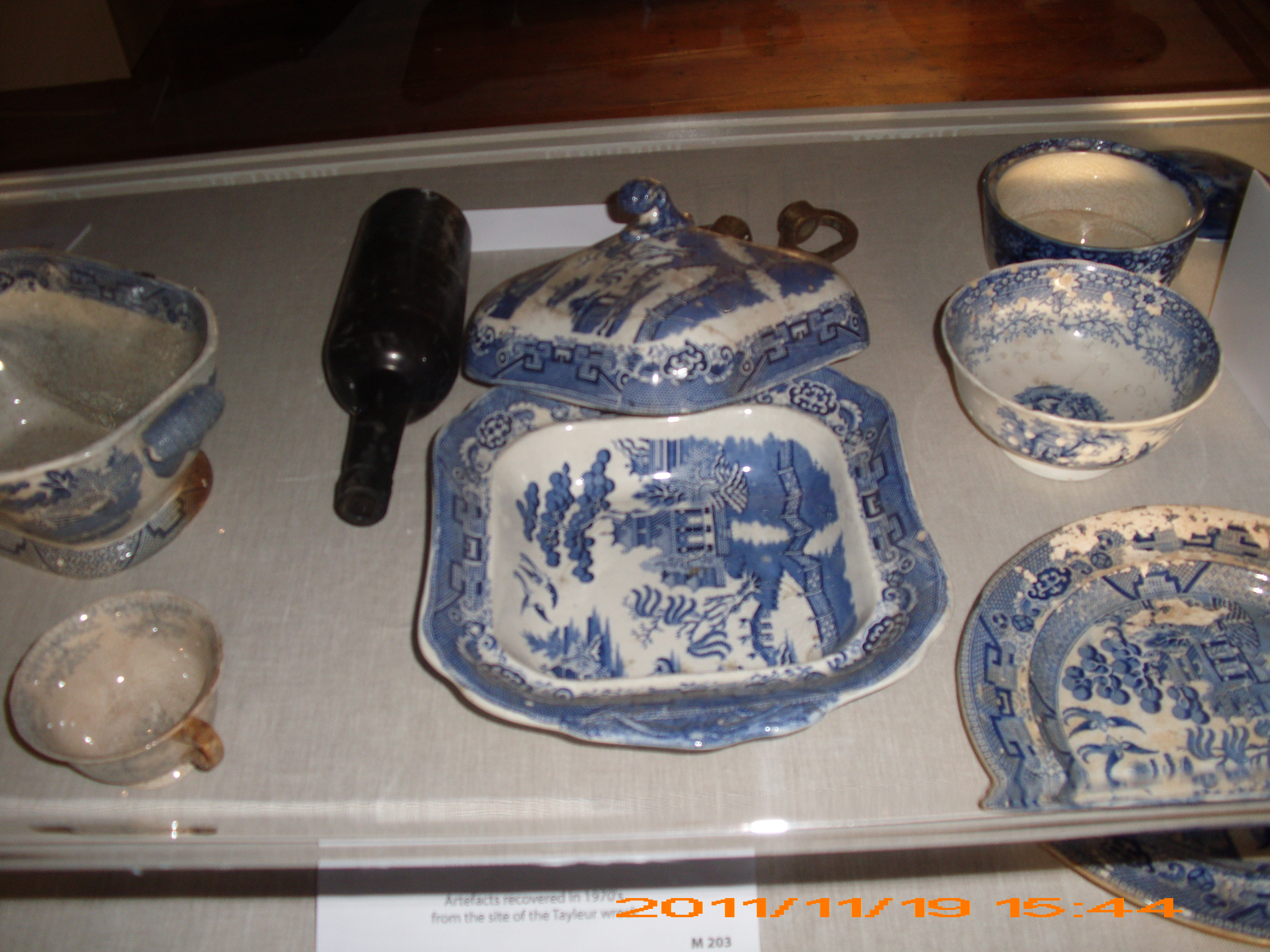
Display in the National Maritime Museum of Ireland

The remains of the wreck were rediscovered in 1959 by members of the Irish Sub-Aqua Club. Because the wreck is over 100 years old (172 as of 2026) a license to dive the site must be obtained from the Office of Public Works.

The wreck lies at 17 metres (10 fathoms) depth some 30 metres (yards) off the southeast corner of Lambay Island in a small indentation at 53°28′54″N 06°01′12″W. Substantial wreckage includes the hull, side plates, a donkey engine and the lower mast. The woodwork was salvaged shortly after the wreck. Crockery and several pieces of the wreck are on display at Newbridge House, Donabate.
