= Patrick Pollen =

British stained-glass artist

- Born: Patrick Laprimaudaye Pollen; 12 January 1928; London, United Kingdom
- Died: 30 November 2010 (aged 82); County Wexford, Ireland
- Known for: stained glass design

Patrick Pollen (12 January 1928 – 30 November 2010) was a British stained-glass artist who spent most of his life working in Ireland.

== Early life and education ==
Patrick La Primaudaye Pollen was born in London on 12 January 1928, the second son and second of six children of Arthur and Daphne Pollen (née Baring). Arthur Pollen was a sculptor of religious works, and grandson of John Hungerford Pollen. Daphne was the daughter of Cecil Baring, 3rd Baron Revelstoke, who purchased Lambay Island and employed Edwin Lutyens to restore the castle there. Daphne was a painter of religious matter. Pollen attended St Philip's preparatory school in South Kensington, then Avisford, near Arundel, and finally Ampleforth College, going on to serve national service. He attended the Slade School of Fine Art for two years to study painting, going on to work at an art school in Paris, Académie Julian.

== Stained glass work ==
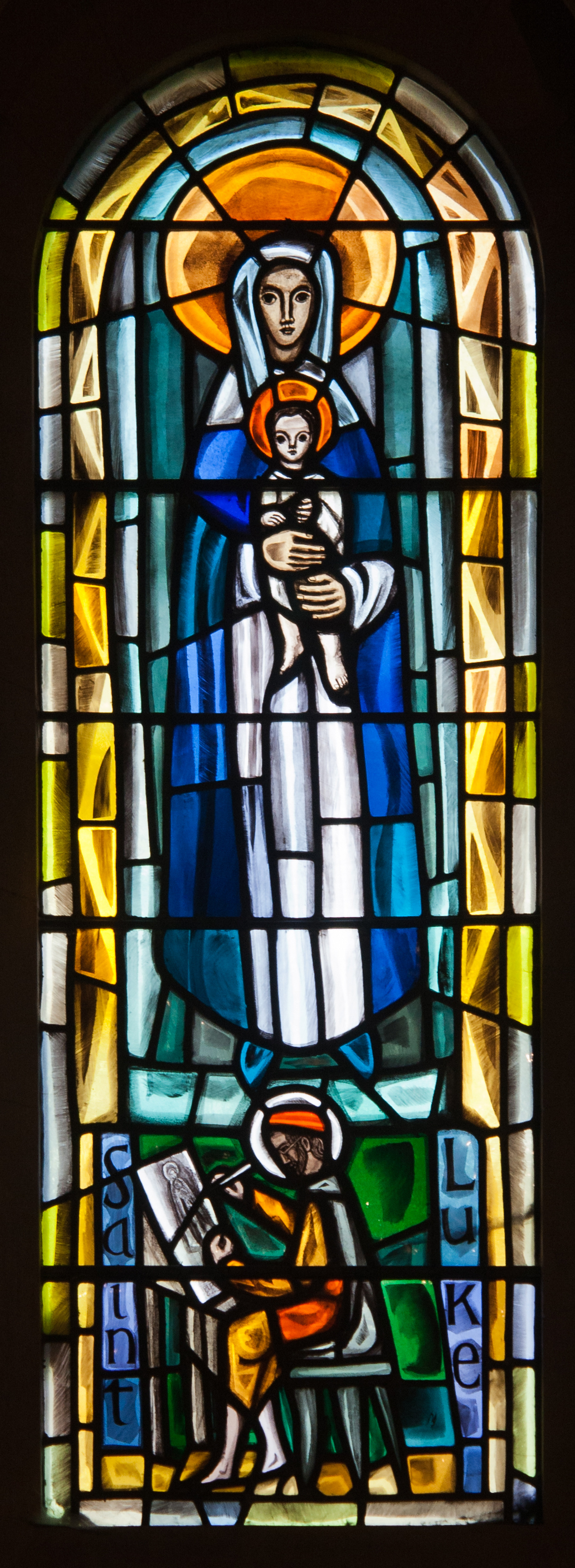
Christ Church Cathedral, Dublin Chapel of Laurence O'Toole Window Virgin and Child with Saint Luke

In 1952 Pollen's father took him to see Evie Hone's Crucifixion and Last Supper window in Eton College Chapel. Upon seeing it he announced "That's what I want to do." He moved to Dublin to study with the stained glass cooperative Evie Hone was a member of, An Túr Gloine, which was run by Catherine O'Brien and she and Hone became his mentors. When Hone died in 1955, she left him her brushes.

His early work from the 1950s is mostly in Britain, including a window in a private chapel in the London Oratory, three windows for a chapel at Whitchurch, and a crypt window for Rosslyn Chapel. Pollen worked for two years from 1957 on 32 windows for the new Cathedral of Christ The King, Johannesburg. He made the windows in Dublin, then shipping them to be assembled in South Africa. Pollen created the mosaic of St Joseph the Worker and windows for Galway Cathedral. In 1963 Pollen created a memorial window to Catherine O'Brien in Christ Church Cathedral, Dublin. He took on Helen Moloney as an assistant from 1960 to 1962.

Following Vatican II newly designed churches featured less stained glass, and Pollen found he was receiving less commissions. As a consequence Pollen and his family moved to the United States in 1981. They settled in Winston-Salem, North Carolina but there was very little work there and in 1997 they returned in Ireland, living in his wife native County Wexford.

== Family ==
Pollen married sculptor Nell Murphy in 1963, with the couple buying a house in Dublin in which Pollen had his studio. Murphy worked in plaster, clay and stone, her works often features in churches with that of Pollen. They had four sons, Peter, Ciaran, Laurence and Christopher, and a daughter, Brid. Pollen died on 30 November 2010 in County Wexford.

== Other works ==
- Six windows in Ballinteer Roman Catholic Church, Dublin.
- Windows for the new church at Lifford, County Donegal (1962).
- Three windows for a church at Milford, County Donegal (1960).
- Memorial window in St Anne's Cathedral, Belfast, to soldiers of Irish regiments killed in the First and Second World Wars (early 1980s).
- Four-panel Epiphany for Foster's Almshouses, Bristol (1968).

== See also ==
- An Túr Gloine
