= Lord Falmouth =

Lord Falmouth may refer to:

- Viscount Falmouth, a title in the peerage of England
- a Solenostemon scutellarioides cultivar
