= Pierre Lorillard IV =

American tobacco manufacturer and racehorse owner

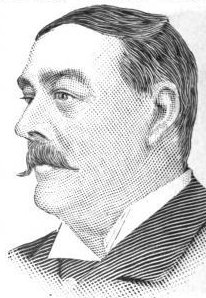
- A circa 1888 sketch of Lorillard
- Born: October 13, 1833; Westchester, New York, U.S.
- Died: July 7, 1901 (aged 67); New York City, U.S.
- Resting place: Green-Wood Cemetery
- Occupations: Businessman, Racehorse owner and breeder
- Known for: Tuxedo Club
- Board member of: P. Lorillard and Company
- Spouse: Emily Taylor (m. 1858)
- Children: 4, including Maude Louise Lorillard
- Parent(s): Pierre Lorillard III; Catherine Griswold
- Relatives: George L. Lorillard (brother); Peter Hill Beard (grandson); Mary Lorillard (sister)

Pierre J. Lorillard IV (October 13, 1833 – July 7, 1901) was an American tobacco manufacturer and thoroughbred race horse owner.

== Early life ==
Born in Westchester, New York, he was the son of Pierre Lorillard III (1796–1867) and Catherine Griswold. In 1760, his great-grandfather, and namesake, founded P. Lorillard and Company in New York City to process tobacco, cigars, and snuff. Today, Lorillard Tobacco Company is the oldest tobacco company in the U.S.

== Life ==
In the early 1880s, Lorillard helped make Newport, Rhode Island a yachting center with his schooner Vesta and a steam yacht Radha. He owned a summer estate in Newport called "The Breakers", which he sold to Cornelius Vanderbilt II in 1882 in order to use his newly developed estate, the Tuxedo Club, at what became known as Tuxedo Park in Orange County, New York. Lorillard had inherited 13,000 acres (53 km^{2}) around Tuxedo Lake, which he developed in conjunction with William Waldorf Astor and other wealthy associates into a luxury retreat.

Lorillard hired famed architect Bruce Price to design his clubhouse and the many "cottages" of the era along with landscape architect Arthur P. Kroll, in 1929. Lorillard was also a member of the Jekyll Island Club, also known as The Millionaires Club, and the Saint Nicholas Society of the City of New York.

While it has been reported that Lorillard's son, Griswold Lorillard, introduced the then-unnamed tuxedo to the United States in 1886 at the Tuxedo Club's Autumn Ball, this is now known to be incorrect. While Griswold and his friends did create a stir by wearing unorthodox clothing, their jackets were closer to tailcoats without tails, or what would now be called a mess jacket.

=== Thoroughbred racing ===
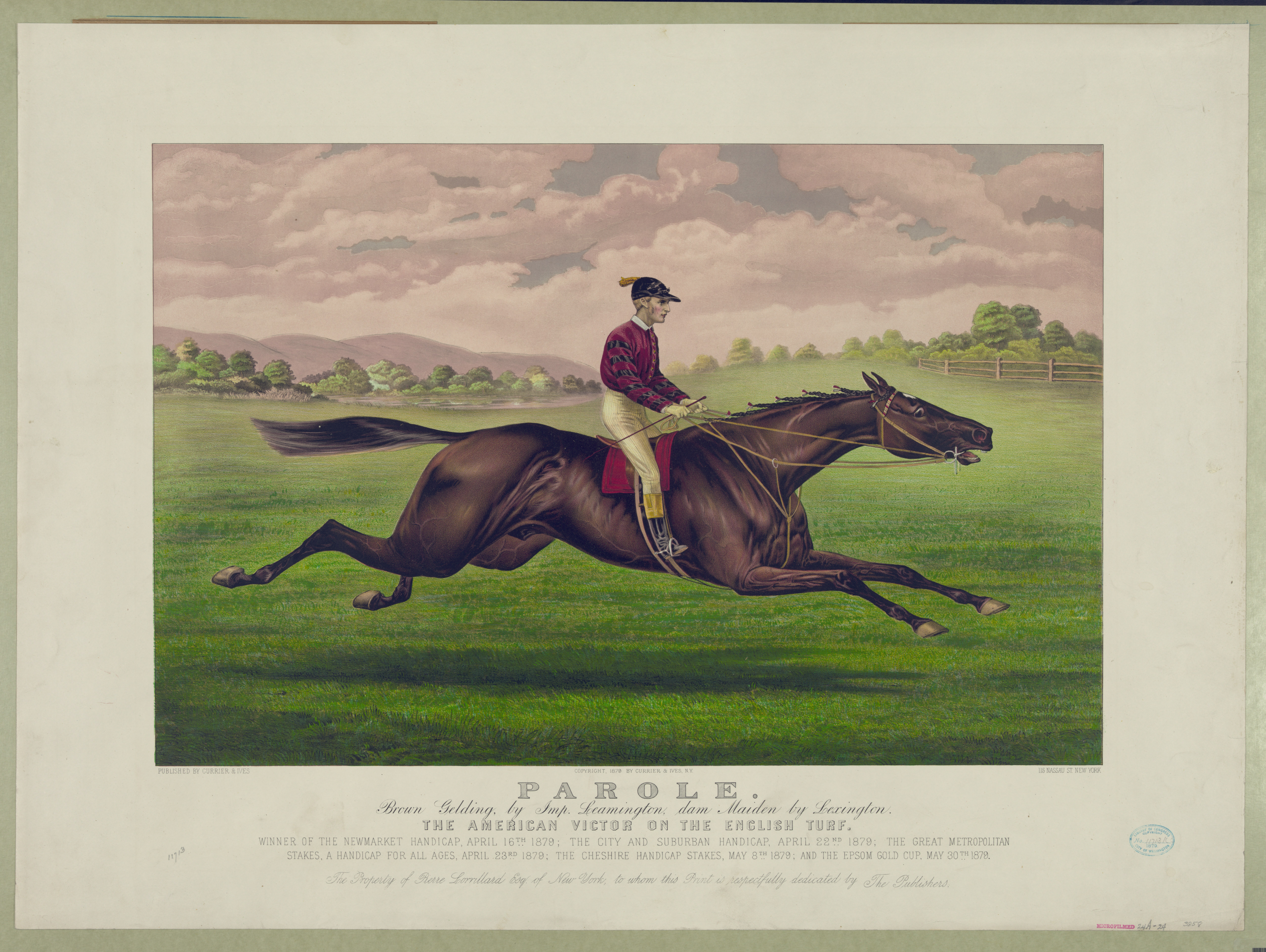
Parole (Currier and Ives, 1879)

An avid sportsman, Pierre Lorillard and his brother, George Lyndes Lorillard, were both major figures in Thoroughbred horse racing. In 1874, Pierre's horse, Saxon, won the Belmont Stakes. Although his horse "Parole" finished fourth in the 1876 Kentucky Derby, it went on to race with considerable success both in the United States and in Europe. In the 19th century, shipping horses from New York to Louisville, Kentucky was a major undertaking and as the Preakness Stakes and the Belmont Stakes were both held in the New York City area in the period, neither of the Lorillard brothers entered horses again in the Kentucky Derby.

Lorillard established Rancocas Stable, named for the New Jersey town where he owned a country house. He spent time in Paris and in England where, in 1881, his horse Iroquois became the first American-owned and bred horse to win a European classic race. Ridden by the champion English jockey Fred Archer, Iroquois won The Derby and then went on to capture the St. Leger Stakes as well. Iroquois, foaled in 1878 in Pennsylvania and bred by Aristides Welch, was described as notoriously difficult to handle. Archer, known as "The Tin Man," was originally contracted to ride a different horse at Epsom but requested the mount on Iroquois; his owner Lord Falmouth consented. The victory caused a sensation in the United States and is credited with boosting American racetrack attendance upon Iroquois's return home in 1883. The horse went on to become the leading sire in North America in 1892. His legacy endures in several named races, including the Iroquois Stakes at Churchill Downs — a Road to the Kentucky Derby prep race — and the Iroquois Steeplechase held annually at Percy Warner Park in Nashville, whose organizers adopted Lorillard's racing colors of cherry red and black as the event's official colors. Lorillard had other successes in England, notably with the horse named for the actor David Garrick, which won the 1901 Chester Cup ridden by American jockey, Danny Maher.

=== Exploration ===
Beyond his interest in racehorses, Lorillard was a scholar who financed the Central American expedition of the French archaeologist Désiré Charnay and his publication of "The Ancient Cities of the New World. Being Travels and Explorations in Mexico and Central America from 1857–1882."

For making the project possible, the government of France awarded Lorillard the Legion of Honor. Charnay named some Maya ruins "Lorillard City" in his honor, but the name did not stick, and the site is better known as Yaxchilan. Lorillard also helped finance some of the explorations of Augustus Le Plongeon.

== Personal life ==
In 1858, Lorillard married Emily Taylor (1840–1925), the daughter of Isaac Ebenezer Taylor (b. 1815) and Eliza Mary Mollan Taylor (d. 1867). Together, they had four children:

- Emily Lorillard (1858–1909), who married William Kent (1858–1910) in 1881.
- Pierre Lorillard V (1860–1940), who married (first) in 1881 Caroline Jaffray Hamilton (1859–1909); and (second) Ruth Hill (1879–1959), daughter of James Jerome Hill.
- Nathaniel Griswold Lorillard (1862–1888), who died aged 26.
- Maude Louise Lorillard (1876–1922) who married Thomas Suffern Tailer on April 15, 1893, After their divorce, she married Hon. Cecil Baring, later 3rd Baron Revelstoke in 1902. He was the third, but second surviving, son of the 1st Baron Revelstoke; her husband succeeded his unmarried elder brother in 1929.

== Death ==
Pierre Lorillard died in 1901, aged 67, and was interred in the Green-Wood Cemetery in Brooklyn, New York. His wife Emily died in 1925 and was interred next to him.

Lorillard Place in The Bronx is named for him and his brother George.

=== Descendants ===
He was the step-grandfather of the artist Peter Hill Beard.

Through his daughter's second marriage, Lorillard was an ancestor of the present Baron Revelstoke and of the heir apparent to the earldom of Oxford and Asquith.
