= Edward Baring, 1st Baron Revelstoke =

British banker (1828–1897)

The Right Honourable The Lord Revelstoke
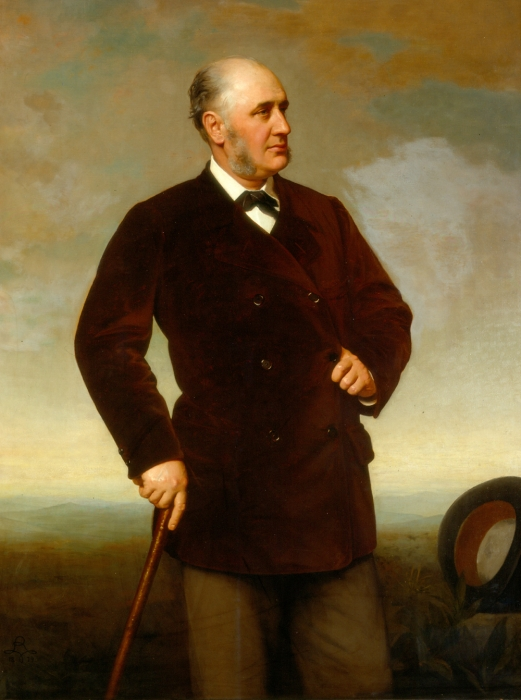

Director of the Bank of England
- In office 1879–1891

Personal details
- Born: Edward Charles Baring; 13 April 1828
- Died: 17 July 1897 (aged 69)
- Spouse: Louisa Emily Charlotte Bulteel (m. 1861)
- Relations: Sir Francis Baring, 1st Baronet (grandfather); Evelyn Baring, 1st Earl of Cromer (brother); Henry Bingham Baring (half-brother)
- Children: 10, including John, Cecil, Everard, Maurice
- Parent(s): Henry Baring; Cecilia Anne Windham
- Education: Rugby School

Edward Charles Baring, 1st Baron Revelstoke (13 April 1828 – 17 July 1897), was a British banker.

== Early life ==
A member of the Baring banking family, "Ned" Baring was born on 13 April 1828. He was the second son of Henry Baring from his second marriage, to Cecilia Anne (née Windham). His younger brother was Evelyn Baring, 1st Earl of Cromer. His father, a Member of Parliament for Bossiney and Colchester, was divorced from Maria Matilda Bingham, a daughter of U.S. Senator William Bingham, the former wife of French aristocrat James Alexander, Comte de Tilly. From his father's first marriage, his elder half-brother was Henry Bingham Baring, an MP Callington who married Lady Augusta Brudenell, a daughter of Robert Brudenell, 6th Earl of Cardigan.

Sir Francis Baring, 1st Baronet was his grandfather and among his extended family were several uncles: Sir Thomas Baring, 2nd Baronet and Alexander Baring, 1st Baron Ashburton (who married Ann, another Bingham daughter).

He was educated at Rugby School in Warwickshire.

== Career ==
Baring in 1882 became senior partner in the family banking firm of Baring Brothers and Co until forced to step down following the Baring crisis 1890. Edward's younger brother Thomas also became a partner in the bank.

He was also a Director of the Bank of England (1879–1891), chairman of Lloyds (1887–1892) and a Lieutenant of the City of London. On 30 June 1885 he was raised to the peerage as Baron Revelstoke, of Membland in the County of Devon.

The town of Revelstoke in British Columbia, Canada was renamed in his honour, commemorating his role in securing the financing necessary for completion of the Canadian Pacific Railway.

== Personal life ==
On 30 April 1861, Lord Revelstoke married Louisa Emily Charlotte Bulteel, daughter of John Crocker Bulteel, MP, and his wife Lady Elizabeth Grey (herself the daughter of Charles Grey, 2nd Earl Grey). They had seven sons and three daughters, including:

- John Baring, 2nd Baron Revelstoke (1863–1929), who died unmarried.
- Cecil Baring, 3rd Baron Revelstoke (1864–1934), who married the divorced American heiress Maude (née Lorillard) Tailer, daughter of Pierre Lorillard IV.
- Hon. Everard Baring (1865–1932), a Brig.-Gen. who served as Military Secretary to the Viceroy of India from 1899 to 1905. He married Lady Ulrica Duncombe, fourth daughter of William Duncombe, 1st Earl of Feversham in 1904.
- Hon. Elizabeth Baring (1867–1944), who married Valentine Browne, 5th Earl of Kenmare, in 1887.
- Hon. Margaret Baring (1868–1906), who married Charles Spencer, 6th Earl Spencer, in 1887.
- Hon. Susan Baring (1870-1961), a Maid of Honour to Queen Victoria 1898-99 who married Sir James Reid of Ellon, 1st Baronet, physician in ordinary to Queen Victoria, King Edward VII and King George V, in 1899.
- Hon. Maurice Baring (1874–1945), the man of letters who died unmarried.
- Hon. Hugo Baring (1876–1949), who married Lady Evelyn Harriet Hogg, widow of James McGarel-Hogg, 2nd Baron Magheramorne and second daughter of Anthony Ashley-Cooper, 8th Earl of Shaftesbury, in 1905.

Lady Revelstoke died in 1892. Lord Revelstoke survived her by five years and died in July 1897, aged 69. He was succeeded in the barony by his second but eldest surviving son John.

== In popular culture ==
- Appears as a minor character in the historical-mystery novel Stone's Fall, by Iain Pears.
- Appears as a minor character in the historical-mystery novel The Last Days of Night, by Graham Moore.
- Appears in the Nightmare Song, from Gilbert & Sullivan's Iolanthe, when the Lord Chancellor sings that "The shares are a penny and ever so many are taken by Rothschild and Baring"

== Ancestry ==
Ancestors of Edward Baring, 1st Baron Revelstoke

8. Johann Baring
4. Sir Francis Baring, 1st Baronet, of Larkbeer
9. Elizabeth Vowler
2. Henry Baring
10. William Herring
5. Harriet Herring
11. Montague Dorothy Dawson
1. Edward Baring, 1st Baron Revelstoke
12. Rev. George Lukin
6. William Lukin
13. Susan Katherine Doughty
3. Cecilia Anne Windham
14. Pierre Thellusson
7. Anne Thellusson
15. Anne Woodford

== Arms ==
Coat of arms of Edward Baring, 1st Baron Revelstoke
Coronet A Coronet of a Baron Crest A Mullet Erminois between two Wings Argent Escutcheon Azure on a Fess Or a Hurt thereon a Mullet Erminois in chief a Bear's Head proper Supporters Dexter: a Bull Argent; Sinister: a Bear proper muzzled Or each charged on the shoulder with a Mullet Erminois Motto Probitate Et Labore (By uprightness and work)

== See also ==
- Dartmouth House, Mayfair, London

Peerage of the United Kingdom
New creation	Baron Revelstoke; 1885–1897	Succeeded by John Baring
