= Maurice Baring =

British author (1874–1945)

Maurice Baring OBE
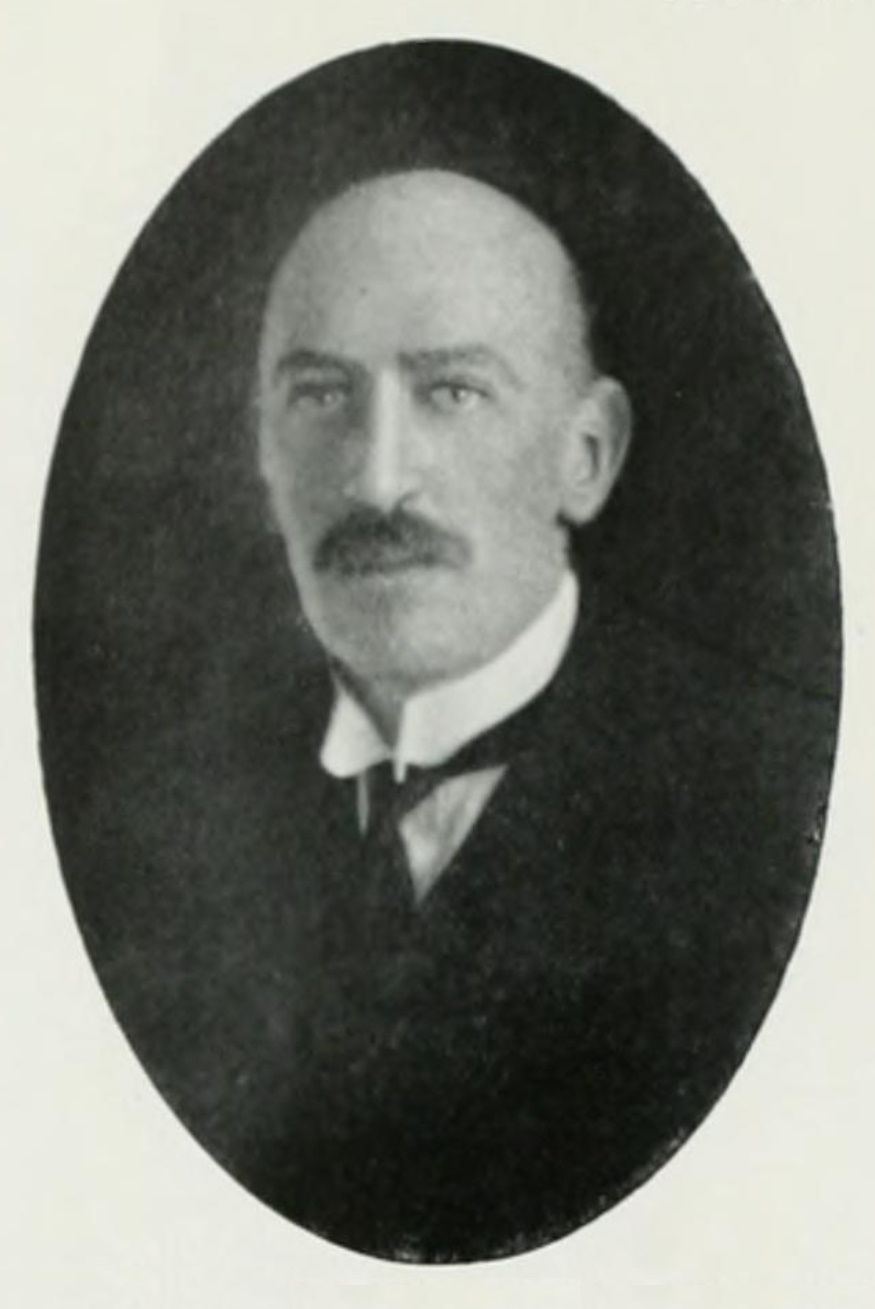
- Photographic portrait of Maurice Baring (about 1922)
- Born: Maurice Baring; 27 April 1874; Mayfair, London, England
- Died: 14 December 1945 (aged 71); Beaufort Castle, Scotland
- Education: Eton College; Trinity College, Cambridge
- Occupations: Dramatist, poet, novelist, translator and essayist
- Writing career
- Language: English

Maurice Baring OBE (27 April 1874 – 14 December 1945) was an English man of letters, known as a dramatist, poet, novelist, translator and essayist, and also as a travel writer and war correspondent, with particular knowledge of Russia. During World War I, Baring served in the Intelligence Corps and Royal Air Force.

== Life and writings ==
Baring was the eighth child, and fifth son, of Edward Charles Baring, first Baron Revelstoke, of the Baring banking family, and his wife Louisa Emily Charlotte Bulteel, granddaughter of the second Earl Grey. Born in Mayfair, he was educated at Eton College and Trinity College, Cambridge. After an abortive start of a diplomatic career, he travelled widely, particularly in Russia, where he lived in 1905–06. He reported as an eye-witness of the Russo-Japanese War for the London Morning Post. On returning to London he lived at North Cottage, 6 North Street, Westminster.

At the start of World War I he joined the Royal Flying Corps, where he served as assistant to David Henderson and Hugh Trenchard in France. Throughout the war he corresponded with Lady Juliet Duff, the widow of Sir Robin Duff, 2nd Baronet of Vaynol, who was killed on 16 October 1914 near Oostnieuwkerke while serving with the 2nd Life Guards. These letters were later published under the title of Dear Animated Bust: Letters to Lady Juliet Duff. In 1918, Baring served as a staff officer in the Royal Air Force and was appointed Officer of the Order of the British Empire in the 1918 Birthday Honours. In 1925 Baring received an honorary commission as a wing commander in the Reserve of Air Force Officers. After his death, Trenchard wrote, "He was the most unselfish man I have ever met or am likely to meet. The Flying Corps owed to this man much more than they know or think."

As an author, Baring wrote poetical dramas earlier in his career (for instance The Black Prince and Other Poems, 1902), then a series of books on Russia (such as Landmarks in Russian Literature, 1910, and The Mainsprings of Russia, 1914). After the war he turned to full time writing and began to write novels. These included C (1924), Cat's Cradle (1925), The Coat Without Seams (1929), Robert Peckham (1930) and The Lonely Lady of Dulwich (1934). An autobiography, The Puppet Show of Memory, came out in 1922, focused on his childhood and youth. From 1925 his publisher William Heinemann issued his works in a Collected Uniform Edition. After living at various London addresses, he moved in 1930 to a small villa in Rottingdean. His last full-scale work was the anthology with commentary Have You Anything to Declare (1936).

He experienced chronic illness during the last years of his life; for his final 15 years, he had Parkinson's disease. He was cared for at Beaufort Castle in Scotland, the home of his relative Lady Laura Lovat, from August 1940 until his death.

== Personal life ==
He was widely known socially, to some of the Cambridge Apostles, to The Coterie, and to the literary group associating with G. K. Chesterton and Hilaire Belloc in particular. He enjoyed close friendships with Dame Ethel Smyth (who produced a biography of him in 1938) and Enid Bagnold.

He was an accomplished reader and scholar of the Greek and Latin classics, and fluent in five or six modern languages. His friend the career diplomat Sir Ronald Storrs wrote that Baring was, "equally at home with the greatest writers of English, French, Italian, Spanish, German, Latin, and Greek; with the then almost startling additions of Danish and Russian literature." However he tended to conceal rather than display his learning, and was staunch in his anti-intellectualism with respect to the arts, and a convinced practical joker.

Previously an agnostic, he converted to Roman Catholicism in 1909, which he described in his autobiography as "the only action in my life which I am quite certain I have never regretted." Speaking from personal experience, however, he once advised Belloc to "never, never, never talk theology or discuss the Church with those outside it. People simply do not understand what you are talking about and they merely (a) get angry and (b) come to the conclusion that one doesn't believe in the thing oneself and that one is simply doing it to annoy."

== Legacy ==
Belloc dedicated three of his books to Baring: On Nothing and Kindred Subjects, Green Overcoat, and The Cruise of the Nona. Baring is also mentioned in Belloc's Cautionary Verses:

Like many of the upper class

He liked the sound of broken glass*
* A line I stole with subtle daring
From Wing-Commander Maurice Baring

He once gave Virginia Woolf a copy of his book C. She was not impressed, writing in her diary: "Second-rate art i.e. C., by Maurice Baring. Within its limits, it is not second rate, or there is nothing markedly so, at first go off. The limits are the proof of its non-existence. He can only do one thing; himself to wit; charming, clean, modest, sensitive Englishman. Outside that radius and it does not carry far nor illumine much, all is—as-it-should be—light, sure, proportioned, affecting even; told in so well-bred a manner that nothing is exaggerated, all related, proportioned. I could read this for ever, I said. L. said one would soon be sick to death of it".

The character Horne Fisher, the protagonist of The Man Who Knew Too Much, a collection of detective stories by G. K. Chesterton, "is generally thought to be based on Chesterton's good friend, Maurice Baring". Although, while "Fisher fits Baring's physical description, he is a respected member of the upper class, and he seems to know everybody and everything", the similarity ends there, Chesterton scholar Dale Ahlquist notes: "By all accounts, the real Baring was a charming, affable gentleman who knew how to laugh and had no fear of making a fool of himself", while "Horne Fisher is distinctly lacking in both the charm and humour departments."

The writer Vernon Lee was a friend of Baring. Lee dedicated her 1927 short-story collection For Maurice: Five Unlikely Stories to Baring.

== Works ==
- The Black Prince and Other Poems (1903)
- With the Russians in Manchuria. (1905) London: Methuen. OCLC 811786
- Forget-me-Not and Lily of the Valley (1905) Humphreys
- Sonnets and Short Poems (1906)
- Thoughts on Art and Life by Leonardo da Vinci. Translated by Baring, Maurice. 1906 – via Internet Archive.
- A Year in Russia (1907)
- Russian Essays and Stories. (1908) London: Methuen.
- Orpheus in Mayfair and Other Stories (1909) short stories
- Dead Letters (1910) satirical collection
- The Glass Mender and Other Stories (1910)
- Landmarks in Russian Literature (1910) London: Methuen.
- Diminutive Dramas (1911), Constable & Co
- The Russian People (1911)
- Letters from the Near East (1913)
- Lost Diaries (1913) fictional extracts from diaries of notable people
- The Mainsprings of Russia (1914)
- An Outline of Russian Literature at Project Gutenberg (1914/15)
- Round the World in any Number of Days (1919)
- Flying Corps Headquarters 1914–1918 (1920)
- Passing By (1921) novel
- The Puppet Show of Memory (1922) autobiography
- Overlooked (1922) short story
- Poems 1914–1919 (1923)
- C (1924) novel
- Punch and Judy and Other Essays (1924)
- Half a Minute's Silence and Other Stories (1925)
- Cat's Cradle (1925) novel
- Daphne Adeane (1926) novel
- Tinker's Leave (1927) novel
- Comfortless Memory (1928) novel
- The Coat Without Seam (1929) novel
- Robert Peckham (1930) historical novel
- In My End is My Beginning (1931) biographical novel about Mary Stuart
- Friday's Business (1932) novel
- Lost Lectures (1932) imaginary lectures
- Unreliable History (1934) omnibus collection of works
- The Lonely Lady of Dulwich (1934) novella
- Darby and Joan (1935) novel
- Have You Anything to Declare? (1936) collection of notes and quotes
- Collected Poems (1937) poetry
- Maurice Baring: A Postscript by Laura Lovat with Some Letters and Verse (1947)
- Maurice Baring Restored: Selections from His Work (1970) chosen and edited by Paul Horgan
- Dear Animated Bust: Letters to Lady Juliet Duff, France 1915-1918 (1981)
- Maurice Baring: Letters (2007) selected and edited by Jocelyn Hillgarth and Julian Jeffs
- Baring also edited The Oxford Book Of Russian Verse published by Clarendon (1924)
