= John Baring, 2nd Baron Revelstoke =

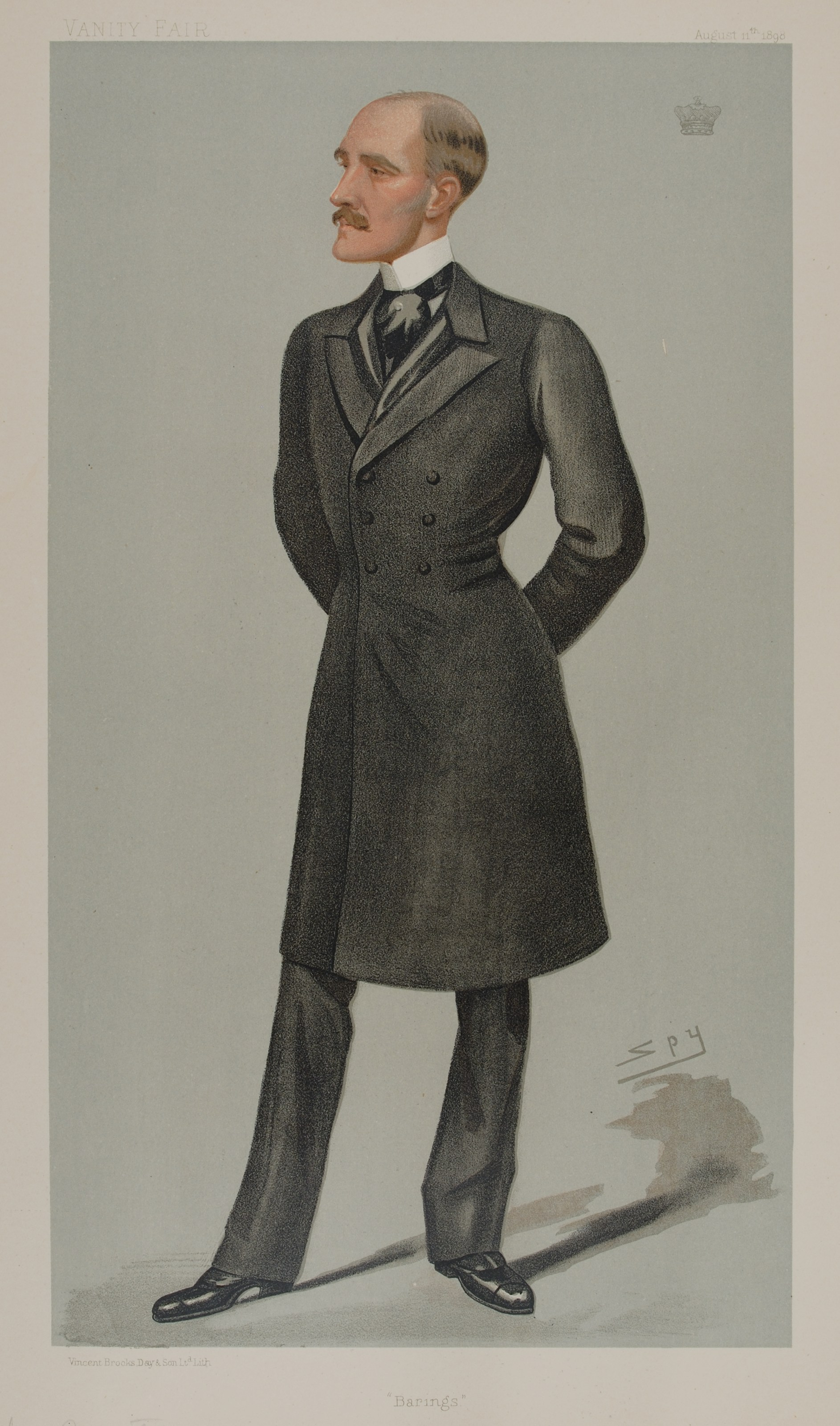
"Barings" Lord Revelstoke as caricatured by Spy (Leslie Ward) in Vanity Fair, August 1898

John Baring, 2nd Baron Revelstoke GCVO PC DL (7 September 1863 – 19 April 1929) was senior partner of Barings Bank from the 1890s until his death. John was the eldest surviving son of Edward Baring, 1st Baron Revelstoke, and a great-grandson of the firm’s founder, Francis Baring.

== Career at Barings ==
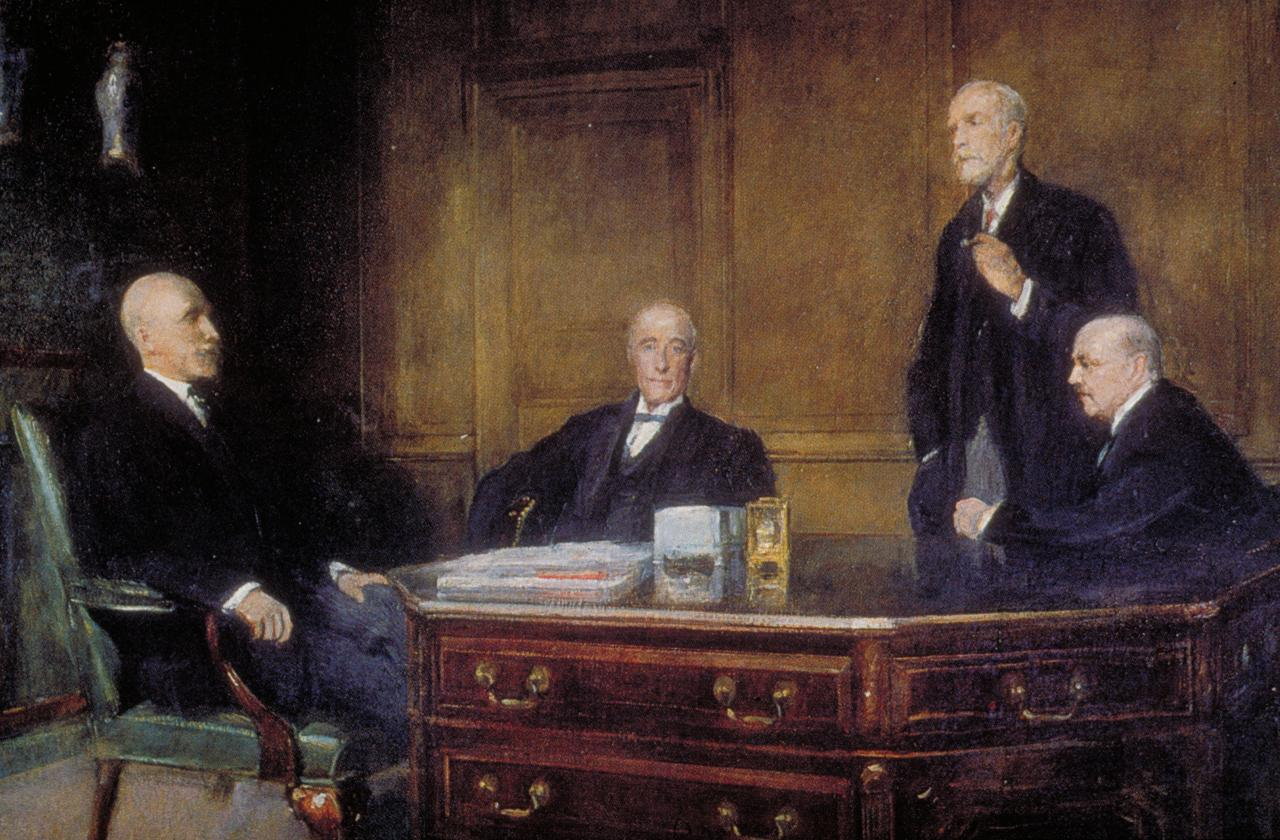
John Baring (1863-1929), second Lord Revelstoke; Cecil Baring (1864-1934), later third Lord Revelstoke; Gaspard Farrer (1860-1946) and Alfred Mildmay (1871-1944)

At the age of twenty, John left Cambridge to join the family firm. After a few years learning the basics in the counting house, he was sent on an extensive tour of North and South America to learn first-hand about Barings' international interests and meet the people he would later be dealing with. He became a partner in January 1890, less than a year before Barings nearly collapsed in the Panic of 1890. He was not implicated in that affair, so was allowed to continue as partner and played an increasingly important role in the affairs of the reorganized firm. By the outbreak of the First World War, Barings’ prestige had been fully restored under his leadership. During the War, Revelstoke was closely concerned with raising finance for the Imperial Russian government.

== Outside Appointments ==
Revelstoke held numerous appointments outside the firm. He was a director of the Bank of England from 1898 until his death; Receiver General of the Duchy of Cornwall; Minister Plenipotentiary as British financial representative at the Allied Conference in Petrograd in 1917; and a British representative to the Committee of Experts on German Reparations in 1929. He died shortly before the end of the negotiations on German Reparations held in Paris, leading to an adjournment of these.

== Personal life ==
Revelstoke lived at 3 Carlton House Terrace in London from 1904 until his death in 1929, and owned a country house in Leicestershire. He never married, although in 1906 he proposed to Nancy Langhorne (later Nancy Astor). Upon his death, his title passed to his younger brother Cecil, who was also a partner in the family banking firm for many years.

== Arms ==
Coat of arms of John Baring, 2nd Baron Revelstoke
Coronet A Coronet of a Baron Crest A Mullet Erminois between two Wings Argent Escutcheon Azure on a Fess Or a Hurt thereon a Mullet Erminois in chief a Bear's Head proper Supporters Dexter: a Bull Argent; Sinister: a Bear proper muzzled Or each charged on the shoulder with a Mullet Erminois Motto Probitate Et Labore (By uprightness and work)

Political offices
Preceded by Sir Robert Kingscote	Receiver-General of the Duchy of Cornwall; 1908–1929	Succeeded by Sir Edward Peacock
Honorary titles
Preceded by The Duke of Bedford	Lord Lieutenant of Middlesex; 1926–1929	Succeeded by The Lord Rochdale
Peerage of the United Kingdom
Preceded by Edward Baring	Baron Revelstoke; 1897–1929	Succeeded by Cecil Baring
