= Lambay Island =

Private island off the Dublin coast, Ireland

Lambay (Island)
Native name: Reachrainn (Irish)
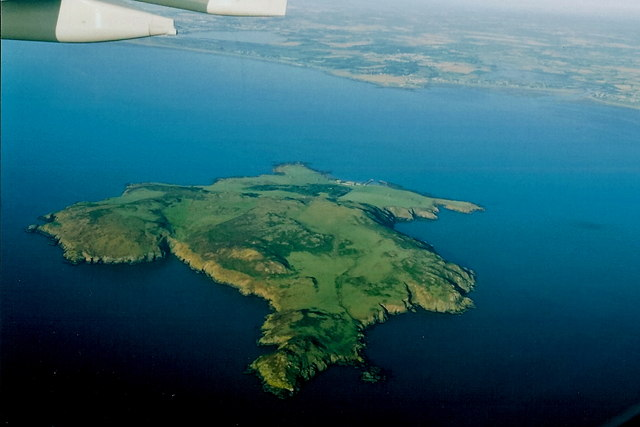

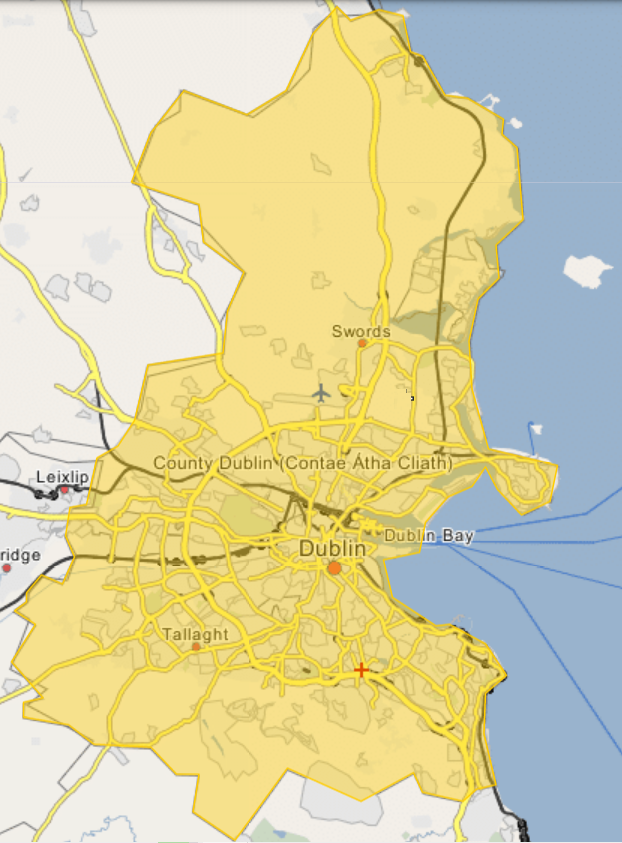
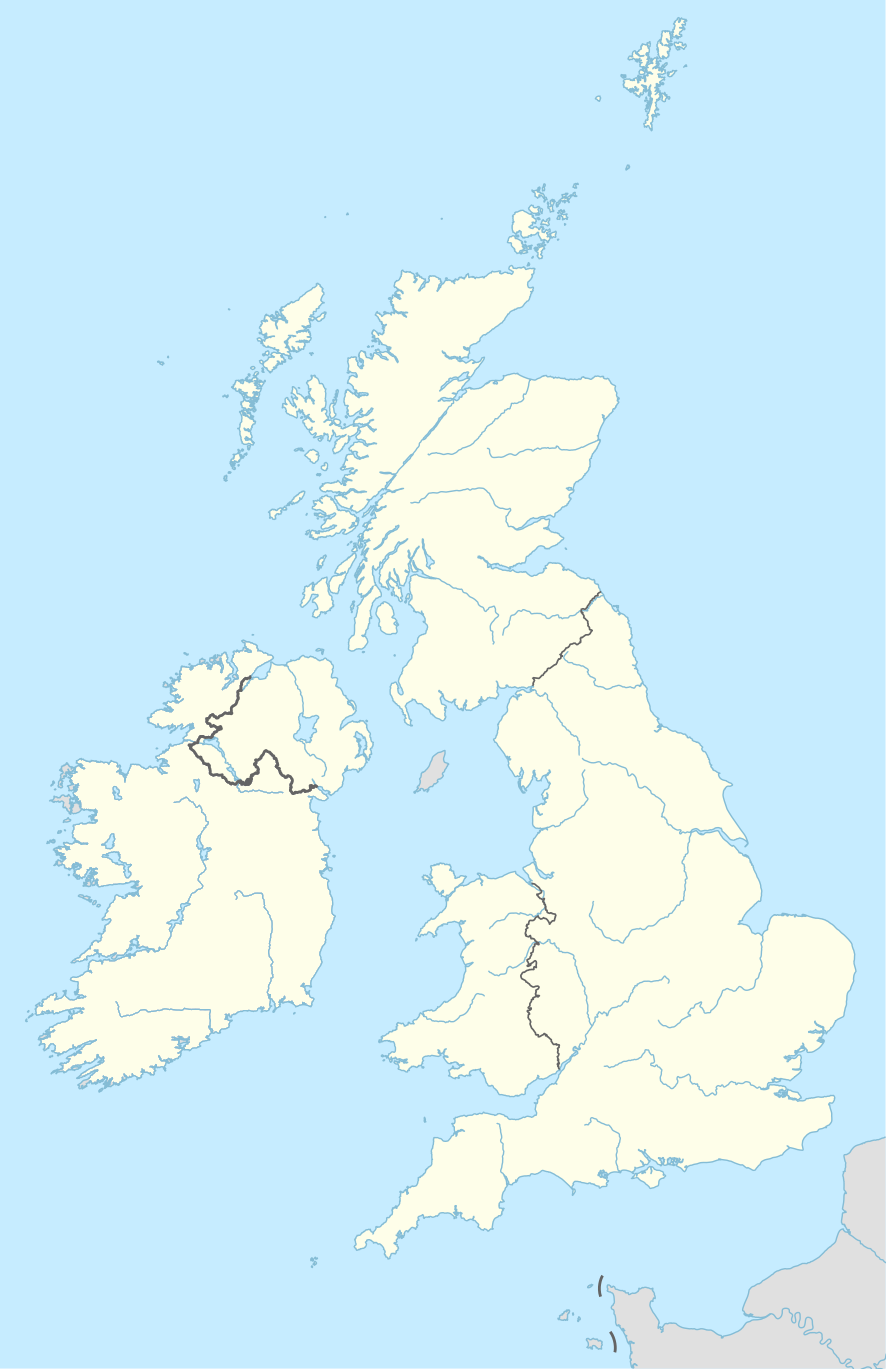
- Location within County Dublin Location within island of Ireland Location within the United Kingdom and Ireland

Geography
- Location: Irish Sea
- Coordinates: 53°29′26″N 06°00′54″W
- Area: 2.5 km^{2} (0.97 sq mi)
- Length: 2.7 km (1.68 mi)
- Width: 2.2 km (1.37 mi)
- Coastline: 10 km (6 mi)
- Highest elevation: 126 m (413 ft)
- Highest point: Knockbane

Administration
- Ireland
- Province: Leinster
- County: County Dublin
- Local government area: Fingal

Demographics
- Population: 16 (2022)
- Pop. density: 2.4/km^{2} (6.2/sq mi)

Additional information
- Eircode: K56 KP28 and K56 XK51

Lambay Island (Irish: Reachrainn), often simply Lambay (/ˈlæmbeɪ/, LAM-bay), is an island in the Irish Sea off the coast of north County Dublin, Ireland. The largest island off the east coast of Ireland, it is four kilometres (two nautical miles) offshore from the headland at Portrane, and is the easternmost point of the province of Leinster. Of volcanic origin, it has been inhabited since the prehistoric period and has been the subject of multiple archaeological studies. Lambay has notable populations of seabirds, a range of local fauna, some not found elsewhere in Ireland, and a colony of wallabies, as well as more than 300 plant varieties, and was the subject of major studies of flora and birds, and a major multidisciplinary study of flora and fauna between 1905 and 1907. The island is privately owned by a trust for members of certain branches of the Baring family and managed by the current Baron Revelstoke. It has a very small permanent population and few buildings but hosts some day visitors and short-stay guests, and there is a working farm.

== Etymology ==
The name 'Lambay' comes from Old Norse Lamb ey meaning "lamb island". The name probably originated from the practice of sending ewes to the island in Spring so they could lamb in a predator-free environment. A similar place name is Lamba in Shetland.

The Irish name for the island is Reachrainn, which is also the Irish name for Rathlin Island. The coastal settlement of Portrane faces Lambay and its name comes from Port Reachrann, the "port of Reachrainn".

== Geography ==
Lambay Island is the largest island off the east coast of Ireland. It covers about 2.5 km^{2} (0.97 sq mi). The highest point – a hill known as Knockbane – rises to 126 m (413 ft). The island's high ground lies to the east and aside from Knockbane includes Heath Hill and Tinian Hill, and in the extreme northeast, Pilot's Hill. Steep cliffs lie along the northern, eastern, and southern coasts of the island, while the western side has low-lying land and gentle slopes. Due to the island's topography and exposure to weather, the western shore is where almost all of the island's buildings are located – the Castle, coastguard cottages and guest residences, and the Catholic chapel – as well as the only harbour, while two cottages exist on hillier ground.

The island has eight named bays and a few narrow inlets, and the easternmost point is Lambay Head. The bays are, running counter-clockwise from the harbour, Talbot's Bay, named for a former owner, Carnoon Bay, Bishop's Bay, Sunk Island Bay, Tayleur Bay, Freshwater Bay, Saltpan Bay and Broad Bay. Inlets include Seal Hole. There is a sandy beach by the harbour, and several small rocky strands on the steeper coasts.

=== Geology ===
The island is of volcanic origin, and its basic geology is Lambay Volcanic Formation, mostly igneous rocks. Bedrock is a mix of andesite, tuff (from volcanic ash) and mudstone, as well as breccia, but there are beds of shales and limestones also, and loamy soil. The andesite, present across the whole area of Lambay, is primarily of the specific type Lambay porphyry.

=== Hydrology ===
A small number of wells, springs and small streams are fed by aquifers, topped up by rainfall and so varying seasonally. The wells include Trinity Well near the peak of Knockbane, and Raven Well near the central-eastern cliffs; there was also historically a spring near Raven's Well, another near the castle, and a well near Carnoon Bay. A small stream flows down into Carnoon Bay and a slightly larger into Freshwater Bay. There was also a stream to Seal Hole, which at least once had three rivulets meeting, one from Raven Well and two from marshy patches nearby, and finally, there was a flow from the vicinity of the castle to the sea near the harbour.

=== Demographics ===
The island of Ireland has 258 sometime-inhabited islands but Lambay is one of only five of these which lie off the eastern coast. The Copeland Islands off the coast of County Down are the only other islands off the east coast which remain inhabited as of 2020. The population has ranged from reports of over 140 to as few as 3. The table below reports data on Lambay's population taken from Discover the Islands of Ireland (Alex Ritsema, Collins Press, 1999) and the census of Ireland. Census data in Ireland before 1841 are not considered complete and/or reliable.

Historical population

Year	Pop.	±%
1831	84	—
1841	89	+6.0%
1851	75	−15.7%
1861	71	−5.3%
1871	88	+23.9%
1881	61	−30.7%
1891	32	−47.5%
1901	28	−12.5%

Year	Pop.	±%
1911	44	+57.1%
1926	45	+2.3%
1936	32	−28.9%
1946	31	−3.1%
1951	21	−32.3%
1956	34	+61.9%
1961	25	−26.5%
1966	24	−4.0%

Year	Pop.	±%
1971	24	+0.0%
1979	8	−66.7%
1981	12	+50.0%
1986	10	−16.7%
1991	8	−20.0%
1996	8	+0.0%
2002	6	−25.0%
2006	6	+0.0%

Year	Pop.	±%
2011	6	+0.0%
2014	3	−50.0%
2016	9	+200.0%
2019	7	−22.2%
2020	8	+14.3%
2022	16	+100.0%

Source: (-2011) John Chambers. "Islands – Change in Population 1841 – 2011". irishislands.info. (2014) Bielenberg, Kim (20 June 2014). "To rent: a piece of paradise off Dublin's coast". Irish Independent. "In the winter .. inhabited by as few as three people – Lord Revelstoke and the two farm workers – but the population rises in the summer as members of the extended family come..." (2019) Lynskey, Rory (15 April 2019). "Have you ever wondered what is on Lambay Island? Well, it's time you found out". Dublin Live. (2020) "Host (Lambay Island)". WWOOF Ireland. "Alex and Brooke live 'off-grid' with their 2 toddlers on Lambay; the island has 4 full-time employees engaged in farming / tourism."

== Administration and designations ==
Lambay Island forms a townland in the civil parish of Portraine, in the barony of Nethercross, within the modern county of Fingal and in the traditional County Dublin.

For electoral purposes, it is in the electoral division of Donabate, within the Swords ward for local authority polls, and the Dublin Fingal constituency for national elections.

The island, a Natura-2000 site, has both Special Protection Area (SPA) and Special Area of Conservation (SAC) designations, as well as being a pNHA. The island is also wholly enclosed by the Rockabill to Dalkey Island SAC which references reef communities and harbour porpoises.

There are, as of 2020, 26 National Monuments (sites on the Record of Monuments and Places), and one possible site.

== Flora and fauna ==
The island was discovered to hold 90 species not seen elsewhere in Ireland, and 5 new to science, when studied in 1905–1906.

=== Flora ===
The island is home to 308 plant types. However, surveys have found that 33 are invasive species that have arisen as weeds from agriculture or horticulture.

=== Fauna ===
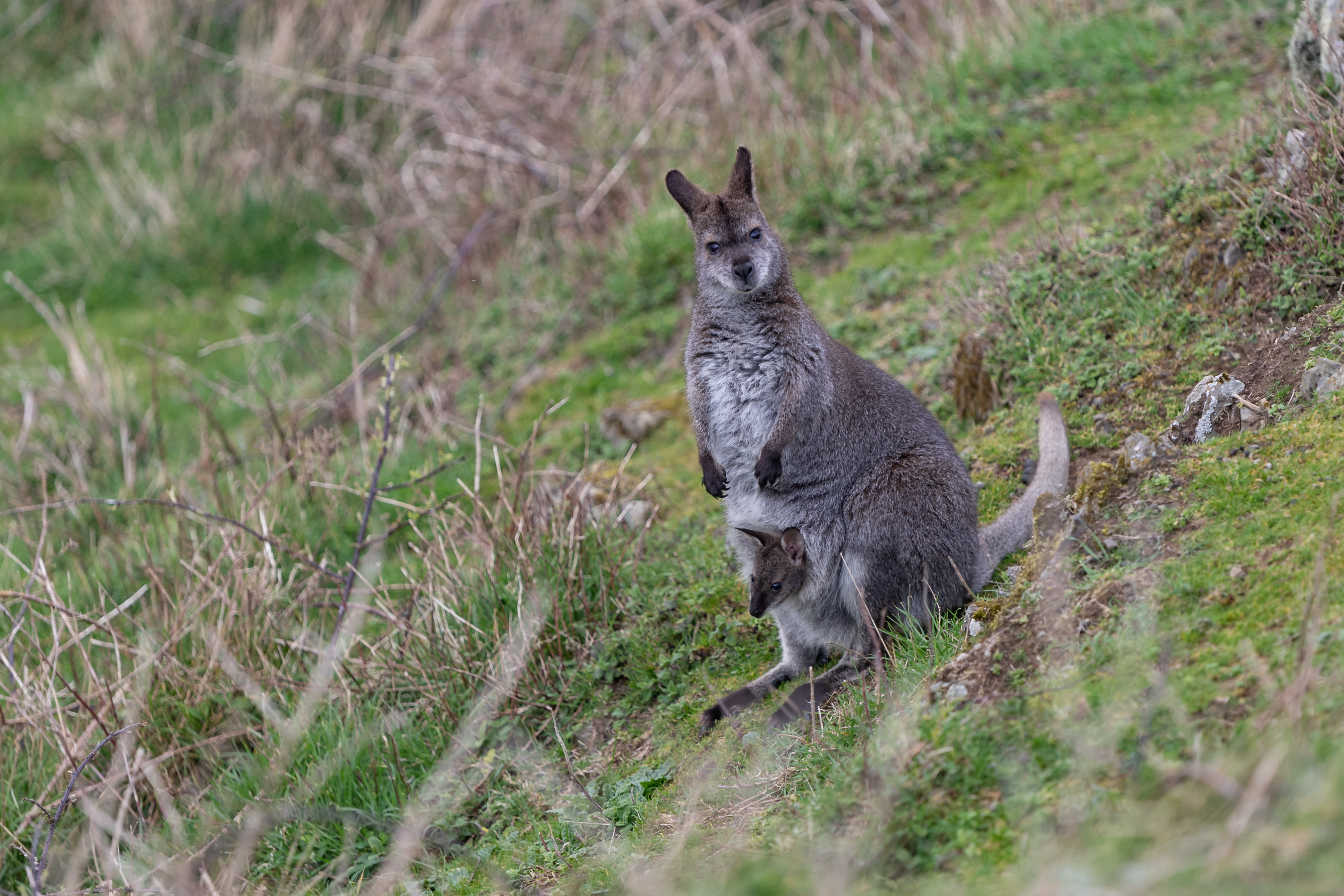
Red-necked wallabies were first released on the island in the 1950s.

The island supports one of the largest seabird colonies in Ireland, with more than 50,000 common guillemots, 5,000 kittiwakes, 3,500 razorbills, 2,500 pairs of herring gulls, as well as smaller numbers of puffins, Manx shearwaters, fulmars, and greylag geese.

North Atlantic sea mammals such as grey seals annually pup on the island. The island has a substantial population of rabbits. Ireland's most common rodent, the brown rat is present, as is Ireland's only self-sustaining long-term population of the black rat, with the presence of the former keeping the numbers of the latter under control.

Rockabill and Lambay islands are the best places in County Dublin to see harbour porpoises.

The island also possesses some uncommon invertebrates – the major survey in 1905-1906 discovered species new to science. Among these were three species of earthworm (including Henlea hibernica), a bristletail (Praemachilis hibernica) and a mite (Trachyuropoda hibernica). The earthworm aspect of the study found 34 species, of which 18 were previously unseen in Ireland, including the three new to science as a whole, and noted that the average size of specimens was smaller than on the mainland by a material amount. A degree of local variation was also noted, and for example, one type was particularly prominent near the Raven's Well.

=== Domestic and non-native fauna ===
There are also non-native red-necked wallabies, introduced by Rupert Baring in the 1950s, and augmented by a surplus from Dublin Zoo in the 1980s, numbering perhaps around 100 in 2017. The wallabies breed well, and some moderate culling is required to keep the population under control. Fallow deer were introduced, and by the mid-2000s formed a herd of about 200. There is also a herd of farmed cattle on the island, and a flock of sheep.

== History ==
=== Prehistory ===
The island was of some significance in the Neolithic period in Ireland as a ground stone quarrying and production site for axes. Two outcrops of andesite, or Lambay porphyry as the specific rock variety is more commonly known, were utilised. The quarry site is unusual in Ireland for being the only Neolithic stone axe quarry with evidence for all stages of production, from quarrying to final polishing.

=== Classical period ===
In the 1st century AD the Ancient Roman writer Pliny knew about the island and referred to it as Limnus or Limni. Its Irish name, Reachra, was eventually joined by a Norse name based on the root word ey for island. A number of Iron Age burials were discovered on the island in 1927, during works on the island's harbour. The finds included a number of Romano-British items, and the site has been interpreted as possible evidence for the arrival of a small group of refugees from Brigantia, fleeing the Romans from 71 to 74AD.

Ptolemy's Geography in the 2nd century AD may have been describing Lambay when it mentions Εδρου (Edrou). PIE *sed- 'to sit, settle' had descendants in many languages, including Greek ἑδρα (hedra) 'sitting place' whose many specific uses included 'base for ships'.

=== Early Medieval ===
St. Columba is reputed to have established a monastic settlement on Lambay c. 530 AD, which passed to Colman and a line of successor abbots and at least one bishop. The religious settlement was raided by Vikings in 795, resulting in the church and buildings being ransacked and burned. Surveys in the early 20th century found remains of an enclosure to the south of the present chapel, and these, and modern satellite photography, suggested it was a moated site.

=== Late Medieval ===
Sitric, a Danish King of Dublin, granted Lambay to Christ Church Cathedral, and in 1181 Prince John granted it to the Archbishops of Dublin. This was reconfirmed by King Edward in 1337 and by King Richard in 1394. A later archbishop gave the rents of the island to the nuns of the Augustine Grace Dieu Abbey and school near Swords, County Dublin for the upkeep of their establishment. He also gave the tithes of Lambay's rabbits to the nuns – at that time the rabbit taxes were worth 100 shillings a year.

In 1467, it was provided by statute that the Earl of Worcester, then Lord Deputy, be granted Lambay to build a fortress for England's protection against the Spaniards, French and Scots. Worcester paid the Archbishop of Dublin 40 shillings per annum and though he had a licence to build a castle on Lambay it is not certain that any fortification was actually built.

=== Early modern ===
During the English Reformation in the mid 16th century, George Browne, the English Augustinian Archbishop of Dublin gave Lambay to John Challoner, the first Secretary of State for Ireland, for a rent of £6.13.4. The conditions were that Challoner would within six years build a village, castle and harbour for the benefit of fishermen and as a protection against smugglers. He was to inhabit Lambay "with a colony of honest men". He was a very active man who worked four mines for silver and copper and bred falcons on the island's many cliffs. During this period, Lambay Castle – a small blockhouse or fort – was built on the western side of the island.

Throughout most of the reign of Elizabeth I, Challoner owned Lambay but in 1611 the island was granted to Sir William Ussher and his heirs. James Ussher, later the Anglican Archbishop of Armagh, took up residence on Lambay in 1626. By 1650 he had moved to London; he was highly respected by Lord Protector Oliver Cromwell and was buried in Westminster Abbey. The island remained in the possession of the Ussher family, renting from the Church of Ireland See of Dublin, under Crown tenure, for 200 years.

During the Williamite war in Ireland, the island was used as an internment camp for Irish soldiers. More than one thousand of them were imprisoned there after the Battle of Aughrim in 1691; some died of wounds and starvation.

In the 17th century, exploratory mining was again undertaken on the island but it did not develop into an industrial activity.

=== Georgian and Victorian era ===
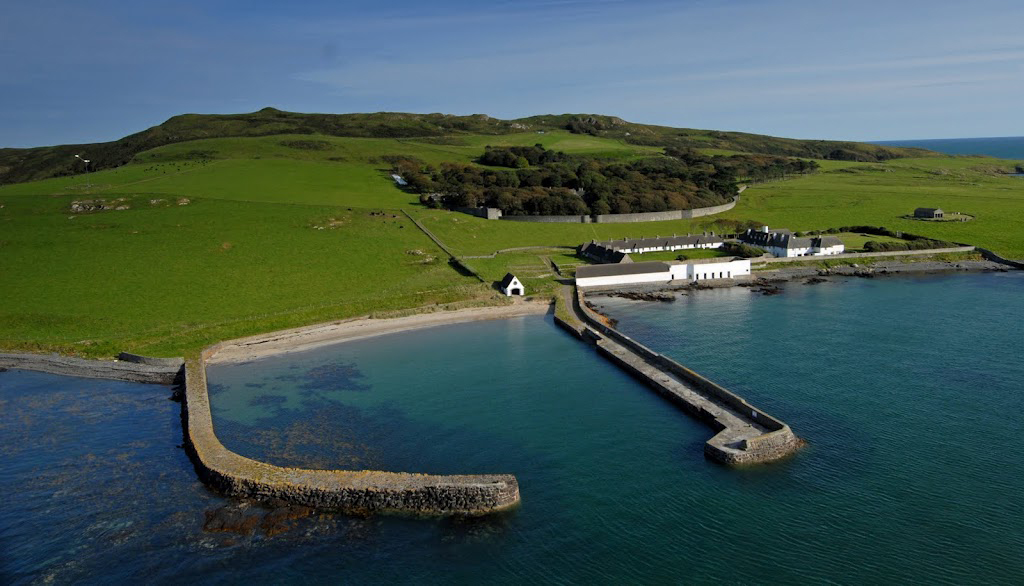
An easterly view of Lambay harbour

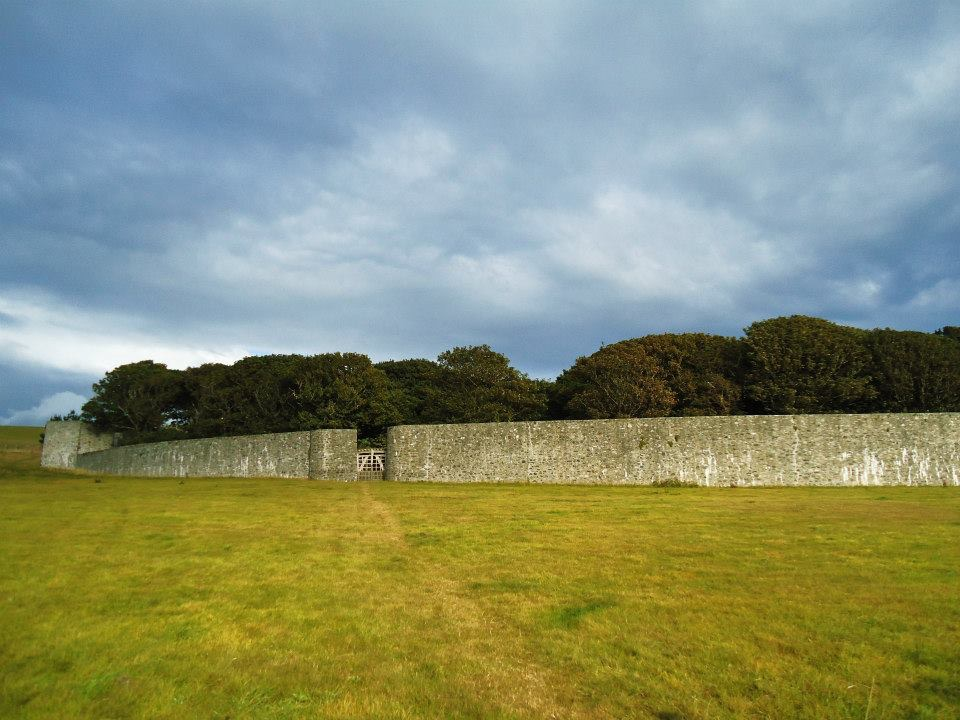
Castle Wall

In 1805, the leasehold of Lambay was inherited by Sir William Wolseley, and in 1814 it was acquired by the aristocratic Talbot family of Malahide. In the period following the Talbot de Malahide acquisition both a Catholic chapel and a national (primary) school were built.

On 21 January 1854, the iron-hulled RMS Tayleur struck the island's rocks and sank just hours into her maiden voyage from Liverpool to Perth, Australia. It was chartered by the White Star Line and was one of the largest merchant ships of her day. Of the 650 people on board, mostly families emigrating, 380 people died, though most of the 71 crew survived. The ship's crew, only 37 being trained seamen, thought they were sailing south when in fact they were heading west, partly due to problems with the compass and the mass of iron in the ship. There were also language issues, with many of the crew being Chinese with little English, and unable to fully understand the commanding officers.

In 1860 the existing farmers were removed by the Talbot family, who wanted to make the island a dedicated hunting ground, though they were later replaced with English and Scottish tenants. After selling his property, Portrane House, on the mainland nearby, Count James Consedine bought Lambay in 1888 to develop the island as a hunting retreat.

=== Baring family ===
In April 1904, Lambay was bought from a Mrs Parr by Cecil Baring, later 3rd Baron Revelstoke, a member of the Baring banking family, and a director in the New York office. Baring, also a classical scholar and naturalist, noticed it advertised for sale in The Field and bought it – for either £5,250 or £9,000 – for himself and his new bride, Maude, daughter of tobacco millionaire Pierre Lorillard IV.

The island's main residence was in poor condition, so Cecil brought the prominent architect Sir Edwin Lutyens to see it in 1905, and later hired him to work on its renovation. Lutyens supervised rebuilding and extension in the Arts and Crafts style, completing the first works by 1910 and became a family friend, returning there throughout the remainder of his life, adding to his architectural designs, and guiding construction and renovation in multiple locations over the course of 30 years or so. Aside from the castle, these works included the dwelling known as the White House and a family mausoleum. Cecil Baring and Lutyens engaged Gertrude Jekyll to work on tree planting, notably of sycamores, and the gardens near the castle.

Cecil Baring, who inherited his brother's title of Lord Revelstoke in April 1929, lived on the island till his death in 1934. He and his wife Maude are buried in the family mausoleum on Lambay, along with their son Rupert Baring, and grandsons John and James Baring. The mausoleum, which was also designed by Lutyens, forms part of the circular rampart wall around the Castle and is engraved with a poem Cecil wrote in memory of Maude when she died.

Rupert Baring was born just after the island residence was completed, in 1911, and Edwin Lutyens was his godfather and a major figure in his childhood, later explaining many of his architectural principles to the future Lord Revelstoke. Rupert, an episode of whose life was filmed as The Duchess of Duke Street, only worked two years in the family business; the branch of the family holding the island had no further involvement with Barings Bank after the 1920s. Rupert managed the island from 1934 to 1994, and in the 1980s he created a family trust to hold the island for his close relatives and descendants. Rupert was succeeded in the title by his two sons in turn: John and James Cecil. James, who had done pioneering work in Internet technology, engaged with a team of consultants to develop a concept for the island as a base for testing of renewable energy technology, including tidal power generation, and for associated education and hospitality business potential.

James was succeeded by his eldest son, Alexander "Alex" Rupert, in 2012. Alexander Baring commented that he was engaged but isolated island life led to a break-off, but he subsequently married and lives there with his wife and small children. The island is managed with the aid of a small staff. Having been overseen by a cousin, Margaret Kelly, from 1994 to 2012, it is now managed directly by Lord Revelstoke and his half-sister Millie (Miranda) Baring.

=== New strategy, 2011 ===
After a warning about the depletion of its cash funding from the estate trust in 2012, and discussions in 2012 and 2013, a revised plan for the island's operations was put into play. This included a planning application in 2013 for modifications to the castle, which at that time had just one working toilet. The works proposed, noted by the architects as respecting the island's architecture and ambience, included the conversion of two rooms to bathrooms, the installation of a modern heating system, new freshwater and wastewater systems, a new wind turbine and some solar panels. It was noted that limitations on electrical storage capacity meant that there was only power enough for essential lighting, refrigeration and a single washing machine for the island, along with basic communication, and no capacity for most powered kitchen equipment, or even hair-dryers or a tumble-dryer. The application drew objections from several non-resident members of the family, who felt that it was too commercial in nature, and did not take enough account of the conservation needs of the buildings. Following discussions with Fingal County Council, permission was subsequently granted with conditions.

In 2015, a supporting club was launched, and a whiskey project developed. In subsequent years both accommodation and visiting arrangements were relaunched. In September 2018 Prince Edward visited the island and attended a dinner there.

==== Whiskey project ====
A special-purpose company for the whiskey project, which in a later phase may lead to the island's first industrial facility, a small distillery, was registered in February 2017. It is a joint venture between the island's holding company and the Camus Cognac family, which also had discussions with the owners of Slane Castle, who also launched a whiskey brand. The whiskey is produced in Ireland, with water added from one of the island's Trinity Well, and some batches are matured on the island. The Lambay Island Whiskey brand was launched on the Irish market, with a boat trip towards Lambay and an event in Howth, in April 2018. The venture posted a 1.2 million euro loss for 2018 but had built up inventory of around 3 million euro, and was distributing through international duty free and national market channels, primarily in the US. Further launches have followed, including in Moscow, Russia, and the brand has also sponsored a local boat race.

Application for planning permission for a micro-distillery for whiskey and gin, for small batch production in spring and autumn when the island's water supply is strongest, was made in 2019, and approved in principle, subject to clarification around waste disposal.

== Archaeology ==
The island has been the subject of archaeological study over decades and on many occasions. One area of special study fell within the Irish Stone Axe project and included digs of between two weeks and two months from 1993 to 2001. This identified a stone axe factory, using Lambay porphyry, near the centre of the island, and also made findings about burial of Neolithic pottery and flint.

Multiple human burial sites have also been found and the remains of at least two promontory forts.

== Wrecks ==
There are around fifty wrecks in the waters around Lambay. The RMS Tayleur, under 18 metres of water around 40 metres off the southeastern coast, is the one most often dived, but such dives do require a licence from the National Monuments Branch of the Office of Public Works, as the wreck is over 100 years old. Another notable wreck is that of The Shamrock, under the stream at Freshwater Bay, north of Carrickdorish Rock; sunk in 1916, this ship carried phosphorus shells and explosives, and steps were cut in the rock nearby to facilitate the salvage and removal of these. Other wrecks include, on the northern coast, The Strathey, a steamship lost in 1900, and a 1920s loss just beyond Harp Ear.

== Religion ==
After St Columba (Colmcille) from Ulster reputedly established a monastic settlement on Lambay in the 6th century, he passed its rule to Colman McRoi, later also a saint. Some sources state that Colman, who is venerated by Catholic, Anglican and Orthodox churches, actually founded the monastery on what was then called Reachrain, with Colmcille's blessing. Colman has his feast day on 16 June. The monastery endured for over two centuries and at least one of its abbots also held the rank of Bishop. It was raided in the first recorded attack by Vikings on Ireland, in 795. It ceases to be recorded thereafter.

In 1833, a new chapel was built under the auspices of the Catholic Church at Rush, with the permission of the Talbots of Malahide. The Talbots also contributed financially. The chapel was consecrated in a major local event. Tragically some people died on the return of boats to the mainland after the event. The chapel functioned for all Christians on the island thereafter. It was modified with Doric columns by Edwin Lutyens in the 1910s. It is still attended by the Baring family and other island residents on Sundays.

== Buildings ==
=== Lambay Castle ===
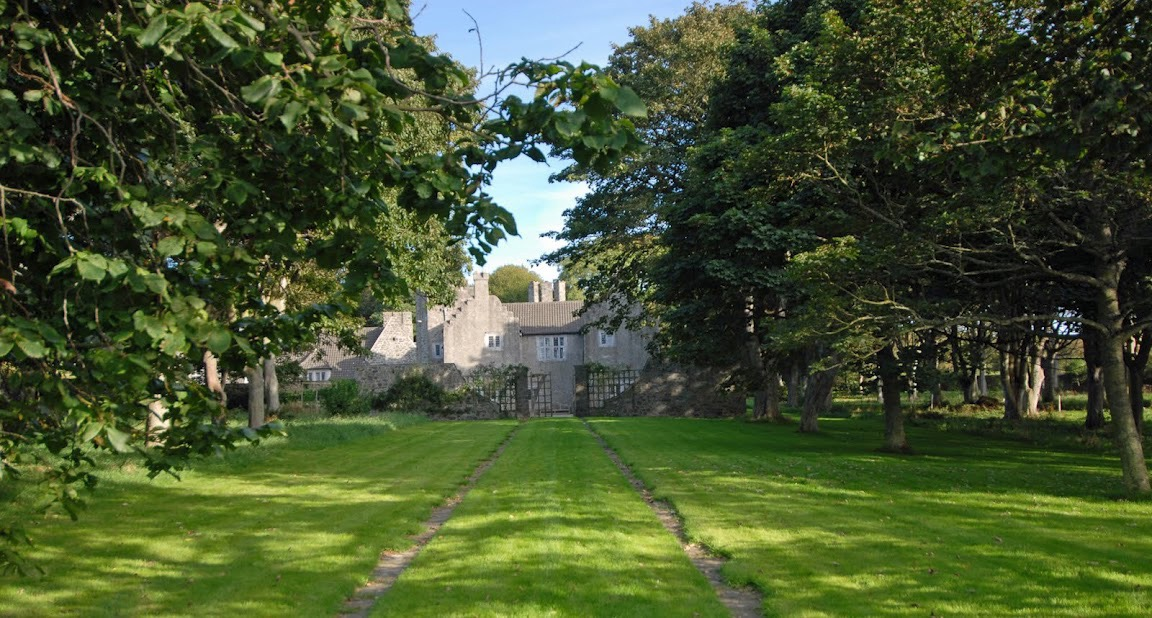
Castle approach

A small late 16th-century fort with battlemented gables, possibly incorporating a 15th-century blockhouse, was transformed by Sir Edwin Lutyens into a romantic castle for the Hon. Cecil Baring, afterwards 3rd Lord Revelstoke. Baring had been working in the US when he fell in love with the wife of one of his co-directors. She divorced her husband and married Baring. He bought the island for £5,250 in 1904 as a place to escape to with his young wife, Maude Louise Lorillard, the daughter of Pierre Lorillard, the tobacco millionaire, and the first American to win The Derby.

The story of Cecil and Maude's early life on the island inspired Julian Slade's musical Free as Air.

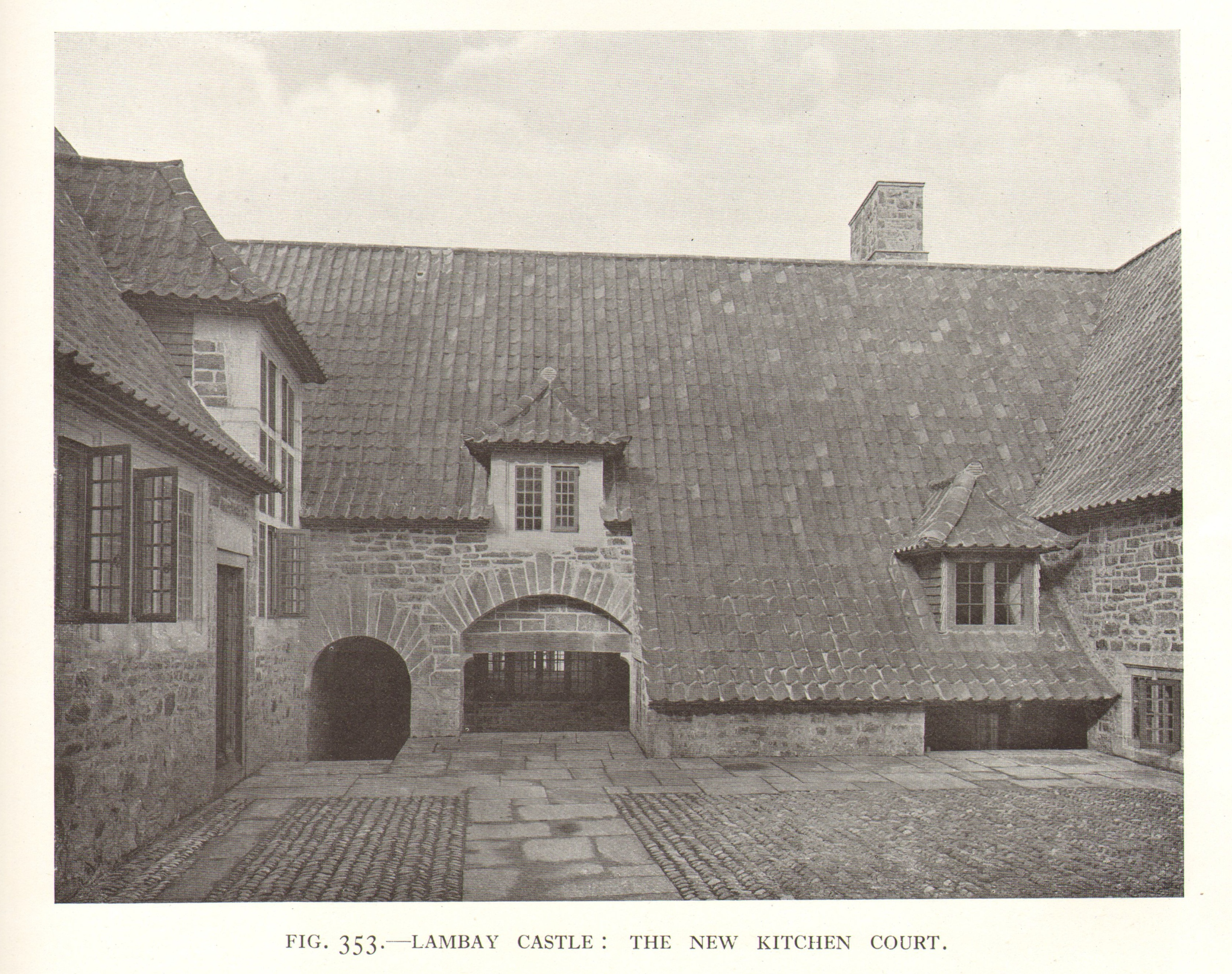
The new Kitchen Court, from Weaver(1913)

Lutyens made the old fort habitable and built a quadrangle of kitchens, bathrooms and extra bedrooms adjoining it, with roofs of grey Dutch pantiles sweeping down almost to the ground. He also built a circular curtain wall or enceinte surrounding the castle and its garden, with a bastioned gateway; this wall serves the practical purpose of a windbreak, enabling trees and plants to grow inside which would not grow outside. Everything is of a silvery grey stone. The rooms in the castle have vaulted ceilings and stone fireplaces; there is a stone staircase with many curves and an underground gallery in the new quadrangle. The work was of high quality but one small omission led to problems after a few years, namely a lack of rainwater channels.

=== The White House ===
Close to the harbour is the White House, a roughly horse-shoe shaped house with high roofs and whitewashed walls, which Lutyens designed in the 1930s for Lord Revelstoke's daughters Daphne and Calypso and their families, while the castle and island were left to his only son Rupert Baring.

=== Coastguard cottages ===
A row of small cottages, once for guards, and later used by coastguards, is also near the harbour. At least one is, as of 2020, available for rental.

=== Harbour and approach ===
Lutyens also designed the harbour approach, featuring curved, step-like terraces inspired by Rome’s now-vanished Ripetta. The design incorporates a series of ellipses, reflecting the circle’s long-standing symbolism of welcome, unity, and completeness. Characteristically, after ascending the grand Baroque steps, visitors must cross an open field before reaching the curtain wall, with the entrance gateway deliberately concealed from their initial view.

=== Chapel ===
On a small cliff-top near the White House is a 19th-century Roman Catholic chapel. It has a portico of tapering stone columns, added by Lutyens, and a barrel-vaulted ceiling. Inside are various religious symbols and artefacts made by members of the family, including the little stained-glass window.

=== National school ===
The school building was located within the castle's curtilage, on a path from the castle to the harbour. At peak operations, in the 1840s, it had 40 children enrolled. It is not currently in operation.

== Operations today ==
The island is still privately owned by the Revelstoke Trust, a discretionary Baring family trust. Alex and Brooke Baring and their children and a small staff are, as of 2020, the only permanent residents, sometimes joined by Miranda Baring. There is an estate unlimited company, a company limited by guarantee for the supporting club, and a company for the whiskey project. The estate company has as directors the current lord and a cousin, the botanist and Director of the National Botanic Gardens of Ireland, Matthew Jebb as well as a House of Lords assistant, while the club company has as directors Alex and Miranda Baring.

The estate includes domestic extensions to the old Castle, farm buildings, a row of former Coast Guard (Revenue Police) cottages, a larger house called the Bothy, the White House (a family guesthouse), the sole harbour with its boathouse, and a distinctive open-air real tennis court, the only one remaining in Ireland (there was one in the old University College Dublin complex on Earlsfort Terrace, adjacent to the National Concert Hall, in the part scheduled to be part of the Experimentation Station). There is a Roman Catholic chapel located on an isolated promontory southwest of the castle. All architecture was either designed or renovated by Sir Edwin Lutyens.

=== The farm ===
There is a farm, working without pesticides or chemicals, and with Galloway cows and a flock of sheep. Following previous ventures with sheep, including the Mayo Mule breed, as of 2025 the current flock are Lleyn. It meets organic standards except for certain veterinary aspects, and is operated, under a REPS scheme, so as to disturb native flora and fauna as little as possible. It has operated as an agritourism destination, and accepted WWOOFers as volunteers. The farm operation also works with the island's fallow deer and wallabies.

There is a reference to seaweed processing in past times, but no significant use of kelp or seaweed is mentioned in recent times, other than the fallow deer eating it.

=== Energy ===
The island has no power or communication cables from the mainland, and about 75% of its energy needs are supplied by solar panels, supported by a wind turbine, and with limited battery capacity and a backup generator system.

=== Access and guest accommodation ===
The island is accessible by invitation only, as of 2020 mainly from the marina at Malahide, and occasionally from Rogerstown Estuary, where the Trust owns a pier and associated building at the southwestern edge of Rush, as well as other launching points in Rush, and Skerries Harbour, all lying north of Dublin Bay. There is a half-kilometre airstrip, which can be used by light aeroplanes of up to six seats, and landing places for helicopters.

Since at least 2016 there has been a cottage available to rent, and the White House is available for larger groups known to the family and for retreats and corporate training events.

=== The Island Club ===
Around 2015 a supporters club was established. This was for people who believed in the island's importance for heritage and wildlife, and who wanted to meet with like-minded people, and retreat from busy city life. A small group of pioneer members was joined by Irish politician Conor Lenihan. Lenihan had had experience promoting Russia's "constructed technopark" – a sort of mini-Silicon Valley. The club has multiple levels of membership and promotes "think ins" and "off-grid breaks" for members. It has links to the Century Club in Soho, London.

== Sport and leisure ==
=== Real tennis ===
There is a real tennis court on the shore near the harbour. It was built in 1922 and is one of only two remaining in Ireland, and the only accessible one.

=== Visiting / walking groups ===
While the island is not open to casual visiting or landing of boats, groups with interests in gardening, architecture and birds are facilitated, weather permitting, and walking tours have been arranged for some years by a boatman operating Skerries Sea Tours with his family.

=== Aquasports ===
Due to its deep surrounding waters, the island attracts scuba divers and fishermen, as well as lobster-potters.

=== Other sports ===
There is a disused lawn tennis court and there was a small golf course also.

The winners of the 1921 Gordon Bennett Gas Balloon Race managed to land on Lambay after taking off from Brussels, Belgium. Captains Paul Armbruster and Louis Ansermier, from Switzerland, landed on the island after flying 756 km (470 mi) at a maximum altitude of 3,600 m (11,800 ft) during a flight of 27 hours and 23 minutes.

There is an athletics club named after Lambay Island.

== Popular culture ==
According to the Revelstoke records on the island, Lambay Castle is the location where Michael Powell wrote his screenplay for Black Narcissus (1947).

== See also ==
- List of abbeys and priories in Ireland (County Dublin)
- List of volcanoes in the Republic of Ireland
- Copeland Islands, County Down, Northern Ireland
- Ireland's Eye – a small currently uninhabited island off the coast of Howth, County Dublin
- Dalkey Island – a small uninhabited island off the south Dublin coast
