= East baronets of Calcutta (1823) =

Escutcheon of the East baronets of Calcutta

The East baronetcy of Calcutta was created in the Baronetage of the United Kingdom for Edward Hyde East on 25 April 1823. He was Member of Parliament for Great Bedwyn (1792–1796) and Winchester (1823–1831). His son, the 2nd baronet Sir James Buller East, was also MP for Winchester (1831–1832) and (1835–1864).

== East baronets of Calcutta, India (1823) ==
- Sir Edward Hyde East, 1st Baronet (1764–1847).
- Sir James Buller East, 2nd Baronet (1789–1878), extinct on his death.

== See also ==
For the Clayton-East and Clayton-East-Clayton baronets of Marden Park, see Clayton baronets.

== Notes ==
Baronetage of the United Kingdom
| Preceded by Arbuthnot baronets | East baronets of Calcutta; 25 April 1823 | Succeeded by Forbes baronets |
