= Arthur Robert Naghten =

British politician

Arthur Robert Naghten MP

Member of Parliament for Winchester
- In office 3 February 1874 – 2 April 1880 Serving with William Barrow Simonds
- Preceded by: William Barrow Simonds; John Bonham-Carter
- Succeeded by: Francis Baring; Richard Moss

Personal details
- Born: 23 April 1829
- Died: 7 August 1881 (aged 52)
- Party: Conservative
- Spouse: Dorothea Charlton (m. 1859)

Arthur Robert Naghten (23 April 1829 – 7 August 1881) was a British Conservative politician.

He was the son of Thomas Naghten of Crofton House, Fareham, Hampshire and his wife Maria née Lang, they lived at Blighmont, Millbrook, Southampton.

He was commissioned as a First Lieutenant in the Hampshire Militia Artillery on 3 September 1853 when the unit was first raised. He was promoted to Captain on 3 August 1859, and received the honorary rank of Lieutenant-Colonel on 14 April 1875. He resigned on 19 December 1877.

He was elected MP for Winchester in 1874 but did not stand for re-election at the next election in 1880.

Parliament of the United Kingdom
Preceded by William Barrow Simonds; John Bonham-Carter	Member of Parliament for Winchester; 1874 – 1880; With: William Barrow Simonds	Succeeded by Francis Baring; Richard Moss
