= Robert Archer =

Robert Archer may refer to:

- Robert Archer (English politician) (fl. 1407–1411), MP for Winchester
- Robert Archer (Australian politician), for Electoral district of Ringwood (Tasmania)

== See also ==
- Bob Archer (1899–1982), British footballer
