= Gerry Malone =

British Conservative politician (born 1950)

Minister of State for Health
- In office 20 July 1994 – May 1997
- Prime Minister: John Major
- Preceded by: Brian Mawhinney
- Succeeded by: Alan Milburn

Deputy Chairman of the Conservative Party
- In office May 1992 – July 1994 Serving with Angela Rumbold
- Leader: John Major
- Preceded by: Angela Rumbold
- Succeeded by: Angela Rumbold; Michael Dobbs; John Maples

Assistant Government Whip
- In office 10 February 1986 – 15 June 1987
- Prime Minister: Margaret Thatcher

Member of Parliament for Winchester
- In office 9 April 1992 – 8 April 1997
- Preceded by: John Browne
- Succeeded by: Mark Oaten

Member of Parliament for Aberdeen South
- In office 9 June 1983 – 18 May 1987
- Preceded by: Iain Sproat
- Succeeded by: Frank Doran

Personal details
- Born: 21 July 1950 (age 76) Glasgow, Scotland
- Party: Conservative
- Education: St Aloysius' College, Glasgow, University of Glasgow

Peter Gerald "Gerry" Malone (born 21 July 1950) is a British Conservative Party politician who served as a member of Parliament (MP) from 1983 to 1987 and again from 1992 to 1997.

== Early life ==
Born in Glasgow, Malone was educated at St Aloysius' College, Glasgow, and attended the University of Glasgow.

== Early career ==
=== Glasgow candidacies ===
He was the Conservative candidate at the February 1974 general election for Glasgow Provan, where he was defeated by Labour's Hugh Brown. He made other unsuccessful attempts to be elected to the House of Commons at Glasgow Pollok at the October 1974 general election, Roxburgh, Peebles and Selkirk at the 1979 general election, and the Glasgow Hillhead by-election in 1982 (where he lost the traditionally Conservative seat to Roy Jenkins of the Social Democratic Party).

=== MP for Aberdeen South ===
He was elected as MP for Aberdeen South at the 1983 general election, in a landslide victory for the Conservative Party, but lost the seat to Frank Doran of Labour at the 1987 general election. During this time he served as an assistant Government whip, from 10 February 1986 to 15 June 1987.

== Re-entering Parliament ==
=== MP for Winchester ===
He re-entered Parliament in 1992, representing the "safe" Conservative seat of Winchester.

In May 1992 Malone became a deputy chairman of the Conservative Party, joining incumbent Dame Angela Rumbold in the post. He left the post in July 1994 and was succeeded by Rumbold, Michael Dobbs and John Maples.

He was appointed a Minister of State at the Department of Health in 1994, when Virginia Bottomley was the secretary of state.

=== 1997 contested seat of Winchester ===
Malone unexpectedly lost his Winchester seat at the 1997 general election by two votes, to the Liberal Democrat candidate Mark Oaten. Malone challenged the result in the high court, and it was declared void, causing a by-election. Malone trailed Oaten by 21,566 votes in the resulting by-election.

== Commercial chairmanships ==
Malone was chairman of Regent-GM, a supplier of generic drugs to the National Health Service (NHS) and a subsidiary of Nadhmi Auchi's General Mediterranean Holding. The company was wound up in 2004 after being accused of colluding with five other pharmaceuticals companies to overcharge the NHS for drugs.

Malone served until September 2014 as a non-executive chairman of Ultrasis, which specialises in computerised cognitive behavioural therapy software.

He is currently chairman of a range of US mutual funds and serves on the board of the Washington-based Mutual Funds Directors Forum (MFDF); Malone is a director of two US healthcare companies, Bionik Labs and Medality Medical.

== Writer and broadcaster ==
Malone was Scottish editor of The Sunday Times from 1987 to 1990 and a broadcaster on BBC Radio Scotland and Radio Clyde from 1987 to 1992. He is currently opera critic of Reaction.life, an online news, commentary and arts publication.

Parliament of the United Kingdom
Preceded by Iain Sproat	Member of Parliament for Aberdeen South; 1983–1987	Succeeded by Frank Doran
Preceded by John Browne	Member of Parliament for Winchester; 1992–1997	Succeeded by Mark Oaten
Political offices
Preceded by	Assistant Government Whip; 1986–1987	Succeeded by
Preceded by Brian Mawhinney	Minister of State for Health; 1994–1997	Succeeded by Alan Milburn
Party political offices
Preceded by Angela Rumbold	Deputy Chairman of the Conservative Party; 1992–1994; With: Dame Angela Rumbold	Succeeded by Angela Rumbold; Michael Dobbs; John Maples
Media offices
Preceded by Andrew Neil	Editor of The European; 1998	Magazine closed
