= Caplyn =

Caplyn is a surname. Notable people with the surname include:

- John Caplyn (disambiguation)
- Nicholas Caplyn, MP for Southampton (UK Parliament constituency)
