= Paulet St John-Mildmay =

English Whig Party politician

Paulet St John-Mildmay (8 April 1791 – 19 May 1845) was an English Whig Party politician. He sat in the House of Commons as a Member of Parliament (MP) for Winchester from 1818 to 1835, and from 1837 to 1841.

He was the third son of the fifteen children of Sir Henry St John-Mildmay, 3rd Baronet of Dogmersfield Park, Hampshire and his wife Jane, daughter and coheir of Carew Mildmay of Shawford House, Hampshire.

He was educated at Winchester School from 1803–05. In 1813, he married Anna Maria Wyndham, daughter of Hon. Bartholomew Bouverie. They had 4 sons and 3 daughters. In 1808, he succeeded to his father's property of Hazlegrove House, near Sparkford in Somerset.

He served as an ensign in the 2nd Foot Guards from 1807, and then as a lieutenant and captain from 1811–12. In 1813 he became a lieutenant in the Dogmersfield yeoman cavalry.

At the 1818 general election he was returned as MP for Winchester, on the interest controlled by his mother. The seat had previously been held by his father, and by his brother Sir Henry St John-Mildmay, 4th Baronet.

Parliament of the United Kingdom
Preceded by Richard Meyler; James Henry Leigh	Member of Parliament for Winchester; 1818–1835; With: James Henry Leigh to 1823; Sir Edward Hyde East, Bt 1823–1831; James Buller East 1831–1832; William Bingham Baring 1832–35	Succeeded by William Bingham Baring; James Buller East
Preceded by William Bingham Baring; James Buller East	Member of Parliament for Winchester; 1837–1841; With: James Buller East	Succeeded by Bickham Escott; James Buller East
