= John Caplyn =

John Caplyn may refer to:

- John Caplyn (died c. 1569), MP for Southampton and Bodmin
- John Caplyn (died c. 1603), MP for Gloucester
