= Giles Baring =

English cricketer (1910–1986)

Personal information
- Full name: Amyas Evelyn Giles Baring
- Born: 21 January 1910; Roehampton, London, England
- Died: 29 August 1986 (aged 76); Newcastle upon Tyne, Northumberland, England
- Batting: Right-handed
- Bowling: Right-arm fast

Domestic team information
- Years: Team
- 1930–1931: Cambridge University
- 1930–1939: Hampshire
- 1935–1946: Marylebone Cricket Club

Career statistics
Competition	First-class
Matches	70
Runs scored	664
Batting average	8.73
100s/50s	–/–
Top score	46
Balls bowled	10,671
Wickets	197
Bowling average	28.46
5 wickets in innings	10
10 wickets in match	2
Best bowling	9/26
Catches/stumpings	29/–
- Source: Cricinfo, 23 January 2010

Amyas Evelyn Giles Baring (21 January 1910 – 29 August 1986), known as Giles Baring, was an English first-class cricketer, who was mostly associated as a fast bowler with Hampshire before the Second World War.

== Early life and education ==
A member of the Baring family of Barings Bank, he was born in Roehampton on 21 January 1910. He was the third son of Lieutenant Colonel The Hon. Guy Victor Baring, a Member of Parliament for Winchester and a soldier in the Coldstream Guards. He had four brothers, Oliver Hugh (1904–1908), Simon Alexander Vivian (1905–1962), Aubrey George Adeane (1912–1987), and Esmond Charles (1914–1963), and one sister, Olivia Constance Leonora (1908–1975). Barham was educated in Winchester at West Downs School, before attending Gresham's School in Norfolk. From there, he matriculated to Magdalene College, Cambridge. During his first two years at Cambridge, he did little from a cricketing perspective, though later in his second year he had a trial for Cambridge University Cricket Club, making his debut in first-class cricket against Somerset at Fenner's. In 1931, he made a second first-class appearance for the university against the touring New Zealanders. He was kept out of the Cambridge eleven largely by the presence of Ken Farnes.

== Career with Hampshire ==
Although he had not appeared regularly at first-class level for Cambridge University, Baring began playing for Hampshire as a right-arm fast bowler, debuting in the County Championship against Gloucestershire at Southampton. He played for Hampshire on eighteen occasions during the 1930, taking 32 wickets for them at an average of 40.78; despite that, Baring had a number of catches dropped in the slips, while his pace and spirit suitably impressed the Hampshire hierarchy. The following season he made 22 first-class appearances for Hampshire, taking 74 wickets at an average of 22.16; against Essex at Colchester, he took figures of 9 for 26 in the Essex first innings. These would remain the best innings figures by a Hampshire bowler until bettered by Bob Cottam in 1965. With Baron Tennyson playing less regularly for Hampshire, Baring captained Hampshire on seven occasions during the 1931 season, being one of five captains used that season. Alongside playing for Hampshire, Baring also appeared for the Gentlemen in the end of season Gentlemen v Players match at Folkestone. Following the season, he was involved in a serious car accident in which he dislocated both knees, which resulted in him missing the 1932 season and essentially ended his cricket career.

Baring returned to play for Hampshire against the touring West Indians in May 1934, with him making four further first-class appearances that season. He took 18 wickets at an average of 29.38, which included two five wicket hauls, though it was noted by Wisden that he bowled at a much reduced pace as a result of his accident. He played three times for Hampshire in 1934, having returned to his pre-injury bowling pace, notably with success against the touring Australians. He took 5 for 112 in their first innings, which included the wicket of Don Bradman. He also appeared in the 1934 Gentlemen v Players fixture at The Oval. He was seldom available for Hampshire in the years which followed, with him playing three times in 1935, a year in which he made two appearances for the Marylebone Cricket Club (MCC) against Cambridge University and Oxford University. He appeared once in the 1936 County Championship against Gloucestershire, and two years later he appeared against the touring Australians. Baring returned to play for Hampshire in 1939, with him making eleven first-class appearances and taking 34 wickets at an average of 22.52, including match figures of 10 for 110 against Kent. In the 1939 season, he also played for the Free Foresters against Oxford University. Following the Second World War, he did not return to play for Hampshire, but did make a final first-class appearance in 1946 for the MCC against Cambridge University at Lord's.

Wisden described him as a fast bowler who bowled "with a high action" and "was genuinely fast and a great trier". He did not swing the ball much, but could make at times make it lift awkwardly. In seventy first-class matches, he took 197 wickets at an average of 28.46, taking a five wicket haul on ten occasions. For Hampshire, he played 62 first-class matches, taking 176 wickets at an average of 27.48. As a tailend batsman, he scored 664 runs at a batting average of 8.73, but never made a score over fifty.

== Personal life ==
He married firstly, on 25 May 1935, Mona Montgomerie Mullins, the daughter of Colonel Willoughby Brooking Mullins of Ambersham House in Midhurst; the couple had one daughter, Claire Leonora Baring, born 29 February 1936. She later married Peter Alistair Ward. By his daughter, Baring had three grandchildren, amongst whom were the actresses Rachel Ward and Tracy Worcester. He would divorce Mona in 1949, and remarried in May of the same year to Peggy Michell Gaskell, with the couple having two sons.

Following his first-class cricket career, Baring concentrated on his business interests, which included cement production and the import of goods from West Africa. He was the chairman of Latham, Brown and Company, who specialised in the production of paint and varnish. It was this enterprise which gained Baring considerable wealth. It was through this company that he played an important role in the cricketer Bill Edrich swapping from professional to amateur status in 1947, when he appointed Edrich to the role of sales director.

Throughout his life, Baring encountered several legal issues, which were often coupled with his heavy drinking. In 1944, he was fined for drink-driving after crashing into a bollard in Chelsea. He later lost his driving licence and was fined £50 in 1959, when he was found at West Meon to be drunk while in control of a motor vehicle, to such an extent as to be incapable of controlling it. In the same year, he was involved in a divorce case where he was ordered to pay £2000 to the husband of a woman with whom he was having an affair, which was said to have "crippled him" financially. Baring died in hospital in Newcastle on 29 August 1986. He was buried at St John the Evangelist Church in Winchester.
