= Francis Baring, 2nd Earl of Northbrook =

British politician

The Right Honourable The Earl of Northbrook
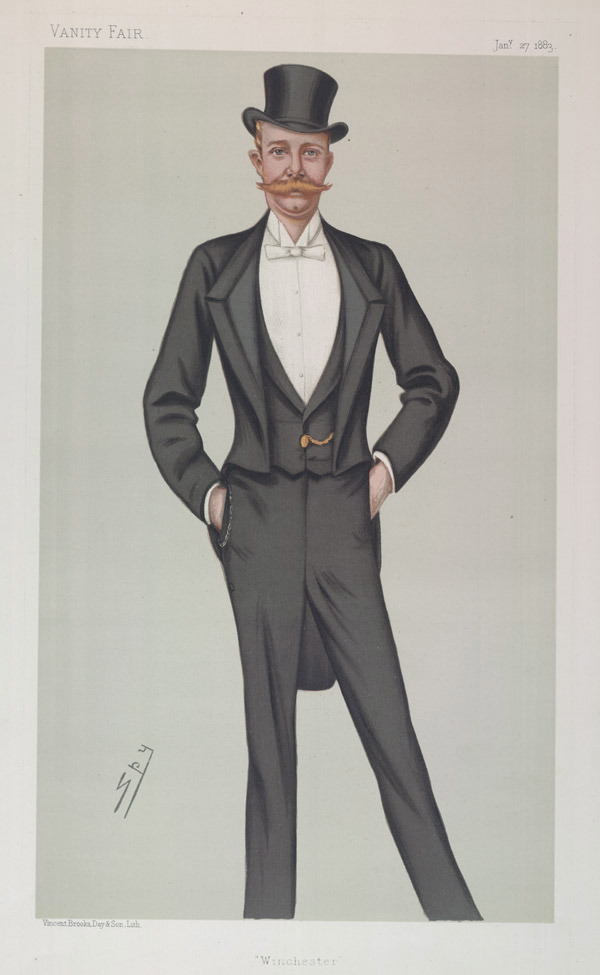
- Caricature of "Winchester" by "Spy" (Leslie Ward), published in Vanity Fair in 1883.

Member of Parliament for Biggleswade
- In office 1886–1892
- Preceded by: Charles Magniac
- Succeeded by: George W. E. Russell

Member of Parliament for Winchester
- In office 1880–1885 Serving with Richard Moss
- Preceded by: William Barrow Simonds; Arthur Robert Naghten
- Succeeded by: Arthur Loftus Tottenham

Personal details
- Born: Francis George Baring; 8 December 1850
- Died: 12 April 1929 (aged 78)
- Party: Liberal; Liberal Unionist
- Spouses: Ada Ethel Sophie Davidson (m. 1894; died 1894) Florence Anita Coote Abercromby (m. 1899)
- Parent(s): Thomas Baring, 1st Earl of Northbrook; Elizabeth Harriett Sturt
- Education: Eton College

Francis George Baring, 2nd Earl of Northbrook (8 December 1850 – 12 April 1929), styled Viscount Baring from 1876 to 1904, was a British politician.

== Early life ==
Northbrook was the eldest and only surviving son of Thomas Baring, 1st Earl of Northbrook, and his wife Elizabeth Harriett Sturt, daughter of Henry Charles Sturt and sister of Henry Sturt, 1st Baron Alington. His sister, Lady Jane Emma Baring, was the second wife of Col. Hon. Sir Henry George Lewis Crichton, third son of John Crichton, 3rd Earl Erne.

He was educated at Eton and later served in the Rifle Brigade and in the Grenadier Guards.

== Career ==
Between 1873 and 1876 he was aide-de-camp to his father, the Viceroy of India. In 1880, he entered the House of Commons for Winchester as a Liberal, a seat he held until 1885. He supported the Ilbert Bill arguing that racial disqualifications for judicial offices were "a grave political evil" that intensified racial antagonisms. He disagreed with William Ewart Gladstone over Irish Home Rule and later represented Biggleswade as a Liberal Unionist from 1886 to 1892.

In 1904, he succeeded his father in the earldom and entered the House of Lords.

== Personal life ==
On 26 June 1894, Lord Northbrook married firstly Ada Ethel Sophie, daughter of Col. Cuthbert Davidson CB, and former wife of Ian Robert James Murray Grant of Glenmoriston. She died suddenly only a month after their marriage.

He married secondly Florence Anita, daughter of Eyre Coote and widow of Sir Robert John Abercromby, 7th Baronet, in 1899. There were no children from either marriage.

Lord Northbrook died in April 1929, aged 78, when the viscountcy of Baring and earldom became extinct. He was succeeded in his junior title of Baron Northbrook and in the Baring Baronetcy by his half-first cousin, Francis Arthur Baring. The Countess of Northbrook, who was appointed a CBE, died in December 1946, aged 85.

Parliament of the United Kingdom
Preceded by William Barrow Simonds; Arthur Robert Naghten	Member of Parliament for Winchester; 1880–1885; With: Richard Moss	Succeeded by Arthur Loftus Tottenham
Preceded by Charles Magniac	Member of Parliament for Biggleswade; 1886–1892	Succeeded by George W. E. Russell
Peerage of the United Kingdom
Preceded by Thomas George Baring	Earl of Northbrook; 1904–1929	Extinct
Preceded by Thomas George Baring	Baron Northbrook; 1904–1929	Succeeded by Francis Arthur Baring
