= Howard Kemp Prossor =

English art connoisseur (1867–1959)

Percy George Howard Kemp Prossor (HK)
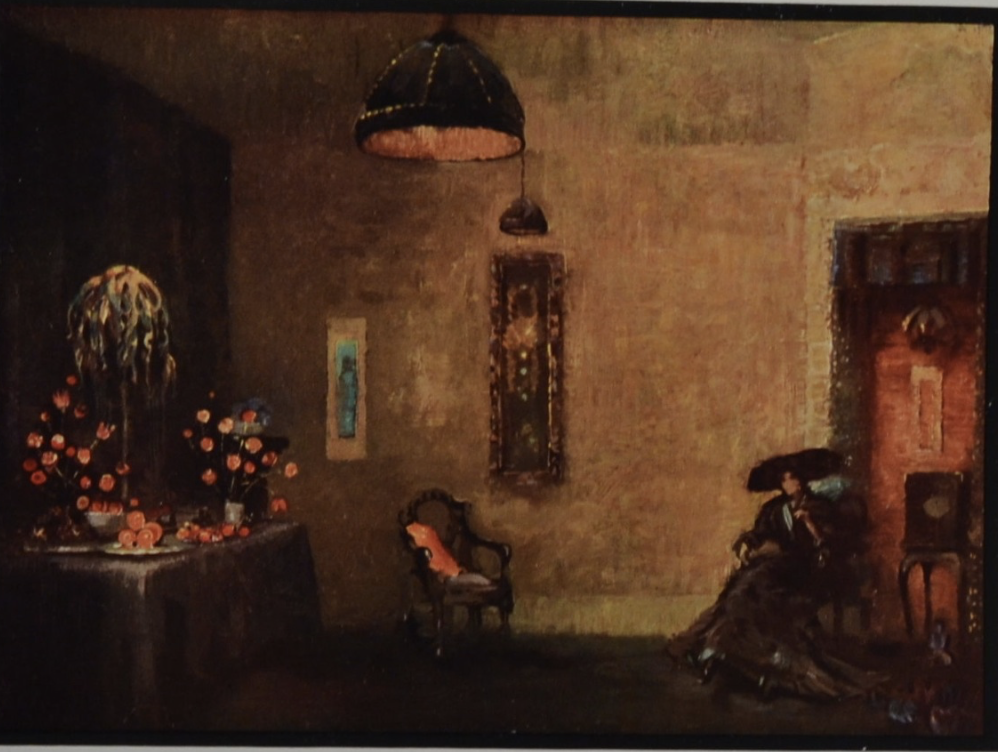
- "A Black Room" by HK Prossor
- Born: 1867; Hove, Sussex, England
- Died: 25 June 1959 (aged 91); London, England
- Resting place: London
- Known for: Interior design and using colour as a medicine

Percy George Howard Kemp Prossor (known as "HK" and sometimes as Kemp Prossor) (1867–25 June 1959) was an English art connoisseur who advocated the use of colour for treating mood and other psychological conditions, a theory that was most popular between 1917 and 1919.

During the First World War he gave up part of his house for an extension to the Ethel McCaul Hospital in Welbeck Street, London, which with his encouragement used colour therapy to treat victims of shell shock (PTSD).

== Early career ==
On a ship's passenger list in the mid 1890s, Prossor is recorded as Professor HK Prossor. From 1894 to 1901, Prossor was a cigar importer with premises in Old Bond Street, London, then at 60 Piccadilly.

In the early 1900s he befriended Evert Moll, the Dutch maritime artist, who stayed in London between 1902 and 1906. Prossor visited Moll in Dordrecht in 1907.

In 1911 he referred to himself in the UK census as an "art expert" living in Brighton. Later in the 1910s he was listed as an "interior designer" in Chester Square, Pimlico, and in the 1914 and 1915 trade directories he had picture galleries, most probably called the Ryder Gallery, in Stafford Street and Conduit Street, Mayfair.

In 1914 Prossor came up with new designs for stage curtains at the Garrick Theatre which were published in The Sketch magazine. Headlined Decor for Turns: New Art for the Halls, they included curtains to be used for ballet, revues and comedies.

== Experimenting with colour ==
By 1915 Prossor was attracting press attention for his "colour rooms" which made use of new electric lighting. A set of three rooms, a black room, an opal room and a blue and silver room "is drawing all London to the Ryder Gallery just now". Prossor told the Daily News and Leader: "All my rooms are set to music and all my ideas and inspirations come from music. When someone is playing I do not hear any notes but I see the most wonderful colours and combinations of colours." He said that colours came from "beyond the world of sense and from dreams and what may be achieved through colour in the future is impossible to imagine at present. We are only beginning to realise its significance".

His theories were being taken seriously by some people. In the Daily News and Leader interview he said he was "prescribing for a little girl who is suffering from melancholia and cannot bear the sunlight". He said he devised a room by tapping into the child's vibrations or "aura". He expressed an ambition to "treat" prisoners by applying colour to prison cells.

By the second year of the First World War, with so many families losing their young men, interest was growing in spiritualism and theosophy, notably involving Rudyard Kipling and Bibby's Magazine.

== The colour cure ==
In 1916, Prossor put to the test his theories of how colour could affect the psyche with a Peace Room in a house in Chelsea which was the subject of a report in The Times. Its account shows how Prossor attached a colour to each emotion. "The floor is violet, denoting love of truth, the canopy of sapphire (spiritual perception), the walls lemon yellow (love of light and peace)." The paper said the Peace Room scheme was complemented by recitals of "symbolic music" by Irene Penso and Georges de Warfaaz and was "evidently inspired by aestheticism and esoteric beliefs". It was noted that the Peace Room should be used by wounded soldiers for tea and rest.

Prossor went on to paint the wards at the McCaul Hospital. In 1962, The British Medical Journal said this gave his ideas a degree of legitimacy although instead of invoking the metaphysical attributes of colour this experiment stressed the sensory effects of colour and its optical relationship to natural phenomena, such as "a day in spring".

In 1916, Prossor's theories were attracting international attention and Algemeen Handlsblad noted him as "the greatest and most famous decorator in London".

By 1917, Prossor had created the decor for three hospitals in London. As well as the McCaul Hospital, colour wards were created at the Maudsley Neurological Clearing Hospital, Denmark Hill, and St John's Hospital for Diseases of the Skin. The following year the Herald of Wales said that six general hospitals were using Kemp Prossor colour wards Accounts of Prossor's approach were given in the British Journal of Nursing in October 1917 and September 1918.

The journal described how Prossor, "having studied 'colour-medicine' and the influence of colour on children and adults, is so convinced a believer in its benefits that he has closed down half his house, given up his motor car, and is devoting himself to arranging and supervising colour wards in military hospitals". It goes on: "Imagine the change of being transported from the tortured battle-grounds of Europe, desolate, and reeking with the carnage of war, to these wards where 'all the air is thrilling with the Spring,' for that is the message of Mr Prossor's colour wards."

Flight magazine in 1918 praised the benefits of Prossor's colour schemes for airmen with "nervous affections" after active service. The journal had some reservations about the treatment but was open-minded as to its possible therapeutic qualities. "Every other consideration apart, we simply cannot afford to ignore any method of treatment"

== Colours used ==
A report in the Herald of Wales in 1918 is typical in the information it gives about the colours used by Prossor. Its account reads: "The first ward is treated in 'Sunlight Yellow', 'Sunlight Primrose', and 'Spring Green'. The second is in the same colours with mauve curtains. In the third there is a large proportion of another special Prossor colour — 'Anemone-mauve', and the fourth has Kemp Prossor 'Apple-blossom pink' walls and 'Sunlight primrose' dado. 'Firmament blue' is used for all the ceilings, the colour being used in proportion to lighting. One room is intended to act entirely as a sedative for excitable patients; all-the furnishings are mauve, and the fireplace silver. Yellow is used as a stimulant, mauve as a sedative, and blue for harmony and a sense of freedom."

From 1918 Berger's Matone Paints began using Prossor's name in its advertisements and the company had a licensing agreement "making it the only material authorised and made to Mr Kemp Prossor's specification and apprpoval in these special registered colours".

== International effect ==
In 1918 the Union of South Africa public works department proposed to adopt Prossor's colour schemes in all its mental wards. In 1919, the Red Cross opened a hospital at Russell Lea, Sydney, Australia, with Roy de Maistre, a young artist, borrowing Prossor's idea for the colour cure.

== Later life ==
After the end of the First World War interest in the colour cure waned. Prossor was still feted, however, and he and his wife Ada Moss, the daughter of MP Richard Moss, regularly appeared in The Times Court Circular.
