= William Myers (British politician) =

British politician

Myers in 1895.

William Henry Myers (30 November 1854 – 21 December 1933) was an English Conservative politician who sat in the House of Commons from 1892 to 1906.

Myers was elected Member of Parliament for Winchester in 1892. He held the seat until 1906.

Myers died at the age of 79.

Parliament of the United Kingdom
| Preceded by Richard Moss | Member of Parliament for Winchester; 1892–1906 | Succeeded by Guy Baring |
