= Evert Moll =

Dutch painter

Evert Moll (December 15, 1878 - May 10 1955) was a Dutch painter.

He is known for his depiction of the Rotterdam port. In the early 1900s he befriended Howard Kemp.

He lived in South Holland and regularly visited Willem Roelofs's home.

His style was known for smoke and a vibrant color pallet in his works.
