= Thomas Willis Fleming =

English landed proprietor and Conservative Member of Parliament

Thomas James Willis Fleming (19 June 1819 – 7 March 1890) was an English landed proprietor and Conservative Member of Parliament.

He was the second son of John Willis Fleming of North Stoneham Park. He was educated at Eton and Trinity College, Oxford. He was called to the bar of the Middle Temple on 27 January 1843.

His political career was brief. He twice unsuccessfully contested the Isle of Wight seat, in 1847 and 1857. He first contested Winchester in the general election of 1859, when he stood unsuccessfully in alliance with the sitting Conservative MP Sir James Buller East against the two Liberal candidates. Then in February 1864, Sir James Buller East retired and Thomas was returned unopposed. He was defeated at the general election in July 1865.

In 1845 he married Caroline Hunter, by whom he had three sons and four daughters. He died in 1890 at Bern, Switzerland, and was buried at the Bremgartenfriedhof.

== Sources ==
- The Willis Fleming Historical Trust: papers and biographical file

== Notes ==
Parliament of the United Kingdom
| Preceded by Sir James Buller East, Bt; John Bonham-Carter | Member of Parliament for Winchester; 1864–1865; With: John Bonham-Carter 1847–1874 | Succeeded by William Barrow Simonds; John Bonham-Carter |
