= Guy Baring =

British politician and soldier (1873–1916)

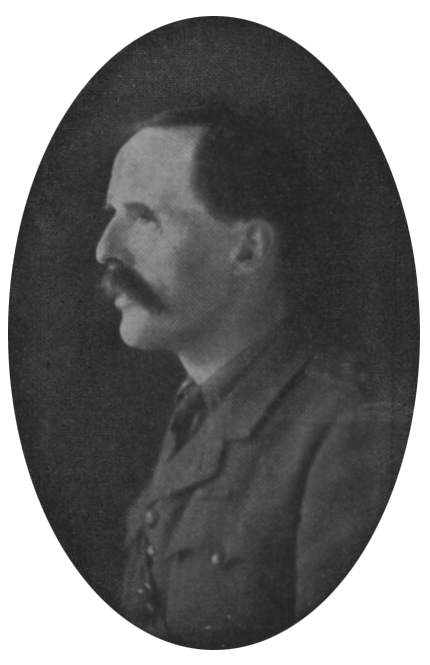
- Guy Baring from the Roll of Honour published in The Illustrated London News on 30 September 1916.

Member of Parliament for Winchester
- In office 8 February 1906 – 15 September 1916
- Preceded by: William Myers
- Succeeded by: Douglas Carnegie

Personal details
- Born: Guy Victor Baring; 26 February 1873
- Died: 15 September 1916 (aged 43)
- Spouse: Olive Alethea Smith (m. 1903)
- Children: 6, including Giles Baring
- Parents: Alexander Baring, 4th Baron Ashburton (father); Leonora Caroline Digby (mother)

Guy Victor Baring (26 February 1873 – 15 September 1916) was a British Army officer and politician. He became a Conservative member of the British House of Commons but was one of 22 Members killed in action in the First World War.

== Background ==
Baring was a member of the Baring family of Barings Bank, a younger son of Alexander Baring, 4th Baron Ashburton (1835–1889), and his wife Leonora Caroline Digby. He was educated at Eton and the Royal Military College, Sandhurst, and was commissioned into the Coldstream Guards in 1893.

In 1899 Baring's unit was sent to fight in the South African War, and he was present at the battles of Belmont, Graspan, Modder River, Magersfontein, and Driefontein, as well as the occupation of Bloemfontein. During the fighting in South Africa he was mentioned in despatches, and received the Queen's South Africa Medal with three clasps.

Baring was the commander of a detachment of the Coldstream Guards in 1900 which went with the Australia and New Zealand Imperial Representative Corps to the inauguration of The Earl of Hopetoun as Governor-General of Australia. He was promoted to captain in March 1901, attached to the King's African Rifles and was a special service officer with the Jubaland Expedition in 1901 against the Ogaden Somalis and was awarded a medal with clasp.

In February 1902 he was gazetted as a Captain in the Coldstream Guards vice John Ponsonby, who had been seconded to serve in South Africa.

== Career ==
He was elected as the Member of Parliament for Winchester in the 1906 general election, and was re-elected in the January and December 1910 elections with increased majorities.

Although he had formally left the Coldstream Guards in 1913, he rejoined immediately on the outbreak of war in 1914. He was posted to Windsor where he commanded a training company, until July 1915 when he was posted to France. He served as second-in-command of the 4th (Pioneer) Battalion; and after the Battle of Loos he commanded the first Battalion of the Coldstream Guards.

== Death ==
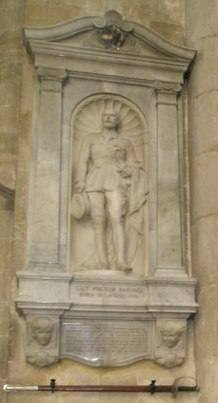
Memorial to Guy Victor Baring at Winchester Cathedral

During the Battle of the Somme on the morning of 15 September 1916, Baring's Battalion was advancing along the Ginchy-Lesboeufs road to attack German positions, together with two others. It was the first time in history that three Coldstream Guard battalions attacked together, but despite advancing "as steadily as though they were walking down the Mall" the action took a heavy toll. 17 officers and 690 other ranks went into battle, but only three officers survived (one injured) and 221 other ranks. Baring was buried in Citadel New Military Cemetery near Fricourt. Baring is commemorated on Panel 8 of the Parliamentary War Memorial in Westminster Hall, one of 22 MPs who died during World War I to be named on that memorial. He is also one of 19 MPs who fell in the war who are commemorated by heraldic shields in the Commons Chamber. A further act of commemoration came with the unveiling in 1932 of a manuscript-style illuminated book of remembrance for the House of Commons, which includes a short biographical account of the life and death of Baring.

== Family ==
Baring married on 16 July 1903 Olive Alethea Smith, daughter of Hugh Colin Smith and Constance Maria Josepha Adeane, and they had six children, including the cricketer Giles Baring. Their great grandchildren include the actress Rachel Ward and the actress and environmentalist Tracy Worcester.

Parliament of the United Kingdom
| Preceded by William Myers | Member of Parliament for Winchester; 1906–1916 | Succeeded by Douglas Carnegie |
