= Tracy Somerset, Duchess of Beaufort =

British environmental activist and actress

Tracy, Duchess of Beaufort
- Born: Tracy Louise Ward; 22 December 1958 (age 67); Kensington, London, England
- Other names: Tracy Worcester; Tracy Beaufort
- Education: Academy of Live and Recorded Arts; London Drama School
- Occupations: Environmental activist, former actress
- Spouse: The 12th Duke of Beaufort (m. 1987; div. 2018)
- Children: 3
- Parent: Hon. Peter Ward
- Relatives: Rachel Ward (sister)

Tracy Louise Somerset, Duchess of Beaufort (née Ward; born 22 December 1958) is a British duchess, environmental activist, and former actress. She is usually known as Tracy Worcester, the married style that she often used before 2017, and as an actress was credited as Tracy-Louise Ward. She was previously married to the 12th Duke of Beaufort.

== Life and career ==
Born in Kensington, Tracy Louise Ward is a daughter of the Hon. Peter Alistair Ward, a younger son of the 3rd Earl of Dudley. Her father became chairman of the family business, Baggeridge Brick. His first wife, Clare Leonora Baring, was the only child of the gentleman cricketer Giles Baring. Tracy is the sister of the actress Rachel Ward. She also has one brother and two half-brothers from her father's second marriage. Her great-grandfather, the 2nd Earl of Dudley, was Lord Lieutenant of Ireland in the early 20th century, and then Governor-General of Australia. He was the son of the 1st Earl of Dudley and Georgina, Countess of Dudley, and owned nearly 30,000 acres in Staffordshire and Worcestershire, two hundred coal and iron mines, and several iron works, including the Round Oak Steelworks.

She grew up on her father's estate at Cornwell, Oxfordshire. After school, she worked as a model in Paris and then at Christie's in London, before working in various art galleries in New York. In her early twenties, she trained as an actress, first at the Academy of Live and Recorded Arts, London, and then at the London Drama School.

From her acting career, she is best remembered for her role as Tessa Robinson in the television detective series C.A.T.S. Eyes (1986–1987). She also appeared in the film Dance with a Stranger and the Doctor Who serial Timelash, both in 1985, and played the first Miss Scarlett in the television drama game show Cluedo (1990). Her theatre credits include: Our Day Out (Nottingham Playhouse) and Intimacy (Café Theatre).

== Personal life ==
On 13 June 1987, she married Henry, Marquess of Worcester, known to his friends as Bunter, a landowner and chartered surveyor who was the eldest son and heir of the 11th Duke of Beaufort. The wedding was attended by both Charles III, then Prince of Wales, and Diana, Princess of Wales. The Worcesters divorced in 2018, shortly after Henry had succeeded his father as the 12th Duke of Beaufort.

== Campaigner ==
In 1989, Tracy Worcester began volunteering with Friends of the Earth. Since then, she has been active in green politics as a trustee of The Gaia Foundation, former Associate Director of the International Society for Ecology and Culture, trustee of The Schumacher Society and the Bath Environment Centre, on the Council of the UK's Soil Association, and former member of the International Forum on Globalisation. She was a member of the Referendum Party, which opposed Britain's involvement in the European Union.

Since 1989, Worcester has been networking, fund raising, writing, making documentaries and public speaking to promote a more local food economy. Her feature-length films include Is Small Still Beautiful in India, and The Politics of Happiness in Bhutan. She produced a documentary film Pig Business, broadcast on Channel 4 in 2009, highlighting the environmental and health impacts of intensive factory pig farming.

She founded and directs Farms Not Factories, a campaigning organisation that encourages people to only buy high-welfare meat from local, independent farmers. She lobbies the government and urges citizens to re-localise the food economy by buying locally produced food wherever possible. She has directed publicity stunts with celebrities such as Jerome Flynn and Dominic West in order to bring attention to intensive factory farms being built in the UK. She has worked with celebrity chefs including Hugh Fearnley-Whittingstall and Mark Hix to encourage people to only buy high welfare pork. She has purchased shares in Tesco, Sainsbury's, Domino's and Greggs, and attended shareholder meetings in order to campaign against high street food chains sourcing pork from factory farms. She has previously gone undercover to expose the conditions inside UK factory pig farms.

During the campaign for the 2015 general election, she was one of several public figures who endorsed the parliamentary candidacy of the Green Party's Caroline Lucas. She canvassed for Jeremy Corbyn in the 2019 general election, and now supports George Galloway's Workers Party of Britain. She was one of the nine people who put up bail sureties for Wikileaks founder Julian Assange in 2012.

In 2020, she established a chemical-free organic market garden venture named Forbidden Fruit and Veg, which operates inside the walled garden at her estate in Badminton. The head grower, along with the trainees, are all WWOOF participants who reside in her home.

She publishes a monthly newsletter.

== Ancestry ==
Ancestors of Tracy Somerset, Duchess of Beaufort

16. William Ward, 1st Earl of Dudley
8. William Ward, 2nd Earl of Dudley
17. Georgina Moncreiffe
4. William Ward, 3rd Earl of Dudley
18. Charles Henry Gurney
9. Rachel Gurney
19. Alice Marie Princep
2. Hon. Peter Ward
20. George Sutherland-Leveson-Gower, 3rd Duke of Sutherland
10. Cromartie Sutherland-Leveson-Gower, 4th Duke of Sutherland
21. Anne Hay-Mackenzie, 1st Countess of Cromartie
5. Lady Rosemary Sutherland-Leveson-Gower
22. Robert St Clair-Erskine, 4th Earl of Rosslyn
11. Lady Millicent St Clair-Erskine
23. Blanche FitzRoy
1. Tracy Louise Ward
24. Alexander Baring, 4th Baron Ashburton
12. Hon. Guy Baring
25. Hon. Leonora Digby
6. Giles Baring
26. Hugh Smith
13. Olive Smith
27. Constance Adeane
3. Claire Baring
28. John Mullins
14. Col. Willoughby Brooking Mullins
29. Emily Brooking
7. Mona Mullins
30. Frederick Montgomerie
15. Mabel Montgomerie
31. Mary Henry
