= 1916 Winchester by-election =

UK Parliamentary by-election

The 1916 Winchester by-election was held on 19 October 1916. The by-election was held due to the incumbent Conservative MP, Guy Baring, being killed in action in the Battle of the Somme. It was won by the Conservative candidate Douglas Carnegie.

1916 Winchester by-election
Party	Candidate	Votes	%	±%
Conservative	Douglas Carnegie	1,218	72.0	+11.5
Independent	Henry Charles Woods	473	28.0	New
Majority		745	44.0	+23.0
Turnout		1,691	52.0	−36.7
Conservative hold		Swing		
