= Forbes baronets of Newe (1823) =

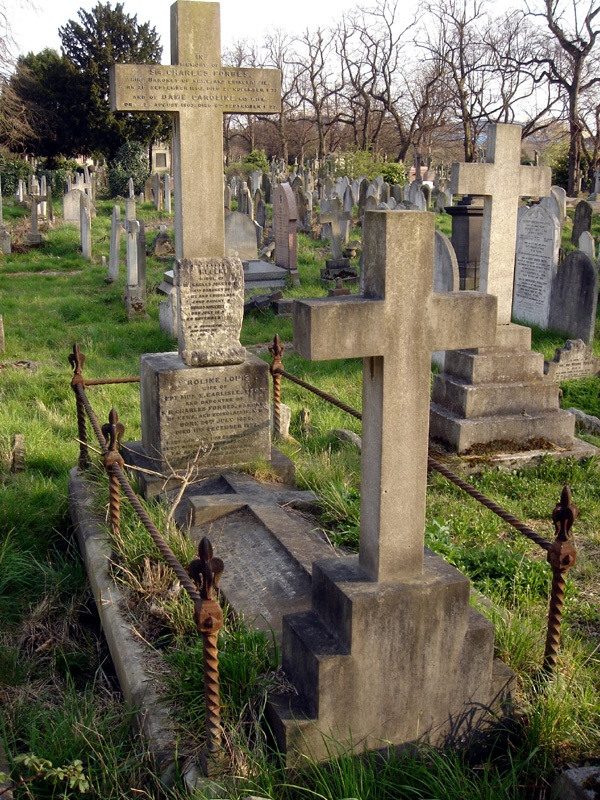
Sir Charles Forbes, 3rd Baronet (1803–1877) funerary monument, Brompton Cemetery, London

The Forbes baronetcy, of Newe in the County of Aberdeen, was created in the Baronetage of the United Kingdom on 4 November 1823 for Charles Forbes, a merchant in Bombay, India. He was a Member of Parliament for Beverley and then Malmesbury.

In 1833 Forbes became the heir male of Alexander Forbes, 3rd Lord Forbes of Pitsligo (a title which had been attainted in 1745), and was allowed by the Lord Lyon to use the Pitsligo arms and supporters. Forbes was a descendant of William Forbes, younger brother of Sir Alexander Forbes of Pitsligo (from whom the Lords Forbes of Pitsligo descended) and great-grandson of Sir William Forbes, brother of Alexander Forbes, 1st Lord Forbes.

== Forbes baronets, of Newe (1823) ==
- Sir Charles Forbes, 1st Baronet (1774–1849)
- Sir Charles Forbes, 2nd Baronet (1832–1852)
- Sir Charles Forbes, 3rd Baronet (1803–1877)
- Sir Charles John Forbes, 4th Baronet (1843–1884)
- Sir Charles Stewart Forbes, 5th Baronet (1867–1927)
- Sir John Stewart Forbes, 6th Baronet (1901–1984)
- Sir Hamish Stewart Forbes, 7th Baronet (1916–2007)
- Sir James Thomas Stewart Forbes, 8th Baronet (born 1957)

As of 2026 there is no heir to the baronetcy.

== Coat of arms ==
Coat of arms of Forbes baronets of Newe
| Crest A falcon rising proper. Escutcheon Quarterly: 1st and 4th azure, three bears' heads couped argent, muzzled gules (Forbes), 2nd and 3rd, azure, three cinquefoils argent (Fraser). Supporters Two bears argent, muzzled gules. Motto Altius ibunt qui ad summa nituntur (They will attain a higher point, who strive at things the most exalted) |

== Notes ==
Baronetage of the United Kingdom
| Preceded by East baronets | Forbes baronets of Newe; 4 November 1823 | Succeeded by Reid baronets |
