= James Buller East =

British barrister

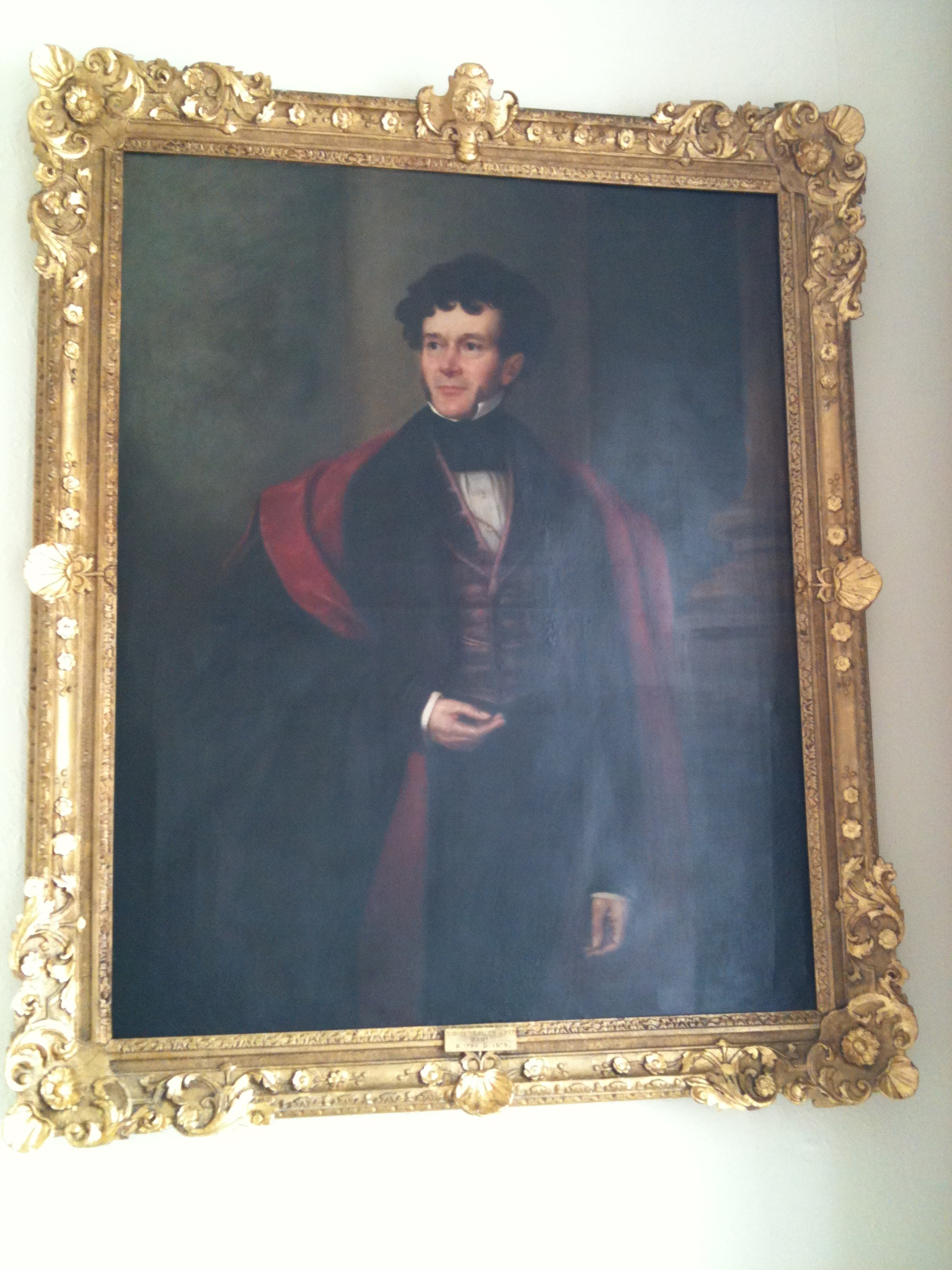
JBE at home

Sir James Buller East, 2nd Baronet (1 February 1789 – 19 November 1878) was a British barrister.

East, eldest son of Sir Edward Hyde East, was born in Bloomsbury, London, on 1 February 1789. He was educated at Harrow and at Christ Church, Oxford, where he proceeded B.A. in 1810, M.A. in 1824, and was created a Doctor of Civil Law on 13 June 1834. He was called to the bar of the Inner Temple on 5 February 1813, became a bencher of his inn on 15 January 1856, and reader in 1869. He succeeded his father as second baronet on 8 January 1847.

As a conservative, he sat for Winchester from 30 July 1831 to 3 December 1832, when he was defeated, and from 10 January 1835 to 10 February 1864. He was a justice of the peace and deputy-lieutenant for Gloucestershire, and a magistrate for Oxfordshire.

He died at Bourton House, near Moreton-in-Marsh, Gloucestershire, on 19 November 1878 and left £70,000 in his will. He married, 27 June 1822, Caroline Eliza, second daughter of James Henry Leigh, and sister of Chandos Leigh, 1st Baron Leigh. She was born on 12 June 1794, and died on 7 April 1870.

Parliament of the United Kingdom
Preceded by Paulet St John-Mildmay; Sir Edward Hyde East, Bt	Member of Parliament for Winchester; 1831–1832; With: Paulet St John-Mildmay	Succeeded by Paulet St John-Mildmay; William Bingham Baring
Preceded by Paulet St John-Mildmay; William Bingham Baring	Member of Parliament for Winchester; 1835–1864; With: William Bingham Baring to 1837; Paulet St John-Mildmay 1837–41; Bickham Escott 1841–47; John Bonham-Carter from 1847	Succeeded by John Bonham-Carter; Thomas Willis Fleming
Baronetage of the United Kingdom
Preceded by Edward Hyde East	Baronet (of Calcutta); 1847–1878	Extinct
