= Pig Business =

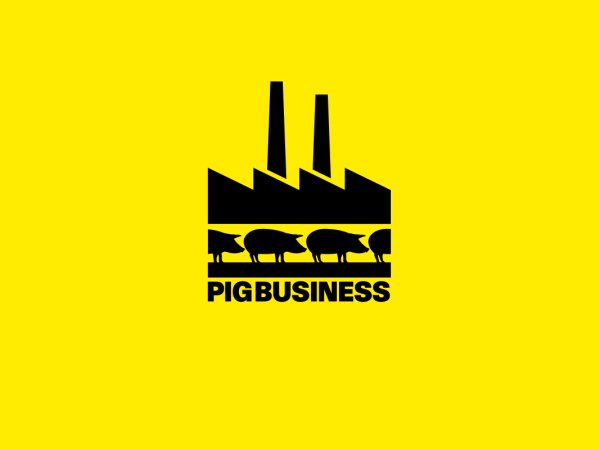
- Directed by: Tracy Worcester
- Written by: Tracy Worcester
- Produced by: Tracy Worcester, Alastair Kenneil
- Starring: Bobby Kennedy Jr, Tracy Worcester
- Release date: 20 May 2009 (Barbican)
- Running time: 73 minutes
- Country: United Kingdom
- Language: English
- Budget: £140,000

Pig Business is a 2009 investigative documentary and exposé by environmental activist and former actress Tracy Worcester. The film presents the findings of Worcester's four-year investigation into the hidden costs associated with pig factory farming. It advocates on behalf of small-scale farmers and discusses the topics of animal welfare, environmental pollution, corporate responsibility and food sovereignty.

== Plot summary ==
The film begins with an introduction by Tracy Worcester in which she reflects upon the role that the countryside and small-scale farms have had on her personal and family life. She proceeds to argue that this cultural heritage is under-threat from large-scale corporations that, driven by profit maximization, have replaced traditional farming with a system that treats animals as a mere raw material or input in an industrial system.

Worcester narrates the history and development of these large-scale corporations through the anti-competitive practices of vertical and horizontal integration. Through interviews with affected parties, as well as footage of campaign rallies and undercover exposés within factory farms, the film suggests that powerful corporations may take advantage of a monopoly position by acting in an unethical manner. It states that because the external costs of intensive animal farming are not taken into consideration by consumers, the industry constitutes an example of market failure.

Of particular focus is the expansion of food giant Smithfield Foods within Poland, a location selected for its low costs and strategic access to the European Union market, following Smithfield's acquisition of the former state-owned meat producer Animex Foods in 1999. Drawing on testimony from Polish academics, politicians, industry leaders, farmers and villagers, the film argues that poor corporate regulation has resulted in a number of human and environmental disasters within Poland. Specifically, Animex is accused of causing harm to human health through the over-application of pig slurry as an agricultural fertilizer, as well as of antibiotic misuse within factory farms. Worcester further suggests that Smithfield has influenced government legislation through the sponsoring of sympathetic politicians with financial grants.

Speaking in 2006, then CEO of Animex Foods Morten Jensen states that Animex is compliant with all Polish and European environmental legislation. In an interview given in 2008, Smithfield's vice-president of environmental and corporate affairs Dennis H Treacy states that contamination caused by slurry is illegal and that the organisation goes to "extra-ordinary lengths to ensure that they have a system in place that doesn't allow that". Responding to the issue of corporate donations, Treacy argues that such contributions are "the way of life in American government – part of the American system". Guardian columnist Warwick Smith argues that such donations corrupt democracy.

In closing, the documentary proposes a number of solutions to the issues it highlights. It advocates buying British meat to ensure that products are not imported from jurisdictions with less stringent animal rights legislation, particularly in relation to the use of sow stalls and tail docking. It further promotes the adoption of clearer labeling systems on food, and recommends buying meat certified high-welfare, outdoor-bred, free range or organic.

== Controversy ==
The film which took five years to make was initially refused for broadcasting by then BBC World due to fears of a legal backlash from Smithfield Foods. It was accepted for broadcast by Channel 4, but in February 2009 Channel 4 postponed broadcasting the film due to legal pressure. Parts of the documentary were then subsequently cut to ensure that it was 'libel proof'. Smithfield's lawyers wrote a letter stating that the film was defamatory and included untrue claims. The company denies claims that pigs are mistreated. Smithfield further claims to be taking steps to reduce its environmental footprint.

The film in altered form made its UK debut at the Barbican on 20 May 2009, with Hugh Fearnley-Whittingstall on hand to lend support. Due to legal pressure from Smithfield, this showing only went ahead when the filmmaker, Tracy Worcester, signed an indemnity taking personal responsibility for its content. The film was also shown at the 2009 Hay Festival where Bobby Kennedy Jr was present and criticised Smithfield's attempts to stop the film being shown on UK television and public screenings. Pig Business was finally broadcast on Channel 4's More4 on the 30th of June 2009. Representatives for Smithfield state that they have never threatened to sue Worcester and merely requested that inaccuracies be removed.

Controversy also surrounds the half-owned Smithfield Foods pig sheds near the village of La Gloria, Mexico, where as many as 1,800 villagers living near the plant had already complained of respiratory problems and 400 had been treated before the 2009 swine flu pandemic. Residents of La Gloria believe the out-break of Swine flu to be the result of contamination from the nearby farm. The origin of Swine flu continues to be debated.

== See also ==
- Intensive pig farming
- Compassion in World Farming
- Soil Association
- Swine influenza
