= Richard Birde (MP for Winchester) =

16th-century English politician

Richard Birde (died after 1595), of Winchester, Hampshire, was an English politician.

He was a member (MP) of the parliament of England for Winchester in 1571. He was Mayor of Winchester 1571–72, 1577–78 and 1584–85.

Parliament of England
Preceded by William Lawrence; Thomas Michelborne	Member of Parliament for Winchester; With: Thomas Michelborne	Succeeded by Thomas Michelborne replaced by William Bethell; John Caplyn
