= John Browne (Conservative politician) =

British politician (born 1938)

- John Browne in 2018 by Gage Skidmore

Member of Parliament for Winchester
- In office 3 May 1979 – 16 March 1992
- Preceded by: Morgan Morgan-Giles
- Succeeded by: Gerry Malone

Personal details
- Born: 17 October 1938 (age 87) Hampshire, England
- Party: UKIP
- Other political affiliations: Conservative (until 1992)
- Education: Royal Military Academy, Sandhurst; Cranfield Institute of Technology; Harvard Business School

John Ernest Douglas de la Valette Browne (born 17 October 1938) is a British former politician, soldier, investment banker, TV presenter and writer now based in West Palm Beach, Florida, United States of America.

== Early life ==
Browne was born in Hampshire, raised on a family farm near Bath, and educated at Malvern College, Royal Military Academy Sandhurst, Cranfield Institute of Technology and Harvard Business School. He served as an officer in the Grenadier Guards from 1959 to 1967 and as the first Guards' territorial, in the Grenadier Guards (V), retiring as a Major. He served abroad in Germany, Cyprus, and British Guiana (now Guyana) as Signals Officer and as the Battalion Pilot in British Guiana. Upon graduation from Harvard, he joined Morgan Stanley & Co. on Wall Street. On returning to England, he became Director of Middle East Operations of European Banking Company, a director of Worms Investments (a French investment bank), Tijari Finance (a Kuwaiti bank), The Churchill (private) Clinic and Scansat TV (now TV 3). He was a Court Member of Southampton University, an Advisor to Control Risks (a security company and Lloyd's kidnap and ransom adjuster), The Household Division Funds and to Barclays Bank. He served as a Councillor for Knightsbridge ward on Westminster City Council from 1974 to 1978.

== Member of Parliament ==
Browne was Conservative Party Member of Parliament for Winchester from the 1979 general election until 1992. In Parliament, he introduced The Privacy Bill (which, with Lords' Amendments, was talked out under Government Whips' direction at its third and final reading), The Armed Forces Liability for Injury Bill and one Act of Parliament to further the protection of animals. He was elected Chairman of the Conservative Backbench Small Business Committee (1984–87) and Secretary of the Conservative Backbench Finance (1981–83) and Defence (1982–83) Committees; appointed a Member of the Treasury Select Committee (1982–87) and a Delegate to the North Atlantic Assembly—the political arm of NATO—(1986–92) where he was Rapporteur on Human Rights (1989–92).

At the 1992 general election, he stood as an Independent Conservative candidate in Winchester after he refused to submit his name for what he termed "a disgraceful socialist style fixed double jeopardy" re-selection by the Conservative Party Central Office. He had been suspended briefly from the House of Commons for not declaring two of the clients of his financial consultancy company, which had been declared always. He had been instructed previously not to declare the clients of his company by the Registrar of Members' Interests. The Registrar told him that it was "unnecessary as farmers and lawyers do not have to declare any clients whatsoever. In particular, if you were the director of a large company, like ICI, with many thousands of clients, their voluminous declarations would make a mockery of the registry". In the election Browne came last out of four candidates, losing his seat to official Conservative Party candidate Gerry Malone.

== Post-Parliamentary career ==
Browne stood unsuccessfully as an independent under the label "Conservative Rebel" at the Newbury by-election in 1993. The following year, he stood as a "Conservative against European Union" candidate for Wight and Hampshire South at the European Parliament election. He stood in his old Westminster constituency of Winchester again as an independent in the 1997 general election, finishing seventh. He later joined the UK Independence Party, becoming a vice-president. He stood unsuccessfully for UKIP as a parliamentary candidate in Falmouth and Camborne in 2001 and in North Devon in 2005, where he was one of only very few UKIP candidates to save their deposits.

He divorced his first wife, French-born Elizabeth Garthwaite in 1985. He is currently divorced from his second wife, American-born Elaine Boylen.

He worked for Euro Pacific Capital, NY (founded by Peter Schiff) as its Senior Market Strategist.

Currently, he is a writer for Newsmax Media and is interviewed regularly on economic, financial, defence and political TV programs in America. Browne is also a real estate agent with Illustrated Properties in Palm Beach, Florida.

He is a Liveryman of the Goldsmiths Company, an Officer of the Order of Saint John (where he served on Chapter General from 1987 to 1990), a Governor of Malvern College and formerly of Southampton University.

He is the author of two books, Grenadier Grins (short, fun reminiscences of a life associated with the Grenadier Guards, 1956 to 2006) in 2006 and Hidden Account of the Romanovs (2013).

== In popular culture ==
Browne was portrayed by Charles McCurdy in the 2002 BBC production of Ian Curteis' controversial The Falklands Play.

Parliament of the United Kingdom
Preceded by Morgan Morgan-Giles	Member of Parliament for Winchester; 1979–1992	Succeeded by Gerry Malone
