= Peter Smithers =

British politician and horticulturalist

Sir Peter Henry Berry Otway Smithers VRD (9 December 1913 – 8 June 2006) was a United Kingdom Conservative Party politician. He was Member of Parliament for Winchester for 14 years, and a junior Minister in the early 1960s. He also served as Secretary General of the Council of Europe from 1964 to 1969.

== Life ==
He was born in Yorkshire and educated at Hawtreys, Harrow School and Magdalen College, Oxford. He received a First Class Honours Degree in modern history. He was called to the bar from the Inner Temple in 1936.

Smithers became an officer in the Royal Naval Volunteer Reserve in 1937 and by 1958 he retired as a lieutenant commander. During the Second World War he was associated with intelligence work in Paris, being a friend and colleague of Ian Fleming, who arranged for Smithers' diplomatic career. Fleming and Smithers were in Paris in 1940 when the French signed an armistice, surrendering to the Germans. The two men arranged for merchant ships to take British refugees to the UK. Smithers was later posted to Mexico and Washington as well as searching for spies in the UK. Smithers' Financial Times obituary suggests he was the model for Fleming's most famous character, Commander James Bond. Other possibilities are discussed in Inspirations for James Bond.

He received a number of diplomatic postings, being Assistant Naval Attaché at Washington, D.C., and Acting Naval Attaché at Mexico City (also covering part of Central America).

Smithers served as a councillor on Winchester Rural District Council (later amalgamated into Winchester City Council) 1946–50. He was elected as MP for Winchester at the 1950 general election and sat until he resigned in January 1964 on his appointment to the Council of Europe as Secretary-General. He had previously been a British delegate to the council. He was Parliamentary Private Secretary to a number of Ministers before becoming Parliamentary Under Secretary of State at the Foreign Office 1962–1964.

Smithers was knighted in the 1970 New Year Honours.

Smithers was enthusiastic about plants from childhood. By the end of his life, he recorded that he had tried to grow over 32,000 species. He created gardens in houses where he lived in Winchester (England), Cuernavaca (Mexico), Strasbourg (France) and Vico Morcote (Switzerland). He introduced several plant varieties to horticulture such as Lilium 'Vico Queen', Magnolia x wieseneri 'William Watson', Nerine 'Dreams' and Paeonia 'Dojean'.

He was part of a plant collecting trip to Nepal in 1970 that brought back seedlings of Daphne bholua. A distinctive variety raised from seeds of these plants was later named D. bholua 'Peter Smithers '. He was awarded the Veitch Memorial Medal in 1993 and the Schulthess Garden prize in 2001 for his plant and horticultural activities.

At the end of his life, he was a Swiss citizen. He died on 8 June 2006 in Vico Morcote, Ticino, Switzerland, at the age of 92.

== Publications ==
As well as writing needed for his professional career, Smithers wrote several books for the general public. These included:

- Adventures of a Gardener (1995) The Harvill Press pp 211 ISBN 978-1860460593

Parliament of the United Kingdom
Preceded by George Jeger	Member of Parliament for Winchester; 1950–1964	Succeeded by Morgan Morgan-Giles
Political offices
Preceded by Lodovico Benvenuti	Secretary General of the Council of Europe; 16 March 1964 – 15 September 1969	Succeeded by Lujo Toncic-Sorinj
