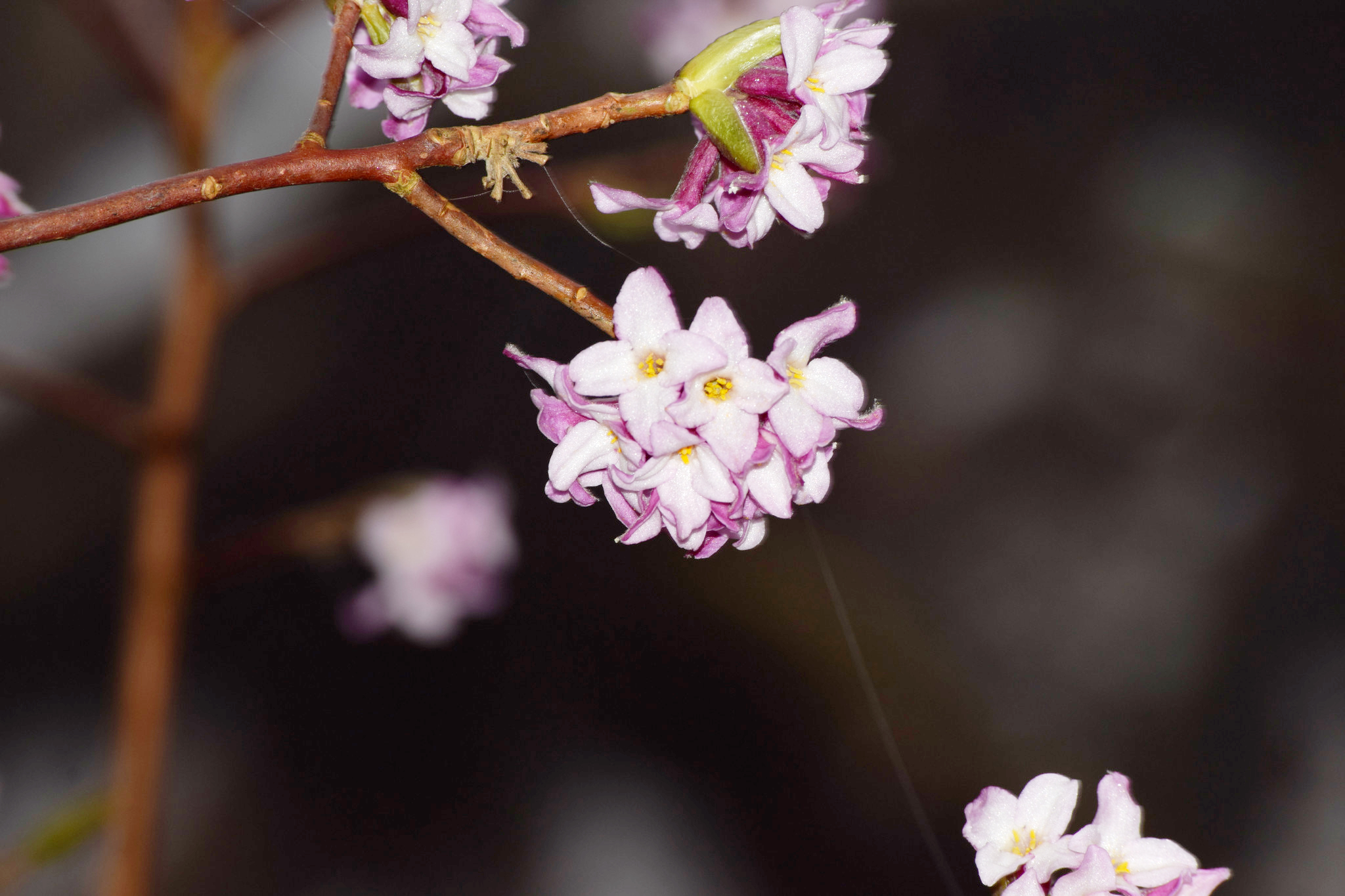
- Daphne bholua in flower in the Himalaya near Darjeeling, India

Scientific classification
- Kingdom: Plantae
- Clade: Embryophytes
- Clade: Tracheophytes
- Clade: Spermatophytes
- Clade: Angiosperms
- Clade: Eudicots
- Clade: Rosids
- Order: Malvales
- Family: Thymelaeaceae
- Genus: Daphne
- Species: D. bholua

Binomial name
- Daphne bholua Buch.-Ham. ex D. Don

Synonyms
- Daphne cannabina var. bholua (Buch.-Ham. ex D.Don) Keissl.

= Daphne bholua =

Species of shrub

Daphne bholua is a species of flowering shrub in the genus Daphne of the family Thymelaeaceae. It grows at altitudes of 1,700–3,500 m (5,577–11,483 ft) in the Himalayas and neighbouring mountain ranges, from Nepal to southern China and northwestern Vietnam. At lower altitudes it is found as an evergreen in thickets and forest margins; at higher altitudes, it is deciduous and is usually found in pastures and grassy glades. It usually reaches a height of about 2.5 m (8 ft 2 in), though some specimens reach 4 m (13 ft) or more.

Daphne bholua has leathery leaves and deep pink flowers with a powerful fragrance, and a number of named cultivars have been bred and are grown as garden plants in Europe and North America.

== Subspecies ==
As of October 2025, the Plants of the World Online (POWO) database accepts two varieties:

- Daphne bholua var. bholua
- Daphne bholua var. glacialis (W.W.Sm. & Cave) B.L.Burtt

Some sources have also accepted a subspecies D. bholua subsp. emeiensis; POWO and the online Flora of China treat this as the separate species Daphne emeiensis.

== Distribution ==
D. bholua has a wide range in the Himalayas and adjoining ranges, from Nepal through Bhutan, Bangladesh, Myanmar, to Sichuan and north-west Yunnan and northwestern Vietnam.

In Nepal, the plant's common name is baruwa; in Tibet it is chu chu. It has also been called "paper daphne" or "Nepalese paper plant" from its use in paper-making.

== Uses ==
D. bohlua is one of a number of species of Daphne that are used in traditional paper-making in Nepal.

The inner bark also yields a fibre that is used to make rope.

Although all parts of the plant are said to be poisonous, the bark and roots are used in traditional medicine in Nepal to treat fevers.

== Horticulture ==
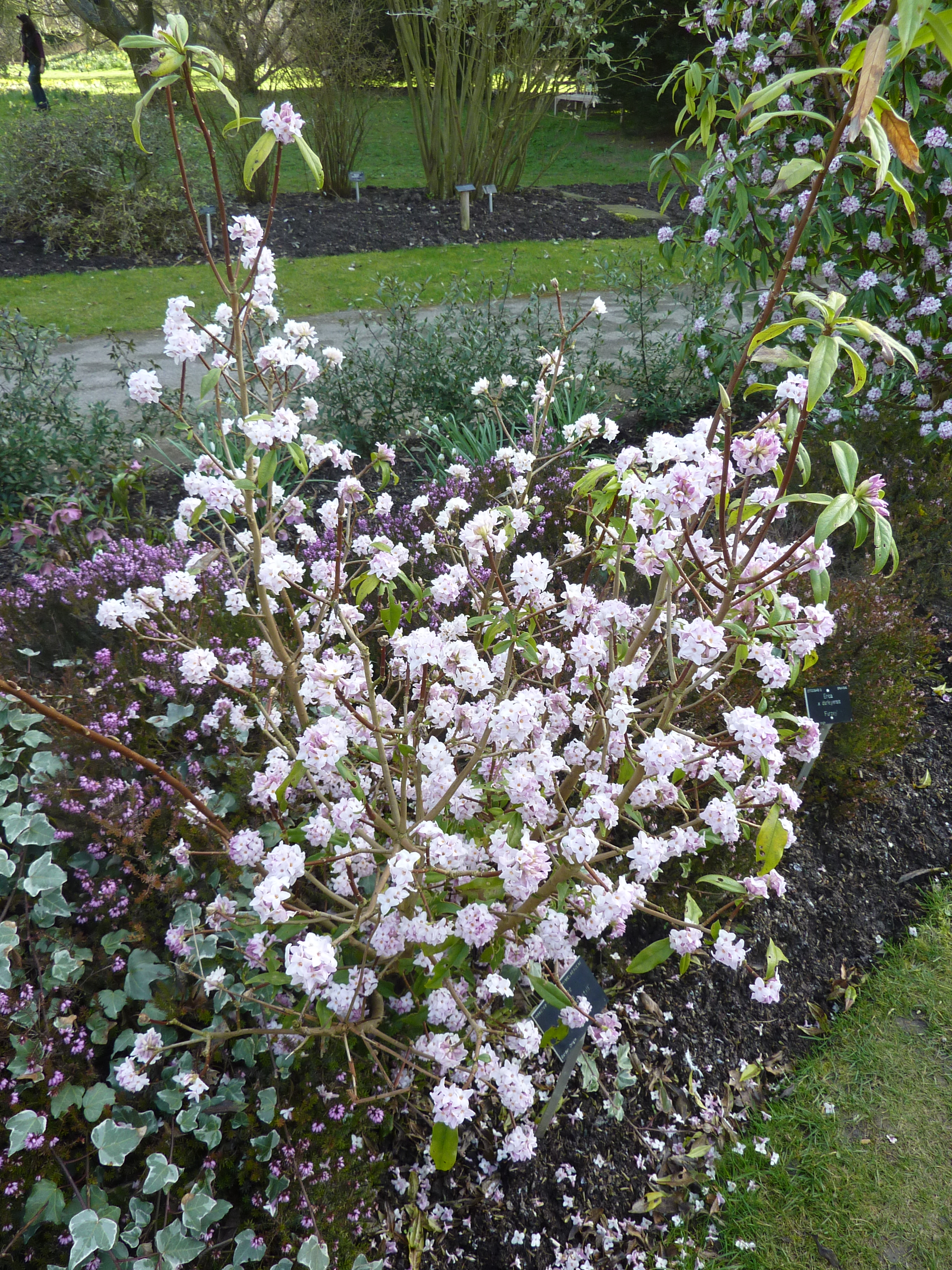
Daphne bholua 'Jacqueline Postill' in the Cambridge University Botanic Garden, England

=== Requirements ===
Most cultivars of Daphne bholua will grow in alkaline or acidic soils, though shallow chalky soils and light sandy soils, which dry out in hot weather, are unsuitable: a steady supply of moisture is essential during the growing season. A position that is sheltered both from the full sun and from strong winds is preferred.

=== Propagation ===
Because cultivated varieties of D bholua flower in winter, they tend not to produce much seed, and the seed has a short period of viability, so must be sown soon after collection, under gentle heat. Germination is usually complete within six to eight weeks. Plants sown from seed produce their first flowers after three or four years.

Most cultivars are very difficult to propagate from cuttings, being slow to root and to establish: D. bholua f. alba and D. bohlua 'Darjeeling' are reported to be the easiest cultivars to propagate from cuttings.

In view of the difficulties of growing from seed or cuttings, cultivars have traditionally been propagated by grafting cuttings onto the rootstock of a related species, usually D. longilobata or D. mezereum, which are more easily grown from seed. Even this is not reliable: plants that have grown well for eight to ten years may die suddenly when the root system collapses.

In recent years, some cultivars have been multiplied by micropropagation. Micropropagated plants produce suckers, like the wild species, so that even if the main stem dies, the suckers ensure that the plant will continue to flourish.

=== Cultivars ===
Among the more popular cultivars are (those marked AGM have gained the Royal Horticultural Society's Award of Garden Merit):

- D. bholua 'Ghurka' AGM — this variety was collected as seed on the Milke Danda ridge, Nepal, at around 3200 m; it is particularly tolerant of low temperatures, becoming deciduous at temperatures below about -10 °C. 'Ghurka' has a distinctive bright tan bark, with mauve-purple buds that open to pale pink flowers; it flowers between January and March.
- D. bholua 'Jacqueline Postill' AGM — this was developed from seed of the 'Ghurka' variety. It has flowers similar to those of its parent, with 12-15 flowers per inflorescence, but is more evergreen and is probably the hardiest evergreen variety in cultivation, for which reason it is the most widely available and most popular cultivar.
- D. bholua 'Darjeeling' — this was developed at the Royal Horticultural Society's gardens at Wisley in the late 1970s; it has a vigorous upright habit and produces white to pale pink buds and flowers, 5 to 15 per infloresescence, between November and January.
- D. bholua 'Peter Smithers' — this variety can be traced to seed collected by Sir Peter Smithers in the Daman Ridge area of Nepal; the buds are dark red-purple and the flowers are pink.
- D. bholua 'Rupina La' — this clone was collected in the Gurkha Himalaya, in central Nepal. A deciduous variety, it has large leaves and larger flowers than other varieties. The flowers are dusky pink, 3.5–4 in diameter, and there may be as many as 25 blooms on a single inflorescence.
