= Bickham Escott =

British politician (1800–1853)

Member of Parliament for Winchester
- In office 29 June 1841 – 3 August 1847 Serving with James Buller East
- Preceded by: James Buller East; Paulet St John-Mildmay
- Succeeded by: James Buller East; John Bonham-Carter

Personal details
- Born: 6 February 1800
- Died: 4 November 1853 (aged 53)
- Party: Radical
- Other political affiliations: Conservative

Bickham Escott (6 February 1800 – 4 November 1853) was a British Conservative Member of Parliament and, later, Radical politician.

After standing at a by-election in 1833 at Westminster, Escott was first elected Conservative MP for Winchester in 1841, and held the seat until the general election in 1847, when he was defeated. He then stood for Plymouth as a Radical at the 1852 general election, but was unsuccessful.

Parliament of the United Kingdom
| Preceded by James Buller East; Paulet St John-Mildmay | Member of Parliament for Winchester; 1841–1847; With: James Buller East | Succeeded by James Buller East; John Bonham-Carter |
