= John Bonham-Carter (1817–1884) =

English politician

John Bonham-Carter DL JP
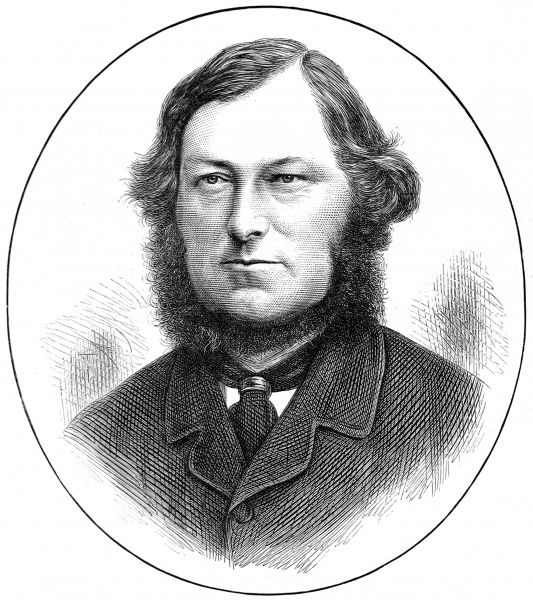

Deputy Speaker of the House of Commons Chairman of Ways and Means
- In office 1872–1874
- Preceded by: John George Dodson
- Succeeded by: Henry Cecil Raikes

Member of Parliament for Winchester
- In office 1847–1874 Serving with Sir James Buller East, Bt; Thomas Willis Fleming; William Barrow Simonds
- Preceded by: Sir James Buller East, Bt; Bickham Escott
- Succeeded by: William Barrow Simonds; Arthur Robert Naghten

Personal details
- Born: John Carter; 13 October 1817 Portsmouth
- Died: 26 November 1884 (aged 67) Petersfield, Hampshire
- Party: Liberal
- Spouses: Laura Maria Nicholson (m. 1848; died 1862) Mary Baring (m. 1864)
- Relations: See Bonham Carter family
- Parent(s): John Bonham-Carter; Joanna Maria Smith
- Education: Clifton College; Trinity College, Cambridge

John Bonham-Carter DL JP (13 October 1817 – 26 November 1884) was an English Liberal politician, member of the prominent Bonham Carter family.

== Early life ==
Jack Bonham-Carter was the son of Joanna Maria Smith (1792–1884) and the Portsmouth Member of Parliament John Bonham-Carter (1788–1838). Among his siblings was the artist Hilary Bonham Carter, a friend of political journalist Harriet Martineau, and Elinor Mary Bonham Carter, the wife of prominent jurist Albert Venn Dicey.

His paternal grandparents were Dorothy (née Cuthbert) Carter and Sir John Carter, who served as Mayor of Portsmouth. His maternal grandfather was abolitionist William Smith and through his aunt Frances, he was a first cousin of Florence Nightingale. His maternal uncle was Whig politician Benjamin Smith, father of his first cousins Barbara Bodichon and Benjamin Leigh Smith.

He was educated at Clifton College and Trinity College, Cambridge.

== Career ==
From 1847 to 1874, he was a Liberal MP for Winchester. He was briefly a Lord of the Treasury in 1866, and during his last two years in Parliament, he was Chairman of Ways and Means. In 1879, he served as High Sheriff of Hampshire, an office his father held in 1829.

He was a member of the Photographic Society of London, later the Royal Photographic Society, from 1853 until his death. He became Lord Mayor of London in 1859

From 1873 to 1884, he was a fellow of Winchester College.

== Personal life ==
In 1848, Bonham-Carter was married to his cousin Laura Maria Nicholson (c. 1825–1862). Laura was the daughter of barrister George Thomas Nicholson of Waverley Abbey and Anne Elizabeth (née Smith) Nicholson. Her eldest sister, Marianne, married engineer Douglas Strutt Galton, her brother was Lieutenant-General Sir Lothian Nicholson and her grandfather was the prominent merchant Samuel Nicholson. Together, they were the parents of:

- Amy Laura Bonham-Carter (c. 1849–1859), who died young.
- Iona Mary Bonham-Carter (b. c. 1850), who married Philip Edward Tillard (1836–1913).
- John Bonham-Carter III of Buriton (1852–1905), who married Mary Withers.
- Francis Bonham-Carter (1853–1878), who died unmarried in Darjeeling, West Bengal, India.
- Edith Joanna Bonham-Carter (1855–1899).
- Lothian Bonham-Carter (1858–1927), who married Emily Maud Sumner and played first-class cricket for Hampshire.
- Alice Laura Bonham-Carter (1860–1928), who married Brigadier-General Anthony Abdy.

After the death of his first wife in 1862, he remarried to the Hon. Mary Baring (c. 1828–1906) on 21 April 1864. Mary was the daughter of Francis Baring, 1st Baron Northbrook and the former Jane Grey (daughter of Sir George Grey, 1st Baronet). Mary was the granddaughter of Sir Thomas Baring, 2nd Baronet and sister of Thomas Baring, 1st Earl of Northbrook of the Barings Bank family. Together, they were the parents of:

- Mary Grey Bonham-Carter (c. 1867–1917)
- Arthur Thomas Bonham-Carter (1869-1916) served as a magistrate in the Transvaal from 1902 until 1905 when he was transferred to Mombasa. In 1906 he was appointed a Judge in the East African Protectorate. On the outbreak of war in 1914 he returned to the Hampshire Regiment, with whom he had served in the 1899-1901 South African War. He was killed on 1 July 1916 during the Somme offensive whilst leading an attack on the woods near Beaumont Hamel. There are no details of his death recorded in the regimental war diary for that day because all the officers of the 1st Battalion The Hampshire Regiment were either killed or injured.
- Amy Laura Bonham-Carter.

He died in Petersfield, Hampshire on 26 November 1884.

== See also ==
- Bonham Carter family

Parliament of the United Kingdom
Preceded by Sir James Buller East, Bt; Bickham Escott	Member of Parliament for Winchester; 1847–1874; With: Sir James Buller East, Bt 1847–1864; Thomas Willis Fleming 1864–1865; William Barrow Simonds 1865–1874	Succeeded by William Barrow Simonds; Arthur Robert Naghten
Political offices
Preceded by John George Dodson	Chairman of Ways and Means; 1872–1874	Succeeded by Henry Cecil Raikes
