= Edmund Picard =

English politician

Edmund Picard (died c. 1410) was an English politician. He sat as MP for Winchester in 1393, 1399 and 1406 and Mayor of Winchester from 1401 until 1402.

He also served as constable of Winchester from Michaelmas 1386 till 1387, commons' bailiff from 1388 till 1389, and bailiff of the 24 from 1391 until 1392.

By 1381, he married his first wife Alice, the widow of John Snell and by 1387, he married his second wife Margery and had two daughters.
