= William Barrow Simonds =

British politician (1820-1911)

William Barrow Simonds (28 August 1820 – 29 December 1911) was an English Conservative politician who sat in the House of Commons from 1865 to 1880.

Simonds was the son of William Simonds of St. Cross and Abbott's Barton, Hampshire and his wife Helen Barrow, daughter of John Barrow merchant of Bristol. He was educated at Merchant Taylors' School. He was a J.P. for Winchester and Hampshire, captain commanding the 1st Hampshire Volunteers, and auditor of King's College, Cambridge.

At the 1865 general election Simonds was elected member of parliament for Winchester. He held the seat until 1880.

Simonds died at the age of 91.

Simonds married Ellen Lampard Bowker, daughter of Frederick Bowker of Winchester in 1858.

Parliament of the United Kingdom
Preceded by Thomas Willis Fleming; John Bonham-Carter	Member of Parliament for Winchester; 1865 – 1880; With: John Bonham-Carter to 1874; Arthur Robert Naghten 1874–80	Succeeded by Viscount Baring; Richard Moss
