= John Caplyn (died c. 1603) =

English politician

John Caplyn (died c. 1603), of Southampton, was an English politician.

== Family ==
Caplyn was the son of John Caplyn, MP for Bodmin and Southampton. Following the death of his father, he inherited property in Southampton, a share in a Cornwall tin mine and the manor of South Stoneham, near Southampton. In November 1574 he married Anne, daughter of Thomas Chester of Almondsbury. They had no children. He sold South Stoneham in 1600.

== Career ==
He was a Member (MP) of the Parliament of England for Winchester in 1572, following his nomination by Bishop Horne. He became an alderman of Southampton and in 1592 he served as sheriff. In the 1590s he served as comptroller of the port of Southampton.

Parliament of England
Preceded by Thomas Michelborne; Richard Birde	Member of Parliament for Winchester; 1572; With: Thomas Michelborne and William Bethell	Succeeded by John Wolley; Thomas Fleming
