= Ultrasis =

Ultrasis Group Plc
- Ultrasis Logo
- Company type: Public
- Traded as: LSE: ULT
- Industry: Healthcare
- Founded: February 2000; 26 years ago
- Defunct: 2017
- Headquarters: London, United Kingdom
- Key people: Chairman; John Smith, Chief Executive Officer, Tuvi Orbach, Founder
- Products: Cognitive Behavioural Therapy healthcare products for stress; anxiety; Depression

Ultrasis Group Plc was a healthcare company previously based in the United Kingdom which developed computerised healthcare products based on Cognitive Behavioural Therapy (CBT). The company was dissolved in 2017.

Ultrasis was created when Villiers Plc acquired the Healthcare company Ultramind and renamed it Ultrasis in 1999. Ultramind was established by Tuvi Orbach to develop computerised applications empowering people to improve their wellbeing.

The company's products covered stress, anxiety and depression problems. One of the company's products (Beating the Blues) was recommended by the National Institute for Health and Clinical Excellence (NICE) as a treatment option for people with mild or moderate depression.

The companies customers included Kent County Council, whose order for a digital support programme caused their share price to increase in 2005. Ultrasis recorded their first pre-tax profit in 2009, which was mainly achieved from sales of their "Beating the Blues" software, which was the product responsible for 90% of their revenue. At this time, Primary Care Trusts in England were also customers of the business. The company provided written evidence to the governments health committee in October 2010.

In 2013, a financing agreement was secured with shareholder Paul Bell. Uncertainty surrounding NHS reforms, led to a decrease in revenues in the UK, with the company attempting to expand internationally, via a joint venture.

An AIM listing was cancelled in October 2014 resulting in a slump in company valuation, as the company struggled with financial difficulties. The companies subsidiary, Screenetics, entered administration in 2015, with parts of the business and assets sold to ToHealth. As a result, 34 jobs were saved, with the employees transferring to ToHealth. Shortly prior to administrators being appointed, a public sector contract had been terminated early.

A 2016 study that used "Beating the Blues", one of the companies previously top selling products, suggested the programme was no more effective than GP care. Ultrasis PLC was dissolved on 21 July 2017.
