= Robert Archer (English politician) =

Member of the Parliament of England

Robert Archer (fl. 1407–1411), of Winchester, Hampshire, was an English politician.

He was a member (MP) of the parliament of England for Winchester in 1407 and 1411.
