= Richard Moss =

English brewer and politician

Richard Moss (1823 – 2 March 1905) was an English brewer and Conservative politician who sat in the House of Commons in two periods between 1880 and 1892.

Moss was the son of Richard Moss of the City of London. He was educated privately and was involved in brewing interests in London before becoming a brewer in Winchester. He was secretary and later chairman of the County Brewers' Society and took part in the amendment of the licensing laws in 1869 and 1872. He was one time master of the Worshipful Company of Scriveners.

At the 1880 general election Moss was elected member of parliament for Winchester. He held the seat until 1885. He regained the seat in a by-election in 1888 and held it until 1892.

Moss died at the age of 81.

Moss married Mary Jeffreys Snow, daughter of John Wright Snow of London in 1858. Their daughter Ada Mary Moss married Howard Kemp Prossor at St Peter's Church, Pimlico, on 16 April 1914.

Parliament of the United Kingdom
| Preceded by William Barrow Simonds; Arthur Robert Naghten | Member of Parliament for Winchester; 1880 – 1885; With: Viscount Baring | Succeeded by Arthur Loftus Tottenham |
| Preceded by Arthur Loftus Tottenham | Member of Parliament for Winchester; 1888 – 1892 | Succeeded by William Myers |
