= John Caplyn (died c. 1569) =

English politician

John Caplyn (by 1516–1568/70), of Southampton, was an English administrator and politician.

== Family ==
He was the son of Richard Caplyn, a Southampton merchant and the brother of Nicholas Capyln, who was MP for Southampton in 1572. He was the father of John Caplyn, MP for Winchester in 1572.

== Career ==
By the mid-1530s he was deputy to Wymond Carew in the Duchy of Cornwall and succeeded him as deputy receiver-general in 1549. He also acted as deputy receiver-general for Katherine Parr. As a duchy official he was chosen to sit as Member (MP) of the Parliament of England for Bodmin in 1547. From 1547 he was active in Southampton's administration, serving as sheriff in 1550-1 and mayor 1552-4. He retained his role for the Duchy of Cornwall during the reign of Edward VI and again sat as MP for Bodmin in 1553. He was elected to sit for Southampton in 1563.
