= Sir Edward East, 1st Baronet =

British MP, legal writer, and judge in India (1764–1847)

Sir Edward East 1st Baronet
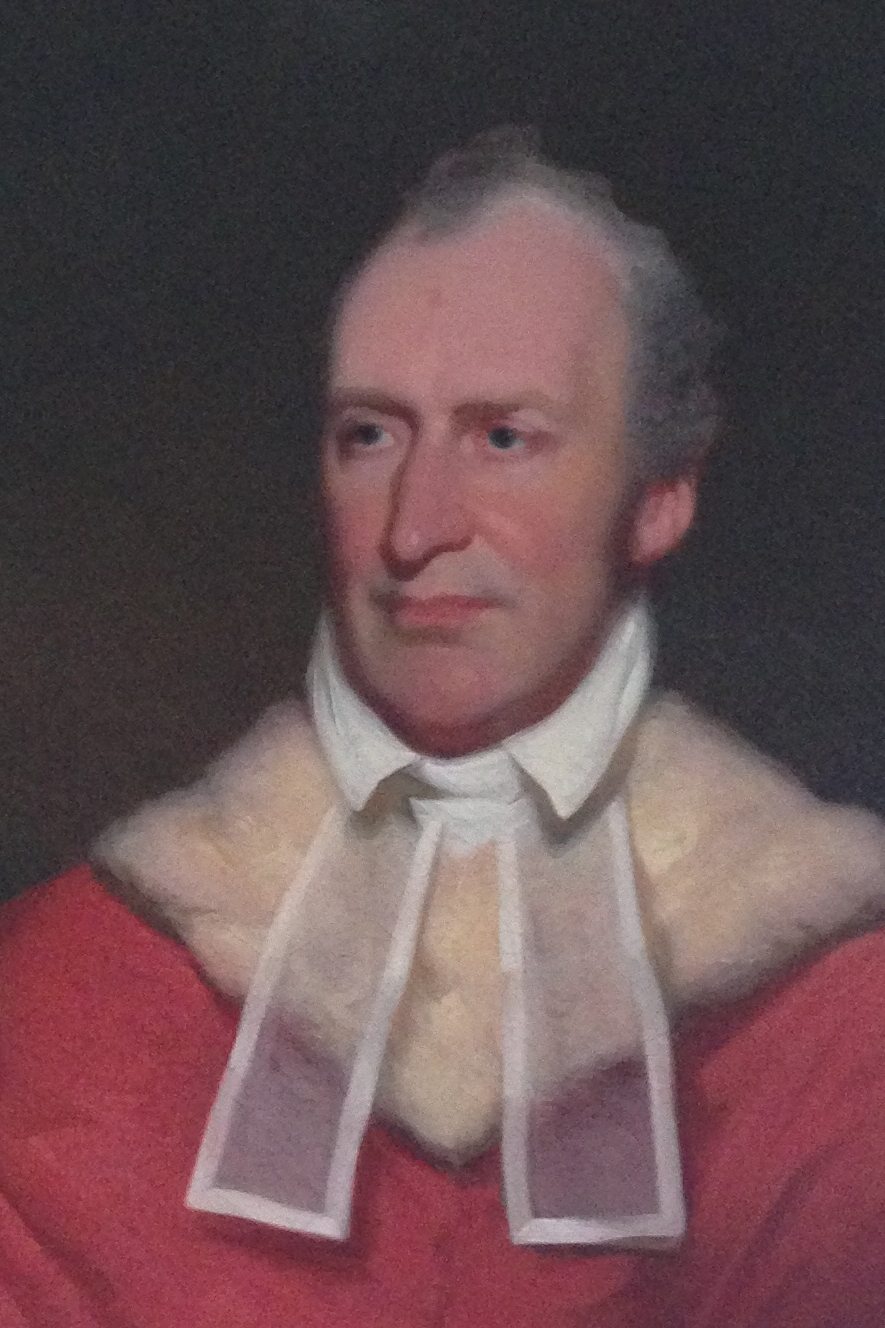

Chief Justice of the Supreme Court of Judicature at Fort William
- In office 1813–1822
- Preceded by: Sir Henry Russell, 1st Baronet
- Succeeded by: John Franks

Member of Parliament for Great Bedwin
- In office 1792–1796

Personal details
- Born: 9 September 1764 Jamaica
- Died: 8 January 1847 (aged 82) Battersea
- Profession: Barrister, Judge, Educator

Sir Edward Hyde East, 1st Baronet (9 September 1764 – 8 January 1847) was a British Member of Parliament, legal writer, and judge in India. He served as chief justice of Calcutta from 1813 to 1822. He was the first Principal of Hindu College (later Hindu School, Kolkata).

== Life ==
=== Early life ===
Edward Hyde East was born in Jamaica island on 9 September 1764. He was the great-grandson of Captain John East (aka Edward East) who was active in the English conquest of Jamaica. Hyde East owned a number of plantations at the behest of the King – George IV Prince Regent in Jamaica along with the people on them. He became a student of the Inner Temple, London, and was called to the bar on 10 November 1786. He sat in the parliament of 1792 for Great Bedwin, and steadily supported William Pitt.

=== Career in India ===
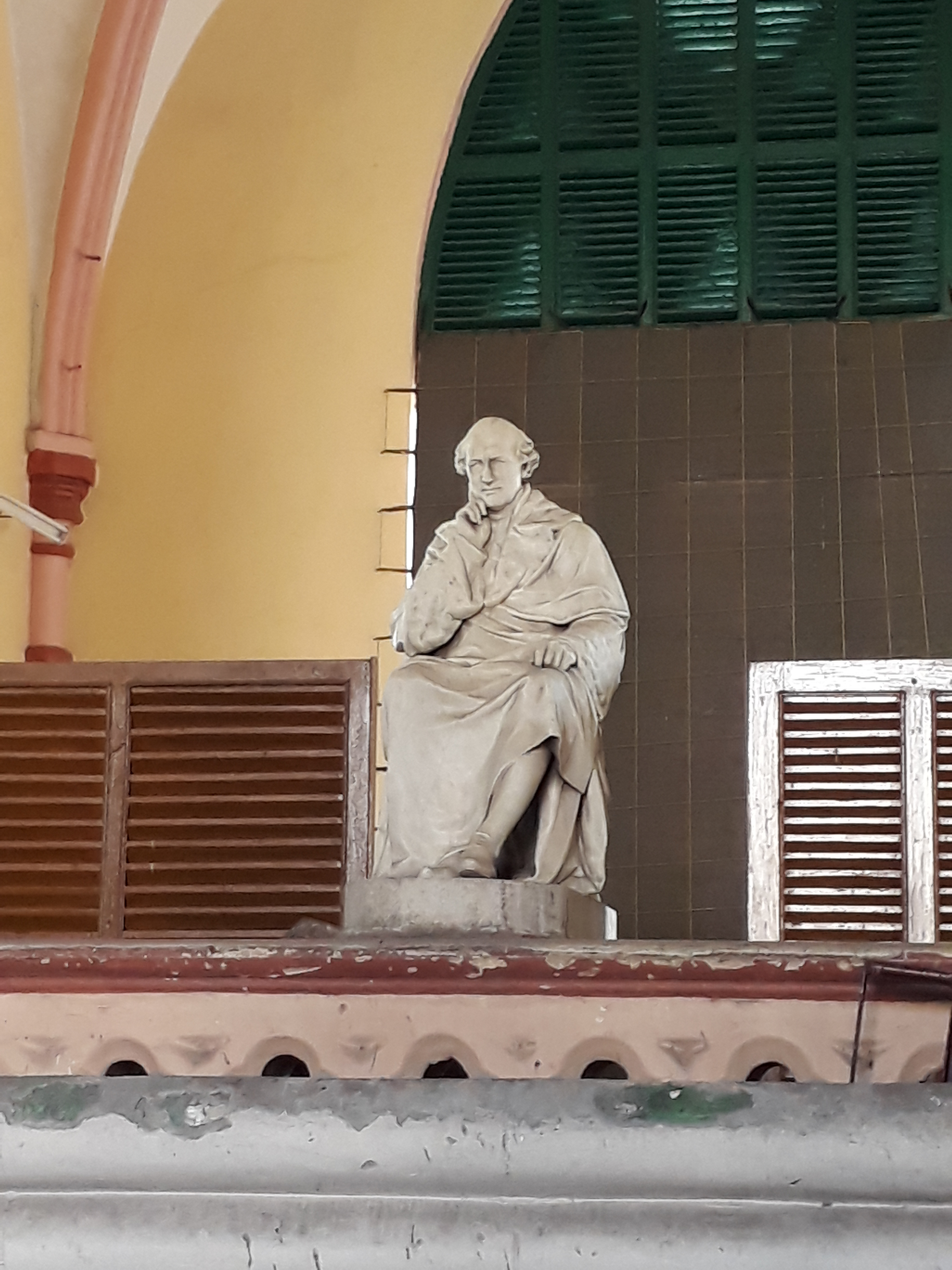
Statue of Sir Edward East in Calcutta High Court

In 1813 East was chosen to succeed Sir Henry Russell as chief justice of the supreme court at Fort William, Bengal. Before he left England he was knighted by the Prince Regent. Besides performing his judicial duties, he interested himself in Indian education, and was the chief promoter of the Hindu College. When he retired from office in 1822 the Indians presented him with an address and subscribed for a statue of him. This, executed by Francis Chantrey, was afterwards placed in the grand-jury room of the supreme court. On his return to the UK, East was made a baronet, on 25 April 1823.

=== Return to UK ===
East represented Winchester in parliament from 1823 to 1831, was sworn of the Privy Council, and appointed a member of the judicial committee of that body, in order to assist in the disposal of Indian appeals. He was also chosen a bencher of the Inner Temple and a fellow of the Royal Society.

East died at his residence, Sherwood Lodge, Battersea, on 8 January 1847.

== Works ==
East is known as a legal writer mainly for his Reports of Cases in the Court of King's Bench from Mich. Term, 26 Geo. III (1785), to Trin. Term, 40 Geo. III (1800) (8vo, 5 vols., 1817, by C. Durnford and E. H. East). These were the first law reports published regularly at the end of each term., and so were called the Term Reports. They were continued by East alone in his Reports of Cases argued and determined in the Court of King's Bench from Mich. Term, 41 Geo. III (1800), to Mich. Term, 53 Geo. III (1812), 1801, 1814. There are various American editions of both series. "No English reports", says Marvin, "are oftener cited in American courts than these" (Marvin, p. 282). East also wrote:

1. Pleas of the Crown; or a General Treatise on the Principles and Practice of Criminal Law, 2 vols. 1803. This, the result of fifteen years' labour, is based partly on a careful study of previous writers and on private collections of cases.
2. A Report of the Cases of Sir Francis Burdett against the Right Hon. Charles Abbott, 1811.

== Family ==
East married Jane Isabella Hankey in 1786. She was the second daughter of Joseph Chaplin Hankey the banker of East Bergholt, and sister of Joseph Chaplin Hankey the Member of Parliament for Wareham, and of Richard Hankey, Member of Parliament for Plympton Erle. They had a son and daughter. The son, James Buller East, succeeded him in the title. His wife predeceased him by three years.

== Notes ==
Baronetage of the United Kingdom
| New title | Baronet (of Calcutta); 1823–1847 | Succeeded by James Buller East |
