= East baronets =

Set index for East baronets

There have been two baronetcies created for persons with the surname East, one in the Baronetage of Great Britain and one in the Baronetage of the United Kingdom.

- East baronets of Hall Place (1766)
- East baronets of Calcutta (1823)
