= Winchester (constituency) =

Parliamentary constituency in the United Kingdom, 1918 onwards

- County constituency for the House of Commons
- Boundaries since 2024
- Boundary of Winchester in South East England
- County: Hampshire
- Electorate: 76,577 (2023)
- Major settlements: Winchester; Bishop's Waltham; New Alresford

Current constituency
- Created: 1918
- Member of Parliament: Danny Chambers (Liberal Democrat)
- Seats: One
- Created from: Andover, Fareham and Winchester (borough)
- During its existence contributed to new seat(s) of: North West Hampshire (1983); Meon Valley (2010)

Winchester
- Former borough constituency for the House of Commons
- County: Hampshire

1295–1918
- Seats: 1295–1885: Two; 1885–1918: One
- Replaced by: Winchester (county)

Winchester is a constituency (Note: A county constituency (for the purposes of election expenses and type of returning officer)) in Hampshire represented in the House of Commons of the UK Parliament since 2024 by Danny Chambers, a Liberal Democrat. (Note: As with all constituencies, the constituency elects one Member of Parliament (MP) by the first past the post system of election at least every five years.)

== Boundaries ==
Map of 2010–2024 boundaries

1918–1950: The Borough of Winchester, the Urban District of Eastleigh and Bishopstoke, the Rural Districts of Hursley and Winchester, and the Rural District of South Stoneham except the parish of Bittern.

1950–1955: The Boroughs of Eastleigh, Romsey, and Winchester, in the Rural District of Romsey and Stockbridge the parishes of Ampfield, Chilworth, East Dean, Lockerley, Melchet Park and Plaitford, Michelmersh, Mottisfont, North Baddesley, Nursling and Rownhams, Romsey Extra, Sherfield English, and Wellow, and part of the Rural District of Winchester.

1955–1974: The Boroughs of Romsey and Winchester, and parts of the Rural Districts of Romsey and Stockbridge, and Winchester.

1974–1983: The Municipal Boroughs of Andover and Winchester, the Rural District of Andover, and parts of the Rural Districts of Romsey and Stockbridge, and Winchester.

1983–1997: The City of Winchester wards of Bishop's Sutton, Bishop's Waltham, Cheriton, Compton, Durley and Upham, Itchen Valley, Littleton, Micheldever, New Alresford, Olivers Battery, Otterbourne and Hursley, Owlesbury and Colden Common, St Barnabas, St Bartholomew, St John and All Saints, St Luke, St Michael, St Paul, Sparsholt, The Worthys, Twyford, Upper Meon Valley, and Wonston, and the District of East Hampshire wards of Alton Holybourne, Alton North East, Alton North West, Alton South East, Alton South West and Beech, Farringdon, Four Marks, Medstead, North Downland and Ropley, and West Tisted.

1997–2010: The City of Winchester.

2010–2024: The City of Winchester wards of Colden Common and Twyford, Compton and Otterbourne, Itchen Valley, Kings Worthy, Littleton and Harestock, Olivers Battery and Badger Farm, St Barnabas, St Bartholomew, St John and All Saints, St Luke, St Michael, St Paul, Sparsholt, The Alresfords, and Wonston and Micheldever, and the Borough of Eastleigh wards of Chandler's Ford East, Chandler's Ford West, Hiltingbury East, and Hiltingbury West.

Parliament accepted the Boundary Commission's Fifth periodic review of Westminster constituencies by making slight changes to this constituency for the 2010 general election, removing 11 mostly rural wards in and around Bishops Waltham to a new seat, Meon Valley. In return, Winchester gained four suburban and partially urban wards at the northern edge of Eastleigh.

2024–present: Further to the 2023 review of Westminster constituencies which became effective for the 2024 general election, the constituency is composed of the following (as they existed on 1 December 2020):

- The City of Winchester wards of: Alresford & Itchen Valley; Badger Farm & Oliver’s Battery; Bishop’s Waltham; Central Meon Valley; Colden Common & Twyford; St. Barnabas; St. Bartholomew; St. Luke; St. Michael; St. Paul; The Worthys; Upper Meon Valley; Wonston & Micheldever.

The constituency again solely comprises areas within the City of Winchester local authority with the transfer of Chandler's Ford and Hiltingbury back to Eastleigh. Bishop's Waltham and the Meon valley area was transferred back from the abolished Meon Valley seat.

== History ==
=== 1295–1885 ===
The chartered city sent burgesses (equivalent to advisory MPs) to the Model Parliament of 1295 and then to most Parliaments convened by the monarch in the medieval period and thereafter; its representation being fixed at two in number during this long period of English history. As is common, major disruption in representation caused by both infrequency of Parliaments convened and allegiance of the incumbents (whether a Royalist or a Parliamentarian) led to sporadic representation during the Protectorate of England and its Commonwealth which followed the end of most fighting during the English Civil War, in this case the stripping of wealth and status from Sir William Ogle followed his being supportive of the wrong faction at the wrong time.

=== 1885–present ===
The Redistribution of Seats Act 1885 reduced the narrow borough constituency that elected two MPs to only one, permitting the creation of new broader replacement seats in surrounding Hampshire countryside for two abolished boroughs: Andover and Fareham (also known as West and South Hampshire respectively).

=== Political history ===
The seat was a Conservative safe seat in terms of majority and length of time held from 1950 until 1997.

At the 1997 general election the incumbent MP Gerry Malone of the Conservative Party was defeated by Mark Oaten of the Liberal Democrats by just two votes. This was the closest result in any of the 659 constituencies contested at the 1997 general election, followed by the Liberal Democrats 12 vote majority (also over the Conservatives) in Torbay. Malone petitioned the result and it was declared void by the High Court on the grounds of mis-stamped ballots having altered the outcome, necessitating a by-election. This was won definitively by Oaten with a very large majority of 21,556, in an election that saw the Labour vote collapse to 1.7% hence the candidate, Patrick Davies, losing his deposit.

The events of 1997 swung the constituency strongly away from its usual status as a fairly safe Conservative seat.

Avoidance of confusion in party names

The candidacy of Richard Huggett in both 1997 elections as a "Literal Democrat" candidate led in part to the creation of the Registration of Political Parties Act 1998.

Oaten stood down at the 2010 general election and was replaced as Liberal Democrat candidate by Martin Tod. Following significant boundary changes, Tod was defeated by Conservative candidate Steve Brine, who took the seat with a majority of 3,048 votes. Brine held the seat in 2015, 2017 and 2019, although in 2019 his majority was reduced to just 985 votes over Paula Ferguson of the Liberal Democrats, making Winchester one of the most marginal seats in the UK.

Brine stood down for the 2024 election and Flick Drummond, the incumbent MP for the now abolished seat of Meon Valley, was selected for the Conservatives, having failed to be selected for the new seat of Fareham and Waterlooville. However, despite boundary changes favouring the Conservative Party, she was easily defeated by the Liberal Democrats' Danny Chambers after a notional swing of 19.2%.

Prominent frontbenchers

- Sir George Hennessy was a senior whip (Vice-Chamberlain of the Household then Treasurer of the Household) from 1925 to 1929, being given the style 'sir' through a baronetcy in 1927.
- Peter Smithers resigned the seat in 1964 to serve as Secretary General of the Council of Europe until 1969.
- Gerry Malone became a Health Minister in 1994.
- Mark Oaten became Liberal Democrat Home Affairs Spokesman from 2003 until January 2006.

== Constituency profile ==
The constituency is in mid-Hampshire and comprises the bulk of the large City of Winchester District. The largest settlements after Winchester itself are Bishop's Waltham, New Alresford and Kings Worthy.

The ancient capital of Wessex, Winchester is a cathedral city with the arts and humanities-oriented University and an affluent population. Poverty is very low, and the population is a mixture of students, academics, London and Southampton commuters, and those employed locally in high-tech and creative industries.

Workless claimants who were registered jobseekers were in November 2012 significantly lower than the national average of 3.8%, at 1.4% of the population based on a statistical compilation by The Guardian.

== Members of Parliament ==
- Constituency created (1295)

=== 1295–1660 ===
Parliament	First member	Second member
1386	Richard Frye	Mark Le Faire
1388 (February)	Mark Le Faire	Gilbert Forster
1388 (September)	William Wygge	John Blake
1390 (January)	Mark Le Faire	John West
1390 (November)		
1391	Mark Le Faire	Gilbert Forster
1393	Mark Le Faire	Edmund Picard
1394	John Peverel	Richard Gould
1395	Mark Le Faire	John Blake
1397 (January)	Henry Clerk	Nicholas Tanner
1397 (September)	William Bolt	Richard Pachford
1399	Mark Le Faire	Edmund Picard
1401		
1402	John Snell	John Steor
1404 (January)		
1404 (October)		
1406	Thomas Smale	Edmund Picard
1407	John Steor	Robert Archer
1410		
1411	Mark Le Faire	Robert Archer
1413 (February)	Mark Le Faire	William Wood
1413 (May)	Mark Le Faire	William Wood
1414 (April)		
1414 (November)	Mark Le Faire	William Wood
1415	Richard Gould	Richard Bolt
1416 (March)	Mark Le Faire	William Wood
1416 (October)	Richard Turnaunt	William Reson
1417	Mark Le Faire	Richard Turnaunt
1419	Richard Bolt	Richard Turnaunt
1420	William Reson	William Wood
1421 (May)	John French	William Wood
1421 (December)	John French	Thomas Cutler
1510-1523	No names known	
1529	William Hawles	Thomas Coke, died and replaced after 1532 by ?Walter Chandler
1536	?William Hawles	?Walter Chandler
1539	Thomas Lee	?
1542	Walter Chandler	?
1545	?	
1547	William Honing	John Foster
1553 (March)	Richard Bethell	William Lawrence I
1553 (October)	Richard Bethell	William Lawrence I
1554 (April)	William Lawrence I	Robert Hodson
1554 (November)	William Lawrence I	Robert Hodson
1555	William Lawrence I	Robert Hodson
1558	Giles White	William Lawrence I
1559 (January)	William Lawrence	Robert Bethell
1562 (December)	William Lawrence	Thomas Michelborne
1571	Thomas Michelborne	Richard Birde?
1572 (May)	Thomas Michelborne, died and replaced in January 1583 by William Bethell	John Caplyn
1584 (November)	John Wolley	Thomas Fleming I
1586 (October)	John Wolley	Thomas Fleming I
1588 (October)	Thomas Fleming I	Francis Mylles
1593	Sir Edward Stafford	Thomas Fleming I
1597 (October)	William Badger	John Moore
1601 (October)	Edward Cole	Sir Thomas Fleming II
1604	John Moore	Edward Cole
1614	Sir William Sandys	Sir Thomas Bilson
1621	Richard Tichborne	William Savage
1624	Richard Tichborne	James Lord Wriothesley
1625	Richard Tichborne	Sir Thomas Phelipps
1626	Richard Tichborne	Henry Whitehead
1628	Richard Tichborne	Robert Mason
1629–1640	No Parliaments summoned	
1640 (April)	John Lisle	Sir William Ogle
1640 (November)	John Lisle	Sir William Ogle, disabled June 1643 replaced in 1645 by Nicholas Love
1654	John Hildesley	
1656	John Hildesley	
1659	John Hildesley	Nicholas Love
1659	John Lisle	Nicholas Love

=== MPs 1660–1885 ===
Year	First member	First party	Second member	Second party
1660	John Hooke		Thomas Cole	
1660	John Hooke		Charles Paulet	
1661	Richard Goddard		Lawrence Hyde	
1666	Sir Robert Mason		Lawrence Hyde	
1669	Sir Robert Holmes		Lawrence Hyde	
1679	James Annesley		Sir John Cloberry	
1685	Roger L'Estrange		Charles Hanses	
1689	Francis Morley		Lord William Powlett	
1690	Frederick Tylney		Lord William Powlett	
1701	George Rodney Brydges		Lord William Powlett	
1710	George Rodney Brydges		Thomas Lewis	
1714	George Brydges		John Popham	
1715	George Brydges		Lord William Powlett	
1730	George Brydges		Norton Powlett	
1734	George Brydges		Paulet St John	
1741	George Brydges		William Powlett	
1747	George Brydges		Henry Penton	
1751	Paulet St John		Henry Penton	
1754	James Brydges		Henry Penton	
1761	Henry Penton		Lord Harry Powlett	
1765	Henry Penton		George Paulet	
1774	Henry Penton		Lovell Stanhope	
1783	Henry Penton		Henry Flood	
1784	Henry Penton		Richard Grace Gamon	
1796	Henry Temple, 2nd Viscount Palmerston		Richard Grace Gamon	
1802	Sir Henry St John-Mildmay		Richard Grace Gamon	
1807	Sir Henry St John-Mildmay		Richard Grace Gamon	
1812	Sir Henry St John-Mildmay		Richard Meyler	
1818	James Henry Leigh	Tory	Richard Meyler	
1818	James Henry Leigh	Tory	Paulet St John-Mildmay	Whig
1823	Sir Edward East	Tory	Paulet St John-Mildmay	Whig
1831	James Buller East	Tory	Paulet St John-Mildmay	Whig
1832	Bingham Baring	Whig	Paulet St John-Mildmay	Whig
1835	Bingham Baring	Whig	Sir James Buller East	Conservative
1837	Paulet St John-Mildmay	Whig	Sir James Buller East	Conservative
1841	Bickham Escott	Conservative	Sir James Buller East	Conservative
1847	John Bonham-Carter	Whig	Sir James Buller East	Conservative
1859	John Bonham-Carter	Liberal	Sir James Buller East	Conservative
1864 by-election	John Bonham-Carter	Liberal	Thomas Willis Fleming	Conservative
1865	John Bonham-Carter	Liberal	William Barrow Simonds	Conservative
1874	Arthur Robert Naghten	Conservative	William Barrow Simonds	Conservative
1880	Francis Baring	Liberal	Richard Moss	Conservative
1885	Representation reduced to one member			

=== MPs since 1885 ===
Election	Member	Party	Notes
1885	Arthur Loftus Tottenham	Conservative	Died December 1887
1888 by-election	Richard Moss	Conservative	
1892	William Myers	Conservative	
1906	Guy Baring	Conservative	Died September 1916
1916 by-election	Douglas Carnegie	Conservative	
1917	Douglas Carnegie	National	
Constituency merged with the majority of the abolished seat of Andover and part of Fareham
1918	George Hennessy	Conservative	
1931	Geoffrey Ellis	Conservative	
1935	Gerald Palmer	Conservative	
1945	George Jeger	Labour	
1950	Peter Smithers	Conservative	Resigned in January 1964 to become Secretary General of the Council of Europe
1964 by-election	Morgan Morgan-Giles	Conservative	
1979	John Browne	Conservative	
Constituency split, part merged with part of the abolished seat of Petersfield, remainder merged with part of Basingstoke to form the new seat of North West Hampshire
1983	John Browne	Conservative	
March 1992	John Browne	Ind. Conservative	
April 1992	Gerry Malone	Conservative	Member for Aberdeen South (1983–1987), Minister of State for Health (1994–1997)
1997	Mark Oaten	Liberal Democrats	Liberal Democrat Home Affairs spokesperson (2003–2006)
2010	Steve Brine	Conservative	
Sep 2019	Steve Brine	Independent	
Oct 2019	Steve Brine	Conservative	
2024	Danny Chambers	Liberal Democrats	

== Election results 1983–present ==
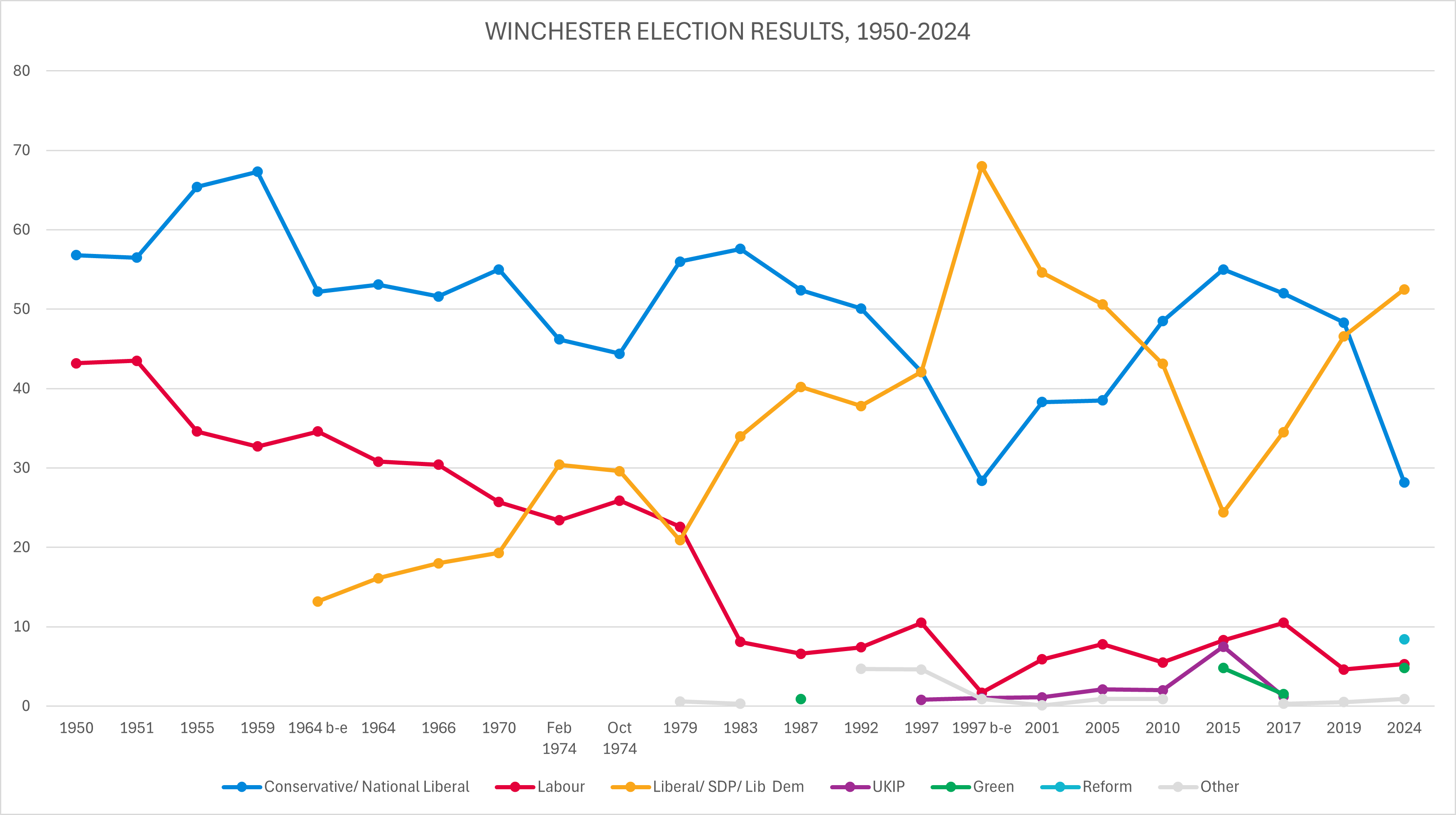
Election results 1950-2024

=== Elections in the 2020s ===
General election 2024: Winchester
Party	Candidate	Votes	%	±%
Liberal Democrats	Danny Chambers	29,939	52.5	+12.6
Conservative	Flick Drummond	16,118	28.2	–25.8
Reform	Sean Whelan	4,797	8.4	N/A
Labour	Hannah Dawson	3,023	5.3	+0.5
Green	Lorraine Estelle	2,740	4.8	+3.9
SDP	Andrew Davis	146	0.3	N/A
Independent	Chris Barfoot	142	0.3	N/A
Independent	Kevin D'Cruze	127	0.2	N/A
Hampshire Ind.	Andy Liming	44	0.1	N/A
Majority		13,821	24.2	N/A
Turnout		57,076	72.9	–10.6
Registered electors		78,289		
Liberal Democrats gain from Conservative		Swing	▲19.2	

=== Elections in the 2010s ===
2019 notional result
Party	Vote	%
Conservative	34,522	54.0
Liberal Democrats	25,472	39.9
Labour	3,039	4.8
Green	586	0.9
Others	292	0.5
Turnout	63,911	83.5
Electorate	76,577	

General election 2019: Winchester
Party	Candidate	Votes	%	±%
Conservative	Steve Brine	28,430	48.3	–3.7
Liberal Democrats	Paula Ferguson	27,445	46.6	+12.1
Labour	George Baker	2,723	4.6	–5.9
JAC	Teresa Skelton	292	0.5	+0.2
Majority		985	1.7	–15.8
Turnout		58,890	77.9	–1.1
Conservative hold		Swing	–7.9	

General election 2017: Winchester
Party	Candidate	Votes	%	±%
Conservative	Steve Brine	29,729	52.0	–3.0
Liberal Democrats	Jackie Porter	19,730	34.5	+10.1
Labour	Mark Chaloner	6,007	10.5	+2.2
Green	Andrew Wainwright	846	1.5	–3.3
UKIP	Martin Lyon	695	1.2	–6.3
JAC	Teresa Skelton	149	0.3	New
Majority		9,999	17.5	–13.1
Turnout		57,156	79.0	+4.4
Conservative hold		Swing	–6.5	

General election 2015: Winchester
Party	Candidate	Votes	%	±%
Conservative	Steve Brine	30,425	55.0	+6.5
Liberal Democrats	Jackie Porter	13,511	24.4	–18.7
Labour	Mark Chaloner	4,613	8.3	+2.8
UKIP	Martin Lyon	4,122	7.5	+5.5
Green	Michael Wilks	2,645	4.8	New
Majority		16,914	30.6	+25.2
Turnout		53,316	74.6	–1.2
Conservative hold		Swing	+12.6	

General election 2010: Winchester
Party	Candidate	Votes	%	±%
Conservative	Steve Brine	27,155	48.5	+11.2
Liberal Democrats	Martin Tod	24,107	43.1	–7.0
Labour	Patrick Davies	3,051	5.5	–3.9
UKIP	Jocelyn Penn-Bull	1,139	2.0	–0.2
English Democrat	Mark Lancaster	503	0.9	New
Majority		3,048	5.4	N/A
Turnout		55,955	75.8	+3.9
Registered electors		73,806		+2,553
Conservative gain from Liberal Democrats		Swing	+9.1	

2005 notional result
Party	Vote	%
Liberal Democrats	25,621	50.0
Conservative	19,097	37.4
Labour	4,774	9.3
UKIP	1,133	2.2
Others	581	1.1
Turnout	51,206	71.9
Electorate	71,253	

=== Elections in the 2000s ===
General election 2005: Winchester
Party	Candidate	Votes	%	±%
Liberal Democrats	Mark Oaten	31,225	50.6	−4.0
Conservative	George Hollingbery	23,749	38.5	+0.2
Labour	Patrick Davies	4,782	7.8	+1.9
UKIP	David Abbott	1,321	2.1	+1.0
Independent	Arthur Uther Pendragon	581	0.9	New
Majority		7,473	12.1	−4.2
Turnout		61,655	71.9	−0.4
Liberal Democrats hold		Swing	−2.1	

General election 2001: Winchester
Party	Candidate	Votes	%	±%
Liberal Democrats	Mark Oaten	32,282	54.6	+12.5
Conservative	Andrew Hayes	22,648	38.3	−3.8
Labour	Stephen Wyeth	3,498	5.9	−4.6
UKIP	Joan Martin	664	1.1	+0.3
Wessex Regionalists	Henrietta Rous	66	0.1	New
Majority		9,634	16.3	+16.3
Turnout		59,158	72.3	−6.3
Liberal Democrats hold		Swing		

Note: The percentage differences are compared to the previous general election poll, not the by-election.

=== Elections in the 1990s ===
1997 Winchester by-election
Party	Candidate	Votes	%	±%
Liberal Democrats	Mark Oaten	37,006	68.0	+25.9
Conservative	Gerry Malone	15,450	28.4	−13.7
Labour	Patrick Davies	944	1.7	−8.8
UKIP	Robin Page	521	1.0	+0.2
Monster Raving Loony	Screaming Lord Sutch	316	0.6	+0.1
Literal Democrat Mark Here To Win	Richard Huggett	59	0.1	−0.9
Natural Law	Rosemary Barry	48	0.1	New
Ind. Conservative	Roger Everest	40	0.1	New
Majority		21,556	39.6	N/A
Turnout		54,384	68.7	−9.9
Liberal Democrats gain from Conservative		Swing	+19.8	

General election 1997: Winchester
Party	Candidate	Votes	%	±%
Liberal Democrats	Mark Oaten	26,100	42.060	+5.2
Conservative	Gerry Malone	26,098	42.057	−9.6
Labour	Patrick Davies	6,528	10.5	+3.0
Referendum	Peter Strand	1,598	2.6	New
"Liberal Democrat Top Choice for Parliament"	Richard Huggett	640	1.0	New
UKIP	Derek Rumsey	476	0.8	New
Ind. Conservative	John Browne	307	0.5	−4.2
Monster Raving Loony	Peter Stockton	307	0.5	New
Majority		2	0.003	N/A
Turnout		62,054	78.6	–5.3
Registered electors		78,884		+3,761
Void election result		Swing	+7.4	

Note: The result reflects the official return made at the time. It was subsequently declared void upon petition. Because of the presence on the ballot paper of Richard Huggett as "Liberal Democrat Top Choice for Parliament", Oaten used the description "Liberal Democrat: Leader: Paddy Ashdown" to identify himself as the official Liberal Democrat candidate.

1992 notional result
Party	Vote	%
Conservative	32,604	51.7
Liberal Democrats	23,286	36.9
Labour	4,734	7.5
Others	2,468	3.9
Turnout	63,092	84.0
Electorate	75,123	

General election 1992: Winchester
Party	Candidate	Votes	%	±%
Conservative	Gerry Malone	33,113	50.1	−2.3
Liberal Democrats	Tony Barron	24,992	37.8	−2.4
Labour	PJ Jenks	4,917	7.4	+0.8
Ind. Conservative	John Browne	3,095	4.7	New
Majority		8,121	12.3	+0.1
Turnout		66,117	83.2	+2.8
Conservative hold		Swing	+0.1	

=== Elections in the 1980s ===
General election 1987: Winchester
Party	Candidate	Votes	%	±%
Conservative	John Browne	32,195	52.4	−5.2
SDP (Liberal)	John MacDonald	24,716	40.2	+6.2
Labour	Fred Inglis	4,028	6.6	−1.5
Green	Julie Walker	565	0.9	New
Majority		7,479	12.2	−11.4
Turnout		76,507	80.4	+4.2
Conservative hold		Swing	−5.7	

General election 1983: Winchester
Party	Candidate	Votes	%	±%
Conservative	John Browne	31,908	57.6	–2.2
SDP (Liberal)	John MacDonald	18,861	34.0	+11.4
Labour	William Allchin	4,512	8.1	–9.1
Wessex Regionalists	S. Winkworth	155	0.3	–0.1
Majority		13,047	23.6	–13.6
Turnout		55,436	76.2	
Registered electors		72,792		
Conservative hold		Swing	–6.8	

1979 notional result
Party	Vote	%
Conservative	32,469	59.8
Liberal	12,313	22.7
Labour	9,343	17.2
Others	198	0.4
Turnout	54,323	
Electorate		

== Election results 1918–1983 ==
=== Elections in the 1970s ===
General election 1979: Winchester
Party	Candidate	Votes	%	±%
Conservative	John Browne	38,198	56.01	
Labour	W.H. Allchin	15,378	22.55	
Liberal	J. Morgan	14,228	20.86	
Wessex Regionalists	M. Mahoney	395	0.58	New
Majority		22,820	33.46	
Turnout		68,199	78.02	
Registered electors				
Conservative hold		Swing		

General election October 1974: Winchester
Party	Candidate	Votes	%	±%
Conservative	Morgan Morgan-Giles	27,671	44.43	
Liberal	J.W. Matthew	18,451	29.63	
Labour	W.H. Allchin	16,153	25.94	
Majority		9,220	14.80	
Turnout		62,275	75.22	
Registered electors				
Conservative hold		Swing		

General election February 1974: Winchester
Party	Candidate	Votes	%	±%
Conservative	Morgan Morgan-Giles	30,843	46.1	–6.3
Liberal	J.W. Matthew	20,339	30.4	+13.8
Labour	W.H. Allchin	15,655	23.4	–7.5
Majority		10,504	15.7	–5.9
Turnout		66,837	81.5	+7.0
Registered electors		82,022		+3,730
Conservative hold		Swing	–10.1	

1970 notional result
Party	Vote	%
Conservative	30,600	52.5
Labour	18,000	30.9
Liberal	9,700	16.6
Turnout	58,300	74.5
Electorate	78,292	

General election 1970: Winchester
Party	Candidate	Votes	%	±%
Conservative	Morgan Morgan-Giles	25,249	55.02	
Labour	Christopher Perry	11,773	25.66	
Liberal	John W. Matthew	8,867	19.32	
Majority		13,476	29.36	
Turnout		45,889	74.56	
Conservative hold		Swing		

=== Elections in the 1960s ===
General election 1966: Winchester
Party	Candidate	Votes	%	±%
Conservative	Morgan Morgan-Giles	21,162	51.57	−
Labour	Stanley E. Spicer	12,485	30.42	
Liberal	E Terence S. Read	7,390	18.01	
Majority		8,677	21.15	
Turnout		41,037	77.87	
Conservative hold		Swing		

General election 1964: Winchester
Party	Candidate	Votes	%	±%
Conservative	Morgan Morgan-Giles	21,502	53.08	
Labour	C Patrick Seyd	12,495	30.85	
Liberal	E Terence S. Read	6,510	16.07	N/A
Majority		9,007	22.23	
Turnout		40,507	79.79	
Conservative hold		Swing		

1964 Winchester by-election
Party	Candidate	Votes	%	±%
Conservative	Morgan Morgan-Giles	18,032	52.17	15.09
Labour	C Patrick Seyd	11,968	34.62	+1.88
Liberal	J. Edwards	4,567	13.21	New
Majority		6,064	17.55	−26.98
Turnout		34,567		
Conservative hold		Swing		

=== Elections in the 1950s ===
General election 1959: Winchester
Party	Candidate	Votes	%	±%
Conservative	Peter Smithers	24,924	67.26	
Labour	Margaret J. Manning	12,132	32.74	
Majority		12,792	44.52	
Turnout		37,056	76.69	
Conservative hold		Swing		

General election 1955: Winchester
Party	Candidate	Votes	%
Conservative	Peter Smithers	23,827	65.43
Labour	Jasper Ridley	12,591	34.57
Majority		11,236	30.86
Turnout		36,418	76.73
Registered electors			
Conservative win (new boundaries)			

General election 1951: Winchester
Party	Candidate	Votes	%	±%
Conservative	Peter Smithers	31,700	56.49	
Labour	Eric Charles Neate	24,418	43.51	
Majority		7,282	12.98	
Turnout		56,118	83.66	
Conservative hold		Swing		

General election 1950: Winchester
Party	Candidate	Votes	%	±%
Conservative	Peter Smithers	31,462	56.77	
Labour Co-op	L. F. Cornillie	23,955	43.23	
Majority		7,507	13.54	N/A
Turnout		55,417	84.02	
Conservative gain from Labour		Swing		

=== Election in the 1940s ===
General election 1945: Winchester
Party	Candidate	Votes	%	±%
Labour	George Jeger	30,290	52.63	
Conservative	Gerald Palmer	27,259	47.37	
Majority		3,031	5.26	N/A
Turnout		57,819	71.70	
Labour gain from Conservative		Swing		

=== Elections in the 1930s ===
General election 1935: Winchester
Party	Candidate	Votes	%	±%
Conservative	Gerald Palmer	28,506	64.43	
Labour	Leonard Williams	15,739	35.57	
Majority		12,767	28.86	
Turnout		44,245	71.15	
Conservative hold		Swing		

General election 1931: Winchester
Party	Candidate	Votes	%	±%
Conservative	Geoffrey Ellis	31,131	69.71	
Labour	Robert Arthur Lyster	13,529	30.29	
Majority		17,602	39.42	
Turnout		44,660	77.14	
Conservative hold		Swing		

=== Elections in the 1920s ===
General election 1929: Winchester
Party	Candidate	Votes	%	±%
Unionist	George Hennessy	17,560	44.8	−12.4
Labour	Robert Arthur Lyster	14,326	36.6	+5.3
Liberal	Frances Josephy	7,278	18.6	+7.1
Majority		3,234	8.2	−17.7
Turnout		39,164	74.6	+2.8
Registered electors		52,522		
Unionist hold		Swing	−8.9	

General election 1924: Winchester
Party	Candidate	Votes	%	±%
Unionist	George Hennessy	15,026	57.2	+10.4
Labour	Reginald Stamp	8,216	31.3	+4.2
Liberal	William West	3,012	11.5	−14.6
Majority		6,810	25.9	+6.2
Turnout		26,254	71.8	+3.9
Registered electors		36,583		
Unionist hold		Swing	+3.1	

William West, the Liberal candidate in Winchester in the 1923 and 1924 elections

General election 1923: Winchester
Party	Candidate	Votes	%	±%
Unionist	George Hennessy	11,240	46.8	−18.5
Labour	Reginald Stamp	6,495	27.1	−7.6
Liberal	William West	6,252	26.1	New
Majority		4,745	19.7	−10.9
Turnout		23,987	67.9	+4.1
Registered electors		35,324		
Unionist hold		Swing	−5.5	

General election 1922: Winchester
Party	Candidate	Votes	%	±%
Unionist	George Hennessy	14,173	65.3	+0.7
Labour	Alexander Haycock	7,535	34.7	New
Majority		6,638	30.6	+1.4
Turnout		21,708	63.8	+15.7
Registered electors		34,045		
Unionist hold		Swing	+0.7	

=== Elections in the 1910s ===
General election 1918: Winchester
Party		Candidate	Votes	%
C	Unionist	George Hennessy	10,166	64.6
	Liberal	William J. West	5,569	35.4
Majority			4,597	29.2
Turnout			15,735	48.1
Registered electors			32,747	
	Unionist win (new boundaries)			
C indicates candidate endorsed by the coalition government.

== Election results 1885–1918 ==
=== Elections in the 1910s ===
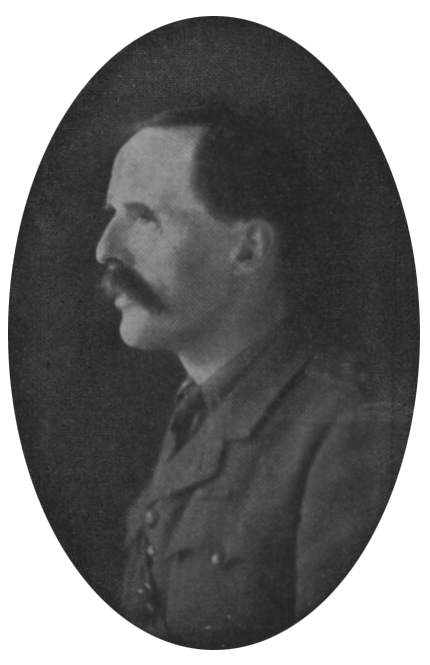
Guy Baring, MP for Winchester from 1906 to 1916

General Election 1914/15:

Another General Election was required to take place before the end of 1915. The political parties had been making preparations for an election to take place and by July 1914, the following candidates had been selected;

- Unionist: Guy Baring
- Liberal:

1916 Winchester by-election
Party	Candidate	Votes	%	±%
Conservative	Douglas Carnegie	1,218	72.0	+11.5
Independent	Henry Charles Woods	473	28.0	New
Majority		745	44.0	+23.0
Turnout		1,691	52.0	−35.3
Conservative hold		Swing	N/A	

General election December 1910: Winchester
Party	Candidate	Votes	%	±%
Conservative	Guy Baring	1,719	60.5	+2.8
Liberal	George William Ricketts	1,121	39.5	−2.8
Majority		598	21.0	+5.6
Turnout		2,840	88.7	−5.0
Conservative hold		Swing		

General election January 1910: Winchester
Party	Candidate	Votes	%	±%
Conservative	Guy Baring	1,729	57.7	+6.7
Liberal	George William Ricketts	1,268	42.3	−6.7
Majority		461	15.4	+13.4
Turnout		2,997	93.7	+6.7
Conservative hold		Swing	+6.7	

=== Elections in the 1900s ===
Charles McCurdy, Liberal candidate in Winchester in the 1906 election

General election 1906: Winchester
Party	Candidate	Votes	%	±%
Conservative	Guy Baring	1,322	51.0	−10.3
Liberal	Charles McCurdy	1,272	49.0	+10.3
Majority		50	2.0	−20.6
Turnout		2,594	87.0	+5.4
Registered electors		2,982		
Conservative hold		Swing	-10.3	

Edward Hemmerde, Liberal candidate in Winchester in the 1900 election

General election 1900: Winchester
Party	Candidate	Votes	%	±%
Conservative	William Myers	1,342	61.3	N/A
Liberal	Edward Hemmerde	846	38.7	New
Majority		496	22.6	N/A
Turnout		2,188	81.6	N/A
Registered electors		2,681		
Conservative hold		Swing	N/A	

=== Elections in the 1890s ===
General election 1895: Winchester
Party	Candidate	Votes	%	±%
Conservative	William Myers	Unopposed		
Conservative hold				

William Myers, MP for Winchester from 1892 to 1900

General election 1892: Winchester
Party	Candidate	Votes	%	±%
Conservative	William Myers	1,213	58.5	−0.3
Liberal	Willie Mathews	859	41.5	+0.3
Majority		354	17.0	−0.6
Turnout		2,072	86.6	+4.8
Registered electors		2,393		
Conservative hold		Swing	-0.3	

=== Elections in the 1880s ===
By-election, 5 Jan 1888: Winchester
Party	Candidate	Votes	%	±%
Conservative	Richard Moss	1,364	61.6	+2.8
Liberal	Philip Vanderbyl	849	38.4	−2.8
Majority		515	23.2	+5.6
Turnout		2,213	90.1	+8.3
Registered electors		2,455		
Conservative hold		Swing	+2.8	

General election 1886: Winchester
Party	Candidate	Votes	%	±%
Conservative	Arthur Loftus Tottenham	1,119	58.8	+4.8
Liberal	Archibald Grove	783	41.2	−4.8
Majority		336	17.6	+9.6
Turnout		1,902	81.8	−10.0
Registered electors		2,326		
Conservative hold		Swing	+4.8	

General election 1885: Winchester
Party	Candidate	Votes	%	±%
Conservative	Arthur Loftus Tottenham	1,153	54.0	−7.8
Liberal	Francis Baring	982	46.0	+7.8
Majority		171	8.0	N/A
Turnout		2,135	91.8	+2.9 (est)
Registered electors		2,326		
Conservative hold		Swing	−7.8	

== Election results 1832–1885 ==
=== Elections in the 1880s ===
General election 1880: Winchester (2 seats)
Party	Candidate	Votes	%	±%
Liberal	Francis Baring	979	38.2	+10.8
Conservative	Richard Moss	808	31.6	−1.5
Conservative	William Barrow Simonds	773	30.2	−9.4
Turnout		1,787 (est)	88.9 (est)	+3.7
Registered electors		2,011		
Majority		171	6.6	N/A
Liberal gain from Conservative		Swing	+5.1	
Conservative hold		Swing	−3.5	

=== Elections in the 1870s ===
General election 1874: Winchester (2 seats)
Party	Candidate	Votes	%	±%
Conservative	William Barrow Simonds	949	39.6	+19.3
Conservative	Arthur Robert Naghten	793	33.1	+12.8
Liberal	John Bonham-Carter	657	27.4	−32.1
Majority		136	5.7	−1.1
Turnout		1,528 (est)	85.2 (est)	−3.6
Registered electors		1,793		
Conservative hold		Swing	+17.7	
Conservative gain from Liberal		Swing	+14.4	

=== Elections in the 1860s ===
General election 1868: Winchester (2 seats)
Party	Candidate	Votes	%	±%
Conservative	William Barrow Simonds	830	40.5	−20.0
Liberal	John Bonham-Carter	690	33.7	+13.9
Liberal	Arthur Jervoise Scott	529	25.8	+6.0
Majority		140	6.8	
Turnout		1,440 (est)	88.8 (est)	+4.6
Registered electors		1,621		
Conservative hold		Swing	−20.0	
Liberal hold		Swing	+12.0	

By-election, 4 June 1866: Winchester
Party	Candidate	Votes	%	±%
Liberal	John Bonham-Carter	361	88.7	+49.2
Conservative	Charles Lempriere	46	11.3	−49.2
Majority		315	77.4	+69.5
Turnout		407	42.3	−41.9
Registered electors		963		
Liberal hold		Swing	+49.2	

Carter was appointed a Lord Commissioner of the Treasury, requiring a by-election.

General election 1865: Winchester (2 seats)
Party	Candidate	Votes	%	±%
Liberal	John Bonham-Carter	459	39.5	−4.4
Conservative	William Barrow Simonds	367	31.6	+1.2
Conservative	Thomas Willis Fleming	336	28.9	+3.1
Majority		92	7.9	+7.3
Turnout		811 (est)	84.2 (est)	+7.8
Registered electors		963		
Liberal hold		Swing	−4.4	
Conservative hold		Swing	+1.7	

By-election, 10 February 1864: Winchester
Party	Candidate	Votes	%	±%
Conservative	Thomas Willis Fleming	Unopposed		
Conservative hold				

East's resignation caused a by-election.

=== Elections in the 1850s ===
General election 1859: Winchester (2 seats)
Party	Candidate	Votes	%	±%
Conservative	James Buller East	402	30.4	+11.8
Liberal	John Bonham-Carter	349	26.4	−12.1
Conservative	Thomas Willis Fleming	341	25.8	+7.2
Liberal	George Shaw-Lefevre	231	17.5	−6.9
Turnout		662 (est)	76.4 (est)	+14.9
Registered electors		866		
Majority		53	4.0	−8.7
Conservative hold		Swing	+10.7	
Majority		8	0.6	−0.8
Liberal hold		Swing	−10.8	

General election 1857: Winchester (2 seats)
Party	Candidate	Votes	%	±%
Whig	John Bonham-Carter	398	38.5	+2.1
Conservative	James Buller East	384	37.1	+0.9
Whig	Sir Wyndham Portal, 1st Baronet	253	24.4	N/A
Turnout		518 (est)	61.5 (est)	−5.0
Registered electors		842		
Majority		14	1.4	+1.2
Whig hold		Swing	+0.6	
Majority		131	12.7	+4.0
Conservative hold		Swing	−0.6	

General election 1852: Winchester (2 seats)
Party	Candidate	Votes	%	±%
Whig	John Bonham-Carter	381	36.4	−3.0
Conservative	James Buller East	379	36.2	+2.0
Independent Liberal	William Whitear Bulpett	288	27.5	New
Turnout		524 (est)	66.5 (est)	−0.8
Registered electors		788		
Majority		2	0.2	−5.0
Whig hold		Swing	−2.0	
Majority		91	8.7	+0.9
Conservative hold		Swing	+1.8	

=== Elections in the 1840s ===
General election 1847: Winchester (2 seats)
Party	Candidate	Votes	%	±%
Whig	John Bonham-Carter	363	39.4	+2.6
Conservative	James Buller East	315	34.2	+1.2
Radical	Bickham Escott	243	26.4	−3.7
Turnout		461 (est)	67.3 (est)	−18.2
Registered electors		684		
Majority		48	5.2	N/A
Whig gain from Conservative		Swing	+2.2	
Majority		72	7.8	−2.6
Conservative hold		Swing	+1.5	

General election 1841: Winchester (2 seats)
Party	Candidate	Votes	%	±%
Conservative	James Buller East	320	33.0	−3.0
Conservative	Bickham Escott	292	30.1	−0.1
Whig	Richard Crowder	191	19.7	+2.8
Whig	Francis Pigott	166	17.1	+0.2
Majority		101	10.4	+8.2
Turnout		485	85.5	+7.2
Registered electors		567		
Conservative hold		Swing	−2.3	
Conservative gain from Whig		Swing	−0.8	

=== Elections in the 1830s ===
General election 1837: Winchester (2 seats)
Party	Candidate	Votes	%	±%
Conservative	James Buller East	258	36.0	+13.1
Whig	Paulet St John-Mildmay	242	33.8	−20.2
Conservative	Bickham Escott	216	30.2	+7.3
Turnout		458	78.3	−0.9
Registered electors		585		
Majority		16	2.2	−11.9
Conservative hold		Swing	+11.6	
Majority		26	3.6	−6.0
Whig hold		Swing	−20.3	

General election 1835: Winchester (2 seats)
Party	Candidate	Votes	%	±%
Conservative	James Buller East	254	45.9	+26.2
Whig	Bingham Baring	176	31.8	−2.6
Whig	Paulet St John-Mildmay	123	22.2	−23.7
Turnout		408	79.2	−1.8
Registered electors		531		
Majority		78	14.1	N/A
Conservative gain from Whig		Swing	+26.3	
Majority		52	9.6	−5.1
Whig hold		Swing	−7.9	

General election 1832: Winchester (2 seats)
Party	Candidate	Votes	%	±%
Whig	Paulet St John-Mildmay	351	45.9	−2.7
Whig	Bingham Baring	263	34.4	+10.5
Tory	James Buller East	151	19.7	−7.8
Majority		112	14.7	−6.4
Turnout		430	81.0	c. +22.1
Registered electors		531		
Whig hold		Swing	+0.6	
Whig gain from Tory		Swing	+7.2	

== Elections before 1832 ==
=== Elections in the 1830s ===
General election 1831: Winchester (2 seats)
Party	Candidate	Votes	%
Whig	Paulet St John-Mildmay	69	48.6
Tory	James Buller East	39	27.5
Whig	Bingham Baring	34	23.9
Turnout		76	c. 58.9
Registered electors		c. 129	
Majority		30	21.1
Whig hold			
Majority		5	3.6
Tory hold			

General election 1830: Winchester (2 seats)
Party	Candidate	Votes	%
Whig	Paulet St John-Mildmay	Unopposed	
Tory	Edward East	Unopposed	
Registered electors		c. 129	
Whig hold			
Tory hold			

== See also ==
- Parliamentary constituencies in Hampshire
- Parliamentary constituencies in South East England
