= Simon Harcourt =

Simon Harcourt may refer to:

- Simon Harcourt (died 1577), MP for Staffordshire (UK Parliament constituency)
- Simon Harcourt, 1st Viscount Harcourt (c.1661–1727)
- Simon Harcourt, 1st Earl Harcourt (1714–1777)
- Simon Harcourt (1684–1720), British politician, MP for Abingdon
- Simon Harcourt (1653–1724), British politician, MP for Aylesbury
- Simon Harcourt (soldier) (1603–1642), Anglo-Irish soldier of fortune
