= Aristocracy (class) =

Upper social class

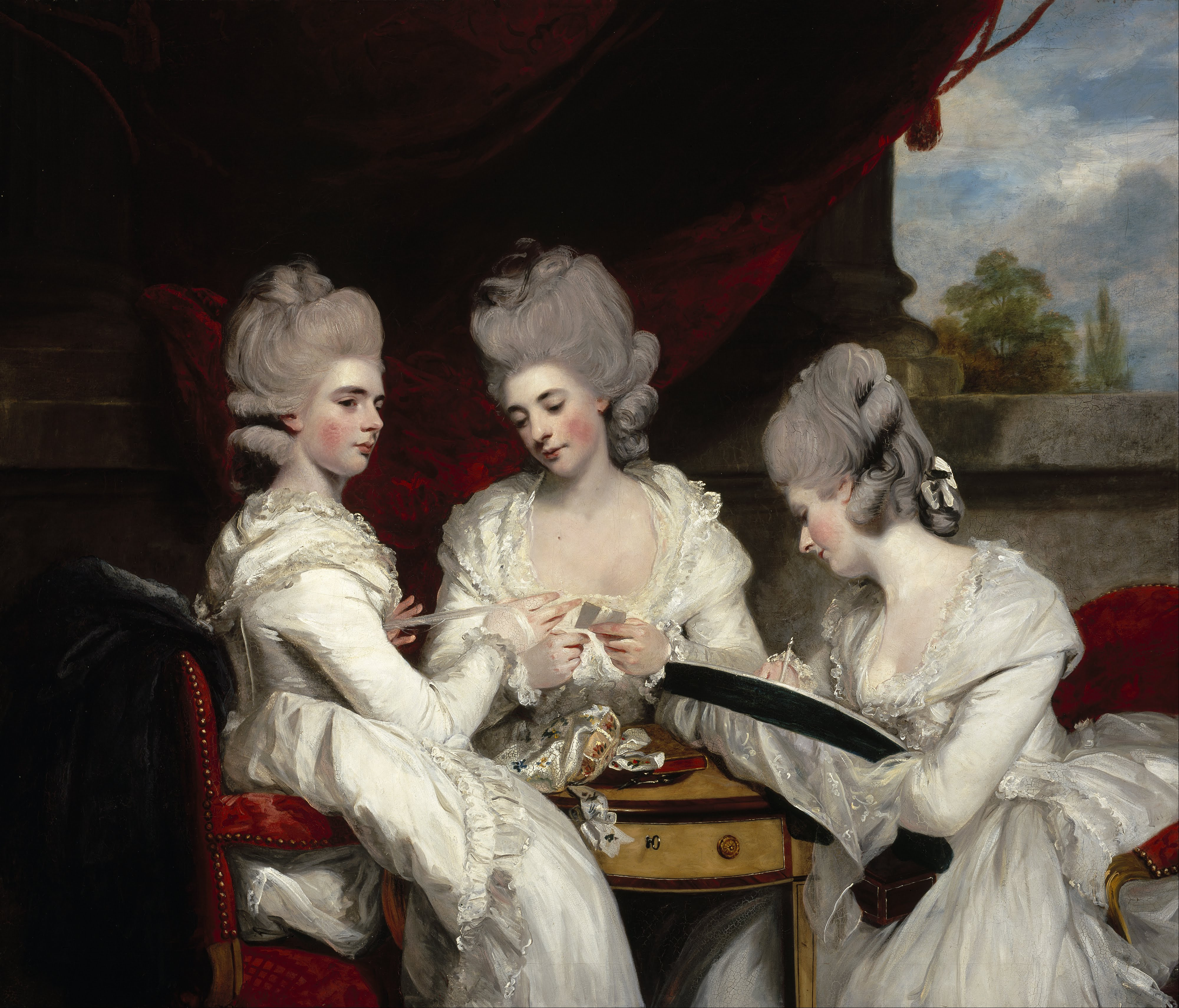
The Ladies Waldegrave, a portrait of three English aristocrats from the Waldegrave family by Joshua Reynolds

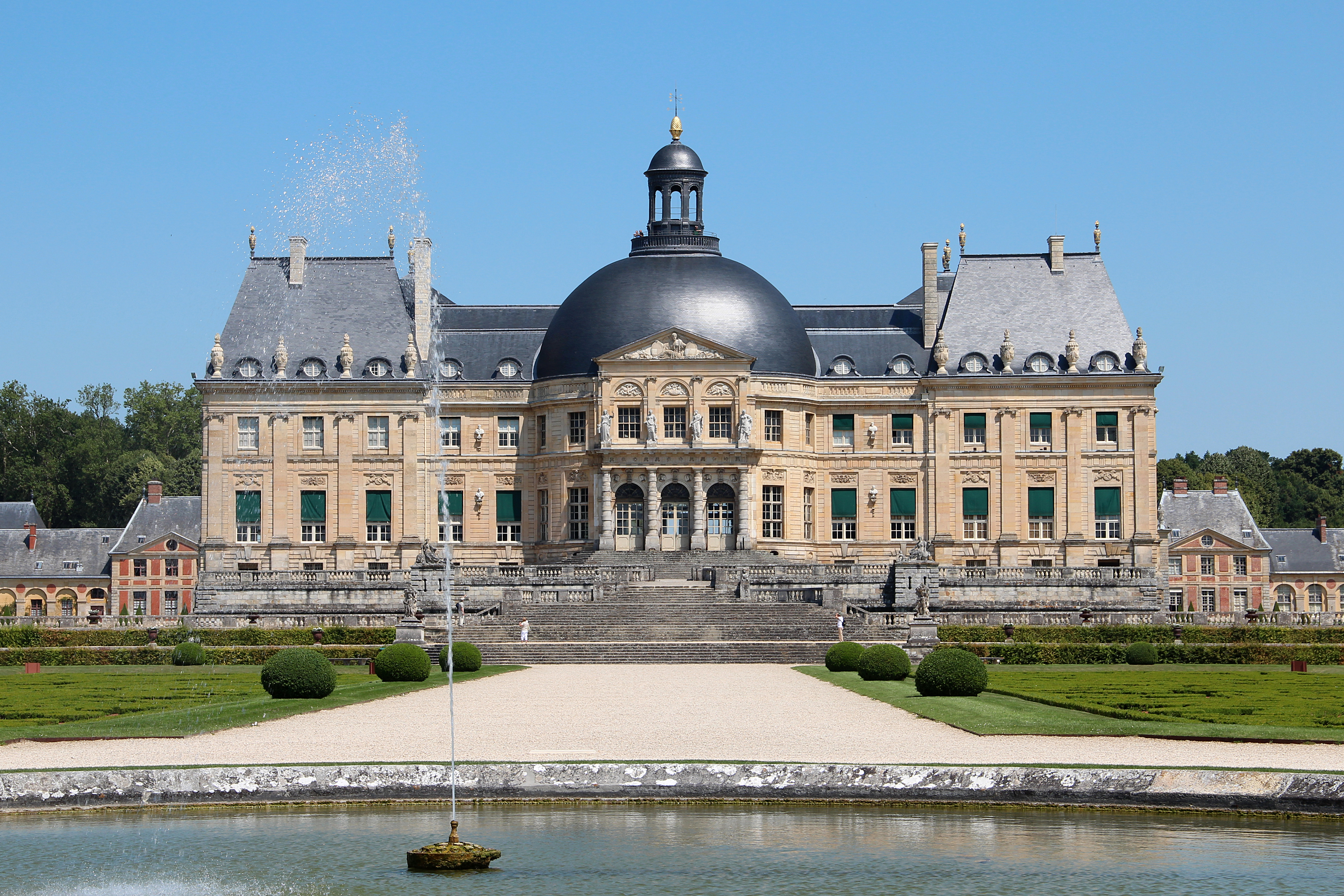
A château, the primary form of residence for the French aristocracy

The aristocracy is historically associated with a "hereditary" or a "ruling" social class. In many states, the aristocracy included the upper class of people (aristocrats) with hereditary rank and titles. In some, such as ancient Greece, ancient Rome, or India, aristocratic status came from belonging to a military class. It has also been common, notably in African and Oriental societies, for aristocrats to belong to priestly dynasties. Aristocratic status can involve feudal or legal privileges. They are usually below only the monarch of a country or nation in its social hierarchy. In modern European societies, the aristocracy has often coincided with the nobility, a specific class that arose in the Middle Ages, but the term "aristocracy" is sometimes also applied to other elites, and is used as a more general term when describing earlier and non-European societies. Aristocracy may be abolished within a country as the result of a revolution against them, such as the French Revolution.

== Etymology ==
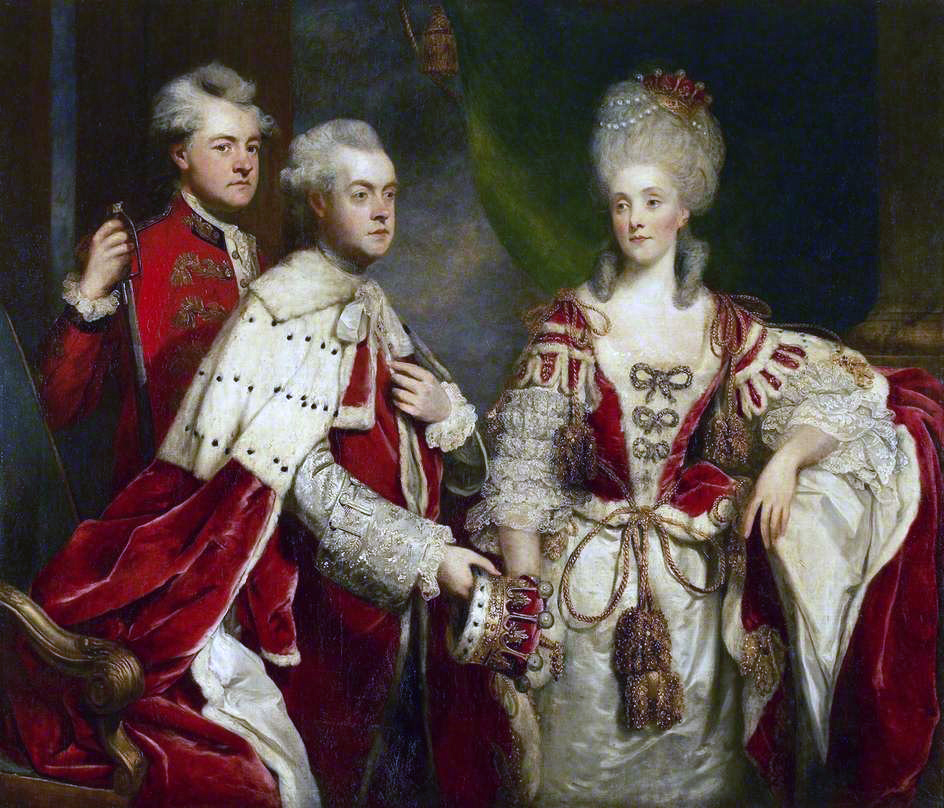
2nd Earl and Countess Harcourt, in their coronet and coronation robes by Joshua Reynolds. The countess was a confidant of Queen Charlotte.

The term aristocracy derives from the Greek ἀριστοκρατία (aristokratia from ἄριστος (aristos) 'excellent' and κράτος (kratos) 'power'). In most cases, aristocratic titles were and are hereditary.

The term aristokratia was first used in Athens with reference to young citizens (the men of the ruling class) who led armies at the front line. Aristokratia roughly translates to "rule of the best born". Due to martial bravery being highly regarded as a virtue in ancient Greece, it was assumed that the armies were being led by "the best". This virtue was called arete (ἀρετή). Etymologically, as the word developed, it also produced a more political term: aristoi (ἄριστοι). The term aristocracy is a compound word stemming from the singular of aristoi, aristos (ἄριστος), and the Greek word for power, kratos (κράτος).

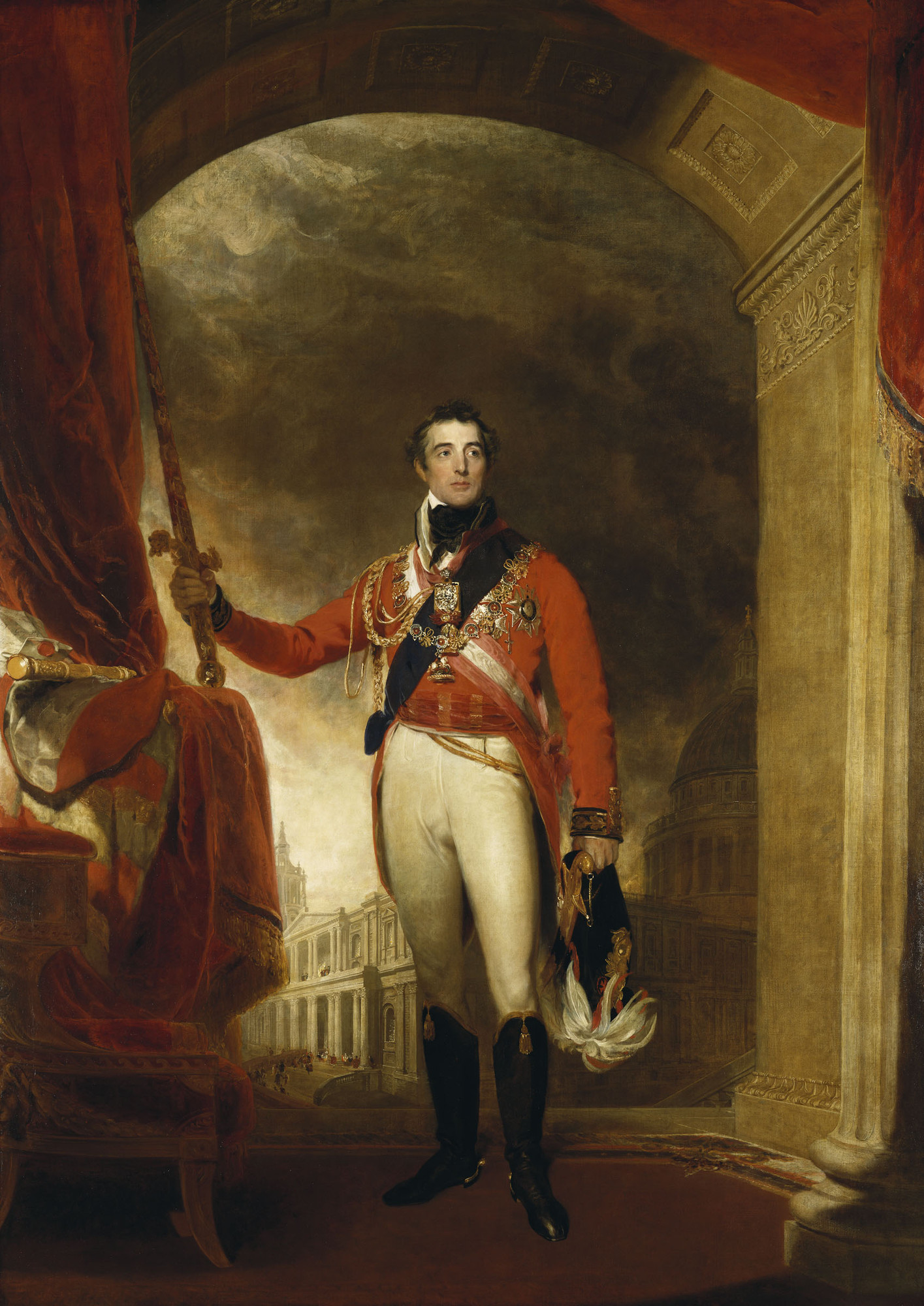
Hon. Arthur Wellesley later made Duke of Wellington after defeating Napoleon.

From the ancient Greeks, the term passed to the European Middle Ages for a similar hereditary class of military leaders, often referred to as the nobility. As in Greece, this was a class of privileged men and women whose familial connections to the regional armies allowed them to present themselves as the most "noble" or "best" of society.

== See also ==
- Gentry
  - Landed gentry (United Kingdom)
  - Landed gentry in China
  - Landed gentry in Poland
- Honorifics
- Nobility
  - List of fictional nobility
- Upper class
- Imtiaz (Egypt)
- Chieftaincy (Nigeria)
- Old money
- Peerage (United Kingdom)
- Royal and noble ranks
- Styles (manner of address)
  - Royal and noble styles
  - Forms of address in the United Kingdom
- Titles
  - Hereditary title
  - Honorary titles
  - False titles of nobility
- Social capital
- Symbolic capital
- Honour
- Yangban (Korea)
- Kuge (Japan)
- Samanta, Thakur, Zamindar and Jenmi (India)
