= William Harcourt, 2nd Viscount Harcourt =

The Right Honourable The Viscount Harcourt KCMG OBE DL

Personal details
- Born: William Edward Harcourt; 5 October 1908 London, England
- Died: 3 January 1979 (aged 70) Chelsea, London, England
- Spouses: Hon. Maud Elizabeth Grosvenor (m. 1931; div. 1942) Elizabeth Sonia Gibbs (m. 1946; died 1959)
- Relations: Doris Harcourt (sister); William Harcourt (grandfather)
- Children: 3
- Parent(s): Lewis Harcourt, 1st Viscount Harcourt; Mary Ethel Burn
- Education: Eton College
- Alma mater: Christ Church, Oxford
- Employer: Morgan, Grenfell & Co.

William Edward Harcourt, 2nd Viscount Harcourt KCMG OBE DL (5 October 1908 – 3 January 1979) was an English aristocrat and businessman. Harcourt was a member of the distinguished Harcourt family, who descended from the ancient House of Harcourt in Normandy.

== Early life ==
Harcourt was born in London, the fourth and final child but only son born to Lewis Harcourt (1863–1922) and Mary Ethel Burns (1874–1961), an American heiress who in 1918 was appointed a Dame Commander of the Order of the British Empire. Doris Harcourt, a socialite and member of the Bright Young Things, was his eldest sister.

He was a grandson of Sir William Harcourt (1827–1904), the Chancellor of the Exchequer. He was christened 9 November at St Mary Undercroft at the House of Commons. He was named after King Edward VII, his godfather, who stood sponsor by proxy. His mother was a niece of banker J. Pierpont Morgan and a first cousin of J.P. Morgan Jr.

The noble titles Earl Harcourt, Viscount Harcourt and Baron Harcourt had previously been in the family until the male line of that branch failed in 1830. In 1917, the title of Viscount Harcourt was revived in favour of his father, along with the subsidiary title of Baron Nuneham. He was educated at Eton College and was still a schoolboy there when he inherited the viscountcy in 1922. He then attended Christ Church, Oxford.

== Career ==
After Oxford, Harcourt spent most of his life in London. In 1931, he served as managing director of Morgan, Grenfell & Co. and was later chairman, 1968–73. He was also chairman of the Legal and General Assurance Society from 1958 to 1977.

Domestically, he served on several committees, including the Radcliffe Committee on Monetary and Credit Policy, 1957–59 and the Plowden Committee on Overseas Representational Services, 1962–64. Internationally, Harcourt served as head of the British Treasury delegation at the British embassy in Washington, D.C. in 1954–57, and as executive director of the International Monetary Fund and of the International Bank for Reconstruction and Development.

Harcourt was heavily involved with the Museum of London. From 1965 to his death, he was chairman of the governors of the museum. Since 1958, he was chairman of the Oxford Preservation Trust and from 1975 on, he was chairman of the Trustees of the Rhodes House.

=== Military and honours ===
During the Second World War, Harcourt served with the Queen's Own Oxfordshire Hussars, the 63rd (Oxford Yeomanry) Anti-Tank Regiment Royal Artillery.

He was appointed a Member of the Order of the British Empire (MBE), Military Division, in February 1943. He was appointed to an Officer in the same order (OBE) in the 1945 Birthday Honours.

In 1952, he was appointed a Deputy Lieutenant for Oxfordshire, and from 1963 to his death, he was served as Vice-Lieutenant of Oxfordshire.

While living in Washington, D.C., Harcourt was knighted in the 1957 New Year Honours as a Knight Commander of the Order of St Michael and St George.

== Personal life ==
Harcourt was twice married; firstly, he was married in 1931 to Hon. Maud Elizabeth Grosvenor (1909-2000), a daughter of Francis Egerton Grosvenor, 4th Baron Ebury and Mary Adela (née Glasson). They had three daughters before the marriage was dissolved in 1942:

- Hon. Elizabeth Ann Harcourt (1932–2020), who married Crispin Gascoigne, son of Maj.-Gen. Sir Julian Alvery Gascoigne.
- Hon. Penelope Mary Harcourt (1933–2023), who married Maj. Anthony David Motion, son of Maj. Malcolm Davie Motion.
- Hon. Virginia Vernon Harcourt (b. 1937), who married Julian Francis Wells, son of Dr. Arthur Quinton Wells, former High Sheriff of Oxfordshire.

In 1946, Harcourt married Elizabeth Sonia Gibbs, daughter of Sir Harold Snagge and widow of Capt. Lionel Gibbs. She died in 1959.

He died in Chelsea, London, aged 70, at which point the Harcourt Viscountcy again became extinct. The manor house and the remainder of the estate of Stanton Harcourt passed to his eldest daughter Elizabeth.

Peerage of the United Kingdom
Preceded by Lewis Harcourt	Viscount Harcourt; 1922–1979	Extinct
