= Viscount Harcourt =

Extinct viscountcy in the peerage of the United Kingdom

Viscountcy of Harcourt
- Gules two bars or
- Creation date: 24 July 1721 (first creation); 23 January 1917 (second creation)
- Creation: Second
- Created by: King George V
- Peerage: Peerage of Great Britain (first creation); Peerage of the United Kingdom (second creation)
- First holder: Lewis Harcourt, 1st Viscount Harcourt
- Last holder: William Harcourt, 2nd Viscount Harcourt
- Remainder to: Heirs male of the first viscount's body lawfully begotten
- Subsidiary titles: Baron Harcourt; Baron Nuneham (second creation)
- Status: Extinct
- Extinction date: 17 June 1830 (first creation); 3 January 1979 (second creation)
- Former seats: Nuneham House; Stanton Harcourt; Cokethorpe House
- Motto: Le bon temps viendra ("The good times will come"); Gesta Verbis Prævenient ("Deeds before Words")

Viscount Harcourt, of Stanton Harcourt in the County of Oxford, was a title created twice for members of the Harcourt family, once in the Peerage of Great Britain and once in the Peerage of the United Kingdom.

It was first created in the Peerage of Great Britain for Lord Chancellor Simon Harcourt, who was created Baron Harcourt in 1711, Viscount Harcourt in 1721, and Earl Harcourt and Viscount Nuneham in 1749. For more information on these titles, which all became extinct in 1830, see Earl Harcourt.

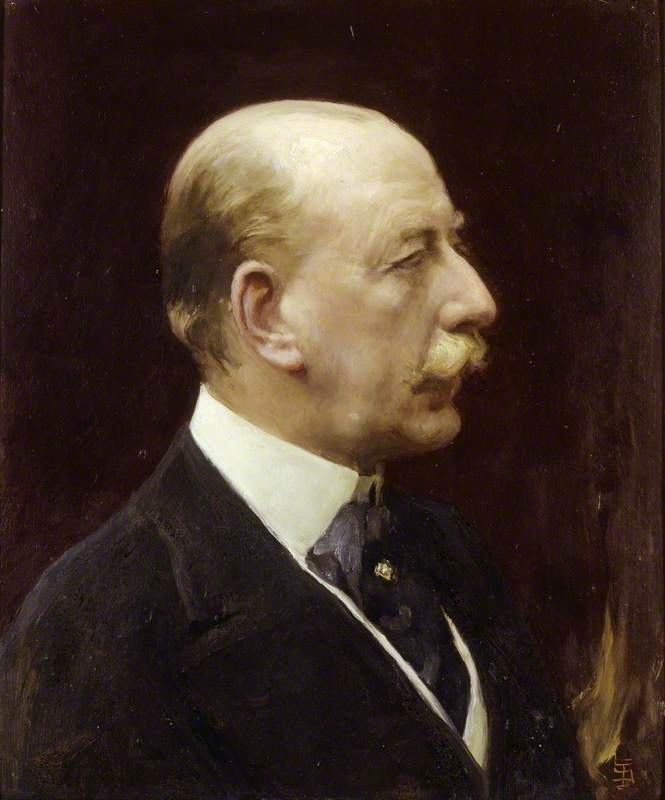
1st Viscount Harcourt, of the second creation

The viscountcy was revived in 1917 in favour of Lewis Vernon Harcourt, also created Baron Nuneham, of Nuneham Courtenay in the County of Oxford, in the Peerage of the United Kingdom. Harcourt was the son of Sir William Vernon Harcourt, son of William Vernon Harcourt, son of the Honourable and Right Reverend Edward Venables-Vernon-Harcourt, son of George Venables-Vernon, 1st Baron Vernon, by his third wife, Martha Harcourt, daughter of Simon Harcourt, son of Simon Harcourt, 1st Viscount Harcourt.

After the death of the first viscount in 1922, the second viscount succeeded his father while still a student at Eton College. He married twice but left no sons; the title became extinct upon his own death in 1979.

== Viscount Harcourt, first creation (1721) ==
- See Earl Harcourt

== Viscount Harcourt, second creation (1917) ==
- Lewis Vernon Harcourt, 1st Viscount Harcourt (1863–1922)
- William Edward Harcourt, 2nd Viscount Harcourt (1908–1979)

== See also ==
- Earl Harcourt
- Baron Vernon
