= Earl Harcourt =

Title in the Peerage of Great Britain

Earldom of Harcourt
- Gules, two bars and a chief indented or
- Creation date: 1 December 1749
- Created by: George II
- Peerage: Peerage of Great Britain
- First holder: Simon Harcourt, 2nd Viscount Harcourt
- Last holder: William Harcourt, 3rd Earl Harcourt
- Subsidiary titles: Viscount Nuneham; Viscount Harcourt; Baron Harcourt of Stanton Harcourt
- Extinction date: 17 June 1830
- Former seats: Nuneham House; Stanton Harcourt; Cokethorpe House
- Motto: Gesta Verbis Prævenient ("Deeds before Words")

Earl Harcourt, of Stanton Harcourt in the County of Oxford, was a title in the Peerage of Great Britain. It was created in 1749 for Simon Harcourt, 2nd Viscount Harcourt. He was made Viscount Nuneham at the same time, also in the Peerage of Great Britain. Harcourt was the son of the Honourable Simon Harcourt and the grandson of Simon Harcourt, Lord High Chancellor of Great Britain, who had been created Baron Harcourt, of Stanton Harcourt in the County of Oxford, on 3 September 1711, and Viscount Harcourt, of Stanton Harcourt in the County of Oxford, on 24 July 1721. Both these titles were also in the Peerage of Great Britain.

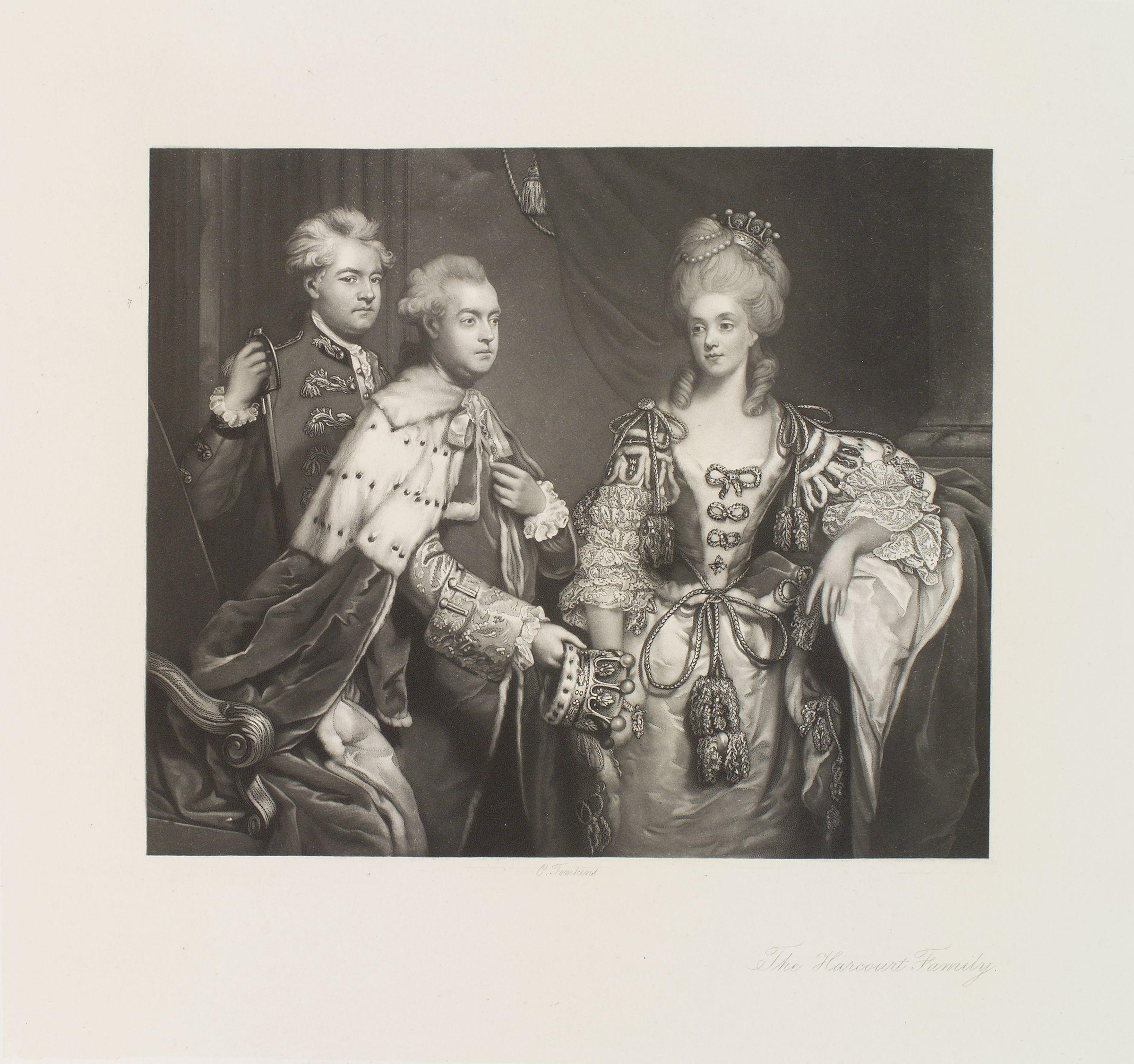
William Harcourt, 3rd Earl Harcourt; George Harcourt, 2nd Earl Harcourt; and Elizabeth (Vernon), Countess of Harcourt, by Sir Joshua Reynolds

The first earl fulfilled various diplomatic duties for King George II and George III as Prince of Wales and then King. He represented the King at the initial wedding ceremony with Charlotte of Mecklenburg-Strelitz in 1761. He served as Ambassador to France from 1768. In 1772, Harcourt was appointed Viceroy of Ireland. Five years later, he died at his own estate at Nuneham by falling into a well. He was succeeded by his eldest son, George, who was in turn succeeded by his younger brother, William. The titles became extinct on the latter's death in 1830 as neither brother left legitimate surviving sons of their own.

The viscountcy was revived in 1917 in favour of Lewis Vernon Harcourt. He was a descendant of the Right Reverend Edward Venables-Vernon-Harcourt, the son of George Venables-Vernon, 1st Baron Vernon, by his third wife Martha Harcourt, daughter of the aforementioned Simon Harcourt, son of Simon Harcourt, 1st Viscount Harcourt. See Viscount Harcourt for further history of this branch of the family.

The ancient family of Harcourt held Stanton Harcourt, Oxfordshire from the 12th century and other later Oxfordshire seats included Cokethorpe House and Nuneham House. In addition, they held estates in Staffordshire at Ellenhall Hall, Ranton Abbey and Abbey House.

== Barons Harcourt (1711) ==
- Simon Harcourt, 1st Baron Harcourt (1661–1727) (created Viscount Harcourt in 1721)

== Viscounts Harcourt (1721) ==
- Simon Harcourt, 1st Viscount Harcourt (1661–1727)
  - Hon. Simon Harcourt (1684–1720)
- Simon Harcourt, 2nd Viscount Harcourt (1714–1777) (created Earl Harcourt in 1749)

== Earls Harcourt (1749) ==
- Simon Harcourt, 1st Earl Harcourt (1714–1777)
- George Simon Harcourt, 2nd Earl Harcourt (1736–1809)
- William Harcourt, 3rd Earl Harcourt (1743–1830)

== See also ==
- Viscount Harcourt
