= Cogges Manor Farm =

Former farm in Oxfordshire, England

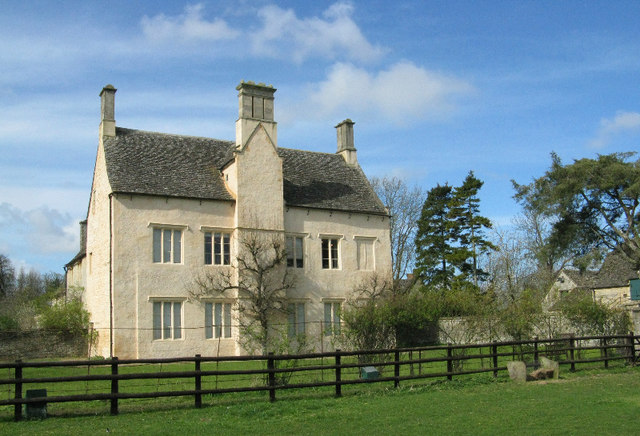
- Cogges Manor Farm – the House
- Established: 1974
- Location: Cogges
- Coordinates: 51.78417°N 1.47795°W
- Type: heritage centre
- Website: www.cogges.org.uk

Cogges Manor Farm is a one-time working farm in Cogges near Witney in Oxfordshire, England, now a heritage centre operated by a charitable trust and open to the public.

== Overview ==
The aim of Cogges Manor Farm is to give visitors an insight into farm life, and how the food they eat is husbanded or cultivated. Additionally it provides workshops for school children and adults about food production, local history, horticulture and rural arts and crafts. The grounds and the medieval barns are used for traditional festivals, theatrical performances and private functions.

It also serves the community as a recreational facility where families can meet and feed the animals, enjoy the ambience of the farmyard, the orchard and a traditional walled vegetable garden, and wander around the woodland site of a disused moat on the banks of the Windrush.

Though located close to the centre of Witney, the Farm is surrounded by common land and pasture, thus retaining a rural character.

Though not geographically in the Cotswolds the buildings of the Farm and the older parts of Witney have many of the characteristics of a Cotswold settlement. It lies within the boundary of the ancient Royal Hunting Forest of Wychwood.

== History ==
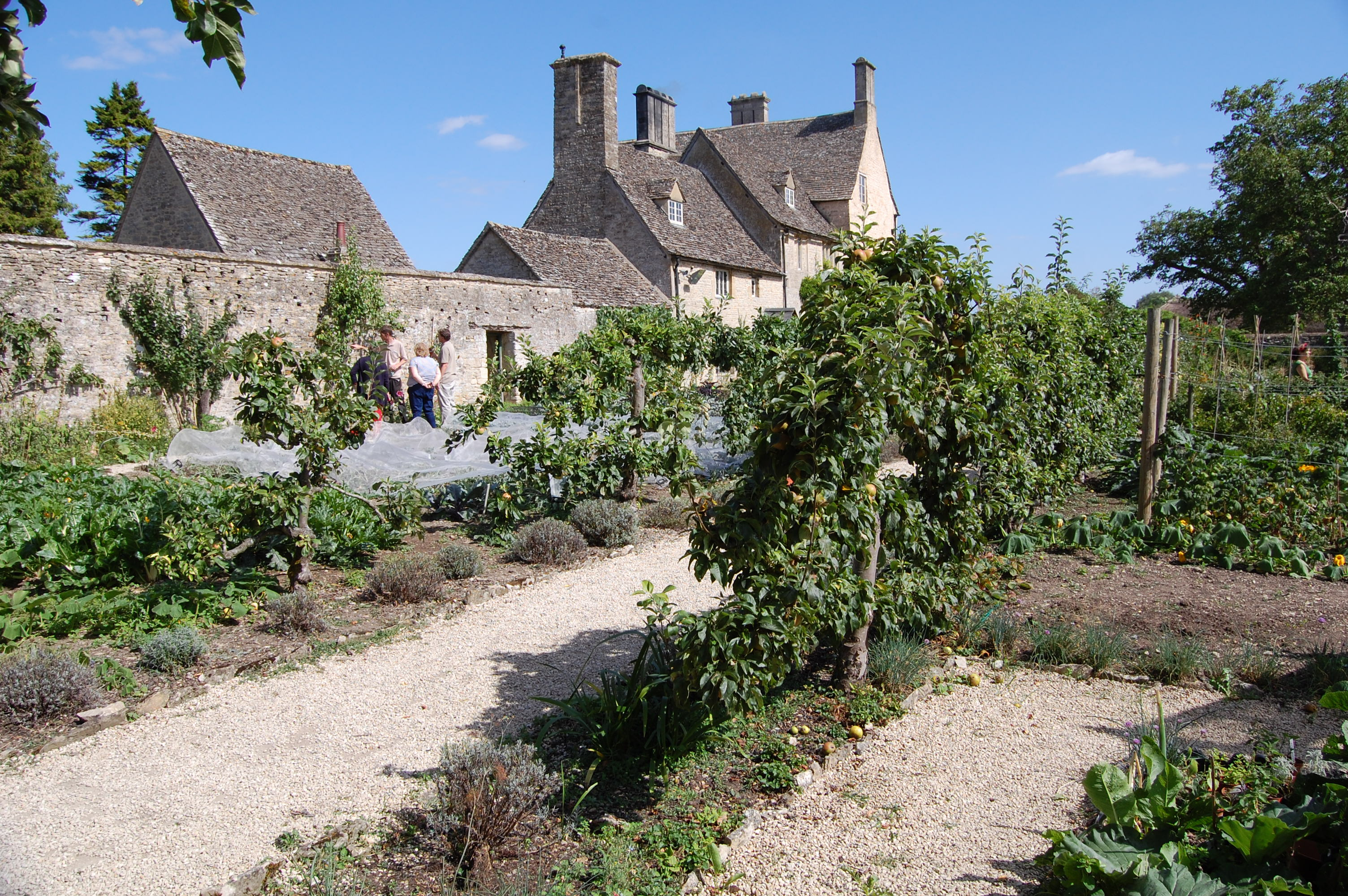
The walled garden is a key attraction. It has been restored, and subsequently maintained, entirely by voluntary effort.

The original manor house was a Cotswold stone building dating from the middle of the 13th century. It originally comprised four ranges built around a courtyard. Of these the 13th century kitchen and part of the hall survive from one range and the dairy incorporates remains of one of the other ranges. The other two ranges have been lost, but traces or foundations of both of them survive. In the 13th century the Manor had a large fishpond, but since 1984 part of the site of the pond has been covered by modern houses.

The manor house was probably built after Walter de Grey, Archbishop of York bought part of the manor of Cogges in AD 1241. In 1242 the house was described as the Archbishop's Court. By 1245 the Archbishop had given Cogges Manor to his nephew Sir Robert de Grey, with whose heirs the house remained until 1485. More than once in its history the family used the house as a dower house for the widows of successive Barons Grey of Rotherfield.

During the 16th century, the manor passed through various owners. One of them altered the mediaeval hall by inserting a first floor and adding a new, higher roof. The Blake family bought the manor in 1667 and added the current second wing to the house. In 1726, Daniel Blake sold Cogges Manor Farm to Simon Harcourt, 1st Viscount Harcourt. The Harcourt family leased out Cogges Manor Farm until 1919, when the then tenants, the Mawle family, bought the freehold. In 1974 Oxfordshire County Council bought Cogges Manor Farm and converted the house and farmstead into a museum.

== Museum ==
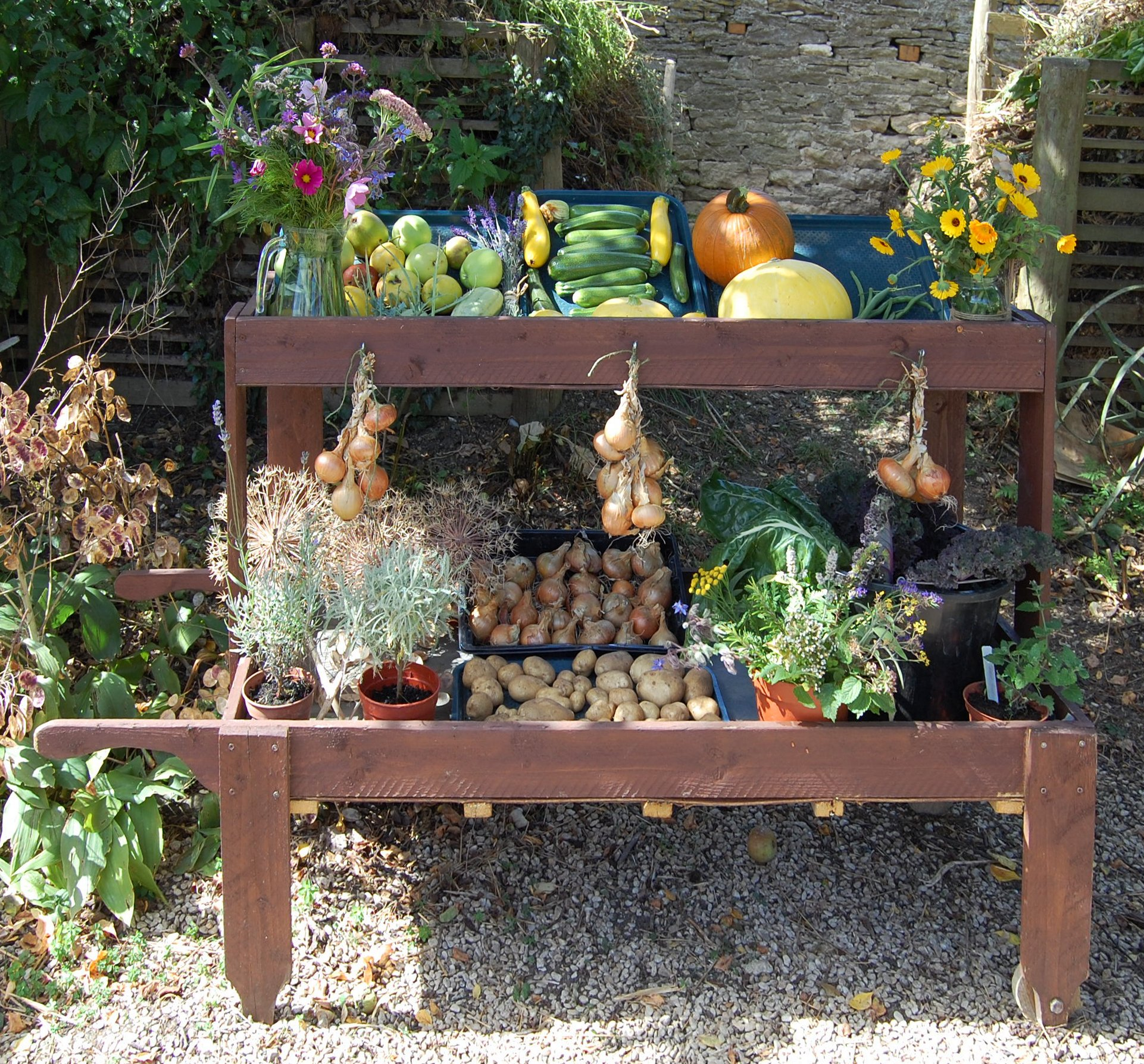
Cogges Manor Farm – display of vegetables grown by volunteers

Cogges Manor Farm then operated as a living museum depicting rural life in Oxfordshire during the Victorian era, subsidised by Oxfordshire County Council. At the end of the summer season on 31 August 2009 the council withdrew funding and the museum closed. At the time it was reported that a new charitable trust intended to reopen the museum in April 2010.

== Since the 2011 re-opening ==
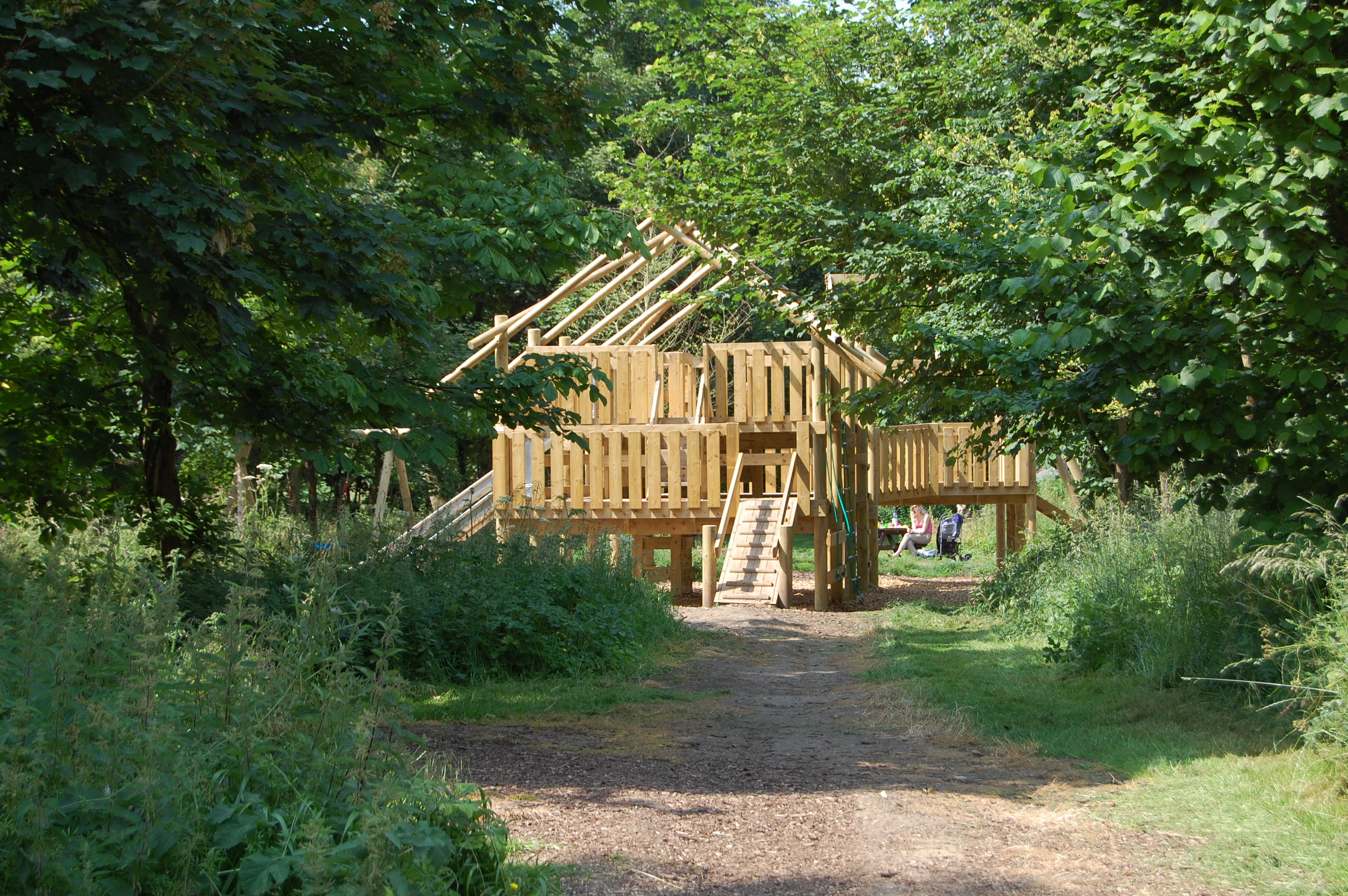
Cogges Manor Farm – the way to the woodland play space

In July 2011, Cogges Manor Farm re-opened, now operated by a charitable trust, the site and buildings being leased from Oxfordshire County Council at a 'peppercorn rent' that is in practice a basket of apples. It is no longer a Museum in the conventional sense. Instead it is being developed as a place where families and individuals can relax, learn, and contribute voluntarily to its operation with the aim of giving visitors a better understanding of food and its production, both historically and today.

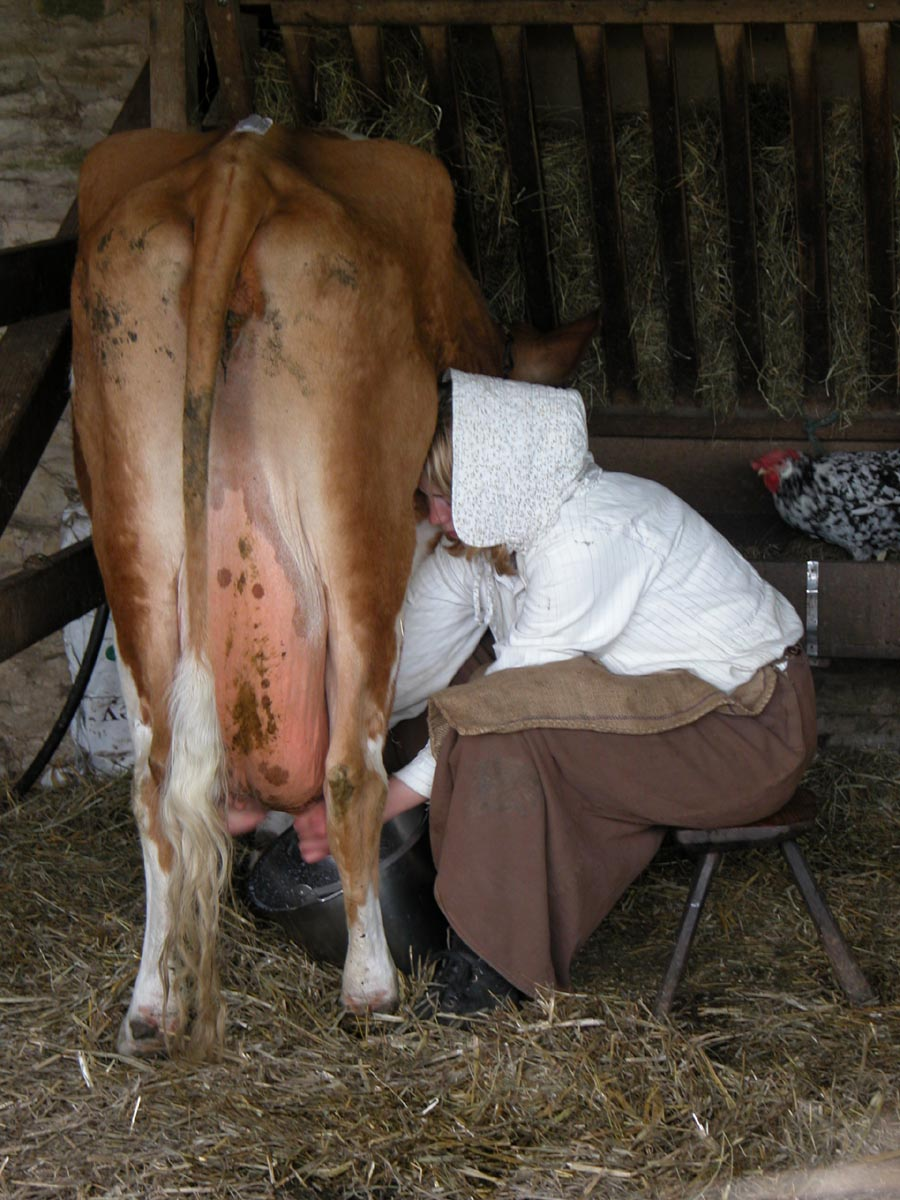
Hand milking a cow in traditional costume

The Farm has been changed from a museum to an educational and recreational heritage site. Small farmyard animals such as chickens, ducks, pigs and goats are husbanded using traditional methods and vegetables are grown for food in a classical 'walled garden'. The transition has been accomplished chiefly by the efforts of volunteers under the direction of a minimal management team.

The concept is that through volunteering and training opportunities, courses and workshops, school learning activities and by seeing the work first-hand, visitors and volunteers are able to appreciate the ups and downs of small scale farming.

Displays and activities, coupled with conducted tours, explain how the Cogges Manor Farm site has developed since Saxon times, how its past residents made a living and how the farm has continually evolved in response to changing fortunes and opportunities. The hitherto neglected and overgrown medieval moated area, after being sensitively cleared by volunteers, provides play opportunities and family trails that connect with this theme.

The intention is to develop the venue into a self-funding prime visitor attraction, hosting events such as food markets and a beer festival to supplement admission fees.

With support from local businesses the surfaces of the open yards and the interiors of the two barns have been improved while retaining their essential period atmosphere. The site has been used successfully for theatre productions, both in the open air on the lawns and in the barns. The barns have become popular locations for wedding receptions. Such special events promise to yield an income stream that will enable the Trust to become sustainable.

UK Prime Minister and local MP David Cameron visited the attraction in January 2011 prior to the re-opening and described the Trust's plans as "enterprising". He visited again on 13 September 2013, when he congratulated the Trust on its successful operation to date. He returned again in July 2015 as part of celebrations of the 800th anniversary of the signing of Magna Carta.

Cogges Manor Farm also doubles up as the fictional Yew Tree Farm in the hit TV series Downton Abbey.

== Sources ==
- Bowen, Jane (1993). Cogges Manor Farm Museum. Alan Sutton Publishing Ltd for Oxfordshire County Council. ISBN 0-9520840-0-7.
- Bowen, Jane; Pope, Clare (2004). Cogges Manor Farm Museum. Sutton Publishing Ltd for West Oxfordshire District Council. ISBN 0-7509-3912-5.
- Crossley, Alan & C.R. Elrington (eds.); A.P. Baggs; W.J. Blair; Eleanor Chance; Christina Colvin; Janet Cooper; C.J. Day; Nesta Selwyn; S.C. Townley (1990). Victoria County History: A History of the County of Oxford, Volume 12: Wootton Hundred (South) including Woodstock. pp. 54–61.
- Sherwood, Jennifer; Pevsner, Nikolaus (1974). The Buildings of England: Oxfordshire. Harmondsworth: Penguin. p. 551. ISBN 0-14-071045-0.
- Steane, John M., ed. (1984). Cogges A guide to the museum and village. (sic). Cogges Agricultural Heritage Museum Association Limited. ISBN 0-901036-06-4.
