= Simon Harcourt, 1st Earl Harcourt =

British Army officer, courtier and diplomat (1714–1777)

General The Right Honourable The Earl Harcourt PC FRS
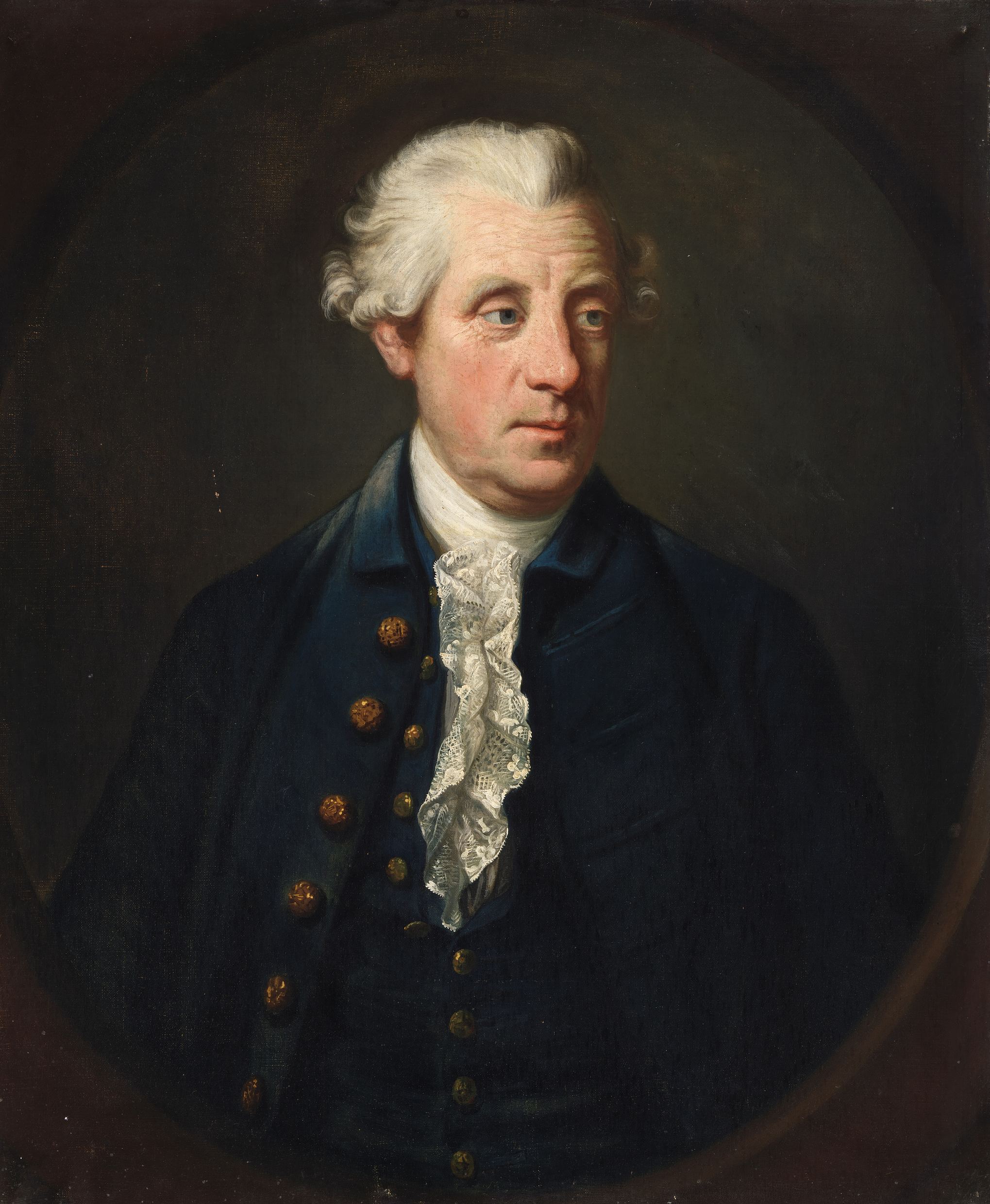
- Portrait by Robert Hunter

Lord Lieutenant of Ireland
- In office 29 October 1772 – 7 December 1776
- Monarch: George III
- Preceded by: The Viscount Townshend
- Succeeded by: The Earl of Buckinghamshire

Personal details
- Born: 1714 Stanton Harcourt, Oxfordshire, England
- Died: 16 September 1777 (aged 63) Nuneham Park, Oxfordshire
- Children: 4, including George and William

General Simon Harcourt, 1st Earl Harcourt, PC, FRS (1714 – 16 September 1777), known as Viscount Harcourt between 1727 and 1749, was a British Army officer, courtier and diplomat who served as the Lord Lieutenant of Ireland from 1772 to 1776.

== Biography ==
Harcourt was born in Oxfordshire, the son of Hon. Simon Harcourt, M.P. for Wallingford and Abingdon, and Elizabeth Evelyn, sister of Sir John Evelyn, 1st Baronet. His father died in 1720, when Simon was still a small child. He was educated at Westminster School and in 1727 succeeded his grandfather Simon Harcourt, 1st Viscount Harcourt as 2nd Viscount Harcourt. In 1745, having raised a British Army regiment for service during the Jacobite rising of 1745, the 76th Foot (Lord Harcourts Regiment), he received a commission as a colonel in the Army. The regiment was disbanded on 10 June 1746.

In 1749, he was created Earl Harcourt of Stanton Harcourt. He was appointed governor to the prince of Wales, afterward George III, in 1751; and after the accession of the latter to the throne, in 1761, he was appointed as special ambassador to Mecklenburg-Strelitz, to negotiate a marriage between King George and Charlotte of Mecklenburg-Strelitz (Princess Charlotte), whom he conducted to England.

He held a number of appointments at court and in the diplomatic service. He was the British ambassador to Paris from 1768 to 1772. He was promoted to the rank of general in 1772; and in October of the same year he succeeded Lord Townshend as Lord Lieutenant of Ireland, an office which he held until 1777. His proposal to impose a tax of 10% on the rents of absentee landlords had to be abandoned owing to opposition in England; but he succeeded in conciliating the leaders of Opposition in Ireland, and he persuaded Henry Flood to accept office in the government. Resigning in January 1777, he retired to Nuneham Park. He died there shortly afterwards by accidentally drowning in a well while trying to rescue his favourite dog, which had fallen into the well while the pair had been out for a walk. He succeeded in rescuing the dog despite losing his life; several hours after going missing, Harcourt was found head first down the well with only his lower legs and feet visible above the water and the dog sitting on his feet.

== Personal life ==
He married, on 16 October 1735, Rebecca Samborne Le Bass (died 16 January 1765), daughter and heiress of Charles Samborne Le Bass, of Pipewell Abbey, Northamptonshire. They had two sons and two daughters:

- George Simon Harcourt, 2nd Earl Harcourt (1 August 1736 – 20 April 1809), married on 26 September 1765 his first cousin the Hon. Elizabeth Venables-Vernon (21 January 1746 – 25 January 1826), daughter of George Venables-Vernon, 1st Baron Vernon and Martha Harcourt, without issue.
- Lady Elizabeth Harcourt (18 June 1739 – 21 January 1811), married on 20 June 1763 Sir William Lee, 4th Baronet, of Hartwell (12 September 1726 – 6 July 1799)
- Hon. Anne Harcourt (June 1741 – August 1746)
- William Harcourt, 3rd Earl Harcourt (20 March 1743 – 17 June 1830), upon whose death without male issue the family titles became extinct.

Political offices
| New office | Master of the Horse to Queen Charlotte; 1761 – 1763 | Succeeded by The Viscount Weymouth |
| Preceded by The Earl of Northumberland | Lord Chamberlain to Queen Charlotte; 1763 – 1768 | Succeeded by The Earl De La Warr |
| Preceded by The Viscount Townshend | Lord Lieutenant of Ireland; 1772 – 1776 | Succeeded by The Earl of Buckinghamshire |
Diplomatic posts
| Preceded by The Earl of Rochford | British Ambassador to France; 1768 – 1772 | Succeeded by The Viscount Stormont |
Peerage of Great Britain
| New creation | Earl Harcourt; 1749 – 1777 | Succeeded by George Simon Harcourt |
| Preceded by Simon Harcourt | Viscount Harcourt; 1727 – 1777 | Succeeded by George Simon Harcourt |
