= George Harcourt, 2nd Earl Harcourt =

British politician and gardener

The Right Honourable The Earl Harcourt
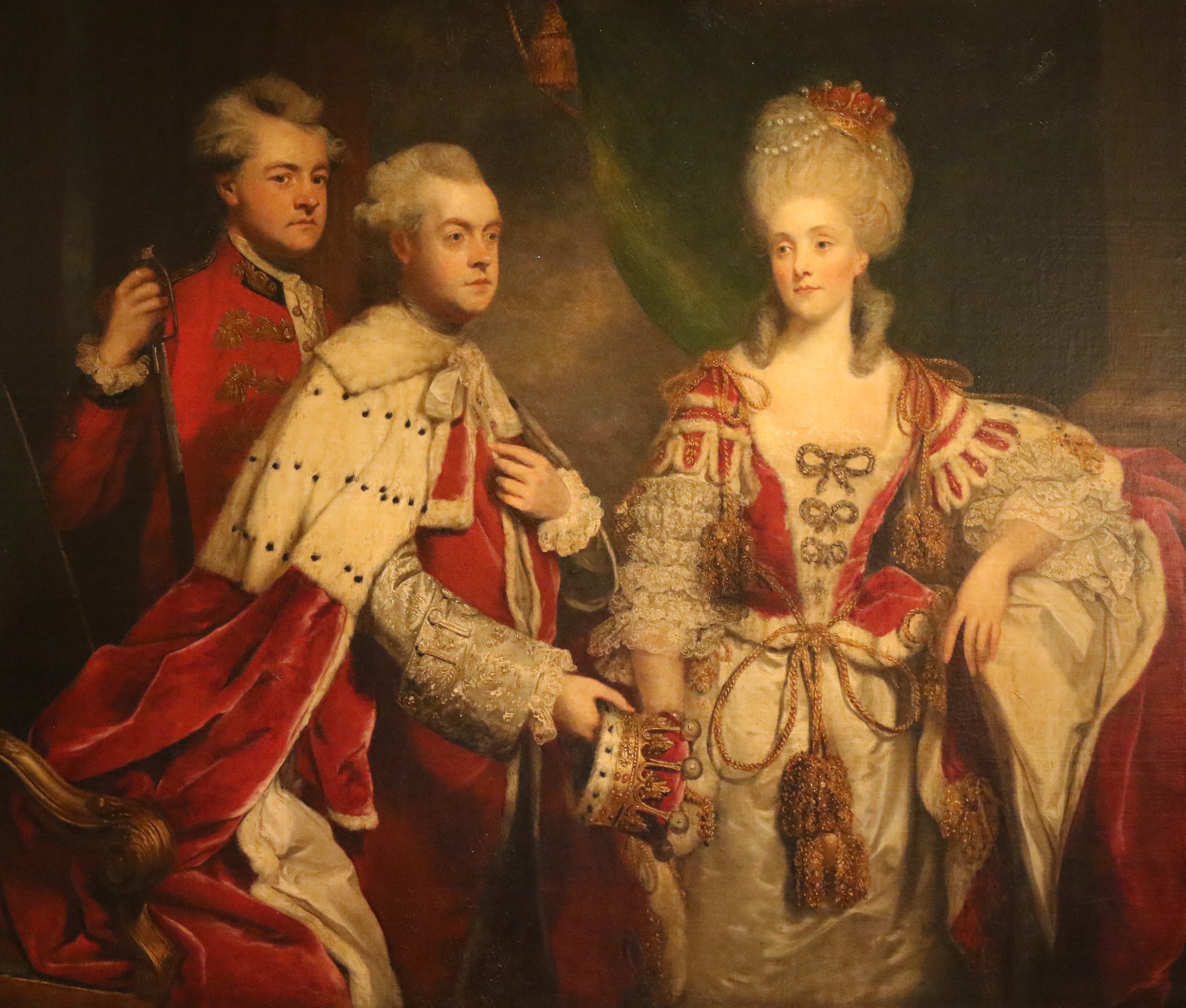
- Portrait of George, with his wife Elizabeth and brother William, by Joshua Reynolds, 1780

Member of Parliament for St Albans
- In office 1761–1768 Serving with James West
- Preceded by: Hon. James Grimston; James West
- Succeeded by: Richard Sutton; John Radcliffe

Personal details
- Born: George Simon Harcourt; 1 August 1736
- Died: 20 April 1809 (aged 72)
- Spouse: Elizabeth Venables-Vernon (after 1765)
- Parent(s): Simon Harcourt, 1st Earl Harcourt; Rebecca Le Baas
- Education: Westminster School

George Simon Harcourt, 2nd Earl Harcourt (1 August 1736 – 20 April 1809), styled Viscount Nuneham until inheriting the title of Earl Harcourt in 1777, was a British politician and gardener.

== Early life ==
Harcourt was the eldest son of Simon Harcourt, 1st Earl Harcourt and his wife, Rebecca Le Baas. His younger brother was William Harcourt

His paternal grandparents were the former Elizabeth Evelyn (sister of Sir John Evelyn, 1st Baronet) and the Hon. Simon Harcourt, MP for Wallingford and Abingdon. Upon his grandfather's death in 1720, his father became heir apparent of his grandfather, Simon Harcourt, 1st Viscount Harcourt, whom his father succeeded as 2nd Viscount Harcourt in 1727.

He spent two years at Westminster School, and had art lessons from Alexander Cozens and other masters.

== Career ==
In 1754, Harcourt travelled in Germany and Italy with George Bussy Villiers, and William Whitehead as tutor to Villiers. His Grand Tour continued to 1756. Whitehead later wrote poems about both men's families' estates, Middleton Park and Nuneham Courtenay.

Harcourt was elected to parliament for St Albans in 1761, remaining a member until 1767. He was not recorded as having spoken in the House. He was a supporter of John Wilkes, a friend of Catherine Macaulay, and an opponent of the war against the American colonies. He entered the House of Lords in 1777 after his father's accidental death at their estate at Nuneham House, where he drowned in a well trying to rescue his dog.

In 1772, Harcourt began to redesign the gardens at Nuneham Courtenay, assisted by William Mason, moving on to the park in 1777. From 1779 Capability Brown was brought in to advise on the park and gardens; and Paul Sandby, perhaps a contact made through Whitehead, on the interior of the house. As a patron Harcourt employed Thomas Pitt on a monument to his father, and set up a poetry prize on the Ancient Britons, won by George Richards.

In 1784, he acquired the remainder of the Cogges manor estate from the heirs of Viscount Wenman, to clear the latter's debts.

In 1790, Harcourt was appointed Master of the Horse to Queen Charlotte, a post he held until his death.

== Personal life ==
Harcourt married his first cousin Elizabeth, daughter of George Venables-Vernon, 1st Baron Vernon and Martha Harcourt in 1765.

Lord Harcourt died on 20 April 1809. He was succeeded by his brother William. Upon William's death on 17 June 1830, the earldom and viscountcy became extinct.

Parliament of Great Britain
Preceded by Hon. James Grimston; James West	Member of Parliament for St Albans; 1761 – 1768; With: James West	Succeeded by Richard Sutton; John Radcliffe
Peerage of Great Britain
Preceded by Simon Harcourt	Earl Harcourt; 1777 – 1809	Succeeded by William Harcourt
