= James Jennings (MP) =

English landowner and Tory politician

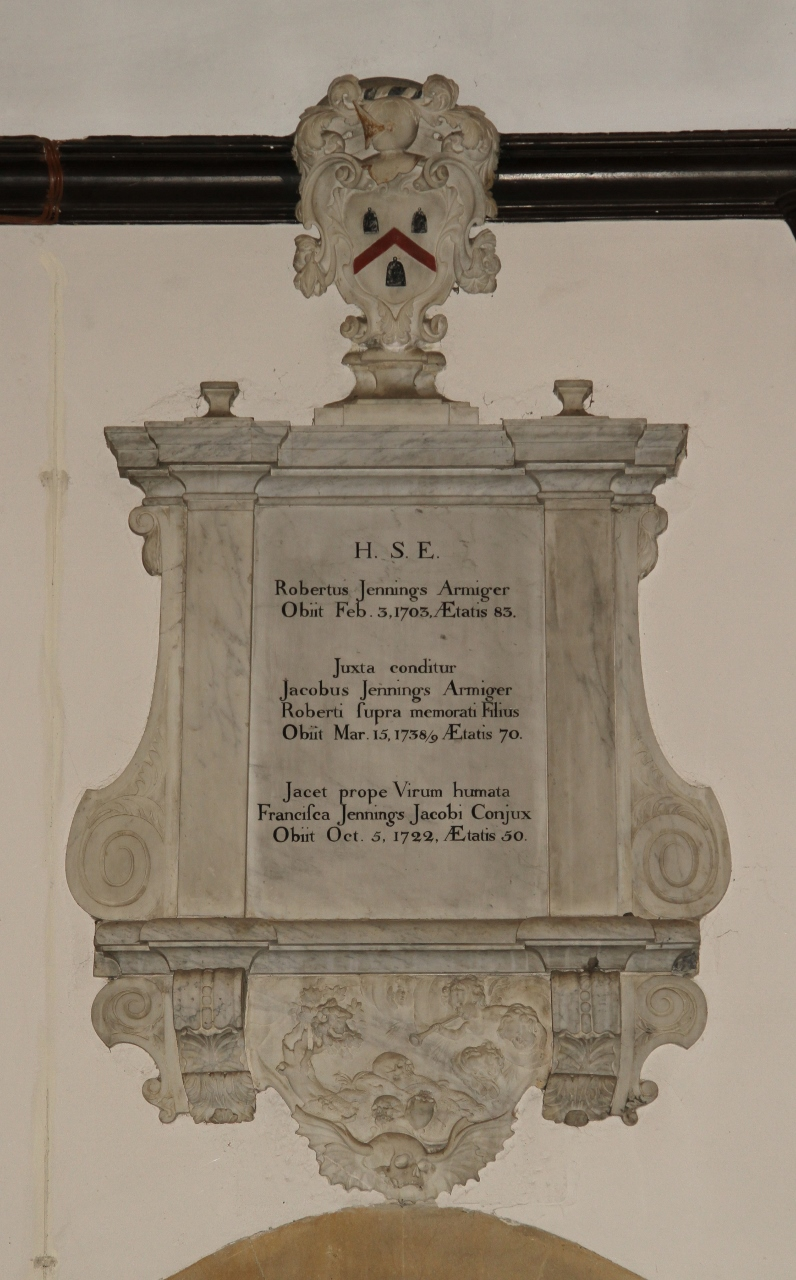
- Memorial to Robert and James Jennings in Shiplake Church
- Born: baptised 26 June 1670; Shiplake
- Died: 9 March 1739 (aged 68)

James Jennings (1670–1739) of Shiplake was an English landowner and Tory politician who sat in the House of Commons between 1710 and 1722.

Jennings was baptised on 26 June 1670, the eldest son of Robert Jennings, of Shiplake and his wife Mary Jennens daughter of James Jennens of Long Wittenham, Berkshire. His father, Robert was headmaster of John Roysse's Free School in Abingdon (now Abingdon School) from 1657 to 1683 where James was educated. He matriculated at Wadham College, Oxford on 5 July 1686, aged 16; He married Frances Constantine, daughter of Harry Constantine of Merley and Lake, Dorset, in 1698. In 1704, he succeeded his father to the Shiplake estate.

Jennings substituted for his father as High Sheriff of Oxfordshire in the year 1694 to 1695. He was returned as Member of Parliament for Abingdon at a by-election on 13 December 1710. He associated with the Tories being one of the ‘Worthy patriots’. In 1713 he voted against the French commerce bill. He died not stand at the 1713 general election.

Jennings was elected Tory MP for Abingdon again at the 1715 general election and voted consistently against the Government. He was defeated at the 1722 general election when he split the Tory vote in a one-seat constituency. He stood again in 1734 and was again unsuccessful.

Jennings died on 9 March 1739. He had six sons but his eldest son Henry and two others did not survive him. He had four daughters of whom two survived and were left £4,000 each.

Parliament of England
Preceded by Sir Simon Harcourt I	Member of Parliament for Abingdon; 1710–1713	Succeeded by Hon. Simon Harcourt II
Parliament of Great Britain
Preceded by Hon. Simon Harcourt II	Member of Parliament for Abingdon; 1715–1722	Succeeded by Robert Hucks

== See also ==
- List of Old Abingdonians
