= George Parker, 2nd Earl of Macclesfield =

British politician and astronomer (1697–1764)

The Right Honourable The Earl of Macclesfield FRS
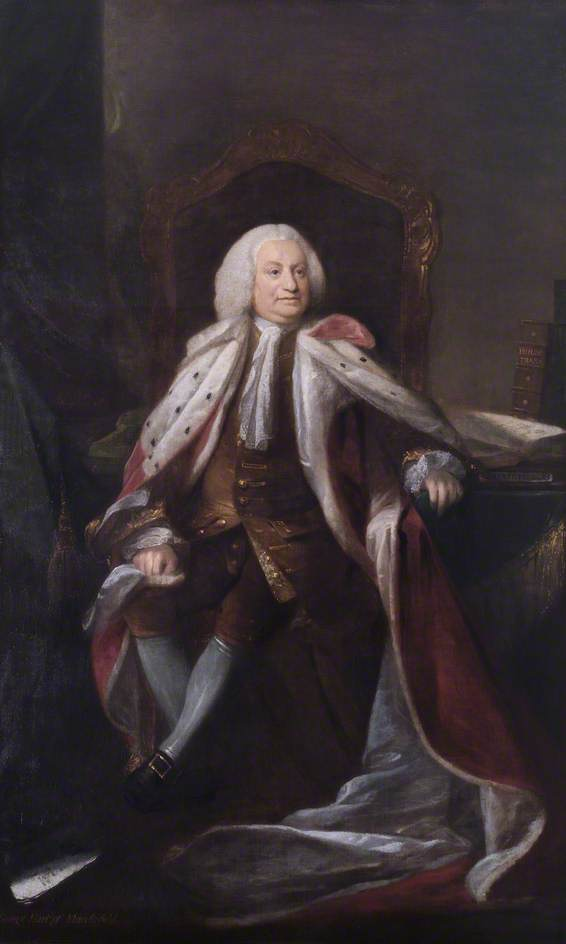
- Portrait by Benjamin Wilson

15th President of the Royal Society
- In office 1752–1764
- Preceded by: Martin Folkes
- Succeeded by: James Douglas

Teller of the Exchequer
- In office 1719–1763
- Preceded by: The Lord Torrington
- Succeeded by: George Grenville

Personal details
- Died: 17 March 1764
- Children: 2

Macclesfield's coat of arms: Gules, a chevron between three leopard's faces or

George Parker, 2nd Earl of Macclesfield, FRS (c. 1697 – 17 March 1764) was a British politician and astronomer.

== Biography ==
George was tutored by Welsh mathematician William Jones, who went on to become the first person to use the symbol π (the Greek letter Pi) to represent the ratio of the circumference of a circle to its diameter.

Styled Viscount Parker from 1721 to 1732, he was Member of Parliament (MP) for Wallingford from 1722 to 1727, but his interests were not in politics. In 1722, he became a fellow of the Royal Society, and he spent most of his time in astronomical observations at his Oxfordshire seat, Shirburn Castle, which had been bought by his father in 1716; here he built an observatory and a chemical laboratory.

He was very prominent in making the case in Parliament for the Calendar (New Style) Act 1750, with which the Kingdom of Great Britain and the British Empire changed from the Julian calendar to the Gregorian calendar in 1752.

When his son ran for parliament as a Whig in 1754, his role in the calendar reform was one of many issues raised by the son's Tory opponents; one of Hogarth's satirical series of paintings about these elections (1755) is the only source for the subsequent "Give us our eleven days" myth.

From 1752 until his death, Macclesfield was president of the Royal Society, and he made some observations on the great 1755 Lisbon earthquake.

In 1750, Macclesfield was offered the honorary position of vice president of the Foundling Hospital, which he accepted and kept until his death in 1764. The Foundling Hospital was a charitable institution created a decade earlier, dedicated to saving London's abandoned children. The Earl seems to have taken his position seriously, as he commissioned the artist Benjamin Wilson to paint a full-size portrait of him, which he then donated to the hospital. The portrait is still in the Foundling Hospital Collection and available to view at the Foundling Museum.

In 1755, Parker was elected a foreign member of the Royal Swedish Academy of Sciences. He also was a corresponding member of the Académie des sciences.

== Family ==
George Parker was born in about 1697 to Thomas Parker, 1st Earl of Macclesfield and his wife Janet née Carrier. George Parker married twice. Firstly, on 18 September 1722 to Mary Lane daughter of Ralph Lane, Turkey merchant, of Woodbury; with issue:

- Thomas Parker, 3rd Earl of Macclesfield
- Hon. George Lane Parker

Secondly, on 20 December 1757 at St James Westminster, to Dorothy Nesbitt, with no known issue

== See also ==
- Shirburn Castle
- List of presidents of the Royal Society

Parliament of Great Britain
Preceded by William Hucks; Henry Grey	Member of Parliament for Wallingford; 1722–1727; With: William Hucks	Succeeded by William Hucks; George Lewen
Political offices
Preceded by The Lord Torrington	Teller of the Exchequer; 1719–1763	Succeeded by George Grenville
Peerage of Great Britain
Preceded by Thomas Parker	Earl of Macclesfield; 1732–1764	Succeeded by Thomas Parker
Professional and academic associations
Preceded by Martin Folkes	15th President of the Royal Society; 1752–1764	Succeeded by James Douglas
