= 76th Regiment of Foot (1745) =

- Active: 1745–1746
- Country: Kingdom of Great Britain
- Branch: British Army
- Type: Infantry
- Engagements: Jacobite rising of 1745

Commanders
- Colonel of the Regiment: Simon Harcourt, 1st Earl Harcourt

The 76th Regiment of Foot, or Harcourt's Regiment, was a regiment in the British Army from 1745 to 1746.

== History ==
In response to the Jacobite rising of 1745, the regiment was raised in Oxfordshire by Simon Harcourt, 1st Earl Harcourt. It received the rank of 76th and Harcourt was commissioned as its colonel.

Formed at Thame, the 76th Foot was declared "half-complete" on 13 November and soon considered ready to march. The ten companies were dispersed : one at Henley-on-Thames, one at Wellington, one at Bicester, two at Thame, one at Banbury, one company and headquarters at Woodstock, one company at Burford and two at Witney.

From December, the Regiment was used to relieve Regular units in city or coastal duties. On 6 December, the Regiment was ordered to move to Berkshire : one company replaced the Foot Guards serving at Windsor Castle, five went to the town of Windsor, two to Colnbrook, one to Chertsey, one to Egham and one to Staines-upon-Thames. The Regiment dispatched men for short durations to various places in Southern England.

As of 11 January, the Regiment mustered 675 NCOs and privates for an authorized strength of 780. At the end of the month, it was relocated to Salisbury. On 6 June, the Regiment received orders to march to Thame. It was disbanded there on 17 June.

== Uniform ==
While most of the regiments raised by noblemen in 1745 had blue coats and red facings, a surviving grenadier cap indicates that Harcourt's Regiment had red coats with bright yellow facings.
