= Cogges =

Place in Oxfordshire, England

Coordinates: 51.784°N 1.478°W

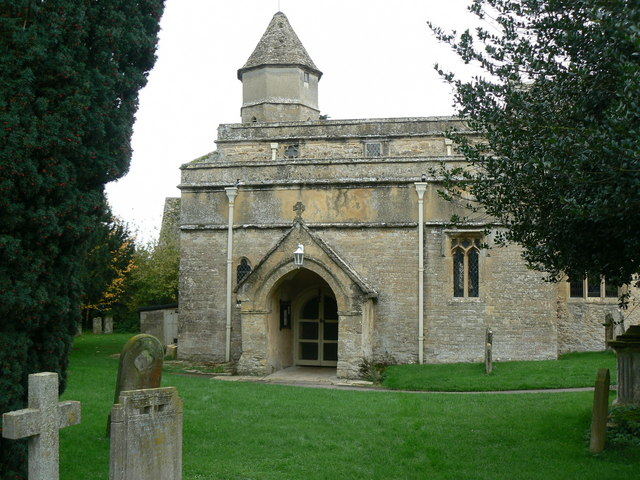

- Location within Oxfordshire
- OS grid reference: SP3609
- Civil parish: Witney
- District: West Oxfordshire
- Shire county: Oxfordshire
- Region: South East
- Country: England
- Sovereign state: United Kingdom
- Post town: Witney
- Postcode district: OX28
- Dialling code: 01993
- Police: Thames Valley
- Fire: Oxfordshire
- Ambulance: South Central
- UK Parliament: Witney

Cogges is an area beside the River Windrush in Witney, in the West Oxfordshire district, in Oxfordshire, England, 0.5 miles (800 m) east of the town centre. It had been a separate village and until 1932 it was a separate civil parish.

== History ==
The former village centres upon three historic buildings: the Church of England parish church of Saint Mary, the former Vicarage and Cogges Manor Farm. There was also formerly an 11th-century fortified manor house. Two moats survive south of the parish church. One was called Castle Yard, and excavation within the curtilage of the other has revealed massive 12th-century foundations.

Cogges manor is mentioned in the Domesday Book of 1086, and was for many years held by the De Grey family. It passed through inheritance to Francis Lovell, 1st Viscount Lovell, who was attainted in 1485, and the manor seized by the Crown. King Henry VII gave the manor first to his uncle Jasper Tudor, Duke of Bedford, and then in 1514 to the Duke of Norfolk. In 1543, it passed to Sir Thomas Pope, founder of Trinity College, Oxford. After the Civil War, the estate was granted to Sir Francis Henry Lee of Ditchley, who sold it to the Blake family. William Blake founded Blake's School in Cogges. In 1726, Viscount Harcourt acquired the manor from the heirs of Sir Francis Blake. In 1784, his grandson George, Earl Harcourt acquired the remainder of the Cogges estate from the heirs of Viscount Wenman, to clear the latter's debts.

In 1931 the parish had a population of 835. On 1 April 1932 the parish was abolished and merged with Witney.

=== Parish church ===
St. Mary's parish church had been established by the second half of the 11th century. The walls of the nave are Romanesque and may be either late Saxon or early Norman. The south aisle was added late in the 12th century, but the two arches of the arcade between the nave and south aisle were rebuilt in the 13th century. The chancel and chancel arch were enlarged and rebuilt in the middle of the 13th century. In about 1340 the north chapel was added, linked with the chancel by an arcade of two bays and with the 14th century effigy of a lady under one of the arches. The Decorated Gothic north aisle and adjoining bell tower were built in about 1350.

The present east window of the chancel is also Decorated Gothic. The tower's upper stages are octagonal, possibly in reference to a style of church towers in Normandy whence the monks from Fécamp would have originated. In the 15th century a Perpendicular Gothic clerestory was added to the nave, and the roofs of the nave, aisles and chancel were all rebuilt in the shallow-pitched late-medieval manner. Late in the 15th century the Perpendicular Gothic west window of the nave was inserted. The windows of the north chapel were decorated with stained glass depicting the heraldry of the de Grey family. During the English Civil War in the 17th century the church was damaged and the heraldic glass was destroyed.

=== Cogges Priory ===
A priory of the Benedictine Fécamp Abbey was founded at Cogges by Manasses Arsic in 1103. The priory became closely associated with the running of the parish church. In 1441 Henry VI seized the priory and its estates and gave them to Eton College, which thus acquired control of the parish church as well. The priory fell into disrepair but the remains of a 13th-century building have survived in an altered form, with an intermediate floor inserted to make it a two-storey building. Early in the 17th century a wing was added to the surviving building to make it into a farmhouse. In 1859 Eton College sold the priory house to the Diocese of Oxford to become St. Mary's Vicarage. A high, gabled Victorian wing was added to enlarge the house, so that the 13th century core is now sandwiched between 17th and 19th century additions.

The Domesday Book records that by 1086 Cogges had a water mill, presumably on the River Windrush. For much of its history Cogges had two water mills: one at the southern tip of the parish and the other north of the Priory. The southern mill was originally called Gold Mill, and its name evolved by 1279 to Gill Mill. By 1670 Gill Mill was being used as a fulling mill and in 1702 and 1712 there were two fulling mills on the site. The last known record of Gill Mill being in operation is from about 1803. The northern mill existed by 1272 and was being used as a fulling mill by 1387. It was still in operation in 1702 but had fallen out of use by 1704.

=== Manor Farm ===
Cogges Manor Farm House is a 16th- and 17th-century house built around the remains of one wing of a manor house that originated in the middle of the 13th century. The remains of the 13th-century building were altered in the 16th century and a second wing was added after 1667. In 1974 Oxfordshire County Council bought the house and converted it into a museum, now the heritage centre Cogges Manor Farm. An open field system of farming prevailed in the parish until 1787 when an Act of Parliament enabled the common land to be enclosed. Cogges was a separate civil parish until 1932, when the former village became part of Witney and the remaining rural parts were divided between the civil parishes of Ducklington and South Leigh.

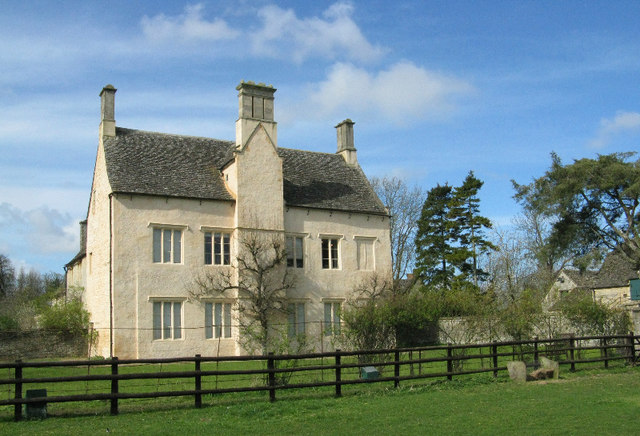
Cogges Manor Farm House

== Sources and further reading ==
- Blair, J; Steane, John M. (1982). "Investigations at Cogges, Oxfordshire 1978–81: The Priory and the Parish Church". Oxoniensia. XLVII. Oxfordshire Architectural and Historical Society: 37–126.
- Crossley, Alan; Elrington, C.R., eds. (1990). "Cogges". A History of the County of Oxford. Victoria County History. Vol. 12: Wootton Hundred (South) including Woodstock. Victoria County History of the Counties of England. pp. 54–75. ISBN 0-19-722774-0.
- Page, William, ed. (1907). A History of the County of Oxford, Volume 2. Victoria County History. Archibald Constable & Co. pp. 161–162.
- Sherwood, Jennifer; Pevsner, Nikolaus (1974). Oxfordshire. The Buildings of England. Harmondsworth: Penguin Books. pp. 550–551. ISBN 0-14-071045-0.
- Steane, John M., ed. (1984). Cogges A guide to the museum and village. (sic). Cogges Agricultural Heritage Museum Association Limited. ISBN 0-901036-06-4.
