= Richard Hale (physician) =

English physician

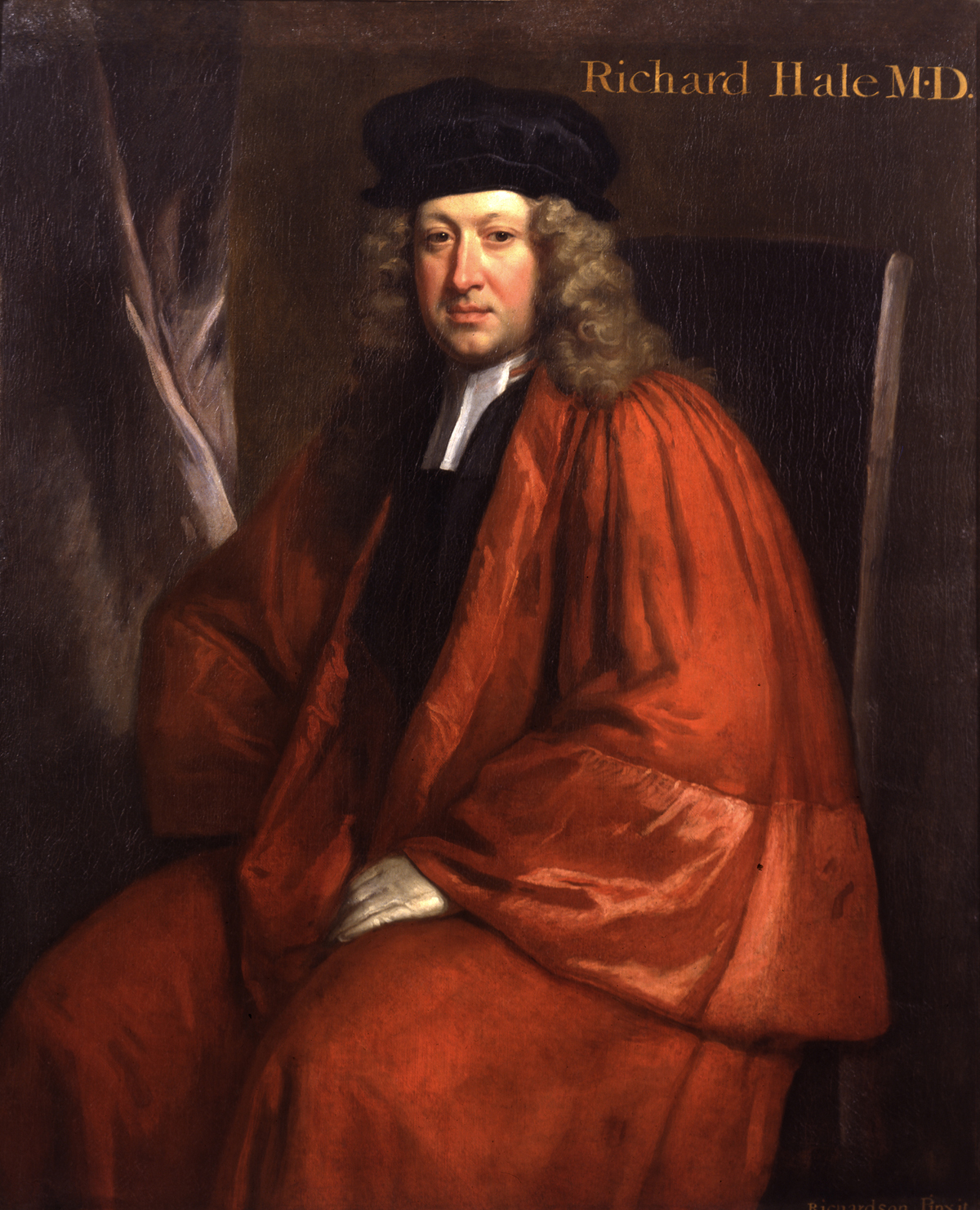
Richard Hale

Richard Hale M.D. (1670–1728) was an English physician, elected a Fellow of the Royal Society in 1721.

== Life ==
The eldest son of Richard Hale of New Windsor, Berkshire, he was born at Beckenham, Kent, in 1670. He entered Trinity College, Oxford, with his younger brother, Henry, in June 1689, where Thomas Sykes was his tutor. He graduated B.A. on 19 May 1693, M.A. on 4 February 1695, M.B. on 11 February 1697, and M.D. on 23 June 1701.

Hale first was in practice in Oxford, where his use of opiates undermined his reputation. He settled in London, and was elected a fellow of the College of Physicians on 9 April 1716. He was three times a censor of the College.

Mentored by Edward Tyson, Hale succeeded him as physician to the Bridewell and Bethlehem Hospitals (Bedlam) in 1708. As a clinician he was influenced by iatromechanics; his reputation, after his death, was for mild treatment of mental illness, for example by sedation, rather than physical restraints. He put in place a system for regulating admissions and discharges at Bethlem.

Hale was married, to Frances, widow of Richard Lloyd.

At the end of his life, as a private psychiatric patient, Hale attended Frances, wife of John Erskine, Earl of Mar, by that time a Jacobite exile in Paris. Frances, daughter of Evelyn Pierrepont, 1st Duke of Kingston-upon-Hull, and sister of Lady Mary Wortley Montagu who cared for her in England and brought in Hale, is now considered to have been suffering from clinical depression. This high-profile case was managed discreetly, in its aspects of lunacy and custody proceedings. Hale's judgement that Lady Mar was insane was later reversed, after his death, by Richard Mead. After caring for Lady Mar over only about two months, Hale was followed by either Richard Tyson (1680–1750), married to his niece Elizabeth Hale and son of Edward Tyson, or James Monro (1680–1752) who succeeded him at Bedlam.

== Works ==
Hale delivered the Harveian oration in 1724. It was published in 1725, and contains an account of the English medieval physicians.

== Death and legacy ==
Escutcheon of Richard Hale

Hale died on 26 September 1728, a wealthy man. He gave the College of Physicians £500 for their library, and his arms, vert, three pheons argent, were used on its books. His nephew Thomas Tower succeeded to his estates in Buckinghamshire and Essex.
