= Robert Hucks =

English brewer and Whig politician

Robert Hucks (1699–1745) of Clifton Hampden near Abingdon, and Aldenham House, Hertfordshire, was an English brewer and Whig politician who sat in the House of Commons from 1722 to 1741.

== Early life ==
Hucks was baptised on 5 March 1699, the eldest surviving son of William Hucks brewer of St Giles-in-the-Fields and his wife Elizabeth Selwood, daughter of Robert Selwood of Abingdon, Berkshire. He was admitted at Trinity College, Cambridge on 6 January 1717 and at Inner Temple on 11 January 1720. He married Sarah Coghill, daughter of Henry Coghill of Pennes Place, in Aldenham on 22 December 1730. She brought him Aldenham House, which was built on the estate of Penns Place.

== Career ==
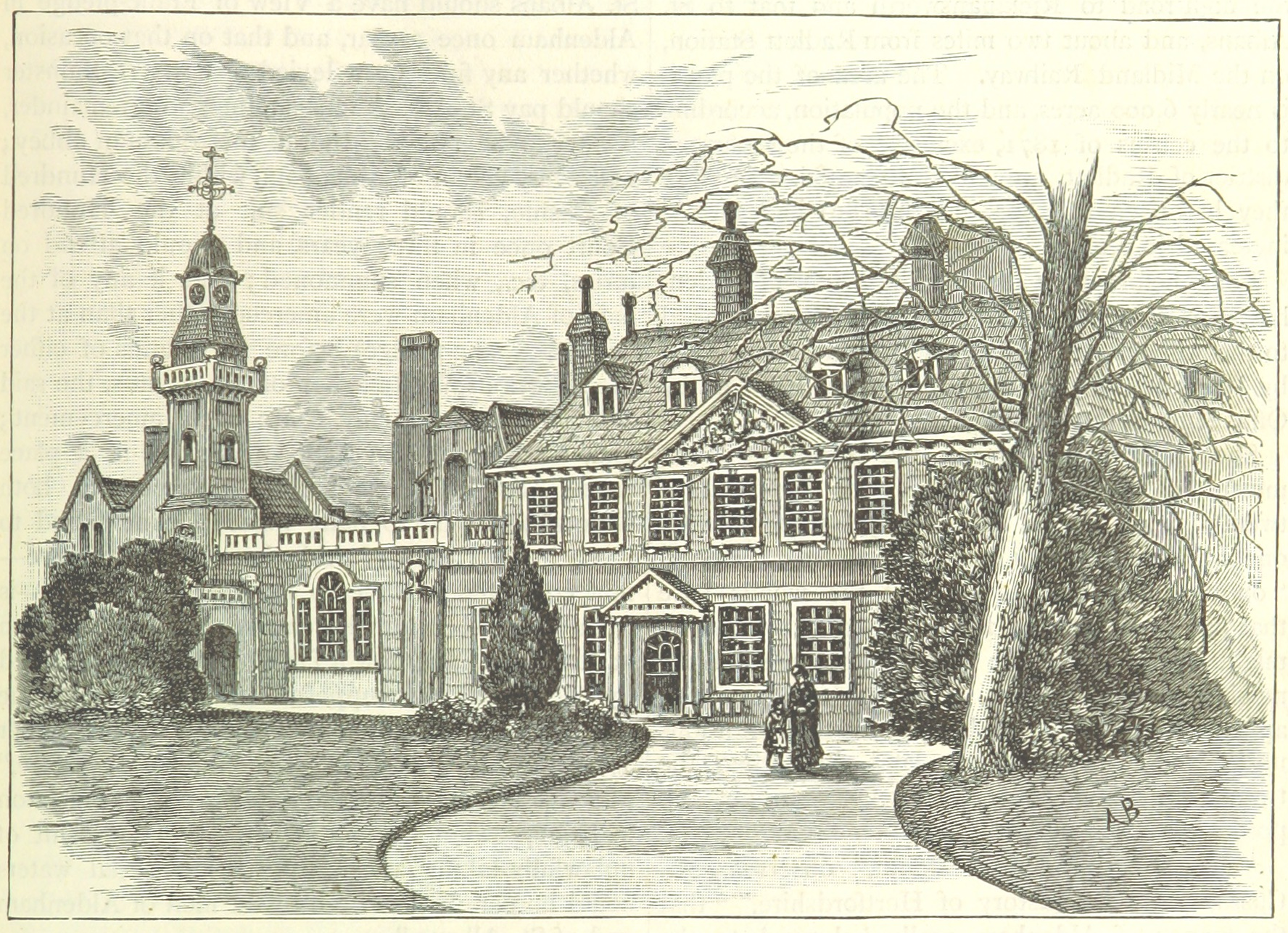
Aldenham House drawn in 1882

Hucks was elected as Member of Parliament for Abingdon at the 1722 general election and consistently voted with the government. In 1726, he purchased Clifton manor from the trustees of the profligate Edmund Dunch. He was re-elected in a contest at the 1727 general election. In 1733 he was appointed Recorder of Wallingford. He faced another contested election in 1734 and was elected again as MP for Abingdon.

Hucks was an enemy of religious establishments and in 1736 he opposed a grant to repair the Henry VII Chapel and promoted a mortmain bill to prevent land being alienated to religious and charitable institutions. In 1737 he resigned as a councillor of the Georgia Trustees over plans to endow land for a church there. He succeeded his father to the brewery in 1740 and assumed his father's office as King’s brewer. He did not stand at the 1741 general election. In 1743 he presented the Treasury with a petition on behalf of London victuallers which sought the repeal of the Pot Act, which imposed a levy on publicans. He became treasurer of the Foundling Hospital in 1744.

== Death and legacy ==
Hucks died aged 46 on 21 December 1745 and was buried on 30 December at St John the Baptist, Aldenham, where there is a monumental inscription. He and his wife had two sons and six daughters. Clifton passed to his son Robert who became a lunatic, and on his death it passed by inheritance to Anne and Sarah Noyes, nieces of Robert Hucks.

Parliament of Great Britain
Preceded by James Jennings	Member of Parliament for Abingdon; 1722–1741	Succeeded by John Wright
