= Thomas Tower (MP) =

English lawyer and Member of Parliament

Thomas Tower (1698? – 2 September 1778) of Weald House, Essex, was an English lawyer and Member of Parliament.

He was born the second son of Christopher Tower senior and the younger brother of Christopher Tower. After being educated at Harrow School (c.1711) and Trinity College, Oxford (1717) he entered the Inner Temple in 1717 to study law, being called to the bar in 1722 and becoming a bencher in 1751.

In 1728 Tower succeeded his father in his property in Mansfield in Iver, Buckinghamshire, and his uncle Richard Hale to his estates in Buckinghamshire and Essex estates. He was elected to Parliament for Wareham in 1729, sitting until 1734, after which he represented Wallingford from 1734 to 1741.

In 1732, he became an active trustee and councilman for the newly formed colony of Georgia on the east coast of America.

He bought Weald House near Brentwood, Essex, in 1759 and was High Sheriff of Essex for 1760–1761. He died unmarried in 1778.

== See also ==
- Trustees for the Establishment of the Colony of Georgia in America

Parliament of Great Britain
Preceded by Sir Edward Ernle, Bt; Nathaniel Gould	Member of Parliament for Wareham; 1729–1734; With: Nathaniel Gould	Succeeded by Henry Drax; John Pitt
Preceded by George Lewen; William Hucks	Member of Parliament for Wallingford; 1734–1741; With: William Hucks 1734–40; Joseph Townsend 1740–41	Succeeded by Henry Drax; John Pitt
