= George Lewen =

British politician (died 1743)

George Lewen (died 1743), of Ewell, Surrey, was a British Tory politician who sat in the House of Commons from 1727 to 1734.

Lewen was the eldest son of George Lewen, merchant of Poole, Dorset, and his wife Catharine. In 1718, he succeeded his father. He married Susan Godschall, daughter of John Godschall, a merchant trading with Turkey, and sister of Sir Robert Godschall. She was buried at All Hallows Barking by Tower in January 1719 aged 28. In 1722, Lewen succeeded to the Ewell estates of his uncle, Sir William Lewen.

At the 1727 British general election, Lewen was returned head of the poll as Tory Member of Parliament for Wallingford, according to the petition against him ‘by most notorious bribery’, menaces and promises. He voted consistently against the Administration. After losing his seat at the 1734 British general election, he lodged a petition but later withdrew it.

Lewen married, as his second wife, in November 1732, Elizabeth Shatterden, daughter of Thomas Shatterden, afterwards Drax, sister of Henry Drax. Lewen died on 1 April 1743 leaving by his first wife a daughter, Susannah, who married Sir Richard Glyn, 1st Baronet, of Ewell. Lewen appears to have fallen out with all members of his family and left them little in his will apart from highly vindictive comments. The bulk of his estate was left to the Bridewell and Bethlehem Hospitals.

Parliament of Great Britain
Preceded by Viscount Parker; William Hucks	Member of Parliament for Wallingford; 1727–1734; With: William Hucks	Succeeded by Thomas Tower; William Hucks
