= William Hucks =

English brewer and Whig politician

William Hucks (1672–1740) was an English brewer and Whig politician who sat in the House of Commons between 1709 and 1740.

== Early life ==
Hucks was baptized on 22 October 1672, the eldest son of William Hucks, brewer of St Giles-in-the-Fields and his wife Lydia Head. His father owned the Horn brewery in Duke Street, Bloomsbury. Hucks followed his father's trade and was made a Freeman of the Brewers’ Company in 1687. He inherited the brewery when his father died in 1691 and worked it with his brothers and later his son. He married by licence dated 1 September 1696, Elizabeth Selwood, daughter of Robert Selwood of Abingdon, Berkshire.

== Political career ==
At the 1698 election, Hucks stood unsuccessfully for Parliament at Abingdon. He stood again at the 1708 general election, and though defeated in the poll, was returned as Member of Parliament for Abingdon on petition on 20 January 1709. He followed Whig policies by supporting the naturalization of the Palatines in 1709 and the impeachment of Dr Sacheverell in 1710. At the 1710 general election, he stood for Parliament at Wallingford, but was unsuccessful. He was elected MP for Wallingford in a contest at the 1715 general election. Also in 1715, he was appointed King's Brewer. In parliament he voted consistently with the Government. He retained his seat in further contested elections in 1722, 1727 and 1734.

== Later life and legacy ==
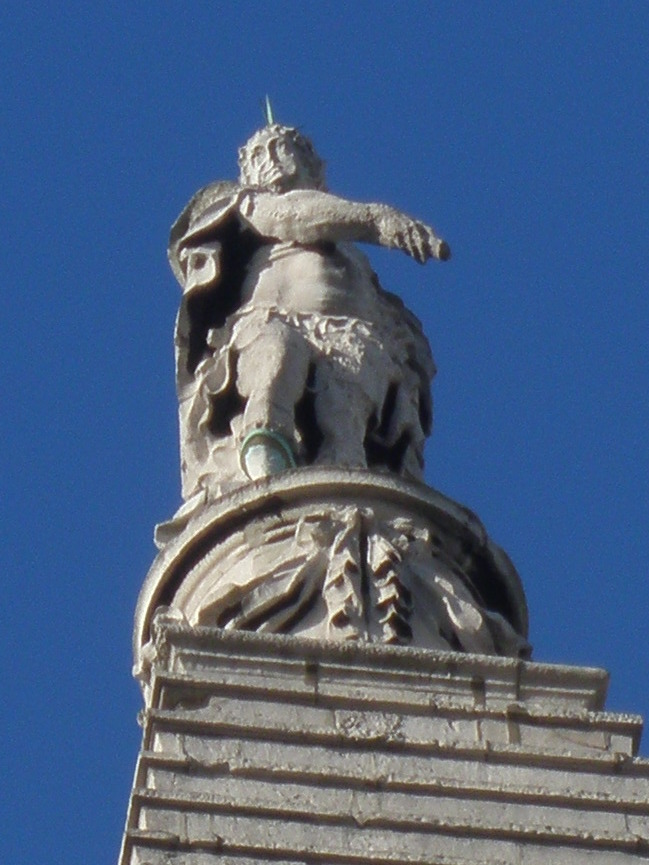
Statue of King George I on St George's, Bloomsbury

Hucks maintained his involvement in the parish of St Giles and was a vestryman between 1709 and 1731. He was responsible for the raising of a statue of George I which was set up on the steeple of St George's, Bloomsbury. He increased his holding of land in the Wallingford area, and acquired a lease of Wallingford Castle which included Ewelme in about 1727. He died on 28 November 1740. He and his wife had two sons and a daughter. He was succeeded by his only surviving son Robert.

Parliament of Great Britain
Preceded by Sir Simon Harcourt	Member of Parliament for Abingdon; 1709 –1710	Succeeded by Sir Simon Harcourt
Preceded by Richard Bigg; Thomas Renda	Member of Parliament for Wallingford; 1715–1740; With: Edmund Dunch 1715-1719; Henry Grey 1719-1722; Viscount Parker 1722-1727; George Lewen 1727-1734; Thomas Tower 1734-1740	Succeeded by Thomas Tower; Joseph Townsend
