= George Richards (priest) =

English Anglican priest and poet

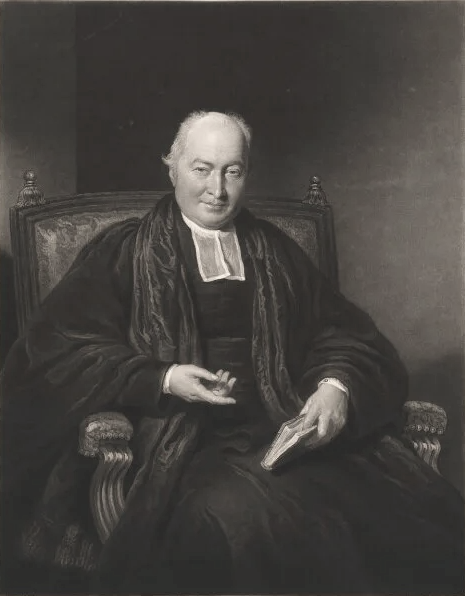
George Richards

George Richards (1767 – 30 March 1837) was an English Anglican priest and poet.

== Life ==
The son of James Richards, later vicar of Rainham, Kent, George Richards was baptised on 15 September 1767. He was admitted at Christ's Hospital, London, in June 1776, and was then described as from Hadleigh in Suffolk. Charles Lamb knew him at school, and called him "a pale, studious Grecian."

On 10 March 1775 Richards matriculated at Trinity College, Oxford, becoming a scholar of his college in 1786. He gained two chancellor's prizes: in 1787 for Latin verse, and in 1789 for an English essay "On the characteristic Differences between Ancient and Modern Poetry". In 1791 George Harcourt, 2nd Earl Harcourt gave anonymously a prize for an English poem on the "Aboriginal Britons". This Richards won, and Harcourt became his lifelong friend. The poem was printed separately and in sets of ‘Oxford Prize Poems.’ It was praised by Lord Byron in his English Bards and Scotch Reviewers.

Richards graduated Bachelor of Arts (BA) on 4 November 1788, Oxford Master of Arts (MA Oxon) on 11 July 1791, and Bachelor of Divinity (BD) and Doctor of Divinity (DD) in 1820. In 1790, when he took holy orders, he was elected to a fellowship at Oriel College, and remained there until 1796. He was appointed Bampton lecturer in 1800, and select preacher in 1804 and 1811.

From 1796, when he married, to 1824, Richard was one of the vicars of Bampton, and rector of Lillingstone Lovel in Oxfordshire. In July 1824 he was appointed to the more valuable vicarage of St Martin-in-the-Fields in Westminster. There he built a new vicarage, contributed towards the erection of the church of St Michael in Burleigh Street, Strand, and served for some years as treasurer of Charing Cross Hospital. In 1822 he became a governor of Christ's Hospital.

In 1799 Richards was elected Fellow of the Society of Antiquaries. He died at Russell Square, London, on 30 March 1837, and was buried in a special vault in the churchyard of St. Martin's-in-the-Fields on 6 April. He had married, on 6 October 1796.

== Works ==
Richards published, besides the works above:

- Songs of the Aboriginal Bards of Britain, 1792.
- Modern France: a Poem, 1793.
- Matilda, or the Dying Penitent, a poetical epistle, 1795.
- The Divine Origin of Prophecy illustrated and defended (Bampton Lectures), 1800.
- Odin, a drama, 1804.
- Emma, a drama on the model of the Greek theatre, 1804.
- Poems, 1804, 2 vols.; the first volume was dedicated to Harcourt, the second to his fellow priest William Benwell; most of the poems which he had previously published were reprinted in this collection.
- Monody on Death of Lord Nelson, 1806.
