= Elizabeth Harcourt, Countess Harcourt =

British courtier (1747–1826)

The Right Honourable The Countess of Harcourt
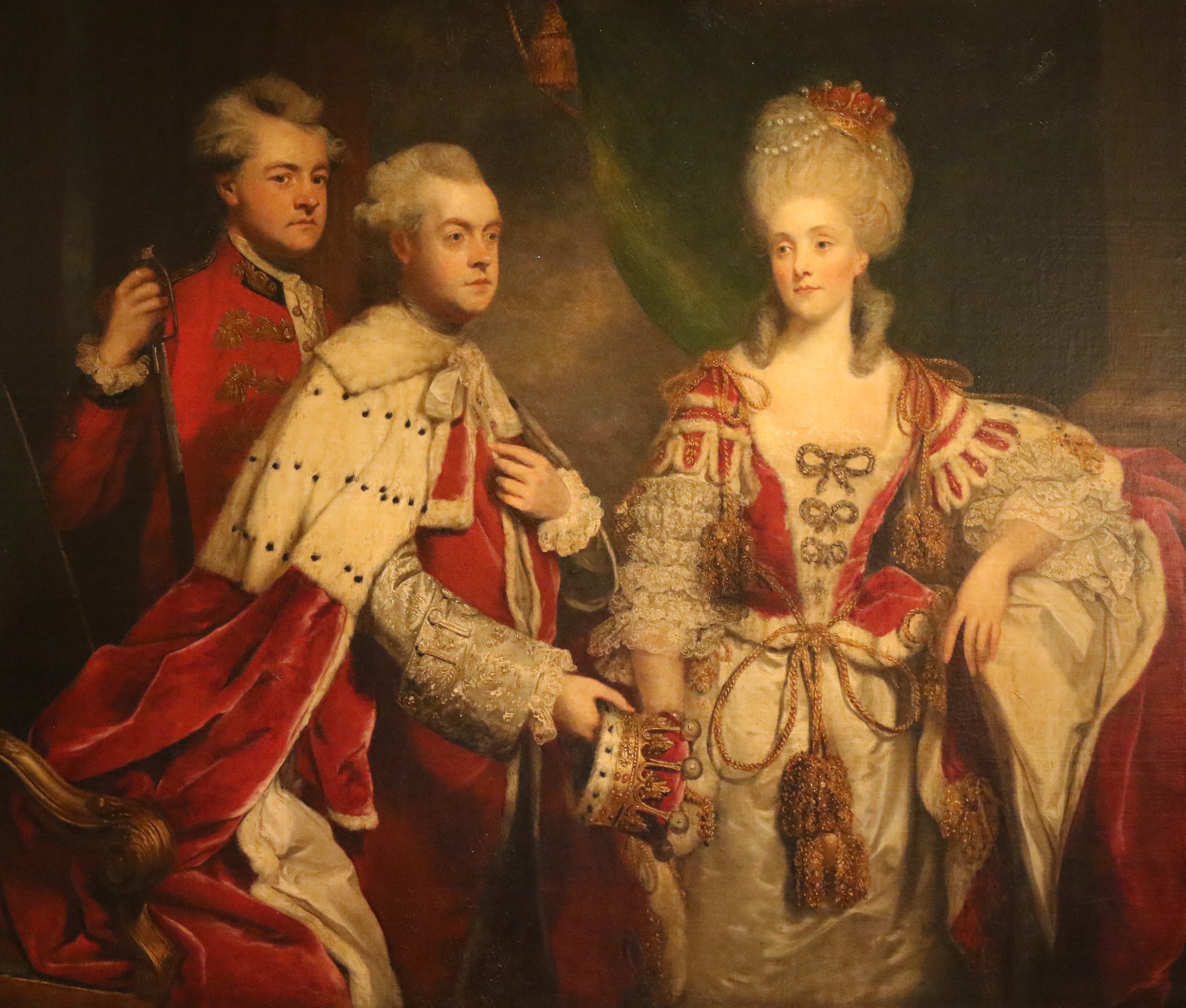
- c. 1780 portrait of Harcourt (first from right) by Sir Joshua Reynolds
- Born: 1747
- Died: 1826 (aged 78–79)
- Spouse: George Harcourt, 2nd Earl Harcourt
- Father: George Venables-Vernon, 1st Baron Vernon
- Mother: Martha Harcourt

Elizabeth Harcourt, Countess Harcourt (née Venables-Vernon; 1747 – 1826) was a British courtier.

== Life ==
Elizabeth Harcourt was the daughter of George Venables-Vernon, 1st Baron Vernon (1709–1780) and Martha Harcourt (1715–1794). In 1765, she married her first cousin George Harcourt, 2nd Earl Harcourt (1736–1809).

She was served as a lady of the Bedchamber to the queen, Charlotte of Mecklenburg-Strelitz, between 1784 and 1817. She was a great favorite of the queen and described as one of the queen's circle of favorites and personal friends. The queen encouraged Harcourt to write occasional verse, which she did, on one occasion addressed to Elizabeth Montagu.

Her position as the confidante of the queen was described:

"Lady Harcourt, daughter-in-law of the Lord Harcourt who some five-and-twenty years before had been despatched to Strelitz to arrange the marriage, had always continued on terms of the most affectionate intimacy with the queen. She was one of her ladies, and to her the queen unbosomed her thoughts and feelings in the most confidential way; for no family, as we have said, did the royal pair show such an unbounded affection."

Many letters from the correspondence between Elizabeth Harcourt, the queen and other members of the royal family are preserved.

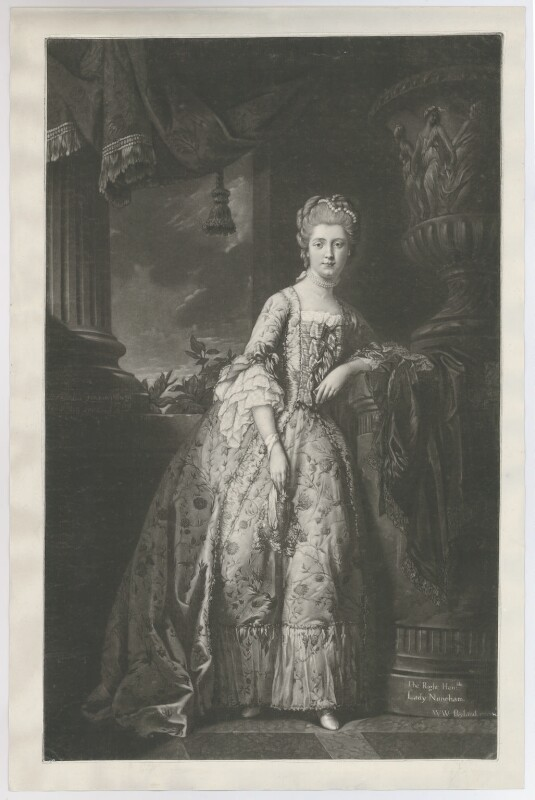
Elizabeth Harcourt (nee Vernon) when Lady Nuneham. Before 1783.

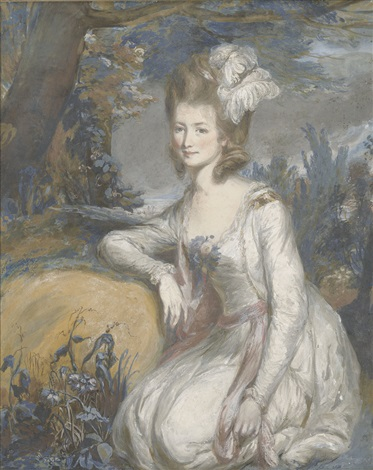
Drawing of Elizabeth, Countess Harcourt by Daniel Gardner, c.1770s-80s.
