= Cokethorpe School =

Coordinates: 51.753°N 1.465°W

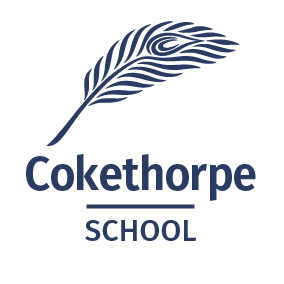
- Cokethorpe's new school branding 2021
- Witney, Oxfordshire, OX29 7PU; England

Information
- Type: Private day school
- Motto: Inopiam Ingenio Pensant ('Ingenuity overcomes scarcity' or 'They make good their needs by their wit')
- Religious affiliations: Church of England and Roman Catholic
- Established: 1957
- Chairman of Governors: John Bennett
- Head: Sarah Squire
- Gender: Boys until 1992; Coeducational from 1992
- Age: 4 to 18
- Enrolment: about 660
- Houses: Senior School: Feilden, Gascoigne, Harcourt, Queen Anne, Swift, Lower House and Vanbrugh. Prep School: Baker, Gwyn, Lockwood and Symonds.
- Colours: Navy blue and gold
- Publication: The Ocellus- The termly newsletter & The SHEDule- The list of the academic year's event
- Former Pupils: The Cokethorpe Society
- Setting: Rural (150 acres)
- Website: www.cokethorpe.org.uk

Cokethorpe School is a private day school in Witney, West Oxfordshire, England. The school was founded in 1957 by Francis Brown. It is a member of the Headmasters' and Headmistresses' Conference and Independent Association of Prep Schools. The school has approximately 660 students from ages 4 to 18.

== History ==
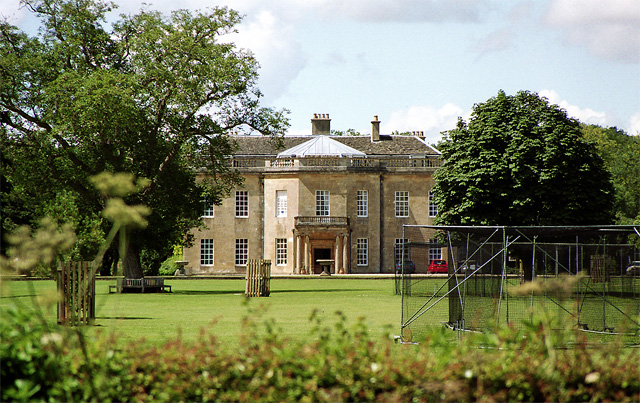
Cokethorpe School

The country house was used by Simon Harcourt, 1st Viscount Harcourt. When Major Percy Henry Guy Feilden and his wife, Dorothy Louisa Brand, moved there in 1908, they undertook extensive renovations. He died on 25 March 1944 and was buried there.

His son, Major-General Randle Guy Feilden, who was later knighted, was his successor. In 1957, it was left with part of the grounds to Francis Brown, who opened the school as a secondary boys' boarding school with 14 pupils. In about 1960 Yarnton Manor was used as a dormitory of the school. In 1963, a charitable trust was formed, and in 1966, the school buildings and grounds were sold to the school trustees.

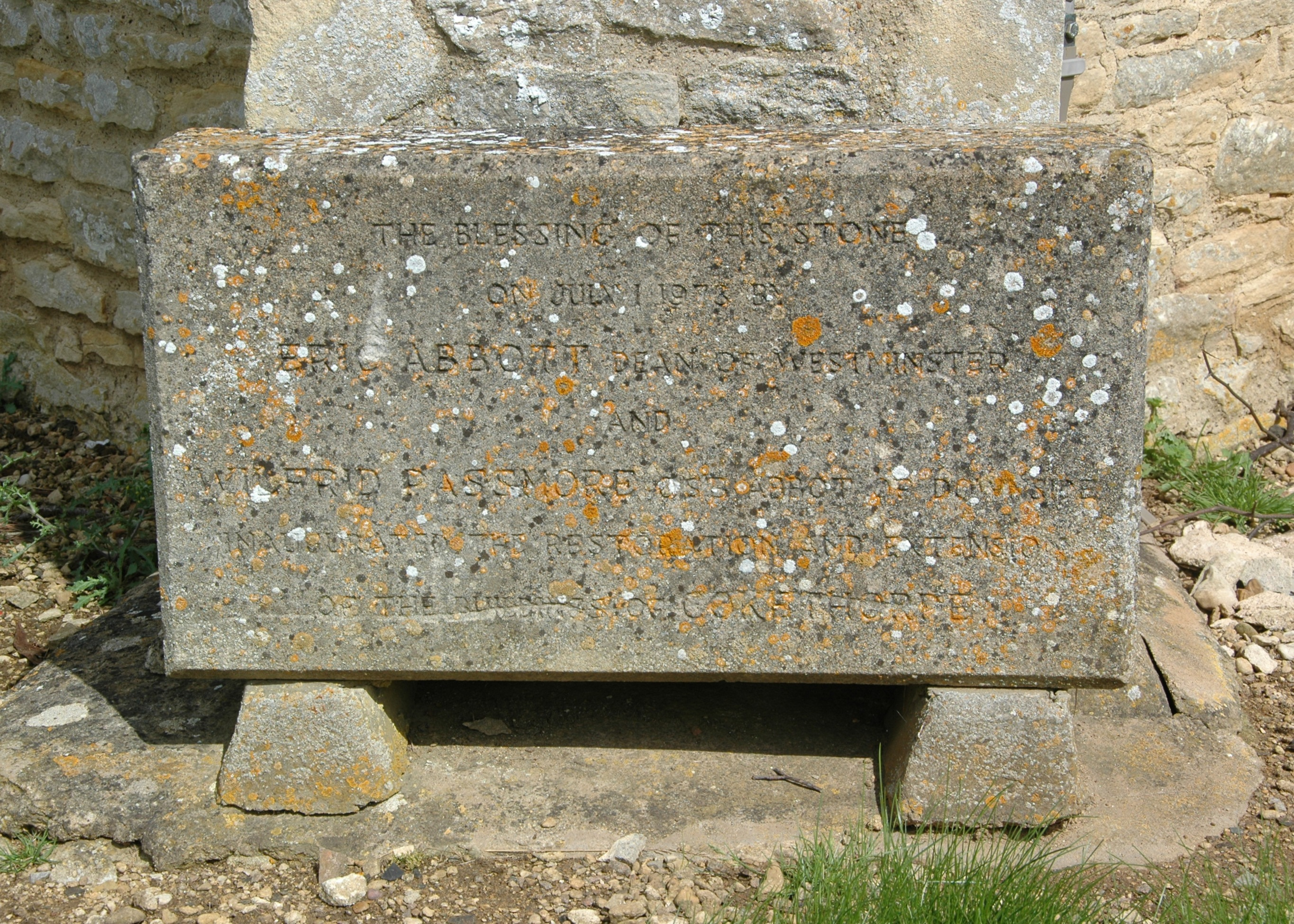
Stone commemorating restoration and extension of the school chapel in 1973

Cokethorpe School is a joint Church of England and Roman Catholic foundation. The chapel is on the golf course on the school grounds. It is the former parish church of Hardwick and was restored and extended in 1973.

In 1985, the roof of the northwest wing was studied while the building was being repaired. In 1986 work began on the construction of further buildings. The school started admitting girls in 1992 and opened a Prep School in 1994. The boarding facility was closed in 2003.

== Facilities ==
The school is in a Grade II* listed 18th-century Queen Anne style country house.

== Notable former pupils ==
- Martin Edwards, former Manchester United chairman
- Andrew Loog Oldham, record producer, talent manager, impresario and author
- Toby Sebastian, actor
