= Simon Harcourt, 1st Viscount Harcourt =

British politician (1661–1727)

The Right Honourable The Viscount Harcourt PC
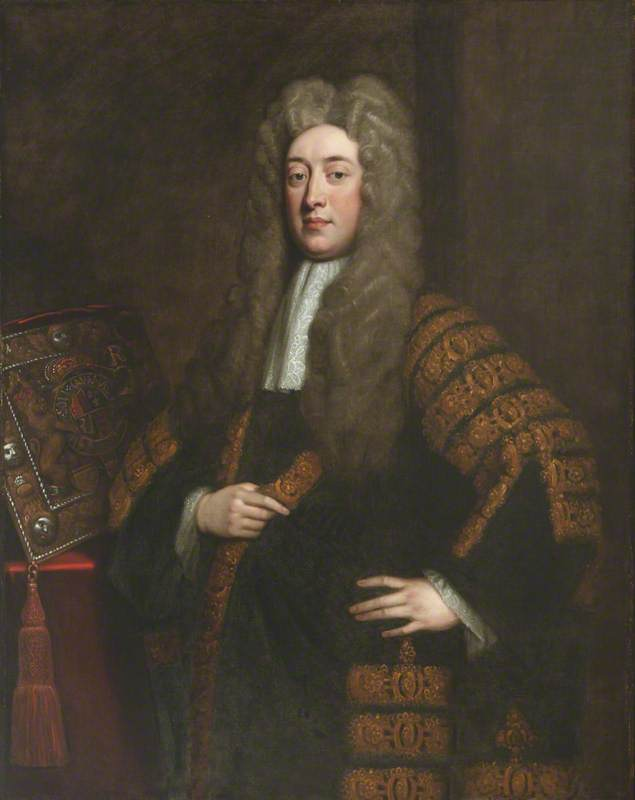
- Portrait by Godfrey Kneller

Lord Keeper of the Great Seal
- In office 19 October 1710 – 7 April 1713
- Monarch: Anne
- Preceded by: In Commission
- Succeeded by: himself as Lord Chancellor

Lord Chancellor
- In office 7 April 1713 – 21 September 1714
- Monarchs: Anne; George I
- Preceded by: himself as Lord Keeper
- Succeeded by: The Lord Cowper

Personal details
- Born: c. 1661
- Died: 29 July 1727
- Party: Tory
- Education: Pembroke College, Oxford

Simon Harcourt, 1st Viscount Harcourt, PC (December 1661 – 29 July 1727) of Stanton Harcourt, Oxfordshire, was an English Tory politician who sat in the English and British House of Commons from 1690 until 1710. He was raised to the peerage as Baron Harcourt in 1711 and sat in the House of Lords, becoming Queen Anne's Lord High Chancellor of Great Britain. He was her solicitor-general and her commissioner for arranging the union with Scotland. He took part in the negotiations preceding the Peace of Utrecht.

== Early life ==
Harcourt was born in December 1661 at Stanton Harcourt, Oxfordshire, to Stanton Harcourt, the only son of Sir Philip Harcourt, and his first wife Anne Waller, daughter of Sir William Waller of Osterley Park, Middlesex. He was educated at a school at Shilton, Oxfordshire, under Samuel Birch, to 1677 and was admitted at Inner Temple in 1676. He matriculated at Pembroke College, Oxford, on 30 March 1677, aged 15, and was awarded BA in 1679. In 1683, he was Called to the Bar. He had four brothers and four sisters from his father's second marriage in 1674 to Elizabeth Lee. He succeeded to the family estates on the death of his father on 20 March 1688.

== Career ==
Harcourt was recorder of Abingdon from June to December 1687 and, after a break at the time of the revolution, from October 1689 to April 1711. At the 1690 English general election, he was returned as Tory Member of Parliament for Abingdon. In 1701 he was nominated by the Commons to conduct the impeachment of Lord Somers. In 1702 he became solicitor-general and was knighted by Queen Anne. In the same year he became bencher and treasurer of his Inn and was awarded DCL at Oxford University. At the 1705 English general election, he was returned as MP for Bossiney, and as commissioner for arranging the union with Scotland which he was largely instrumental in promoting. Harcourt was appointed attorney-general in 1707, but resigned office in the following year when his friend Robert Harley, afterwards Earl of Oxford, was dismissed.

Harcourt defended Sacheverell at the bar of the House of Lords in 1710, being then without a seat in Parliament; but in the same year was returned for Cardigan, and in September again became attorney-general. In October he was appointed lord keeper of the great seal, and in virtue of this office he presided in the House of Lords for some months without a peerage, until, on 3 September 1711, he was created Baron Harcourt of Stanton Harcourt; but it was not till April 1713 that he received the appointment of Lord Chancellor. In 1710 he had purchased the Nuneham Courtenay estate in Oxfordshire, but his usual place of residence continued to be at Cokethorpe near Stanton Harcourt, where he once received a state visit from Queen Anne.

In the negotiations preceding the Peace of Utrecht, Harcourt took an important part. There is no sufficient evidence for the allegations of the Whigs that Harcourt entered into treasonable relations with the Pretender. On the accession of George I however, he was deprived of office and retired to Cokethorpe, where he enjoyed the society of men of letters, Swift, Pope, Prior and other famous writers being among his frequent guests. With Swift, however, he had occasional quarrels, during one of which the great satirist bestowed on him the sobriquet of "Trimming Harcourt."

He exerted himself to defeat the impeachment of Lord Oxford in 1717, and in 1723 he was active in obtaining a pardon for another old political friend, Lord Bolingbroke. In 1721 Harcourt was created a viscount and returned to the privy councils; and on several occasions during the king's absences from England he was on the Council of Regency. In 1726, he acquired the manor of Cogges from the heirs of Sir Francis Blake.

== Private life ==
Harcourt enjoyed the reputation of being a brilliant orator; Speaker Onslow going so far as to say that "Harcourt had the greatest skill and power of speech of any man I ever knew in a public assembly." He was a member of the famous Saturday Club, frequented by the chief literati and wits of the period, with several of whom he corresponded. Some letters to him from Pope are preserved in the Harcourt Papers. His portrait was painted by Kneller; it was once at Nuneham House.

Harcourt married first at St Marylebone on 18 October 1680 Rebecca Clarke (buried at Chipping Norton, Oxfordshire, 16 May 1687), daughter of the Rev. Thomas Clarke, his father's chaplain, by whom he had five children; secondly Elizabeth Spencer (c. 1657 – Downing Street, 16 June 1724), daughter of Richard Spencer; and thirdly in Oxfordshire on 30 September 1724 Elizabeth Vernon (c. 1678 – 12 July 1748), daughter of Sir Thomas Vernon, of Twickenham Park. He left children by his first wife only:

- Hon. Simon Harcourt (1684 – 1 July 1720), who was MP for Wallingford, and predeceased his father, the Lord Chancellor, leaving a son, married Elizabeth Evelyn, sister of Sir John Evelyn, of Wotton, and daughter of John Evelyn, by whom he had one son and four daughters:
  - Simon Harcourt, 1st Earl Harcourt
  - Hon. Martha Harcourt (15 July 1715 – London, Lower Grosvenor Street, 8 April 1794), married at St George, Hanover Square, on 10 April 1744 George Venables-Vernon, afterwards Baron Vernon (9 February 1708 – 21 August 1780)
  - Hon. Anne Harcourt
  - Hon. Elizabeth Harcourt
  - Hon. daughter Harcourt
- Hon. Philip Harcourt, died young
- Hon. Anne Harcourt, married John Barlow
- Hon. Arabella Harcourt, married Herbert Aubrey

He died at 2am at Harcourt House, Cavendish Square, and was interred at Stanton Harcourt 4 August.

== Sources ==
- Lord Campbell, Lives of the Lord Chancellors, vol. v. (London, 1846);
- Edward Foss, The Judges of England, vol. viii. (London, 1848);
- Gilbert Burnet, History of his own Time (with notes by earls of Dartmouth and Hardwicke, etc., Oxford, 1833);
- Earl Stanhope, History of England, comprising the reign of Queen Anne until the Peace of Utrecht (London, 1870).

Parliament of EnglandThe
Preceded by Sir John Stonhouse, Bt	Member of Parliament for Abingdon; 1690–1705	Succeeded by Grey Neville
Preceded by John Manley; William Hooker	Member of Parliament for Bossiney; 1705–1707; With: John Manley	Succeeded by Parliament of Great Britain
Parliament of Great Britain
Preceded by Parliament of England	Member of Parliament for Bossiney; 1707–1708; With: John Manley	Succeeded by Samuel Travers; Francis Foote
Preceded by Grey Neville	Member of Parliament for Abingdon; 1708–1709	Succeeded by William Hucks
Preceded by Lewis Pryse	Member of Parliament for Cardigan; 1710	Succeeded by John Meyrick
Preceded by William Hucks	Member of Parliament for Abingdon; 1710	Succeeded by James Jennings
Political offices
Preceded by In Commission	Lord Keeper of the Great Seal; 1710–1713	Succeeded by The Lord Cowper
Preceded by In Commission	Lord High Chancellor of Great Britain; 1713–1714	Succeeded by The Lord Cowper
Legal offices
Preceded by Sir John Hawles	Solicitor General; 1702–1707	Succeeded by Sir James Montagu
Preceded by Sir Edward Northey	Attorney General; 1707–1708	Succeeded by Sir James Montagu
Preceded by Sir James Montagu	Attorney General; 1710	Succeeded by Sir Edward Northey
Peerage of Great Britain
New creation	Viscount Harcourt; 1721–1727	Succeeded by Simon Harcourt
New creation	Baron Harcourt; 1711–1727	Succeeded by Simon Harcourt
