= Simon Harcourt (1684–1720) =

English politician

- Born: October 9, 1664
- Died: July 1, 1720 (aged 55)
- Occupation: Politician

Hon. Simon Harcourt (9 October 1684 – 1 July 1720) was an English politician who sat in the House of Commons from 1710 to 1715.

== Biography ==
Harcourt was the eldest surviving son of Simon Harcourt, 1st Viscount Harcourt by his first wife, Rebecca Clarke, daughter of the Rev. Thomas Clarke, his father's chaplain. His mother and elder brother died when he was young and he became heir apparent to the Viscountcy. He was subject to the high expectations of his father. He was educated at Eton College in 1698 and was admitted at Inner Temple in 1701 and matriculated at Christ Church, Oxford on 3 November 1702. In 1706, he travelled abroad in Italy, and that year attended Padua University. In 1710, he was called to the bar.

Harcourt was elected as Member of Parliament for Wallingford at the 1710 general election. He was abroad, probably for his health for most of the first half of 1713 and missed the campaign for the 1713 general election. His father had put him forward for Oxfordshire, Oxford University where he was awarded MA at Oxford in the previous year, Wallingford and Abingdon. He was only returned for Abingdon where he was unopposed. He was defeated at the 1715 general election.

Harcourt remained in poor health and took the waters in Wales and abroad. He died in Paris on 1 July 1720, apparently from liver damage through drinking too much burgundy and champagne and was buried at Stanton Harcourt.

== Family and issue ==
On 21 July 1709, Harcourt married Elizabeth Evelyn (died 1760), daughter of John Evelyn of Wootton, Surrey, and sister of his Eton schoolfriend, Sir John Evelyn, 1st Baronet. He left one surviving son and two surviving daughters. His son succeeded as 2nd Viscount in 1727 and in 1749 was created Earl Harcourt. One daughter, Martha, married George Venables-Vernon, 1st Baron Vernon.

Parliament of Great Britain
Preceded by Thomas Renda; Grey Neville	Member of Parliament for Wallingford; 1710–1713; With: Thomas Renda	Succeeded by Richard Bigg; Simon Harcourt
Preceded by James Jennings	Member of Parliament for Abingdon; 1713–1715	Succeeded by James Jennings
