= Stanton Harcourt =

Village in Oxfordshire, England

Coordinates: 51°44′56″N 1°24′07″W

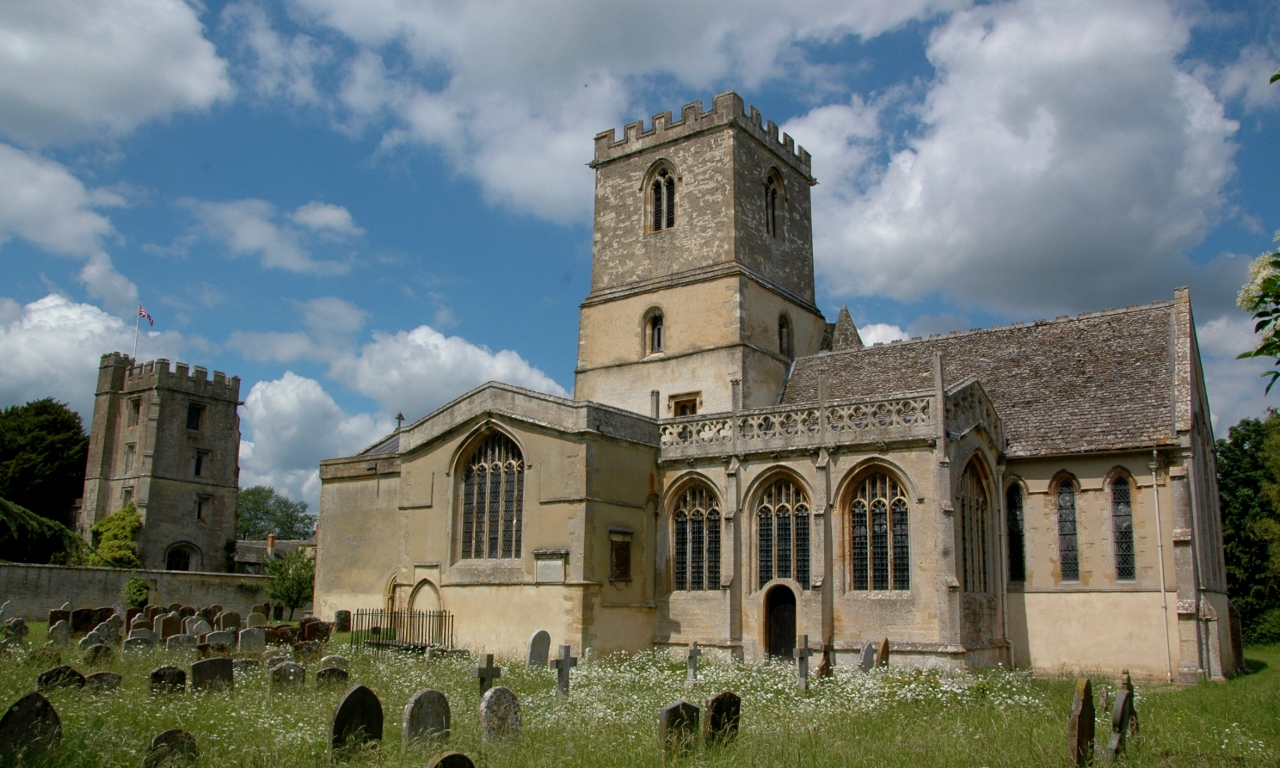
- St Michael's parish church, with Pope's Tower in the background on the left

- Location within Oxfordshire
- Population: 960 (2011 Census)
- OS grid reference: SP4105
- Civil parish: Stanton Harcourt
- District: West Oxfordshire
- Shire county: Oxfordshire
- Region: South East
- Country: England
- Sovereign state: United Kingdom
- Post town: Witney
- Postcode district: OX29
- Dialling code: 01865
- Police: Thames Valley
- Fire: Oxfordshire
- Ambulance: South Central
- UK Parliament: Witney
- Website: Stanton Harcourt Parish Council

Stanton Harcourt is a village and civil parish in Oxfordshire about 4 miles (6.4 km) southeast of Witney and about 6 miles (10 km) west of Oxford. The parish includes the hamlet of Sutton, 1/2 mile (800 m) north of the village. The 2011 Census recorded the parish's population as 960.

== Archaeology ==
Within the parish of Stanton Harcourt is a series of palaeochannel deposits buried beneath the second (Summertown-Radley) gravel terrace of the River Thames. The deposits have been attributed to Marine isotope stages and have been the subject of archaeological and palaeontological research. Evidence was found for the co-existence of species of elephant and mammoth during interglacial conditions, disproving the widely held view that mammoths were an exclusively cold-adapted species.

== Manor ==
Stanton is derived from the Old English for "farmstead by the stones", probably after the prehistoric stone circle known as the Devil's Quoits, southwest of the village. The site is a scheduled monument. The Domesday Book of 1086 records that the manor was held by Odo, Bishop of Bayeux. It became Stanton Harcourt after Robert de Harcourt of Bosworth, Leicestershire inherited lands of his father-in-law at Stanton in 1191.

Harcourt House was built for the Harcourt family in the 15th and mid-16th centuries, and its gatehouse was added about 1540. Harcourt House is a Grade II* listed building. Its Great Kitchen was built in 1485, possibly incorporating an earlier building. The kitchen is a separate building from the house and is Grade I listed. The service range attached to the south of the Great Kitchen is also 15th-century. It has been converted into a house, Manor Farmhouse, and is Grade I listed.

Pope's Tower in the grounds of Harcourt House was built about 1470–71, probably by the master mason William Orchard. It is a Grade I listed building. The tower acquired its name centuries later, after the poet Alexander Pope stayed here in 1717–18 and used its upper room to translate the fifth volume of Homer's Iliad. In the summer of 1718 he also wrote the epitaph to a young couple, John Hewett and Sarah Drew, who were struck by lightning and killed in the parish. The poem is carved on a stone monument on the outside of the south wall of the nave of St Michael's parish church.

== Parish church ==
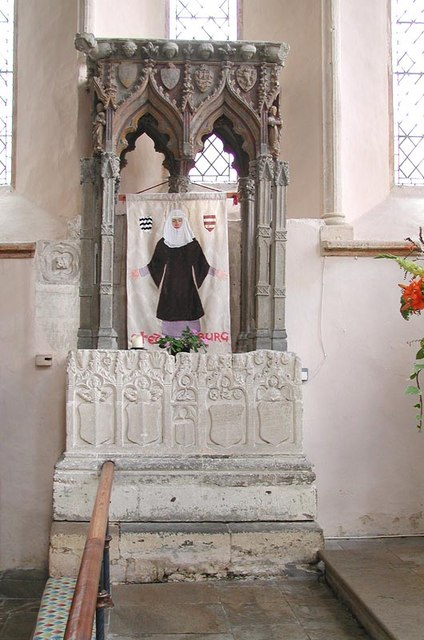
Shrine of St Edburg in St Michael's parish church, salvaged from Bicester Priory

The earliest known record of the Church of England parish church of Saint Michael dates from 1135, and the Norman nave and lower parts of the bell tower are certainly 12th century. In the 13th century the chancel, chancel arch and tower arches were rebuilt and the transepts and stair turret were added.

In the 15th century the upper part of the belltower was completed, the Perpendicular Gothic west window of the nave and north and south windows of the transepts were inserted and the pitch of the roof was lowered. St Michael's is a Grade I listed building. The central tower has a ring of six bells. Michael Darbie, an itinerant bellfounder, cast the second, third, fourth and fifth bells in 1656, which was during the Commonwealth of England. Richard Keene of Woodstock cast the tenor bell in 1686. Abraham II Rudhall of Gloucester cast the treble bell in 1722.

In the chancel is the Decorated Gothic late 13th- or early 14th-century shrine of St Edburg of Bicester. It was at the Augustinian priory at Bicester until 1536, when the priory was dissolved. Sir James Harcourt had the shrine salvaged and moved to St Michael's. The Harcourt chapel was added on the south side of the chancel, possibly by William Orchard. It includes the medieval tombs of Sir Thomas Harcourt and his wife, Lady Maud, daughter of Lord Grey of Rotherfield. St Michael's parish is part of the Benefice of Lower Windrush, along with the parishes of Northmoor, Standlake and Yelford.

== RAF Stanton Harcourt ==
In the Second World War there was a Royal Air Force airfield at Stanton Harcourt. It is notable for having been a transit point for Winston Churchill and for being a starting point for a bomber raid on the German battleship Scharnhorst. The runways are now gone, but some of the original buildings remain incorporated into a housing development.

== Amenities ==
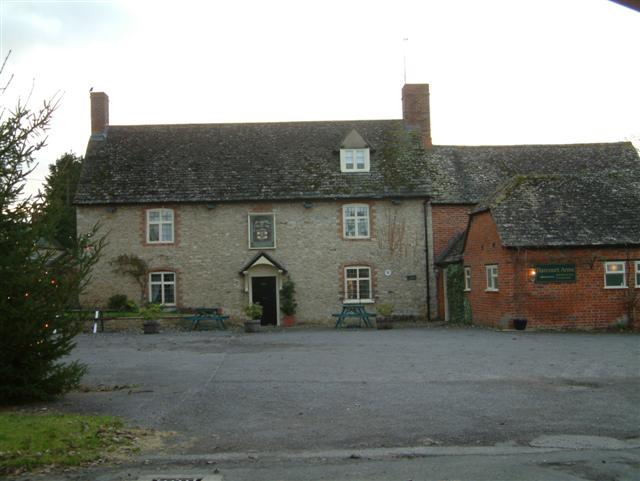
The Harcourt Arms

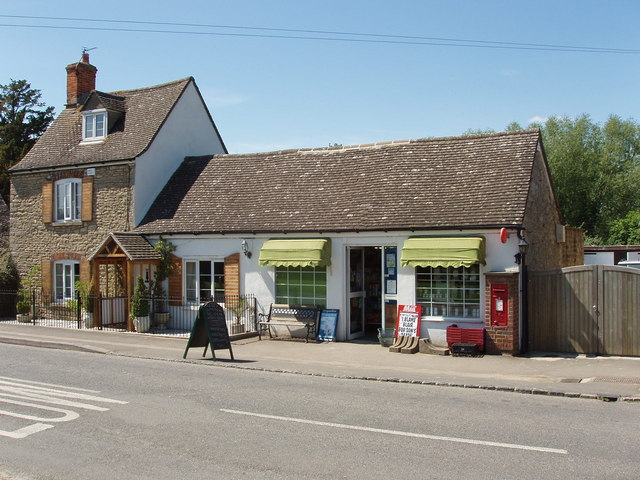
Former village shop and sub-post office

Stanton Harcourt has a 17th-century pub, The Harcourt Arms. It had another pub, the Fox, but it is now a private home. The parish council owns Fox Field behind it and has renamed it the Jubilee Field, with installed play equipment. Trees and hedging have been provided by the Woodland Trust and planted by volunteers. The village has a primary school. Stanton Harcourt has a history of Morris dancing since the 19th century. Following a lapse, the traditional dances have been revived by the Icknield Morris and Trigg Morris, and continue today.

First & Last Mile buses provide a daytime bus service 418 giving a two-hourly service to Standlake, Eynsham, Freeland, and Long Hanborough.

== Notable people ==
- Edward Venables-Vernon-Harcourt, who was Archbishop of York 1807–47, is buried here.

== Sources and further reading ==
1. Barclay, Gill; Gray, Margaret; Lambrick, George (1995). Excavations at the Devil's Quoits, Stanton Harcourt. Thames Valley Landscape Series. Vol. 5. Oxford: Oxford University School of Archaeology. ISBN 0-947816-84-4.
2. Buckingham, C; Roe, D; Scott, K (1996). "A preliminary report on the Stanton Harcourt Channel Deposits (Oxfordshire, England)". Journal of Quaternary Science. 11 (5). doi:10.1002/(SICI)1099-1417(199609/10)11:5<397::AID-JQS261>3.0.CO;2-M.
3. Crossley, Alan; Elrington, C.R. (eds.); Baggs, A.P.; Blair, W.J.; Chance, Eleanor; Colvin, Christina; Cooper, Janet; Day, C.J.; Selwyn, Nesta; Townley, Simon C. (1990). A History of the County of Oxford. Victoria County History. Vol. 12: Wootton Hundred (South) including Woodstock. London: Oxford University Press for the Institute of Historical Research. pp. 267–296. ISBN 978-0-19722-774-9.
4. Lambrick, George; Allen, Tim (2004). Gravelly Guy: Excavations at Stanton Harcourt. Thames Valley Landscape Series. Vol. 21. Oxford: Oxford University School of Archaeology. ISBN 0-947816-66-6.
5. McGavin, Neil; Symonds, Robin P; Harman, Mary (1980). "A Roman Cemetery and Trackway at Stanton Harcourt" (PDF). Oxoniensia. XLV. Oxfordshire Architectural and Historical Society: 112–123.
6. Mills, A.D.; Room, A. (2003). A Dictionary of British Place-Names. Oxford: Oxford University Press. ISBN 0-19-852758-6.
7. Sherwood, Jennifer; Pevsner, Nikolaus (1974). Oxfordshire. The Buildings of England. Harmondsworth: Penguin Books. pp. 778–784. ISBN 0-14-071045-0.
