= Church of the Holy Trinity, Newton St Loe =

Church in Somerset, England

Church of the Holy Trinity
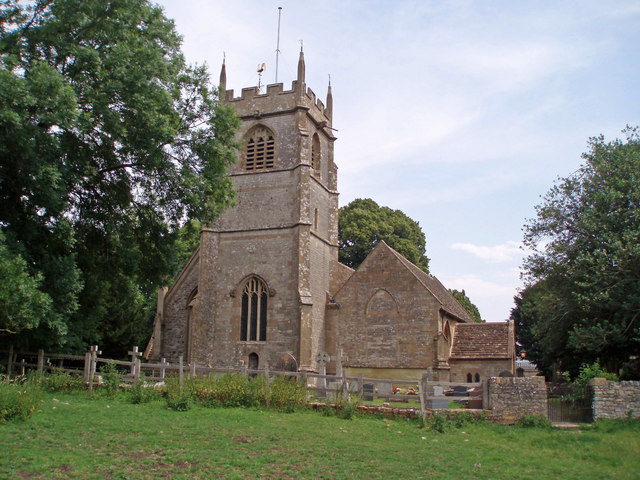

- Location within Somerset
- 51°22′56″N 2°25′51″W
- Location: Newton St Loe, Somerset, England

History
- Built: 14th century

Listed Building – Grade II*
- Designated: 1 February 1956
- Reference no.: 1129501

The Anglican Church of the Holy Trinity in Newton St Loe within the English county of Somerset is a Grade II* listed building.

A church has stood on the site, close to Newton St Loe Castle and Newton Park, since the 11th century, however the current stone building was constructed in the 14th with the tower being added in the 15th. It was restored in 1857. The bell tower has a clock face with only one hand.

== History ==
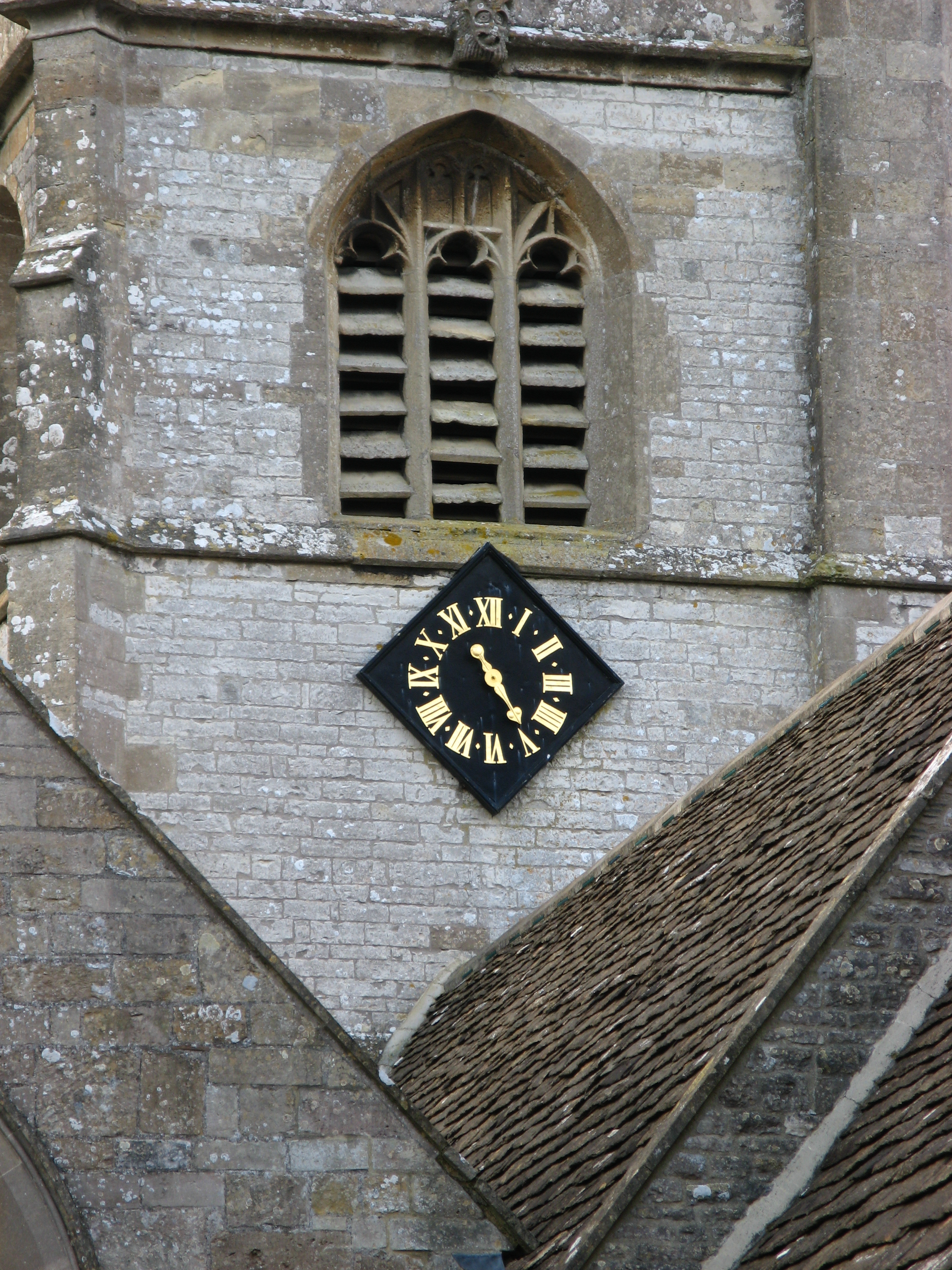
The one handed clock on the tower

A church stood on the site during the 11th century and was mentioned in the Domesday Book. The current building is from the 14th century. The tower was added in the 15th century.

In 1857 the church was restored and the north aisle was added by Charles Edward Davis who later became the Bath City Architect. The work was funded by William Gore-Langton.

It is part of the Benefice of Saltford, Corston and Newton St Loe, and is in the Diocese of Bath & Wells (in the Archdiocese of Canterbury) and the Deanery of Chew Magna.

== Architecture ==
The stone building has north and south aisles, nave, chancel, west tower and organ chamber covered with a slate roof.

It has a three-stage west tower, supported by diagonal buttresses. The tower is 61 feet (19 m) tall. On the tower is a clock face with a single hand. It contains six bells these were recast from the original five by Thomas Bilbie of the Bilbie family of Chew Stoke in 1741. The tower is separated from the nave by a wooden screen erected in 1909.

== Interior ==
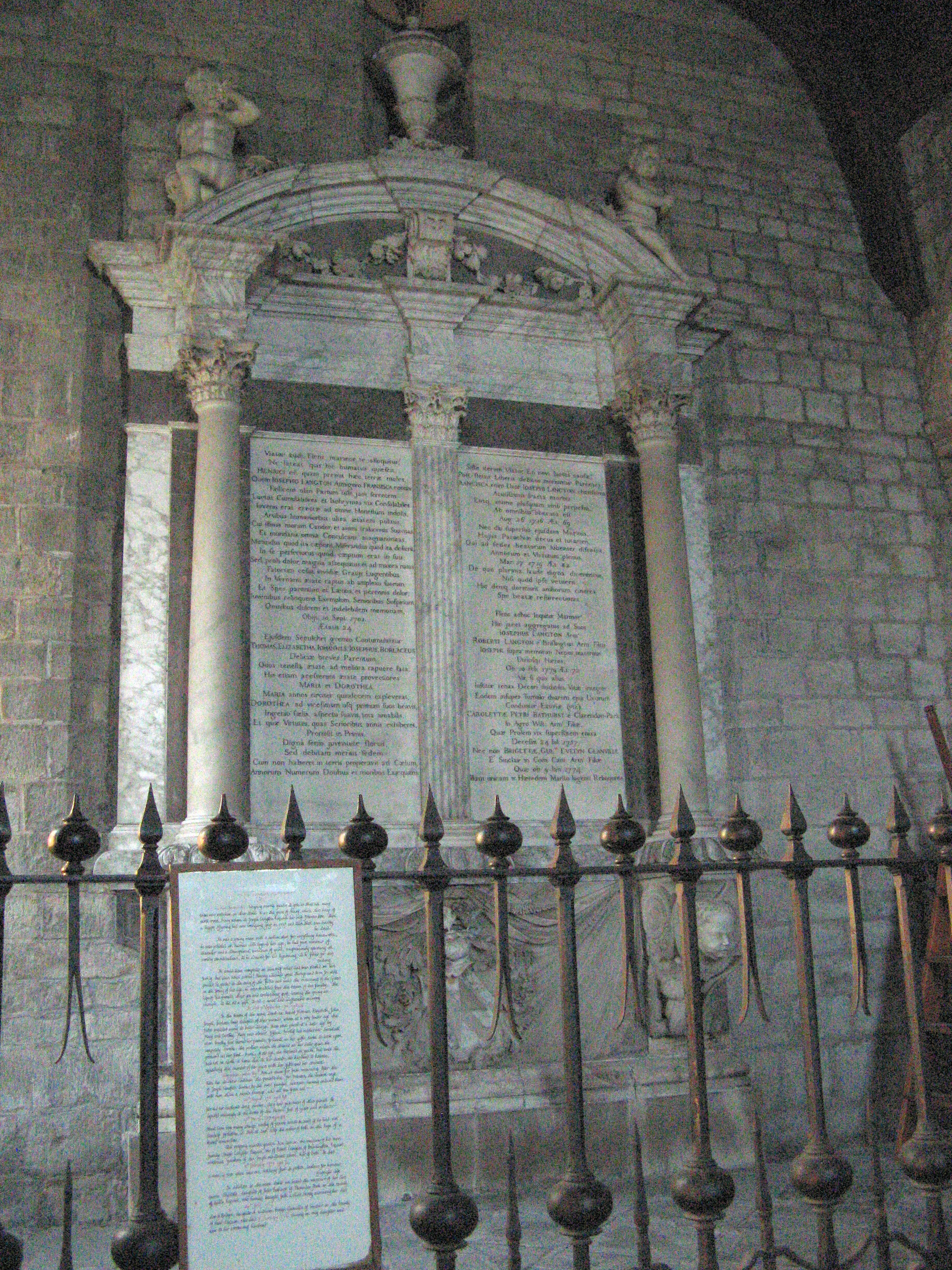
Tomb of Joseph Langton

Most of the interior fittings, including the font, pews, pulpit and screen are from the 1857 restoration; however some of the monuments are considerably older. These include the marble tomb of Joseph Langton who died in 1701. A cast-iron railing surrounds the vault which also has an inscription on marble commemorating his seven children who all died prematurely.

The organ was installed in 1879.

== Notable interments ==
- Hugh Warburton

== See also ==
- List of ecclesiastical parishes in the Diocese of Bath and Wells
