= St Loe =

St Loe is an English surname. A French family who took their name from Saint-Lô in Normandy came to England in the Norman Conquest, and later held the manor of Newton in Somerset, now called Newton St Loe, where they built a fortified house called Newton St Loe Castle.

Notable people named St Loe or St Lo include:

- Edward St. Loe (died 1578), English landowner, MP for Bath and for Downton
- Elizabeth St Loe (née Hardwick; c.1521–1608), known as Bess of Hardwick, English noblewoman and businesswoman, married for a time to Sir William St Loe
- George St Lo (sometimes written as St Loe; 1655–1718), British naval officer and politician
- Sir William St Loe (1518–1565), English soldier, politician and courtier
