= Tracey Corderoy =

British children's writer (born 1965)

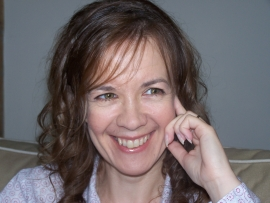
- Born: Tracey Hopkins; 12 April 1965 (age 61); Neath, West Glamorgan, Wales
- Education: Bath Spa University (B.E.)
- Occupation: Children's writer
- Spouse: Mark (1987–present)
- Children: 2
- Writing career
- Genre: Children's literature
- Website: www.traceycorderoy.com

Tracey Corderoy (born 12 April 1965) is a British children's writer. She has published 76 books since 2010, and works with publishers; Little Tiger Press, Nosy Crow, Scholastic Children's Books, Alison Green Books, Meadowside Children's Book, Egmont and Stripes.

== Awards ==
- Blast Off - Key Stage 1 Teach Primary Award 2022
- Shifty McGifty and Slippery Sam - Santa's Stolen Sleigh selected as one of the top 42 books for children in 2021
- Winner of the Hounslow Junior Book Award 2014 for Baddies Beasties and a Sprinkling of Crumbs (published by Stripes).
- Winner of the Hillingdon Picture Book of the Year in 2011 for her book The Grunt and The Grouch (published by Little Tiger Press).
- Shortlisted for the second year running for the 2012 Hillingdon Picture Book of the Year for her picture book Hubble Bubble Granny Trouble (published by Nosy Crow).
- Shortlisted for the 2012 Independent Booksellers Week Award for her picture book, Never Say No to a Princess! (published by Alison Green Books).
- Nominated for the 2012 People's Book Prize for her picture book, Whizz Pop, Granny STOP! (published by Nosy Crow).

== Background ==
Corderoy grew up in Sandfields, Port Talbot in South Wales.

When Corderoy was eighteen she moved to Bath to study at Bath College of Higher Education (later known as Bath Spa University) to be a primary school teacher, graduating in 1987. After teaching positions in Swindon and Cirencester, she left the teaching profession to start a family.

Several years later, Corderoy started working with children in primary schools; where she implemented literacy programmes and re-integrated children returning to school following periods of long-term illness. It was during this time that she became passionate about writing for children – convinced that language, expressed through wonderful literature, is the key that stimulates learning and imagination.

== Books ==
=== Picture books ===
- Miss Dotty's Potty School (Illustrator – Ali Pye), (Little Tiger Press 2023) (ISBN 9781801044042)
- Shifty McGifty and Slippery Sam - Pirates Ahoy! (Illustrator – Steven Lenton), (Nosy Crow 2022) (ISBN 978-1839945823)
- I Love School! (Illustrator – Tim Warnes), (Little Tiger 2020) (ISBN 978-1680102307)
- Shifty McGifty and Slippery Sam - Santa's Stolen Sleigh (Illustrator – Steven Lenton), (Nosy Crow 2021) (ISBN 978-1788007771)
- I Love School! (Illustrator – Tim Warnes), (Little Tiger Press 2020) (ISBN 978-1680102307)
- It's only one! (Illustrator – Tony Neal), (Little Tiger Press 2020) (ISBN 978-1788816816)
- Impossible! (Illustrator – Tony Neal), (Little Tiger Press 2020) (ISBN 978-1788815864)
- Mouse's Night Before Christmas (Illustrator – Sarah Massini), (Nosy Crow 2019) (ISBN 978-1788005449)
- The Boy and the Bear (Illustrator – Sarah Massini), (Nosy Crow 2019) (ISBN 978-1788005401)
- The One Stop Story Shop (Illustrator – Tony Neal), (Little Tiger Press 2019) (ISBN 978-1788811002)
- Sneaky Beak (Illustrator – Tony Neal), (Little Tiger Press 2019) (ISBN 978-1788813969)
- The Christmas Extravaganza Hotel (Illustrator – Tony Neal), (Little Tiger Press 2018) (ISBN 978-1-68010-102-7)
- Shifty McGifty and Slippery Sam - The Missing Masterpiece (Illustrator – Steven Lenton), (Nosy Crow 2018) (ISBN 978-0857639752)
- The Boy and the Bear (Illustrator – Sarah Massini), (Nosy Crow 2018) (ISBN 978-1788000765)
- It's Christmas! (Illustrator – Tim Warnes), (Little Tiger Press 2017) (ISBN 978-1848696716)
- Shifty McGifty and Slippery Sam - The Diamond Chase (Illustrator – Steven Lenton), (Nosy Crow 2016) (ISBN 978-0857636690)
- Shifty McGifty and Slippery Sam - The Cat Burglar (Illustrator – Steven Lenton), (Nosy Crow 2015) (ISBN 978-0857634825)
- Fairy Tale Pets (Illustrator – Jorge Martín), (Little Tiger Press 2017) (ISBN 978-1848694415)
- Squish Squash Squeeze! (Illustrator – Jane Chapman), (Little Tiger Press 2016) (ISBN 978-1848691896)
- Now! (Illustrator – Tim Warnes), (Little Tiger Press 2015) (ISBN 978-1848691346)
- Hubble Bubble, Granny Trouble (Illustrator – Joe Berger), (Nosy Crow 2011) (ISBN 978-0857630285)
- More! (Illustrator – Tim Warnes), (Little Tiger Press 2015) (ISBN 978-1848691346)
- No! (Illustrator – Tim Warnes), (Little Tiger Press 2013) (ISBN 978-1848956520)
- Why! (Illustrator – Tim Warnes), (Little Tiger Press 2013) (ISBN 978-1848956520)
- Spells-A-Popping! Granny's Shopping! (Illustrator – Joe Berger), (Nosy Crow 2013) (ISBN 978-0-85763-221-0)
- Just Right For Two (Illustrator – Ros Beardshaw), (Nosy Crow 2013) (ISBN 978-0-85763-176-3)
- The Very Messy Mermaid (Illustrator – Kate Leake), (Alison Green Books 2013) (ISBN 978-1-4071-3542-7)
- No! (Illustrator – Tim Warnes), (Little Tiger Press 2013) (ISBN 978-1-84895-652-0)
- Shifty McGifty and Slippery Sam (Illustrator – Steven Lenton), (Nosy Crow 2013) (ISBN 978-0-85763-146-6)
- I Want My Mummy! (Illustrator – Alison Edgson), (Little Tiger Press 2013) (ISBN 978-1-84895-537-0)
- Boo! (Illustrator – Caroline Pedler), (Little Tiger Press 2013) (ISBN 978-1-84895-539-4)
- A Flower in the Snow (Illustrator – Sophie Allsopp), (Egmont 2012) (ISBN 978-1-4052-4945-4)
- Wakey Wakey, Big Brown Bear ! (Illustrator – Rachel Swirles), (Meadowside 2012) (ISBN 978-1-84539-612-1)
- Whizz, Pop, Granny, Stop! (Illustrator – Joe Berger), (Nosy Crow 2012) (ISBN 978-0-85763-131-2)
- It's Mine! (Illustrator – Caroline Peddler), (Little Tiger Press 2012) (ISBN 978-1-56148-766-0)
- Monty and Milli (Illustrator – Tim Warnes), (Little Tiger Press 2012) (ISBN 978-1-84895-307-9)
- Frog and Mouse (Illustrator – Anna Popescu), (Meadowside Children's Books 2012) (ISBN 978-1-84539-503-2)
- Never say NO to a Princess! (Illustrator – Kate Leake), (Alison Green Books 2012) (ISBN 978-1-4071-1558-0)
- Just One More! (Illustrator – Alison Edgson), (Little Tiger Press 2012)(ISBN 978-1-84895-312-3)
- Brave Little Penguin... (Illustrator – Gavin Scott) (Little Tiger Press 2011) (ISBN 978-1-84895-243-0)
- Hubble Bubble, Granny Trouble! (Illustrator – Joe Berger), (Nosy Crow 2011) (ISBN 978-0-85763-028-5)
- It's Potty Time! (Illustrator – Caroline Pedler), (Little Tiger Press 2011) (ISBN 978-1-84895-138-9)
- Oh Dylan! (Illustrator – Tina Macnaughton), (Little Tiger Press 2011) (ISBN 978-1-84895-137-2)
- Star Friends (Illustrator – Alison Edgson), (Little Tiger Press 2010) (ISBN 978-1-84895-096-2)
- The Grunt and The Grouch (Illustrator – Lee Wildish), (Little Tiger Press 2010) (ISBN 978-1-84895-051-1)
- The Little White Owl (Illustrator – Jane Chapman), (Little Tiger Press 2010) (ISBN 978-1-84895-086-3)
- The Magic Christmas Star (Illustrator – Simon Taylor-Kielty), (Hallmark 2008)

=== Young fiction ===
- The Story Shop Series (Little Tiger Press)
  - The Story Shop: Dino Danger! (2023) (ISBN 978-1788953320)
  - The Story Shop: Anchors Away! (2022) (ISBN 978-1788953269)
  - The Story Shop: Blast Off! (2022) (ISBN 978-1788953252)
- Seaview Stables Series (Simon & Schuster)
  - The Pony With No Name (2018) (ISBN 978-1788001526)
  - The Mystery at Stormy Point (2019) (ISBN 978-1471170430)
  - Snowflakes, Silver and Secrets (2019) (ISBN 978-1471170454)
- Shifty McGifty and Slippery Sam Series (Nosy Crow)
  - The Spooky School (2016) (ISBN 978-0857637017)
  - The Aliens Are Coming! (2019) (ISBN 978-1788001526)
  - Jingle Bells (2017) (ISBN 978-0857639622)
  - Up, Up and Away! (2017) (ISBN 978-0857638489)
- Hubble Bubble Series (Nosy Crow)
  - The Glorious Granny Bake Off (2013) (ISBN 978-0-85763-222-7)
  - The Pesky Pirate Prank! (2014) (ISBN 978-0857632241)
  - The Messy Monkey Business! (2015) (ISBN 978-0857635297)
  - The Winter Wonderland! (2015) (ISBN 978-0857634948)
  - The Super-Spooky Fright Night! (2014) (ISBN 978-0857633170)
- The Willow Valley Series (Scholastic)
  - One Snowy Day (2012) (ISBN 978-1-4071-3483-3)
  - Birthday Fun (2012) (ISBN 978-1-4071-2474-2)
  - Spooky Sleepover (2012) (ISBN 978-1-4071-2475-9)
  - The Big Bike Race (2012) (ISBN 978-1-4071-2476-6)
  - Hide and Seek (2012) (ISBN 978-1-4071-2477-3)
  - A Seaside Rescue (2013) (ISBN 978-1-4071-3489-5)
  - Toffee Apple Night (2013) (ISBN 978-1-4071-3761-2)
  - New Friends (2014) (ISBN 978-1407138855)
  - The Great Egg Hunt (2014) (ISBN 978-1407137629)
- The Grunt and The Grouch Series (Little Tiger Press)
  - Pick 'n' Mix! (2010) (ISBN 978-1-84715-122-3)
  - Freaky Funfair! (2010) (ISBN 978-1-84715-161-2)
  - Beastly Feast! (2010) (ISBN 978-1-84715-123-0)
  - Big Splash! (2010) (ISBN 978-1-84715-134-6)
- Anthologies (Stripes Publishing)
  - On a Snowy Night (2015) (ISBN 978-1847156426)
  - Winter Wonderland (2014) (ISBN 978-1847154606)

=== Fiction 8yr+ ===
- The Crumbs Detective Series ( Stripes )
  - Monsters, Mayhem and a Sprinkling of Crumbs! (2013) (ISBN 978-1-84715-380-7)
  - Baddies, Beasties and a Sprinkling of Crumbs! (2013) (ISBN 978-1-84715-245-9)

=== Audio books ===
- Willow Valley: Birthday Fun & Spooky Sleepover (Unabridged) (AudiGo 2012) (ASIN: B00A2735EE)
- Willow Valley: The Big Bike Race & Hide and Seek (Unabridged) (AudiGo 2012) (ASIN: B00A2732Z6)
