= UK Songwriting Festival =

The UK Songwriting Festival is a six-day residential event, held at Bath Spa University every August. It was launched in 2004 as part of a National Teaching Fellowship project by Joe Bennett. It is supported with contributors from the British Academy of Composers and Songwriters.
