= Corston, Somerset =

Village in Somerset, England

Coordinates: 51.3863°N 2.4404°W

Corston
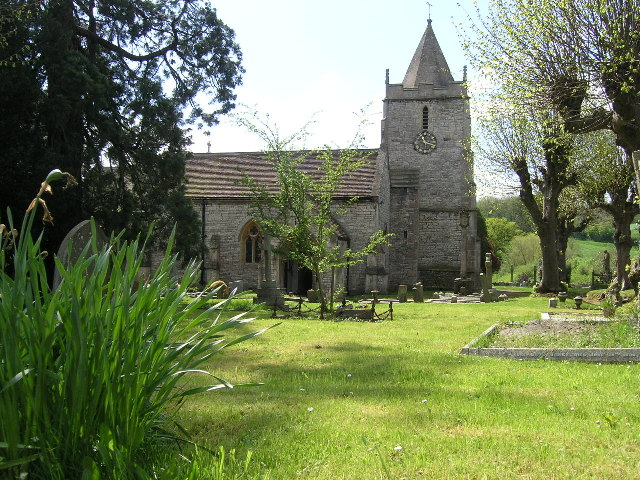
- All Saints Church

- Location within Somerset
- Population: 494 (2011)
- OS grid reference: ST694653
- Civil parish: Corston
- Unitary authority: Bath and North East Somerset
- Ceremonial county: Somerset
- Region: South West
- Country: England
- Sovereign state: United Kingdom
- Post town: BATH
- Postcode district: BA2
- Dialling code: 01225
- Police: Avon and Somerset
- Fire: Avon
- Ambulance: South Western
- UK Parliament: North East Somerset and Hanham

Corston is a small village and civil parish close to the River Avon and situated on the A39 road in the Bath and North East Somerset unitary authority, Somerset, England. The parish has a population of 494.

== History ==
The parish of Corston was part of the Wellow Hundred. The manor of Corston was included in the jointure lands of Anne of Denmark.

== Governance ==
The parish council has responsibility for local issues, including setting an annual precept (local rate) to cover the council's operating costs and producing annual accounts for public scrutiny. The parish council evaluates local planning applications and works with the local police, district council officers, and neighbourhood watch groups on matters of crime, security, and traffic. The parish council's role also includes initiating projects for the maintenance and repair of parish facilities, such as the village hall or community centre, playing fields and playgrounds, as well as consulting with the district council on the maintenance, repair, and improvement of highways, drainage, footpaths, public transport, and street cleaning. Conservation matters (including trees and listed buildings) and environmental issues are also of interest to the council.

The parish falls within the unitary authority of Bath and North East Somerset which was created in 1996, as established by the Local Government Act 1992. It provides a single tier of local government with responsibility for almost all local government functions within its area including local planning and building control, local roads, council housing, environmental health, markets and fairs, refuse collection, recycling, cemeteries, crematoria, leisure services, parks, and tourism. It is also responsible for education, social services, libraries, main roads, public transport, trading standards, waste disposal and strategic planning, although fire, police and ambulance services are provided jointly with other authorities through the Avon Fire and Rescue Service, Avon and Somerset Constabulary and the Great Western Ambulance Service.

Bath and North East Somerset's area covers part of the ceremonial county of Somerset but it is administered independently of the non-metropolitan county. Its administrative headquarters are in Bath. Between 1 April 1974 and 1 April 1996, the parish was in the District of Wansdyke within the County of Avon. Before 1974 it was part of Bathavon Rural District.

The parish is represented in the House of Commons of the Parliament of the United Kingdom as part of North East Somerset and Hanham. It elects one member of parliament (MP) by the first past the post system of election. It was also part of the South West England constituency of the European Parliament prior to Britain leaving the European Union in January 2020, which elected seven MEPs using the d'Hondt method of party-list proportional representation.

== Religious sites ==
All Saints' Church dates from the 12th century and is a grade II listed building. The bells in its bell tower are regularly utilized for change ringing.

It is part of the Benefice of Saltford, Corston and Newton St Loe, and is in the Diocese of Bath & Wells (in the Archdiocese of Canterbury) and the Deanery of Chew Magna.

The village was also home to a convent. The Poor Servants of the Mother of God have provided care services from the property since 1940, until it was sold to Cedar Care

== Transport ==
Bus services connect Corston with Bath, Keynsham and Bristol. There are regular bus services between Bath and the nearby Newton Park campus of Bath Spa University. The Saltford Environment Group is campaigning to reopen the nearby Saltford railway station on the Bath–Bristol line, which was closed in 1970.
