= Anti-elitism =

Attitude against individuals and groups perceived as elite

Anti-elitism is a term used to describe attitudes of disregard, resentment, or in extreme cases hate for those in power, perceived as an "elite".

Anti-elitists would often describe the government(s), corporations or ruling class as either corrupt or ignoring the needs of the people. They often seek either to replace wealthy or privileged members of society, or even to eliminate excess wealth or privilege altogether. Anti-elitism is a common theme throughout history, from socio-politics to literary contributions and philosophies.

In anti-elitist speech, the terms "elitism" or "elitist" can be used pejoratively to characterize practices which discriminate on the basis of ability or attributes. In politics, anti-elitism can manifest itself as populism.

== Social and political movements ==
Those who find themselves oppressed by their ruling body often hold disdain towards the government or existing social order for various injustices or inequalities. Others may hold envy for those in power, or even wish for said power to not exist. Depending upon the extent of perceived injustices, as well as the tolerance of the people to accept their conditions, anti-elitism may erupt into mass actions such as, protest, rebellion, revolution, or anomie.

Historically, anti-elitist political personalities have often been accused of being demagogues or populists, either on the Left or Right of the political spectrum.

Hitler's "original targets, for example, weren't the impoverished Jews of Eastern Europe, who suffered immeasurably during the Holocaust. It was the class of literate, educated, and established Jews in urban centres — the elites of their place and time.", argues Adam Gopnik, from The New Yorker. More recently, Donald Trump's political project has been described as that of an "anti-elite elite"; as were various political French and British movements.

Political movements and groups that present anti-elitist features have been identified in various countries, including Turkey, the United States, France, Greece, Poland, and Ukraine.

== In the media ==
According to a 2021 article by Elaine Glaser in the Political Quarterly, "Anti-elitism is now ubiquitous even in mainstream broadsheet commentary. Because it failed to predict the financial crash and the Brexit vote, the political and journalistic 'establishment' has internalised the charge of fatal complacency, and proponents of austerity have pointed to the poshness of much British arts and culture (itself the product of neoliberal policies) to cast them as luxuries we cannot afford."

== See also ==
- Elitism
- Populism
- Reverse snobbery
- Anti-intellectualism
- Common man
