= Combe Hay Locks =

Lock flight in Somerset, England

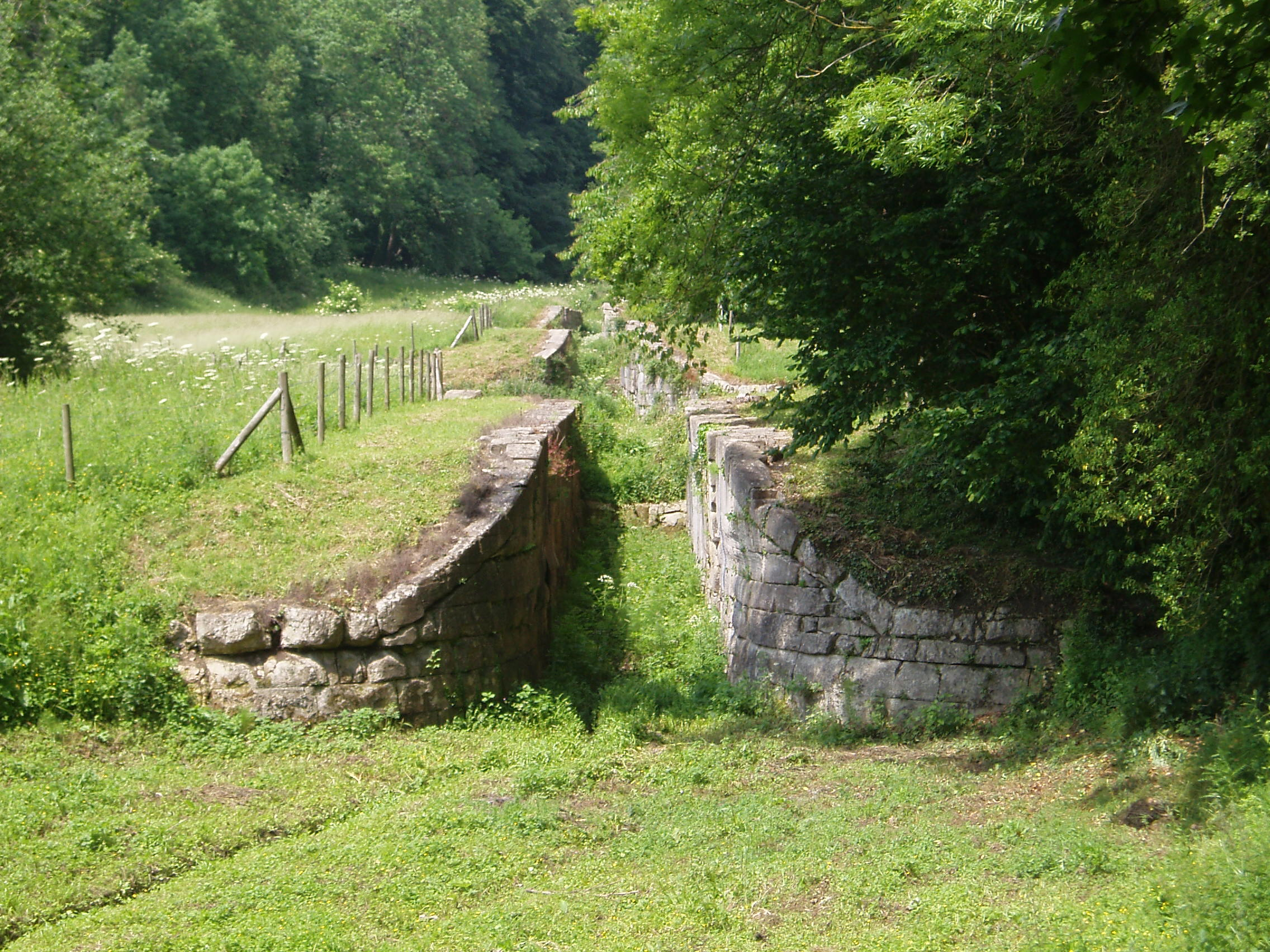
- The chambers of locks 14, 13 and 12
- 51.3443°N 2.3702°W
- Waterway: Somerset Coal Canal
- Country: United Kingdom
- County: Somerset
- Operation: Manual
- First built: 1805
- Length: 1.6 miles (2.6 km)
- Width: 7 feet (2.1 m)
- Fall: 134 feet (41 m)
- Distance to Kennet and Avon Canal: 3.5 miles (5.6 km)
- Distance to Timsbury Basin: 6.25 miles (10.06 km)

The Combe Hay Locks is a derelict flight of locks on the Somerset Coal Canal near Combe Hay, Somerset, England. Twenty two locks raised the canal 134 feet (41 m) over approximately 1.6 miles (2.6 km). The lock flight was predated in the immediate area by two other methods of canal lifts—first by a series of caisson locks, then by an inclined plane. The lock flight opened in 1805, and was in operation until 1899.

== History ==
The route of the Somerset Coal Canal, after leaving its junction with the Kennet and Avon Canal at Limpley Stoke, roughly parallels that of the Midford Brook. At Midford, the canal followed the valley of the Cam Brook. At Combe Hay, the steep valley required the canal to climb a significant height—134 feet (41 m)—over a distance of 1.6 miles (2.6 km).

=== Caisson locks ===
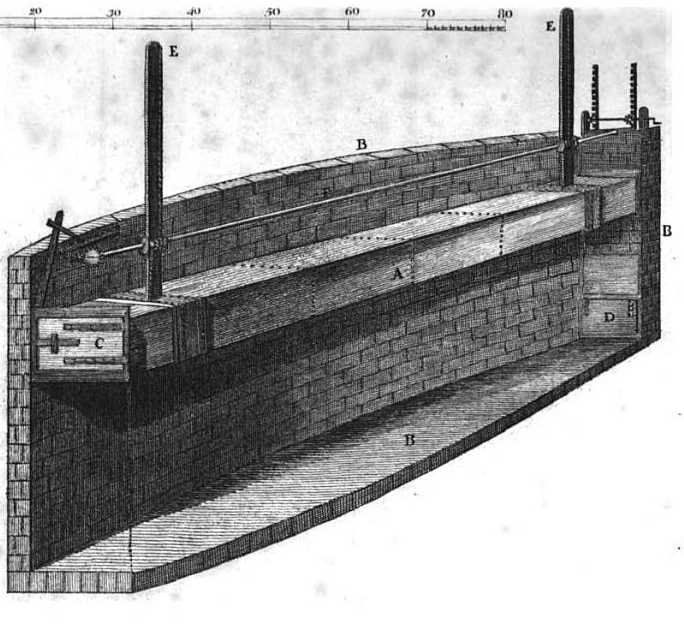
John Billingsley's engraving of the caisson lock at Combe Hay

The first proposed solution to overcoming the gradient was by the use of three caisson locks. Adverts were printed in Bath periodicals in January 1796 to recruit stonemasons for building the locks.

Construction of the first caisson lock began in 1796. The masonry chamber, known as the cistern, was 81 feet (25 m) long and 20 feet (6.1 m) at its widest, and had a depth of 61 feet 6 inches (18.75 m). The wooden caisson—the moving box within the cistern—was 80 feet (24 m) long, 10 feet 6 inches (3.20 m) wide and 11 feet 6 inches (3.51 m) tall. Each of the three caisson locks was planned to provide a lift of 46 feet (14 m).

Trials of this first lock took place between November 1797 and June 1798. These showed that it could be traversed in 7 minutes; on 9 June 1798, a reporter for the Bath Herald wrote that:

It is a pleasure to reflect that the hydrostatical contrivance for conveying of boats from upper to lower levels and vice versa, is completed, and may now be esteemed one of the greatest discoveries of the age; every scrupulous objection to the practability of its operation being removed.

The same publication wrote the following year that the system was so simple that a boat could traverse the caisson in just 10 minutes under the operation of a 12-year-old boy. The report identified problems with the caisson's ability to remain watertight, and hypothesized that the only solution would be to rebuild the chamber. A second caisson was started and construction of the third was probably never begun. Surveyor William Smith visited the site at least twice, in 1798 and 1799. The geology of the area, with substantial deposits of fuller's earth, proved unsuitable for the caisson chambers—in May 1799 the masonry of the lock chamber bulged under pressure and the caisson was immovable. Repairs were quoted at £16,000—equivalent to £1,985,594 in 2023—which was in addition to the £75,167 (£9,328,196) already invested in the caisson project. In January 1800, the caissons were abandoned and an alternative sought.

In May 1801, having moved to Bath upon her father's retirement, Jane Austen wrote to her sister Cassandra about plans with her uncle to "take the long-planned walk to the Cassoon"; the short trip was a popular excursion at the time. The same year, Richard Warner wrote of the then-state of the caisson lock in his Excursions from Bath:

The deviation of a few hundred yards from the road to Combhay, leads us to the hydrostatical lock, called the caisson, the bason of which now alone remains [...] the machine was consigned to destruction, but not to oblivion, since it will ever remain a memorable proof of the superior mechanical abilities of its very ingenious inventor

The precise location of the caisson locks (or their intended location) is in doubt. General consensus is that the completed caisson lock was accessed east of the basin near Caisson House. The second caisson was likely a short distance to the east, with the third a considerable distance downstream (near the site of Locks 19 and 20).

=== Inclined plane ===
The canal company investigated alternatives to the caisson locks, and a lock flight was chosen as the appropriate method. To achieve this, in June 1800 the company made the decision to build a temporary inclined plane to transfer cargo, although this method for climbing the hill proved slow. The inclined plane was only ever intended to avoid further delays to the canal's construction, and would only be in operation while the flight of locks was built. To reduce the length (and gradient) of the inclined plane, three pound locks were built to the east of Combe Hay. The inclined plane began operation in November 1801.

=== Lock flight ===
In addition to the three extant locks below the inclined plane, a further 19 locks were built to supersede the plane. Fundraising began in February 1800, initially via shareholder donations totalling £20,000 (equivalent to £2,039,673 in 2023). In 1802, a fund established by the canal company along with the proprietors of the Wilts and Berks and Kennet and Avon canals sought to raise a further £45,000 (equivalent to £5,075,035 in 2023).

Construction began on the flight in November 1802, with the first lock (lock 19) being completed in June 1804. During the works, the caisson lock was demolished and it is likely that the significant amount of masonry was reclaimed for use on the lock flight as coping stones and possibly on the later building of Caisson House.

The engineer of the flight was probably William Bennet. The flight of 22 locks fully opened in April 1805. These all had the same specification—a rise of approximately 6 feet (1.8 m), a beam of 7 feet (2.1 m), and a length to fit a 70-foot (21 m) narrowboat. These locks were half as wide as those on the connecting Kennet and Avon Canal, thus two vessels from the Somerset Coal Canal could fit side by side in the broad Kennet and Avon locks.

To achieve the climb in the available area, the lock flight diverted north of the caisson and inclined plane routes, before turning 170° and rejoining the route to the south. This hairpin bend became known as the "Bull's Nose". Speed of traversing the flight was a priority, and the lock paddles and culverts were made as large as practicable to empty and fill the locks as quickly as possible. To avoid damage to the locks caused by carelessness, wrought iron plates and cast iron slabs were installed on the lock flight. In 1805, the locks opened.

=== Decline ===
In 1881, the Camerton Branch of the Bristol and North Somerset Railway opened through the Cam valley, crossing the lock flight at lock 16. Like many canals, the arrival of rail transport began the decline of the waterway's use. The canal was put up for sale in 1894. The backpumps on the flight ceased operation in November 1898; transport would continue to operate until August 1899 when the water levels became insufficient for navigation.

== Legacy ==
After the abandonment of the canal in 1899, the flight was left to become derelict. The chamber of lock 16, beneath a railway arch of the Camerton railway branch, was infilled.

In 1982, 10 of the extant locks—those in the parish of Combe Hay (Note: the civil parish (CP) boundary between Combe Hay and South Stoke follows the flight as it rises from Lock 16 to the Bull's Nose; Locks 1–10 are therefore in Combe Hay CP and Locks 11–22 are in South Stoke CP)—were given Grade II listed status. The survey for the listing found that the locks' ashlar retaining walls survive to a height of 10 to 12 feet (3.0 to 3.7 m), and some of the lower lock gates were still in situ. In 1984, a further five locks of the flight—those in South Stoke parish—were also listed as Grade II. This survey found similar survival of the retaining walls, although it described some as being in a poor condition. A milestone is extant near Lock 4, although its cast iron plaque (reading "4/MILES") is missing. It was identified that four locks in the 1805 flight of 19 had been buried or otherwise destroyed.

A building near the summit of the flight, Caisson House, is named for its proximity to the first caisson lock. The building is likely a former terrace of cottages built for the canal company in the 1830s (and therefore the removal of the caisson lock predates the cottages' construction).

=== Restoration ===
General restoration work began on the lower lock flight (below the Bull's Nose) in 2000. This work was expanded to cover the upper flight in 2011, as landowner permission needed to be sought. This work was undertaken alongside the Inland Waterways Association's Waterway Recovery Group.

== Locations ==
Feature	Coordinates	Status
Lock 1	51.340005°N 2.375833°W	Extant
Lock 2	51.339779°N 2.374577°W	Extant
Lock 3	51.340030°N 2.373713°W	Extant
Lock 4	51.340657°N 2.372686°W	Extant
Lock 5	51.341324°N 2.372289°W	Extant
Lock 6	51.342095°N 2.371101°W	Extant
Lock 7	51.342422°N 2.370514°W	Extant
Lock 8	51.342896°N 2.369334°W	Extant
Lock 9	51.343471°N 2.369441°W	Extant
Lock 10	51.344003°N 2.370496°W	Extant
Lock 11	51.344412°N 2.370614°W	Extant
Lock 12	51.344094°N 2.369670°W	Extant
Lock 13	51.343826°N 2.368688°W	Extant
Lock 14	51.343555°N 2.367693°W	Extant
Lock 15	51.343160°N 2.367006°W	Extant
Lock 16	51.342476°N 2.366732°W	Infilled
Lock 17	51.341851°N 2.366118°W	Infilled
Lock 18	51.341318°N 2.364664°W	Infilled
Lock 19	51.340737°N 2.363065°W	Partly infilled
Lock 20	51.340735°N 2.361297°W	Infilled
Lock 21	51.341045°N 2.359728°W	Partly infilled
Lock 22	51.341626°N 2.358357°W	Partly infilled

== Bibliography ==
- Torrens, Hugh (1975). "The Somersetshire Coal Canal Caisson Lock" (PDF). Bristol Industrial Archaeological Society Journal (8).
