= Frank Morgan (British academic) =

British academic (born 1952)

Professor Frank Morgan OBE (born 1952) is a British academic. He was the first Vice-Chancellor of Bath Spa University, and retired from that post as of December 2011. He was named an Officer of the OBE (OBE) for services to Higher Education in the 2012 New Year Honours.

While he was vice-chancellor, the Bath College of Higher Education (the university's former name) became a university college in 1999 and a university in 2005. He was vice-chancellor for 15 years, and worked at the university for 25 years.

Academic offices
Preceded by Brian Gomes da Costa (Director of the then Bath College of Higher Education)	Vice-Chancellor of Bath Spa University; 1997–2012	Succeeded by Professor Christina M. Slade
