= Lance Workman =

British psychologist

Lance Workman is a British psychologist whose specialisms include biological psychology, clinical psychology, and evolutionary psychology. He currently teaches on the psychology undergraduate programme at Bath Spa University. He is an Associate Fellow of and a Chartered Psychologist with the British Psychological Society.

== Education ==
He received an undergraduate degree in psychology and biology from Keele University and his doctorate from the University of Sussex.

== Works ==
His book written with Will Reader, Evolutionary Psychology: An Introduction, has been published in the UK, US, Canada, Australia and Europe and includes a French edition.

Research includes his finding that British robins have regional dialects, a number of research articles on Seasonal Affective Disorder and various works on the cerebral lateralisation of emotion.

He is consultant editor for the journal Animal Behaviour and is on the editorial board for The Psychologist.

== Appearances ==
On 13 April 2014, he appeared at the Leicester Square Theatre in London, as "the expert interviewee", with comedian Richard Herring in the show Richard Herring's Meaning of Life with comedian Richard Herring, discussing "Good and Evil".

== Books ==
Workman, L. and Reader, W. (2004) Evolutionary Psychology: An Introduction. Cambridge University Press, ISBN 978-0521716536.
