= Combe Hay =

Village and civil parish in England

Coordinates: 51.3389°N 2.3810°W

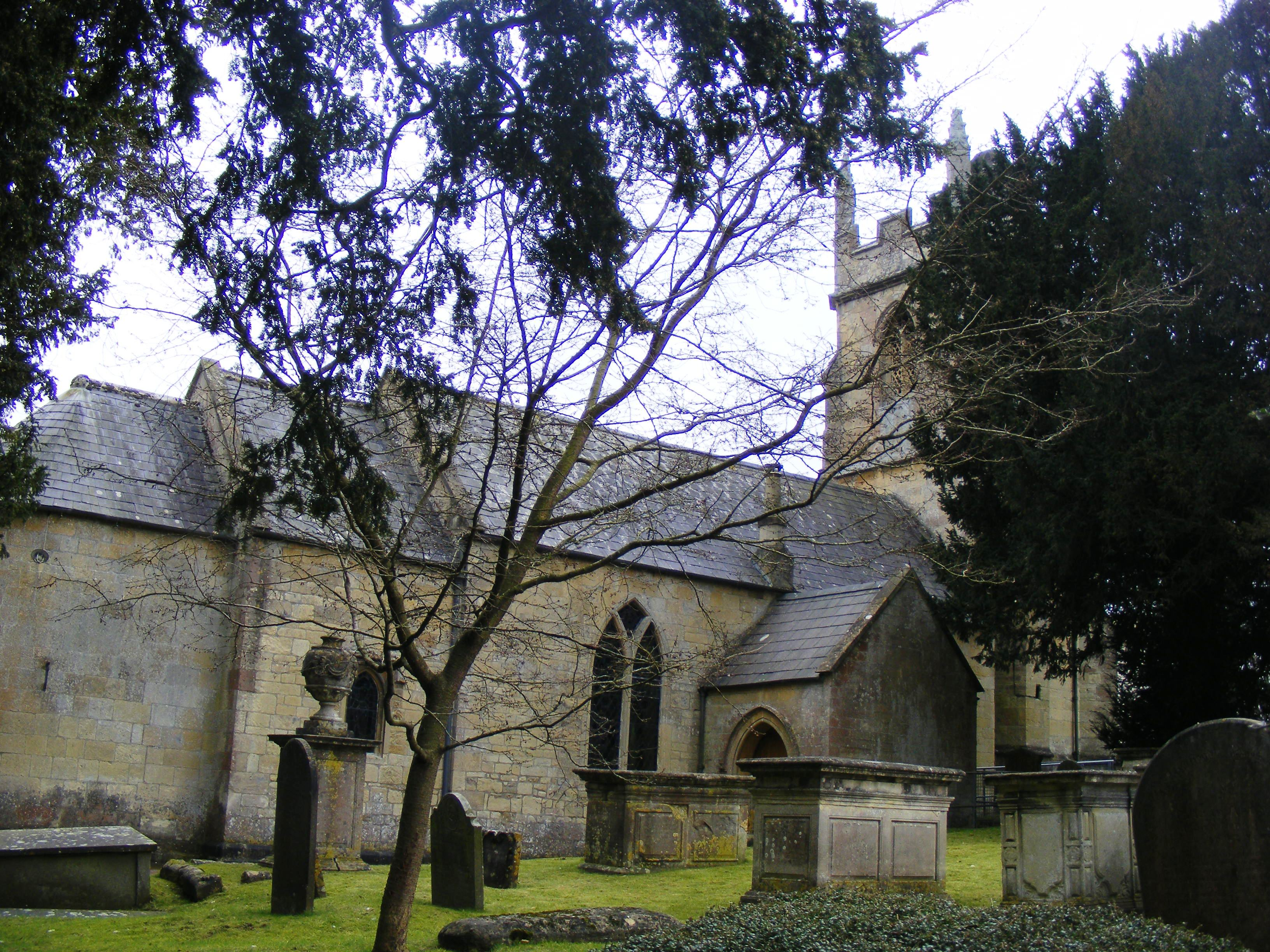
- Combe Hay Church

- Location within Somerset
- Population: 147
- OS grid reference: ST735600
- Unitary authority: Bath and North East Somerset
- Ceremonial county: Somerset
- Region: South West
- Country: England
- Sovereign state: United Kingdom
- Post town: Bath
- Postcode district: BA2
- Police: Avon and Somerset
- Fire: Avon
- Ambulance: South Western
- UK Parliament: Frome and East Somerset

Combe Hay is a village and civil parish in the English county of Somerset. It falls within the Cotswolds Area of Outstanding Natural Beauty. The parish has a population of 147.

== History ==
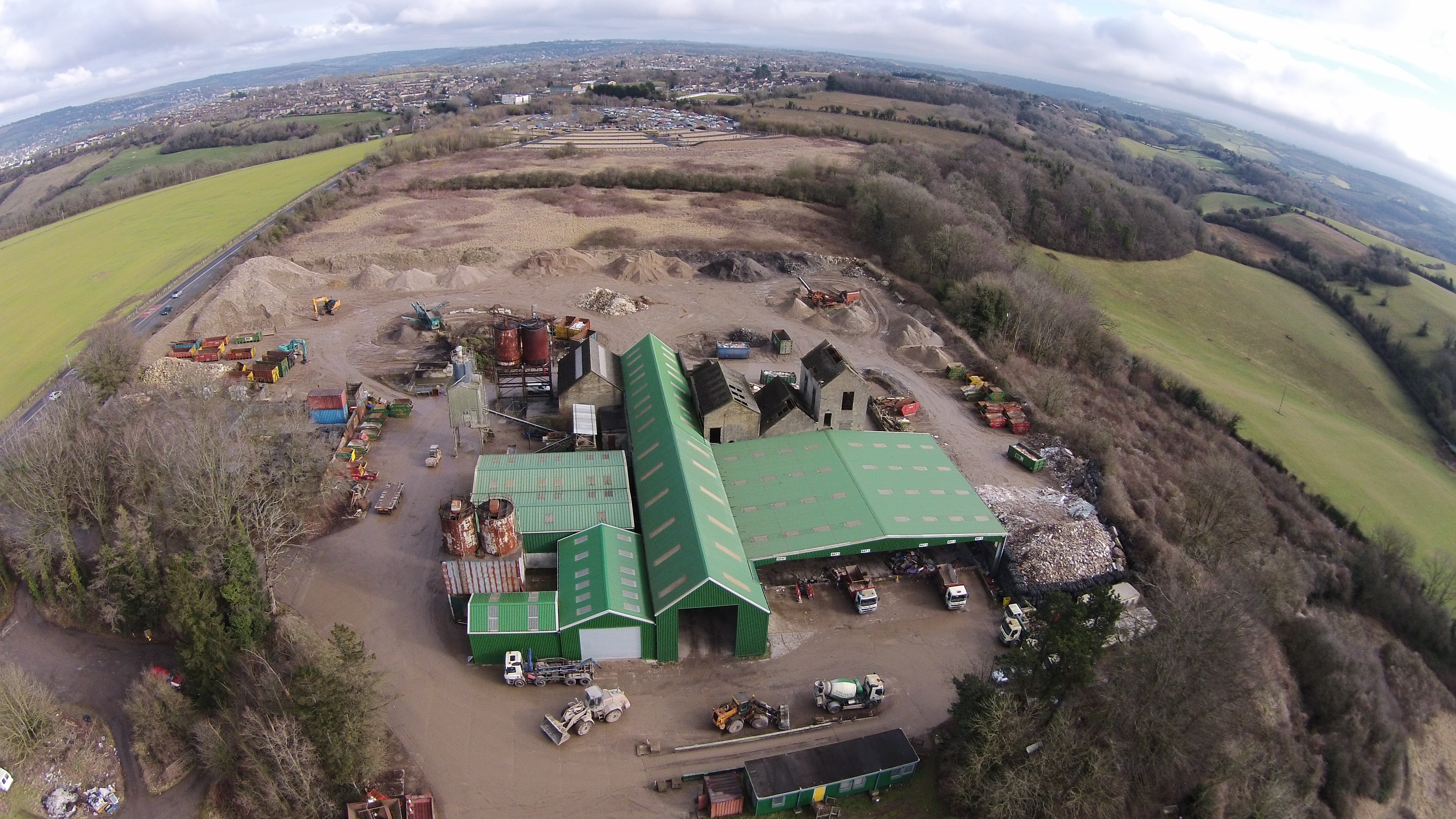
The Fuller's Earth Works at Combe Hay in 2015

Combe Hay was known in the Domesday Book as Cumb. The parish of Combe Hay was part of the Wellow Hundred.

The village includes a church with a 15th-century tower, the Georgian Combe Hay Manor and Georgian rectory.

Combe Hay was the site of a series of locks, dating from 1805 on the Somerset Coal Canal on which research and restoration is proposed. It is the site of one of the only caisson locks ever built which was near the current Caisson House. Many of the locks and associated workings are listed buildings. It was also served by the Camerton and Limpley Stoke Railway.

From the 1880s until 1980 mines extracting fuller's earth were to be found in Combe Hay. During World War II production expanded to supply foundries and in paint production. Work was scheduled under the Essential Works Order 1941 and new equipment installed. The site was bombed on the night of 25–26 April 1942 during the Baedeker Blitz raids on Bath, causing damage to some of the machines. The next night local residents sheltered in the mine. By the end of the war production was up to 250 tins a week. By 1949 the site had been electrified, therefore the Garrett steam engine was sold and the chimney demolished. The Fuller's Earth Union was taken over by Laporte plc. In 1978 a new extension was built making granules for cat litter, but in 1979 a major customer making cars in the West Midlands closed and production was wound down until closure in 1980.

The site of the former Fuller's earth works on the A367 was taken over by Bath Recycling Skips (see above image), in the distance is the Bath Odd Down Park & Ride at the end of Combe Hay Lane. Further development is planned just below this site with up to 171 new houses being developed, although with a great deal of opposition from the inhabitants of Southstoke and Combe Hay.

The village appears in the Ealing comedy The Titfield Thunderbolt.

== Governance ==
The parish council has responsibility for local issues, including setting an annual precept (local rate) to cover the council’s operating costs and producing annual accounts for public scrutiny. The parish council evaluates local planning applications and works with the local police, district council officers, and neighbourhood watch groups on matters of crime, security, and traffic. The parish council's role also includes initiating projects for the maintenance and repair of parish facilities, such as the village hall or community centre, playing fields and playgrounds, as well as consulting with the district council on the maintenance, repair, and improvement of highways, drainage, footpaths, public transport, and street cleaning. Conservation matters (including trees and listed buildings) and environmental issues are also of interest to the council.

The parish falls within the unitary authority of Bath and North East Somerset which was created in 1996, as established by the Local Government Act 1992. It provides a single tier of local government with responsibility for almost all local government functions within their area including local planning and building control, local roads, council housing, environmental health, markets and fairs, refuse collection, recycling, cemeteries, crematoria, leisure services, parks, and tourism. They are also responsible for education, social services, libraries, main roads, public transport, trading standards, waste disposal and strategic planning, although fire, police and ambulance services are provided jointly with other authorities through the Avon Fire and Rescue Service, Avon and Somerset Constabulary and the Great Western Ambulance Service.

Bath and North East Somerset's area covers part of the ceremonial county of Somerset but it is administered independently of the non-metropolitan county. Its administrative headquarters are in Bath. Between 1 April 1974 and 1 April 1996, it was the Wansdyke district and the City of Bath of the county of Avon. Before 1974 that the parish was part of the Bathavon Rural District.

The parish is represented in the House of Commons of the Parliament of the United Kingdom as part of the Frome and East Somerset constituency. It elects one Member of Parliament (MP) by the first past the post system of election. It was also part of the South West England constituency of the European Parliament prior to Britain leaving the European Union in January 2020, which elected seven MEPs using the d'Hondt method of party-list proportional representation.

== Religious sites ==
The Anglican parish church has a 15th-century tower but the body of the church was altered in the late 18th century and restored with the addition of a south aisle and porch in 1874, possibly by the Lord of the manor, George Smart.

== Gallery ==
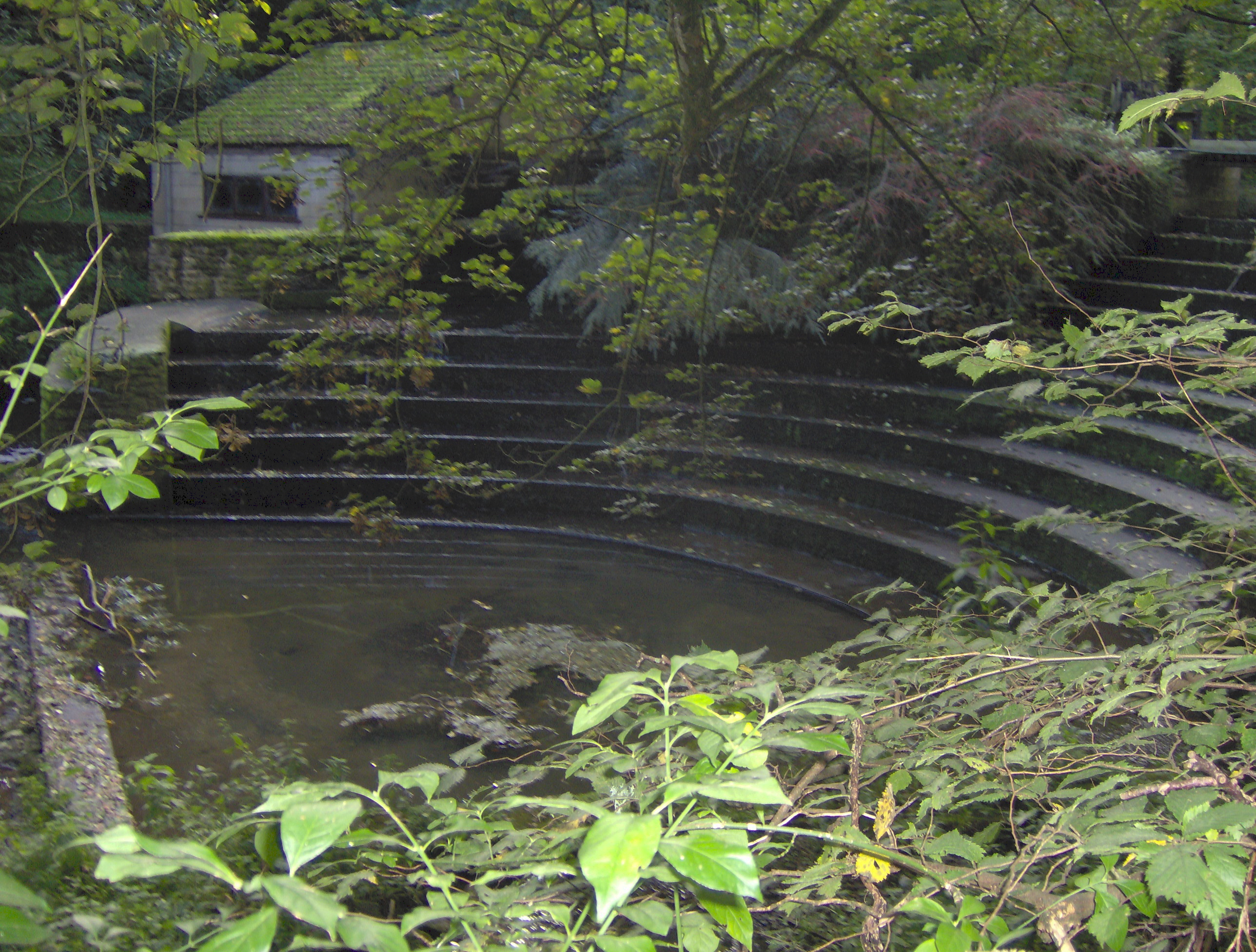
Weir on Cam Brook at Combe Hay

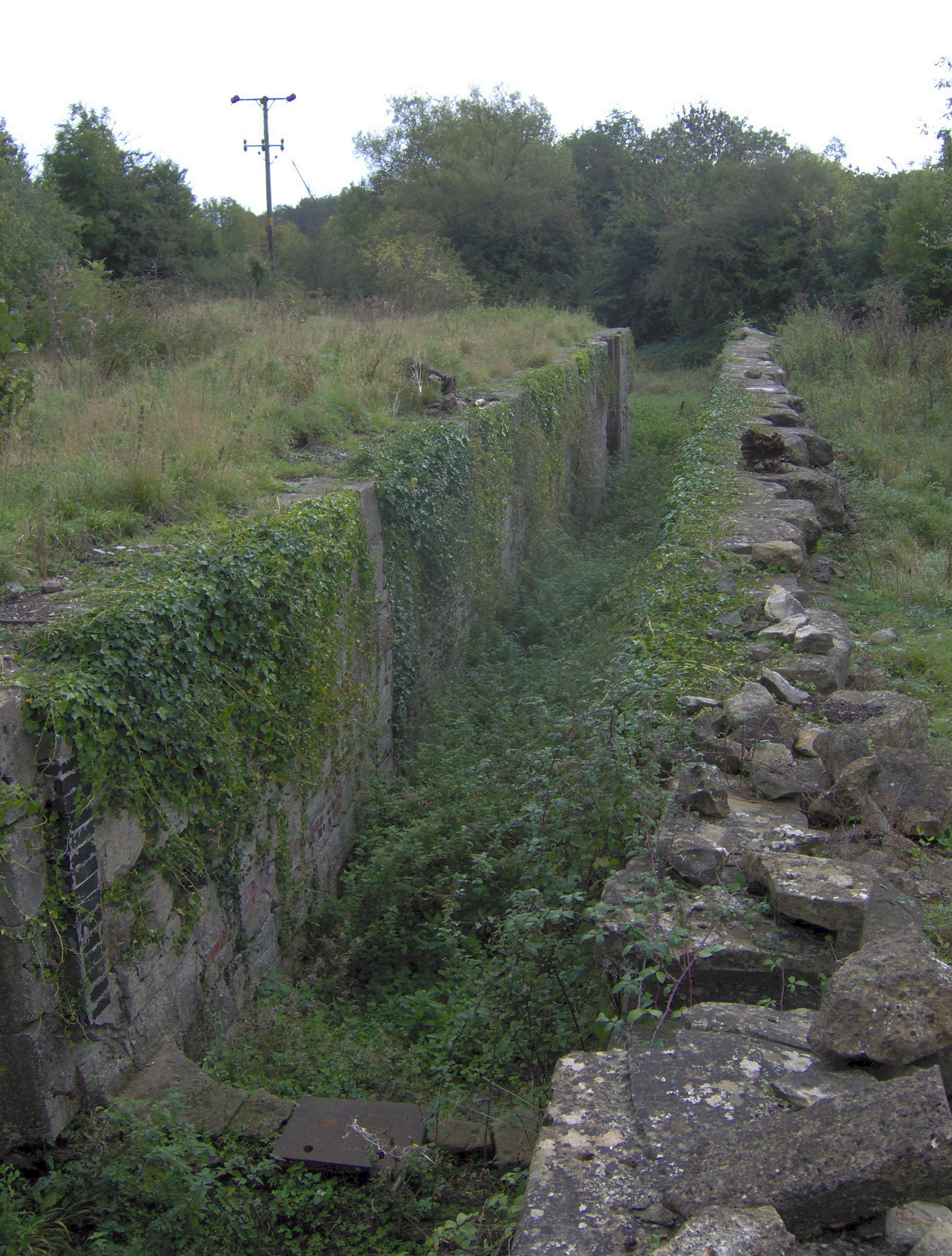
Derelict lock on the Somerset Coal Canal next to Caisson House
