= Christina Slade =

Australian academic and author

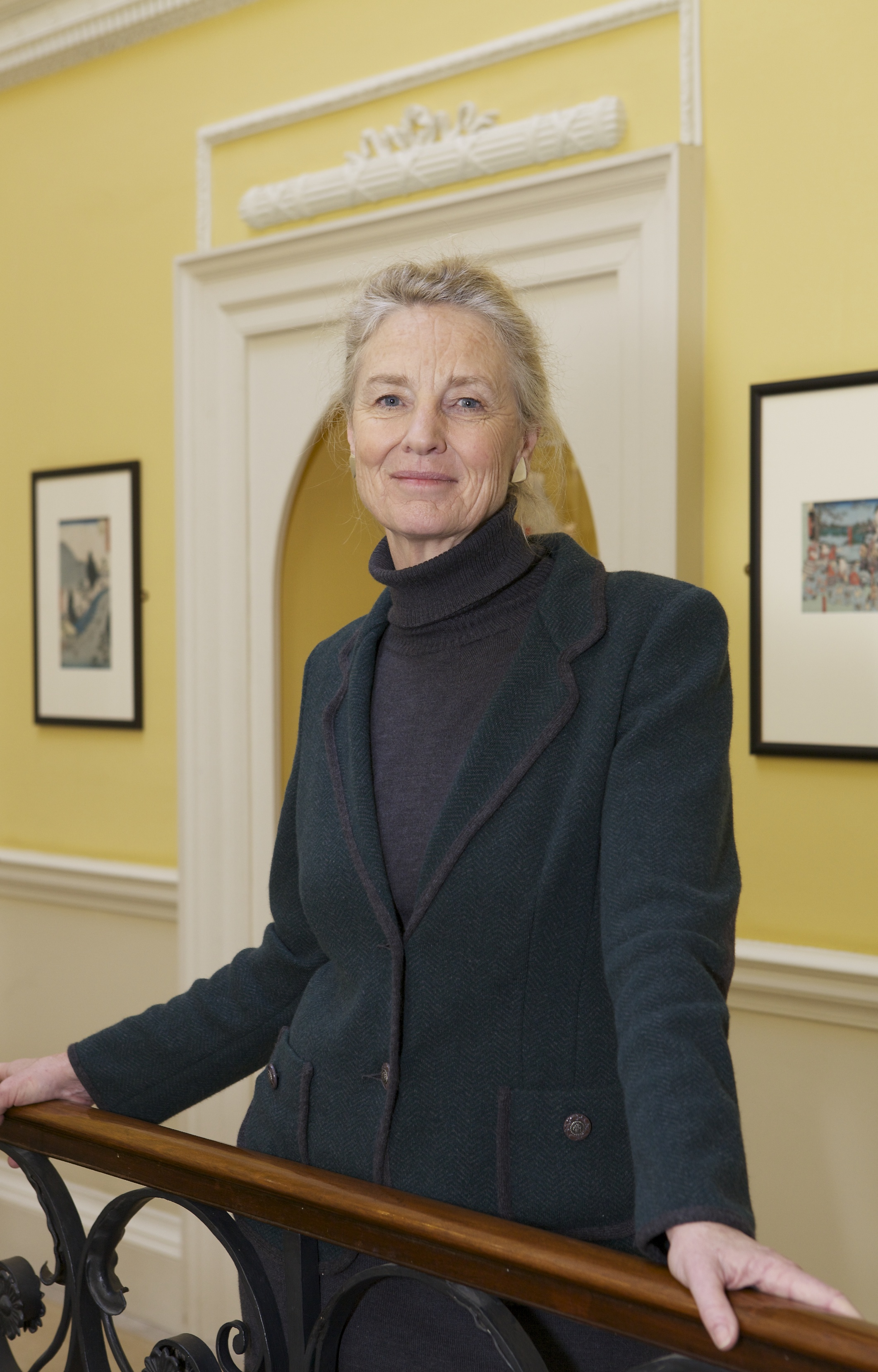
Slade in 2013

Christina M. Slade (born 1953) is an Australian academic and author. She was Vice-Chancellor of Bath Spa University in England from 2012 to 2017.

== Academic career ==
Slade was educated at the Australian National University, where she earned a BA and a PhD in Philosophy in 1982. Her early research focused on logic and the philosophy of language. Between 2001 and 2003, she was the Head of School for Creative Communication at the University of Canberra. Later, she was Dean of Humanities at Macquarie University until 2009.

During her tenure at the University of Utrecht as Professor of Media Theory, she led a €1.25 million EU-funded project, "Media and Citizenship," which examined transnational television cultures. Prior to her appointment at Bath Spa, she held senior roles at City, University of London, including Dean of the Schools of Arts and Social Sciences.

=== Vice-Chancellorship ===
Slade was appointed Vice-Chancellor of Bath Spa University in January 2012. Her tenure included the £40 million redevelopment of the university's Newton Park campus. She stepped down in August 2017 and was subsequently named an Emeritus Professor. Later in 2017, the university was criticised for making a £429,000 loss-of-office payment to her.

== Research and professional activities ==
Slade's research explores the intersection of philosophy and modern media. She is the author of The Real Thing: Doing Philosophy with Media (2002) and co-editor of From Migrant to Citizen: Testing Language, Testing Culture (2010).

She has served on several international boards, including the Academic Board of the University of Gibraltar and as a trustee for the Association of Commonwealth Universities. In 2019, she was elected a Fellow of the Royal Society of New South Wales.

Academic offices
Preceded by Frank Morgan	Vice-Chancellor of Bath Spa University; 2012–2017	Succeeded by Nick Foskett
