= Sharanjit Leyl =

Singaporean producer and presenter (born 1973)

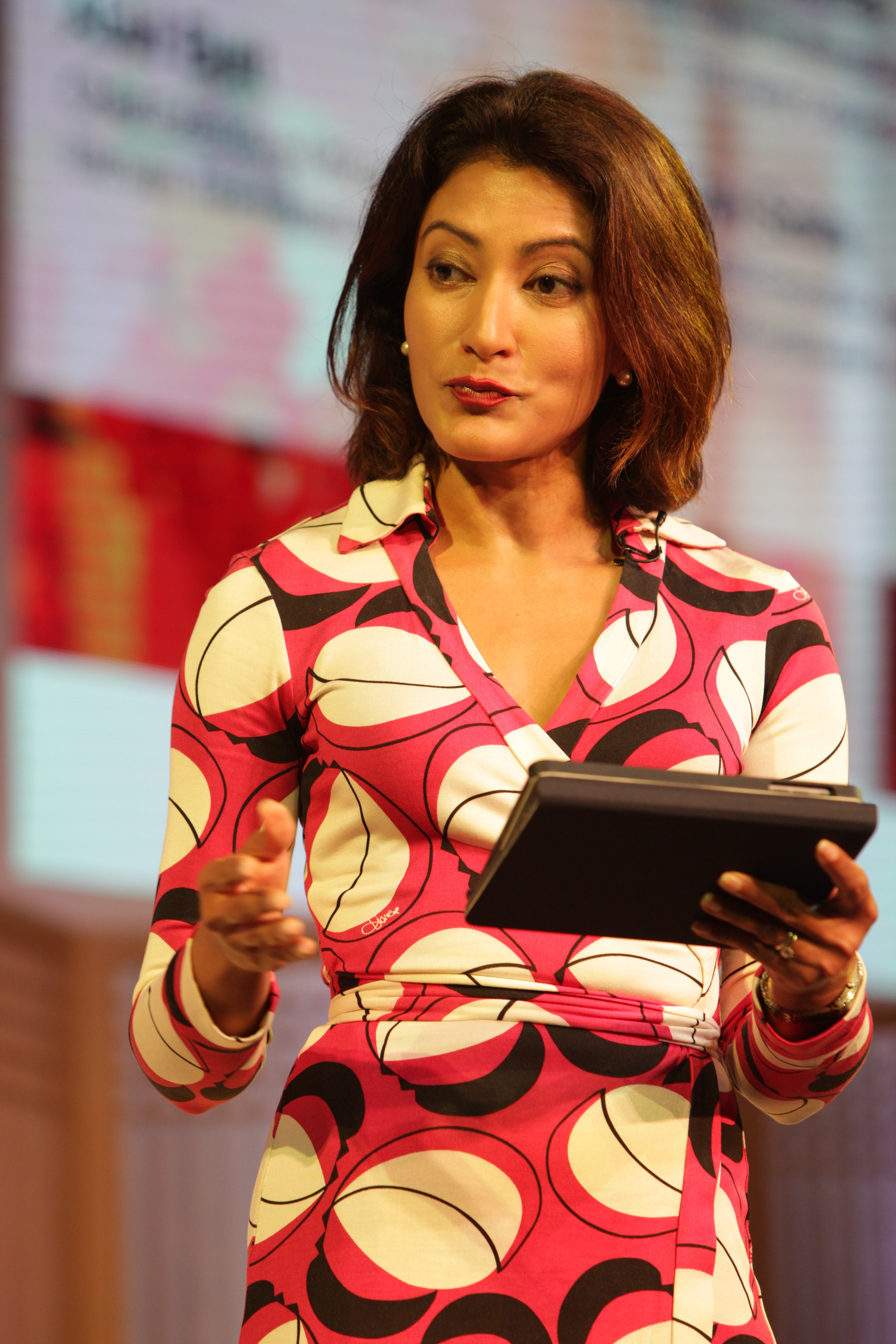
- Leyl in September 2013
- Born: Sharanjit Kaur Leyl; 15 February 1973 (age 53); Singapore
- Occupations: Journalist, News presenter
- Employer: BBC
- Notable credit(s): Bloomberg Television; Canadian Broadcasting Corporation; BBC World News
- Website: Sharanjit Leyl

Sharanjit Leyl (born 1973) is a Singaporean former producer/presenter, for the BBC. She regularly anchored Asia Business Report and Newsday on BBC One, the BBC News Channel and BBC World News from the BBC's Singapore studio. She was also a reporter and producer on the shows along with World Business Report. She has filed reports for radio on the BBC World Service business programmes as well as its arts and culture programmes, and written for BBC news online.

== Early life and education ==
Leyl was born in Singapore to a Sikh family of Indian descent that migrated to Singapore during the 1930s. Leyl moved to Washington, D.C. in her teens with her family, where her father worked for the Singapore Ministry of Defence in defence procurement. There she earned a degree in both journalism and English Literature from the University of Maryland College Park. She then moved to Vancouver, British Columbia, Canada where she completed a master's degree in English Literature at the University of British Columbia which focused on post-colonial writers such as Salman Rushdie.

== Career ==
Leyl began her broadcasting career at the Canadian Broadcasting Corporation in 1997. While there she reported for the award-winning show The Pacific Rim Report. In 1999 she moved to Singapore where she had a similar role at the financial news service provider Bridge Information Systems.

She joined Bloomberg Television in March 2000 and moved to its headquarters in Tokyo. There she presented its main three-hour newscast, "On The Money Asia", reporting on breaking financial stories as well as major news events such as the US-led invasion of Iraq in March 2003. Leyl played an integral role in editing and influencing the content of Bloomberg's Asian programming.

Leyl joined the BBC as a producer and reporter in September 2003 and has since reported and presented from places as far afield as Pakistan, Tokyo and London. She has also presented Impact, Global, World Business Report, Asia Today and World News Today during several spells in London.

Her other interviews have included the Chairman of Starbucks, Howard Schultz; Prime Minister of Canada, Justin Trudeau; the Prime Minister of Pakistan; former leaders of Singapore and Malaysia; and heads of the World Bank.

On 8 May 2024, Leyl was installed as the new Chancellor of Bath Spa University, making her the first female Chancellor of the university, the second Chancellor in almost 20 years, and the first Asian Chancellor of a British university in the United Kingdom.

== Personal life ==
Leyl lives with her English husband and their son and divides her time between Singapore and Bath, Somerset. Her hobbies include running, politics, art and theatre.
