= Joe Bennett (musician) =

American music writer (born 1969)

- Born: 1969 (age 55–56)
- Occupation: Professor at Berklee College of Music
- Website: joebennett.net

Joe Bennett (born 1969) is a Professor at Berklee College of Music and previously Professor of Popular Music at Bath Spa University. He has written about 40 popular-music-related books, covering music theory, guitar effects and altered tunings, as well as over 300 articles and reviews for Total Guitar, Classic CD, Music Tech magazine and Future Music. His compositions include set works for the Rockschool guitar, bass and drums syllabus. His academic research relates to creativity and originality in songwriting, and he acts as a consultant and expert witness in music copyright disputes.
