= Tim Warnes =

English chhildren's book writer and illustrator

Tim Warnes (born 11 June 1971) is an English children's book writer and illustrator. He has been publishing books since 1995.

By 2015 he created over 70 books.

== Books and awards ==
- The Big Book Adventure
  - IBPA BENJAMIN FRANKLIN SILVER AWARD (CHILDREN'S PICTURE BOOKS) 2019
  - FOREWORD INDIE GOLD AWARD (PICTURE BOOKS, EARLY READER) 2018
- I DON’T WANT TO GO TO BED!
  - NOTTINGHAMSHIRE CHILDREN'S BOOK AWARD 1996
  - DUTCH LIBRARIES ASSOCIATION'S CHILDREN'S BOOK PRIZE 1997
- I DON’T WANT TO HAVE A BATH!
  - NOTTINGHAMSHIRE CHILDREN'S BOOK AWARD 1998
- OH, BORIS! (A.K.A. THE NEW BEAR AT SCHOOL)
  - Smithsonian magazine 2008 notable book selection
- 2016: The Great Cheese Robbery
