= Eliane Glaser =

English writer, radio producer and broadcaster

Eliane Glaser is an English writer, radio producer and broadcaster.

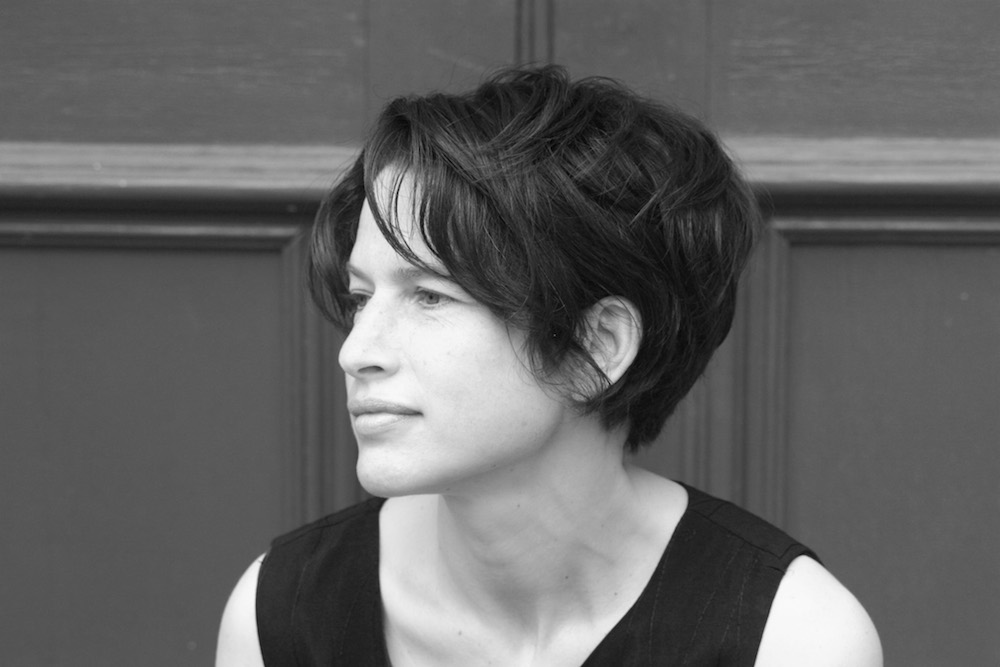

== Early life and media career ==
Glaser was educated at St Edmund Hall, Oxford, graduating from Oxford University with a First Class degree in English literature in 1995, before gaining her PhD in early modern literature in 2000 at Birkbeck, University of London.

Glaser's articles appear in the Guardian, Prospect, the London Review of Books, Aeon, Engelsberg Ideas and other places. She has written articles on contemporary propaganda, fake authenticity, Astroturf politics, cyber-utopianism, and the ideology of natural childbirth. Glaser is a regular contributor to, producer of, and sometime presenter for Radio 4 and BBC Radio 3. She has worked on Start the Week, In Our Time, Free Thinking and Front Row. Her documentaries include Noise on BBC Radio 3, a reflection on contemporary tick-box culture and digital bureaucracy, which won a gold award for best sound art at the New York Festivals Radio Awards. Her books include Motherhood: Feminism’s Unfinished Business (Fourth Estate, 2021); Elitism: A Progressive Defence (Biteback, 2020); Anti-Politics: On the Demonization of Ideology, Authority and the State (Repeater, 2018); and Get Real: How to See Through the Hype, Spin and Lies of Modern Life (Fourth Estate, 2012).

== Academic work ==
Glaser's work often focuses on contemporary culture and politics, and "exposes other people's polemical strategies, particularly when they are concealed or disavowed; presented as self-evident fact." Glaser has written reports and articles for the New Economics Foundation and the Institute for Public Policy Research. She has served on the management committee of the Compass think tank. She was previously Reader in Creative Writing at Bath Spa University, has a PhD in English literature, and has organised and chaired numerous conferences and panel events.

She is currently a Visiting Fellow at Jesus College, Cambridge.

== Books ==
| Year | Title | Publisher | ISBN |
|---|---|---|---|
| 2007 | Judaism without Jews: Philosemitism and Christian Polemic in Early Modern England | Palgrave Macmillan | 978–0230507746 |
| 2012 | Get Real: How to Tell it Like it is in a World of Illusions | Fourth Estate | 978–0007416820 |
| 2018 | Anti-Politics: On the Demonization of Ideology | Repeater Books | 978–1912248117 |
| 2020 | Elitism: A Progressive Defence | Biteback Publishing | 9781785906077 |
| 2021 | Motherhood: A Manifesto | Fourth Estate | 978–0008311889 |
