= Newton St Loe =

Village in Somerset, England

Coordinates: 51.3814°N 2.4260°W

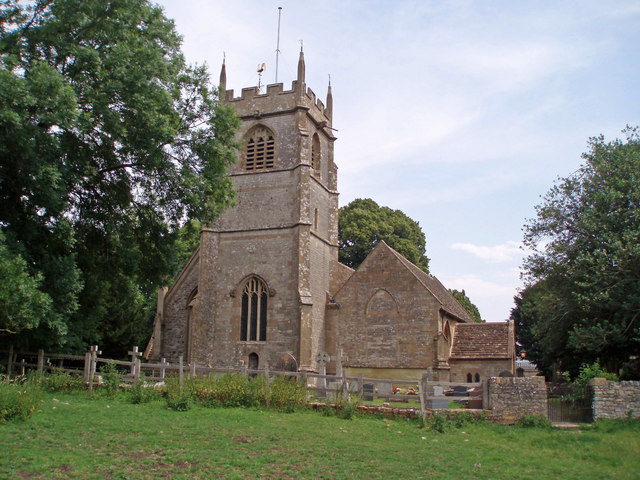
- Holy Trinity Church

- Location within Somerset
- Population: 681 (2011)
- OS grid reference: ST703648
- Civil parish: Newton St Loe
- Unitary authority: Bath and North East Somerset
- Ceremonial county: Somerset
- Region: South West
- Country: England
- Sovereign state: United Kingdom
- Post town: BATH
- Postcode district: BA2
- Dialling code: 01225
- Police: Avon and Somerset
- Fire: Avon
- Ambulance: South Western
- UK Parliament: North East Somerset and Hanham

Newton St Loe is a small Somerset village and civil parish located close to the villages of Corston and Stanton Prior, between Bath and Bristol in England. The majority of the village is owned by the Duchy of Cornwall. The parish has a population of 681.

== History ==
The Saxon manor of Newton, held by Aluric in the time of King Edward the Confessor, was given to the bishop of Coutances by William the Conqueror. At the time of Domesday the bishop was Geoffrey de Montbray also known from his see as Geoffrey of Coutances, a Norman nobleman, trusted adviser of William and a great secular prelate, warrior and administrator. Newton St Loe takes its additional name from the family of St. Lo, who drew their name from Saint-Lô in Normandy; the family, Latinized in documents as "de Sancto Laudo", held the manor in the time of Richard I. Ultimately, the town's name is derived from the 6th-century bishop Saint Laud of Coutances.

There is evidence of a 3rd-century Roman villa on a site between Newton St Loe and Bath on the south side of the River Avon. It was discovered in 1837 during the cutting of the Bristol-Bath railway line when excavations were carried out and drawings of the site made before much of it was lost in the railway construction. Two mosaics were removed, one of which, known as the Orpheus Mosaic, is now in the Bristol Museum and Art Gallery. A further investigation was carried out in 1968 before the widening of the A4, but it is still the case that little is known about the villa.

The parish was recorded in the Domesday Book in 1086 with the name Niwetone. The parish of Newton St Loe was part of the Wellow Hundred.

There is a history of coal mining in the area as part of the Somerset coalfield but all mines have now closed. Lower and Middle Coal Measures at depths between 500 and 5,000 feet (150 and 1,520 metres) of the Pensford Syncline, were worked at the Globe Pit in Newton St Loe in the 19th century.

There was formerly a forge at the top of Smith Hill that leads up into the village.

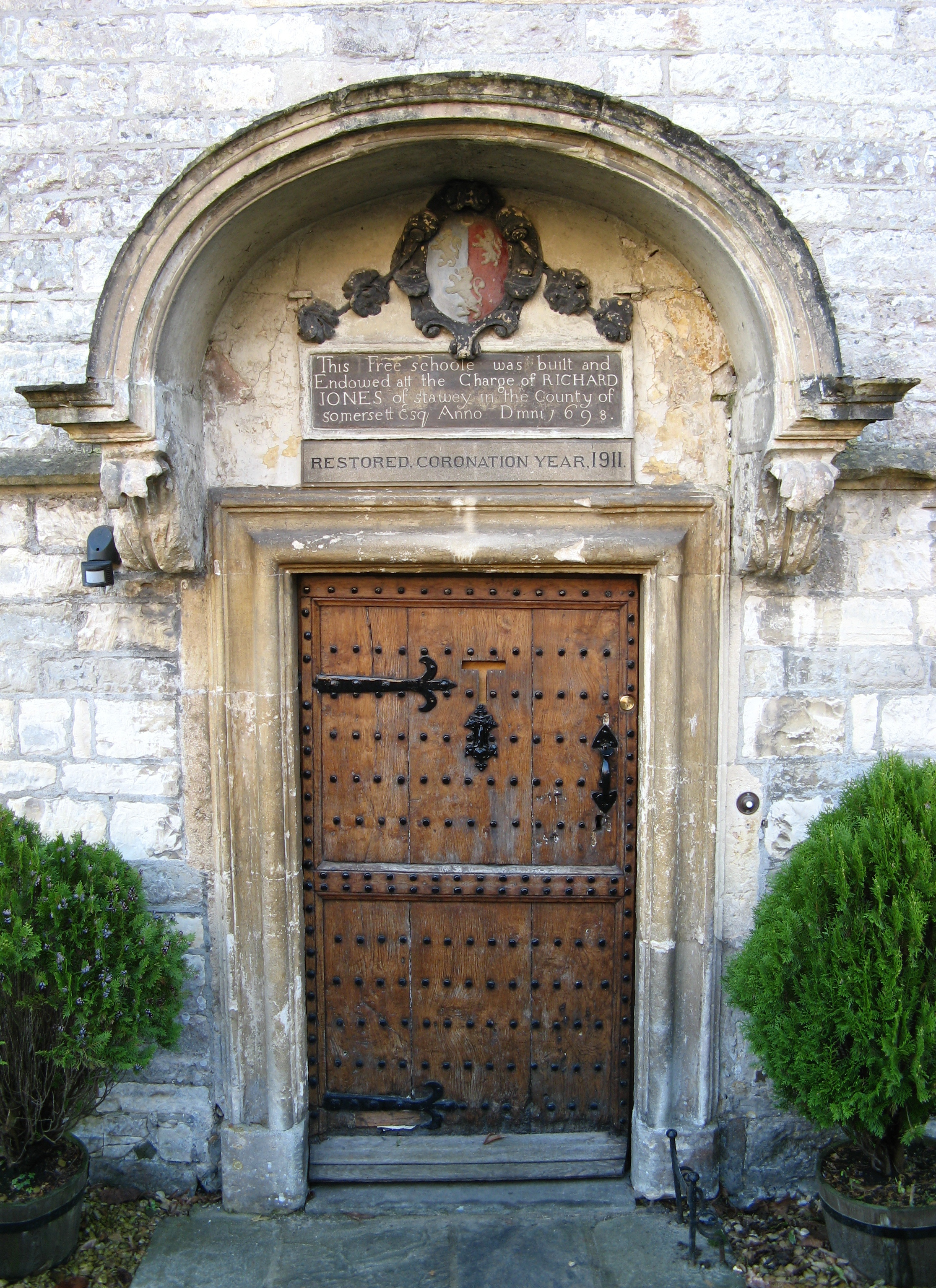
Former school entrance

The village school, established in 1698 close by Holy Trinity Church, closed in 1972. Queen Elizabeth II visited the school on 17 April 1956 when she came to the village following her official opening of the Chew Valley reservoir. The village also once had a girls' school, now the village hall, built in 1846.

== Governance ==
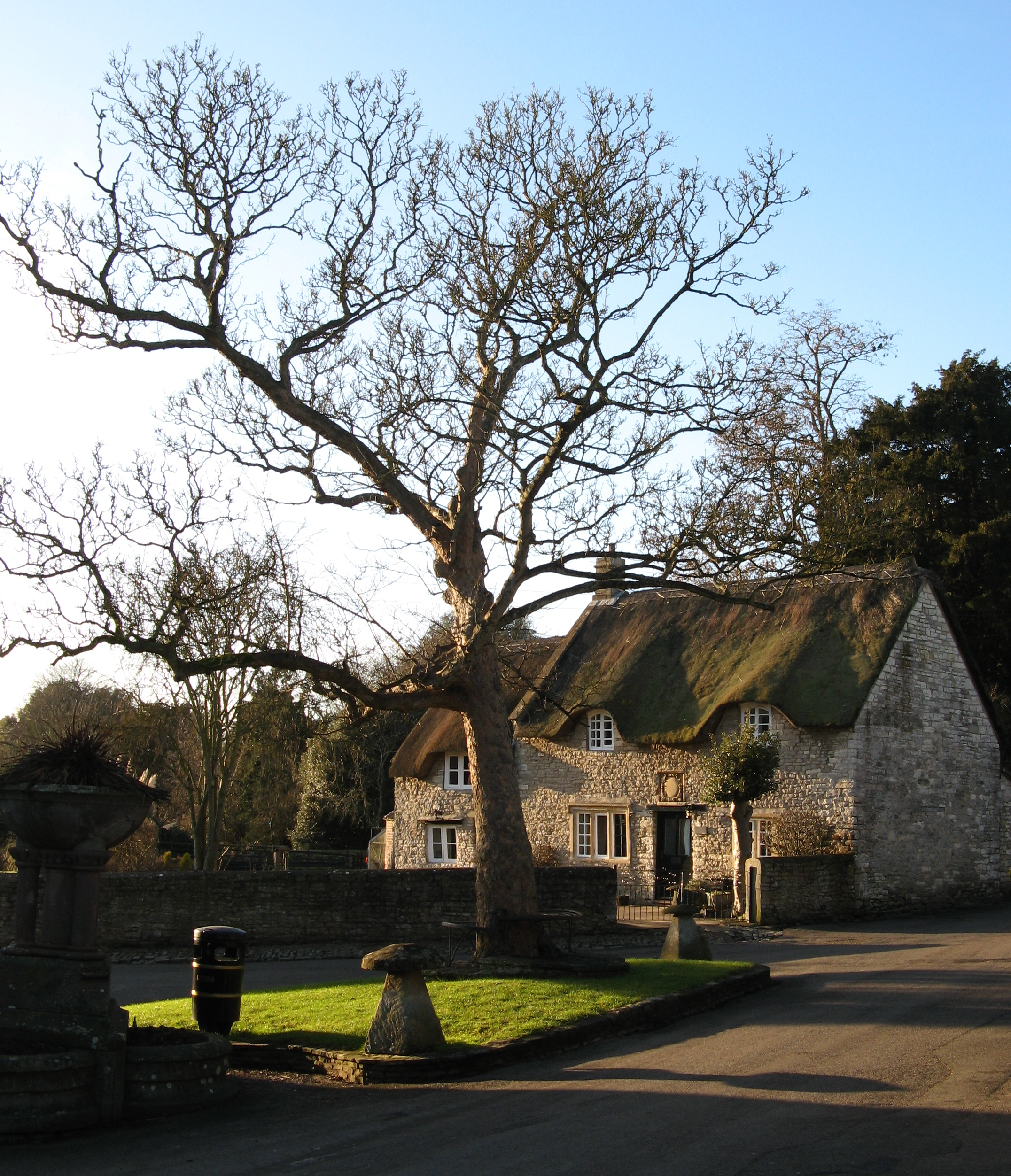
A thatched cottage in the village

The parish council has responsibility for local issues, including setting an annual precept (local rate) to cover the council's operating costs and producing annual accounts for public scrutiny. The parish council evaluates local planning applications and works with the local police, district council officers, and neighbourhood watch groups on matters of crime, security, and traffic. The parish council's role also includes initiating projects for the maintenance and repair of parish facilities, such as the village hall or community centre, playing fields and playgrounds, as well as consulting with the district council on the maintenance, repair, and improvement of highways, drainage, footpaths, public transport, and street cleaning. Conservation matters (including trees and listed buildings) and environmental issues are also of interest to the council.

The parish falls within the unitary authority of Bath and North East Somerset which was created in 1996, as established by the Local Government Act 1992. It provides a single tier of local government with responsibility for almost all local government functions within their area including local planning and building control, local roads, council housing, environmental health, markets and fairs, refuse collection, recycling, cemeteries, crematoria, leisure services, parks, and tourism. They are also responsible for education, social services, libraries, main roads, public transport, Trading Standards, waste disposal and strategic planning, although fire, police and ambulance services are provided jointly with other authorities through the Avon Fire and Rescue Service, Avon and Somerset Constabulary and the Great Western Ambulance Service.

Bath and North East Somerset's area covers part of the ceremonial county of Somerset but it is administered independently of the non-metropolitan county. Its administrative headquarters are in Bath. Between 1 April 1974 and 1 April 1996, the parish was in Wansdyke district of the county of Avon. Before 1974 it was part of Bathavon Rural District.

The parish falls within the 'Bathavon West' electoral ward. Newton St Loe is the most northerly parish in this ward which then stretches south to Camerton. The total population of this ward taken at the 2011 census was 2,435.

The parish is represented in the House of Commons of the Parliament of the United Kingdom as part of North East Somerset and Hanham. It elects one member of parliament by the first past the post system of election.

== Geography ==
The land around the village is used for arable farming and grassland. The soil overlies Lias Limestone with shallow well-drained calcareous clays and clay loams.

To the south west of the village and close to the route of the Wansdyke is the Newton Park campus of Bath Spa University. The site includes the Michael Tippett Centre, named after the composer, with a modern concert hall. The campus is based in Newton Park in grounds designed by Capability Brown and leased from the Duchy of Cornwall. The site has a lake, nature reserve, woodland and farmland.

Newton St Loe SSSI is a geological Site of Special Scientific Interest (SSSI) close to the River Avon, also featured in the Geological Conservation Review. The site is designated as an SSSI because it represents the only remaining known exposure of fossiliferous Pleistocene gravels along the River Avon. In conjunction with other sites within the wider area, it has aided the development of a scientific understanding of the history of early glaciation within South West England. The bodies of mammoths (Mammuthus) and horses (Equus) have been found at the site.

Carrs Woodland between Newton St Loe and Twerton is designated as a Local Nature Reserve.

=== Climate ===
Along with the rest of South West England, Newton St Loe has a temperate climate which is generally wetter and milder than the rest of the country. The annual mean temperature is approximately 10 °C (50.0 °F). Seasonal temperature variation is less extreme than most of the United Kingdom because of the adjacent sea temperatures. The summer months of July and August are the warmest with mean daily maxima of approximately 21 °C (69.8 °F). In winter mean minimum temperatures of 1 °C (33.8 °F) or 2 °C (35.6 °F) are common. In the summer the Azores high pressure affects the south-west of England, however convective cloud sometimes forms inland, reducing the number of hours of sunshine. Annual sunshine rates are slightly less than the regional average of 1,600 hours. In December 1998 there were 20 days without sun recorded at Yeovilton. Most of the rainfall in the south-west is caused by Atlantic depressions or by convection. Most of the rainfall in autumn and winter is caused by the Atlantic depressions, which is when they are most active. In summer, a large proportion of the rainfall is caused by sun heating the ground leading to convection and to showers and thunderstorms. Average rainfall is around 700 mm (28 in). About 8–15 days of snowfall is typical. November to March have the highest mean wind speeds, and June to August have the lightest winds. The predominant wind direction is from the south-west.

== Landmarks ==
The Newton Park mansion, which was built in 1762–65 by Stiff Leadbetter for Joseph Langton, is a Grade I listed building and its estate which is currently home to Bath Spa University. The mansion was used as a Red Cross hospital to house Australian and New Zealand troops in World War I. The grounds include Newton St Loe Castle, comprising a keep (which was part of a fortified mansion) and a 15th-century gatehouse, which are both Grade I listed.

== Duchy of Cornwall ==
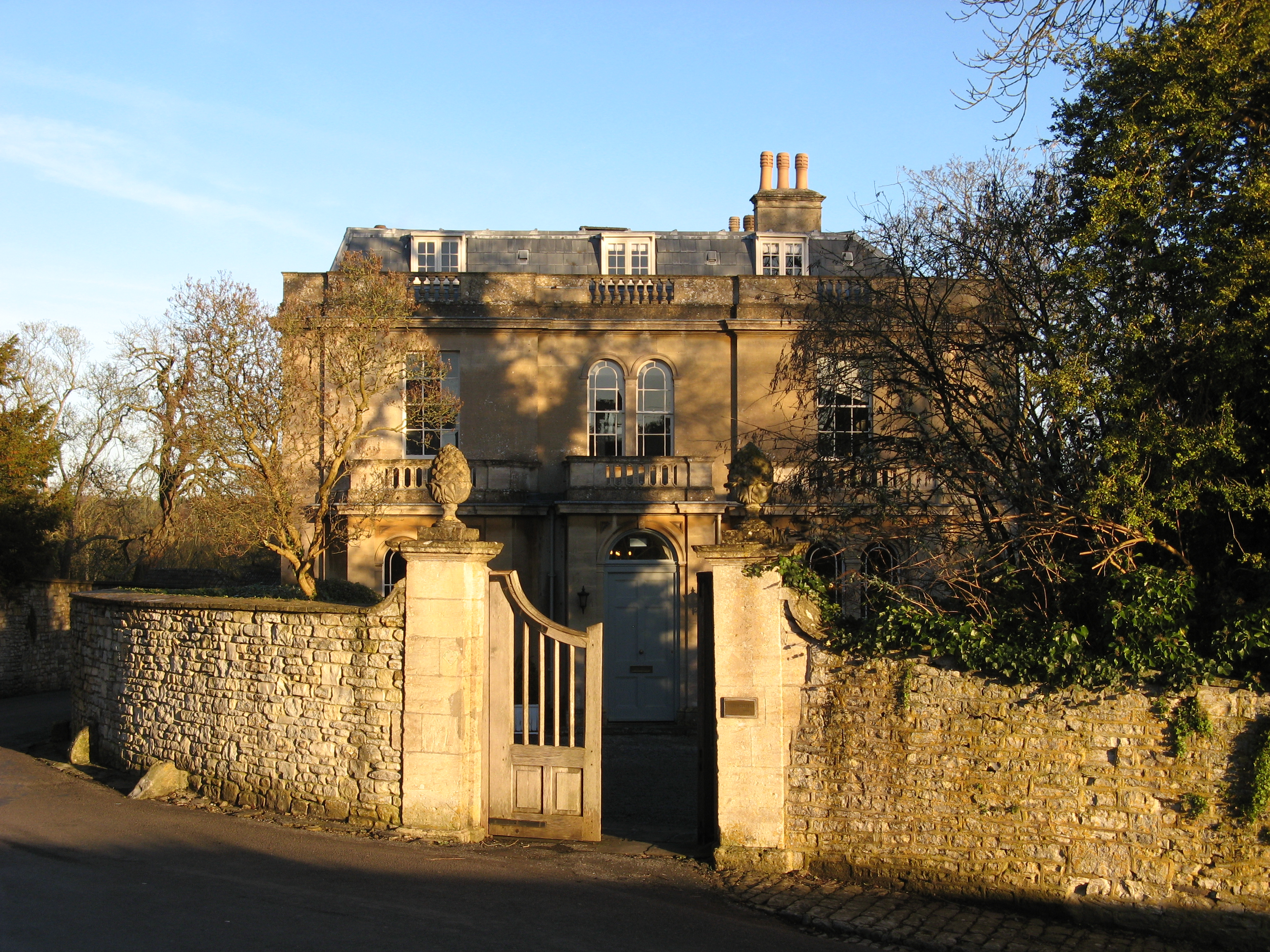
Duchy of Cornwall office

The Duchy of Cornwall purchased the Newton Park Estate, which included much property in the village, following the death of 5th Earl Temple in 1941. Together with the adjacent Manor of Inglescombe (Englishcombe) that the Duchy already owned, this created the Duchy's largest estate outside Dartmoor.

The Duchy's largest rural portfolio office is in the village. This is the headquarters of the eastern district, covering Somerset, Dorset, Wiltshire, Gloucestershire and Herefordshire, the centralised finance and property services office, and the Estate Surveyor office.

Plans by the Duchy to build 2,000 houses on greenfield land between the village and the outskirts of Bath have caused controversy. A regional strategy had identified the Duchy's site as an area for development, however after the 2010 United Kingdom general election this was revised and Bath and North East Somerset Council changed its decision about the development, ruling that it should not go ahead on environmental grounds. The Duchy said it would challenge the decision at a public inquiry during 2011.

== Church ==
The local Church of the Holy Trinity dates back from the 11th century. An interesting feature is its clock, which has only one hand. The church is noted in the Domesday Book (where the village was recorded as "Newtonne"), and is a Grade II* listed building.

== Notable people ==
- William Henry Bliss an English scholar and Anglican convert to Catholicism was born in Newton St Loe in 1835.
- Francis Gore (1855–1938), first-class cricketer and British Army officer
