= Bath Spa University =

Public university in Bath, Somerset, England

- Type: Public
- Established: 2005 – Bath Spa University (gained university status); 1997 – Bath Spa University College; 1975 – Bath College of Higher Education; 1852 – Bath School of Art
- Affiliations: ACU; MillionPlus; Universities UK
- Endowment: £581,000 (2016)
- Chancellor: Sharanjit Leyl
- Vice-Chancellor: Georgina Andrews
- Students: 28,970 (2024/25)
- Undergraduates: 27,440 (2024/25)
- Postgraduates: 1,530 (2024/25)
- Location: Bath, Somerset, BA2 9BN (main campus), England; 51°22′32″N 2°26′18″W
- Campus: Rural
- Colors: Slate blue and Limestone
- Website: bathspa.ac.uk

Bath Spa University is a public university in Bath, England, with its main campus at Newton Park, about 3 1/2 miles (5.6 km) west of the centre of the city. The university has other campuses in the city of Bath and London, as well as a site at Corsham Court in Wiltshire.

The institution gained full university status in August 2005, having been previously known as Bath College of Higher Education, and later Bath Spa University College.

== History ==
The institution can trace its roots back to the foundation of the Bath School of Art in 1852, following the impact of The Great Exhibition of 1851.

In 1946, Bath Teacher Training College was opened on the Newton Park campus, as part of the post-war initiatives to fill wartime teaching shortages. It was a women's college offering two year courses, under the Principal Mary Dawson. The present institution was formed in 1975 as Bath College of Higher Education by the merger of Bath Teacher Training College and Bath College of Domestic Science. In 1983 Bath Academy of Art also merged into the college.

In 1992, the college was granted degree-awarding powers and in 1997 adopted the name Bath Spa University College. In March 2005 the institution was granted university status, becoming Bath Spa University in August 2005.

In 2013, the university was the UK's sixth-largest provider of teacher education.

== Campuses ==
=== Newton Park, Bath ===
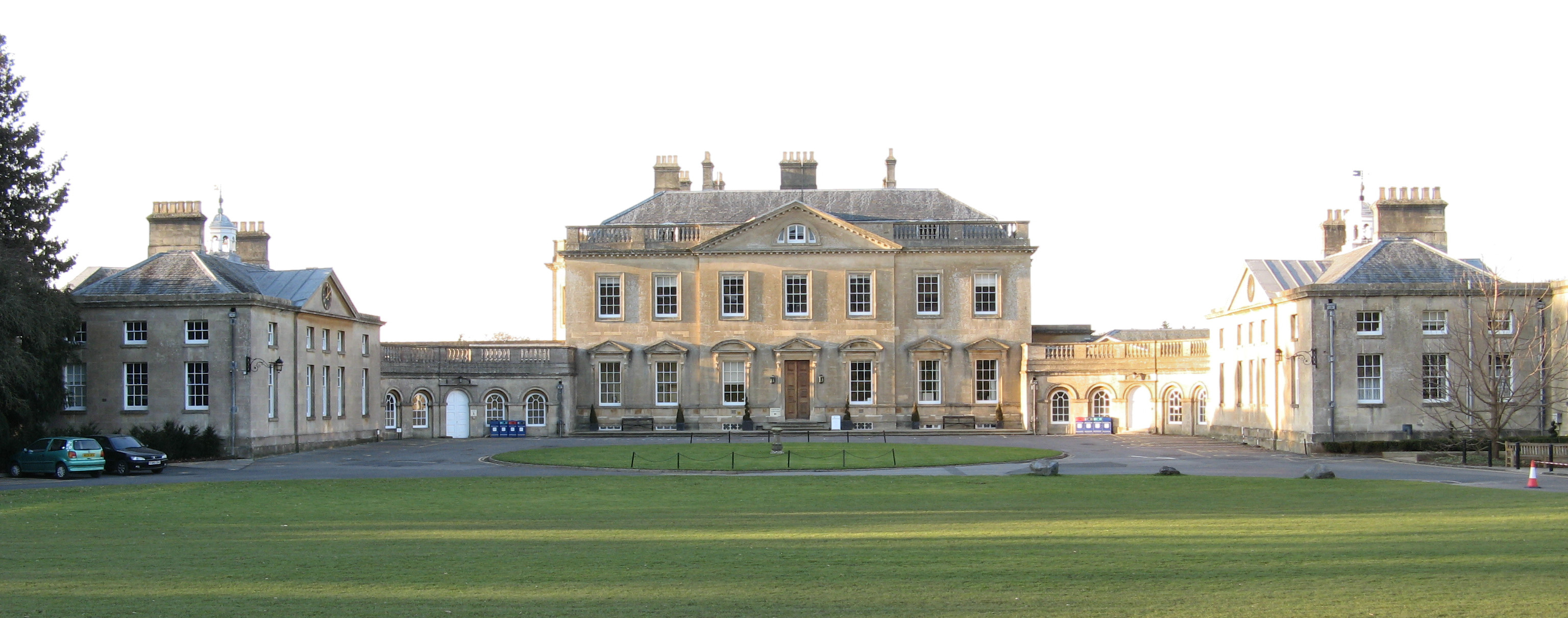
The 18th-century Georgian country house at Newton Park

The Newton Park campus, to the west of Bath near the village of Newton St Loe, is the largest of the university's three main campuses. It is here that courses from all schools are taught, with the exception of art and design. The campus is in Newton Park, in grounds designed by English landscape architect Lancelot "Capability" Brown and leased from the Duchy of Cornwall.

The campus has buildings from a mixture of ages. These include the Grade I listed Main House built between 1762 and 1765 by Stiff Leadbetter for Joseph Langton MP; the remnants of the 14th-century Newton St Loe Castle, a scheduled monument also with Grade I listed status; and Grade II* listed stable buildings, gardens and a walled garden.

It is the university's only campus to have student accommodation on site, and is also home to the Students' Union. The site has a lake, nature reserve, woodlands and arable farmland. The site underwent extensive development in the 2010s.

==== 'Commons' academic building ====
In the summer of 2012, work began on the development of a new academic building called "Commons", roughly in the centre of the Newton Park campus. Next to the academic building is an outside amphitheatre, primarily for use by the School of Music and Performing arts. The building was officially opened on 5 June 2014 by film producer Lord Puttnam.

==== Michael Tippett Centre ====
The Michael Tippett Centre is the only purpose-built concert hall in Bath. The building has many teaching rooms and spaces, and the hall is used for lectures, mainly by the School of Music and Performing Arts. The hall is also used for exhibitions, musical performances and plays from student performers as well professional acts from around the country.

==== University Theatre ====
The University Theatre, completed in 2006, was part of a £5.7m scheme designed by Fielden Clegg Bradley Architects LLP. It consists of a 186-seat auditorium with backstage and technical facilities, and three large teaching studios. The venue is used by the School of Music and Performing Arts for teaching actors, directors, production managers, choreographers and dancers.

=== Locksbrook, Bath ===
In October 2015, the university announced that it had submitted proposals for the purchase and redevelopment of the former Herman Miller furniture factory on Locksbrook Road, Bath, about 1 1/4 miles (2.0 km) west of Bath city centre. The site would become a new home for Bath School of Art and Design, as the Sion Hill campus did not provide enough academic space. The factory was designed by Nicholas Grimshaw, completed in 1977 and Grade II listed in 2013.

In 2016, the purchase went ahead, and the planning application for the redevelopment was approved by Bath and North East Somerset Council in September 2017. Remodelling and refurbishment was again designed by Grimshaw Architects, and the building was opened as the Locksbrook Campus in October 2019.

=== Sion Hill, Bath ===
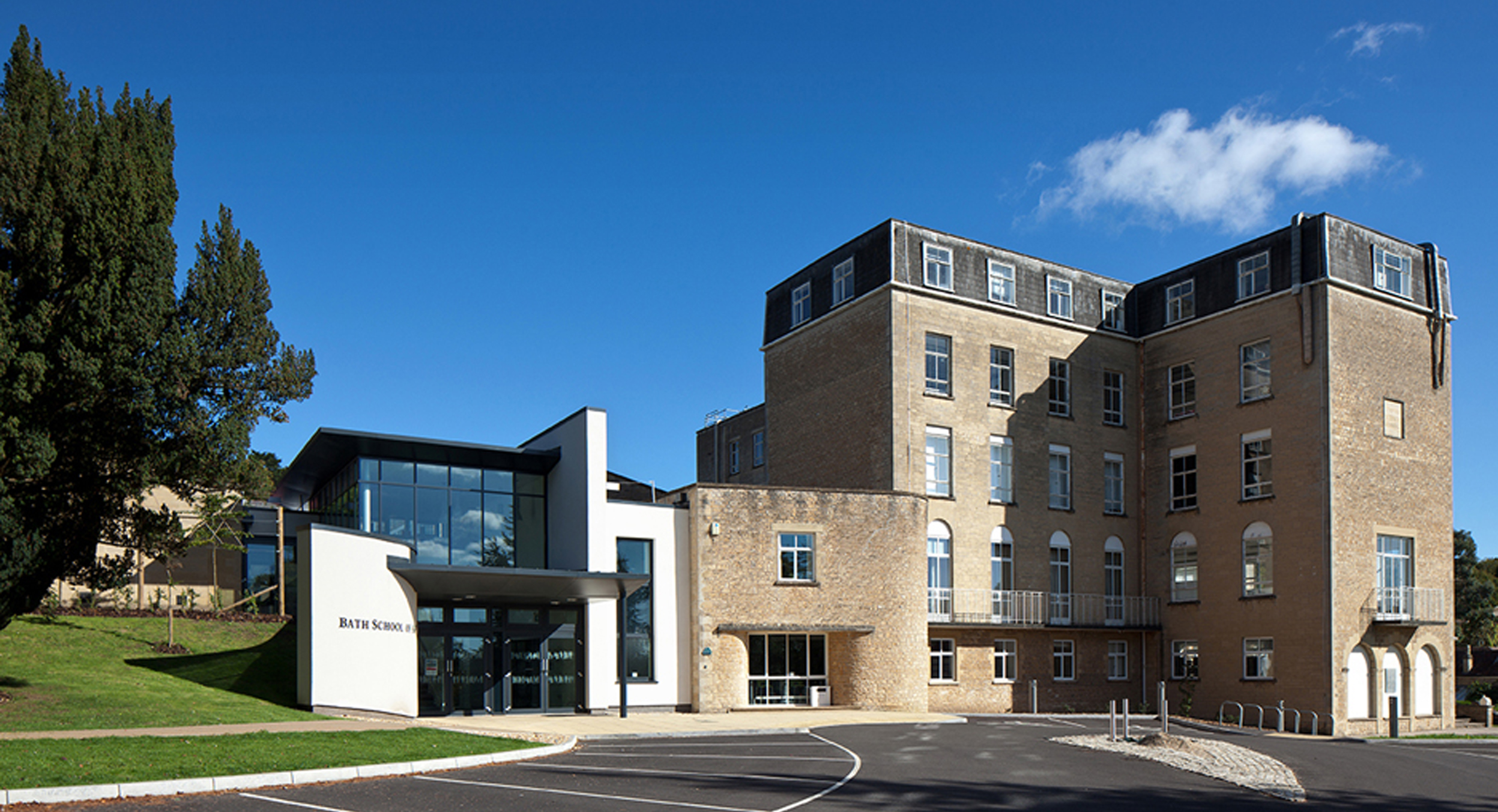
Sion Hill

The Sion Hill campus in the north of Bath, in the Lansdown district, previously housed the Bath School of Art and Design and the majority of art and design courses were taught here before moving to Locksbrook Campus in 2019. It is now home to the university's education space for its PGCE courses.

Its history extends to the original Bath School of Art which was founded in 1852. One of the earliest Masters of the school was Anthony Carey Stannus, an Irish painter noted for marine scenes, who later helped establish a society which evolved into the Royal Ulster Academy.

Until 2009, the university also owned the nearby Somerset Place. The sale of this listed Georgian crescent was intended to finance a new campus in the city centre. This development, alongside the Dyson School of Design Innovation, did not proceed due to planning issues relating to the chosen riverside site.

=== Corsham Court, Corsham ===
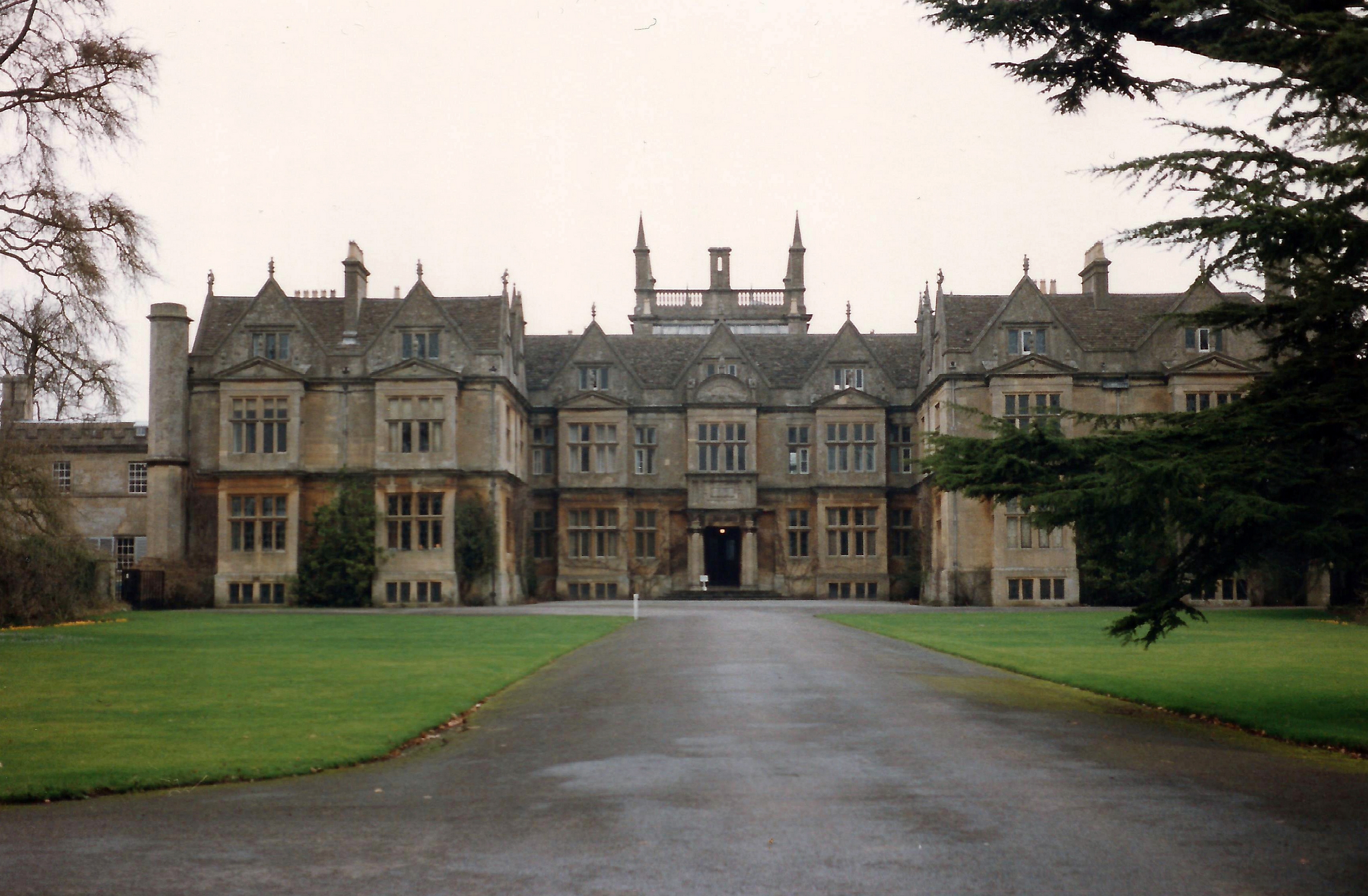
Corsham Court

At Corsham, about 8 miles (13 km) north-east of Bath, the university has since 2008 used buildings attached to Corsham Court, a Grade I listed house which dates back to 1582. Corsham Court Centre is primarily the base for postgraduate research students (PhD and MPhil), who have access to study and meeting spaces, a library, seminar rooms, and research development support. The site also houses the university's Research Support Office, the Graduate College, the Wellcome Trust-funded Disabled Researchers Network, and the university's art collection, managed by the Bath School of Writing, Publishing and Humanities.

=== Hackney, London ===
Opened in 2024, the University Centre in London was born out of a partnership between New City College and Bath Spa University. The jointly operated University Centre, on Hoxton High Street, is home to Bath Spa University London (Hackney) and offers a combination of degree courses with professional development programmes and short courses.

=== Canary Wharf, London ===
Opened in 2025, Bath Spa University London (Canary Wharf) is in the heart of the city's financial district and is home to over 2000 adult learners who are studying BSU degrees in Health and Social Care Management, Business and Management and Computing.

=== Additional teaching sites ===
The university maintains smaller satellite teaching spaces around Bath for use by students on certain courses, often those that require large amounts of space that are not available at the other campuses.

- Burdall's Yard, Bath is an Arts Centre for the School of Music and Performing Arts. The centre is used as a teaching, rehearsal and performance space and also hosts cultural events. These have included Party in the city (Bath Festival) and a UK Songwriting Festival gig with singer/songwriter Eddi Reader.
- Oldfield Park Theatre Workshops. Located near the city centre, the university's theatre workshop facilities include carpentry workshop and separate carpentry teaching space, a costume making workshop, prop-making workshop, rehearsal studios, ‘black box’ space with a truss-mounted LED lighting system, breakout spaces, quiet study areas, lecture and seminar rooms and an IT Suite.
- The Studio at Palace Yard Mews. The Studio provides a space for local micro-businesses, Bath Spa University students, academics, and graduates to work on projects and ideas which focus on creativity and technology. It is also a venue to share learning through regular workshops, events and activities which are open to the wider community.
- Artswork Media Ltd at Paintworks, Bristol is the university's media production company that is run by media professionals and third year students. It offers training, professional practice and experiential learning for students of various programmes. It provides a production office, edit suites, lighting equipment and video cameras.

== Academic profile ==
Rankings
National rankings
- Complete (2027): 92
- Guardian (2027): 59
- Times / Sunday Times (2027): 123

=== Partnership and collaboration ===
The university has formed partnerships with a number of regional Further Education Colleges and institutions. Under the partnership, students take the first year of their higher education course in their local college and, if successful, the rest of their course at Bath Spa University. The British and Irish Modern Music Institute campus in Bristol has all of its courses verified by Bath Spa University.

The partners are:

- Circomedia
- Bath College
- City of Bristol College
- New College, Swindon
- Weston College
- Wiltshire College at Trowbridge and Salisbury
- British and Irish Modern Music Institute in Bristol

== Student life ==
=== Student accommodation ===
The university currently offers accommodation to 2,264 students in several locations around the Bath area, as well as on its main Newton Park campus.

==== Newton Park Campus ====
The Newton Park Campus houses 868 students in single, shared and en-suite study bedrooms. The accommodation forms two groups of buildings at either end of the campus, known as Lakeside and Gardens. Bus stops by the library building and Lakeside accommodation service the U5 bus. Both groups of accommodation have access to laundrette facilities. Because of the limited availability of parking, students living on campus are not permitted to bring a car, however bicycle racks and some motorcycle parking spaces are available.

In June 2013, work began on the development of a new "student village" in the main Newton Park campus, known as Gardens, which houses 561 first year students in separate "houses" of up to ten students. Building work was completed during the summer of 2014 in time for the start of the academic year in October. Work on the surrounding landscaping and car parks was completed during early 2015.

Mail services at the university are handled at a building called 'The Vinery', which also contains the estates and management team and is located adjacent to the Students' Union building, and next to the estates and management workshops and garages. The university also has two Amazon Lockers on campus, situated in the Refectory and outside Stanton building.

==== City accommodation ====
- Waterside Court: Offers 316 en-suite bed spaces and is run by student accommodation company Unite Students. It is next to the Charlton Court accommodation on the Lower Bristol Road, and is only a short distance from the centre of Bath and has a nearby bus stop with buses running to the centre as well as the university itself.
- Charlton Court: Offers 294 en-suite bed spaces and is run by Unite Students. It is located next to the Waterside Court accommodation on the Lower Bristol Road.
- Twerton Mill: In 2015 the university acquired 277 rooms at the new Twerton Mill development on the Lower Bristol Road. The development is a carless site, with only four parking spaces: three disabled spaces and one maintenance space. This development consists of a mixture of en-suite and traditional town houses with shared bathrooms and kitchens.
- Bankside House: 10 flats with a total of 40 student bed spaces. It is near the Sion Hill campus, the Circus, Dartmouth Avenue and City of Bath College.

=== Students' Union ===
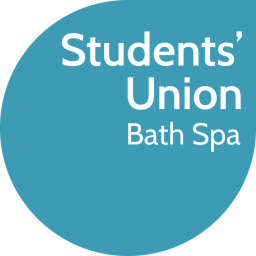
The Students' Union's logo as of 2013

The main Students' Union facilities are at the Newton Park campus, although the Union maintains a presence in all campuses. The Main union building runs a bar, café, gym and shop, and hosts regular events throughout the academic year. There are 12 sports societies, 43 interest societies and 16 sports clubs run by the union, many of which compete in the BUCS. The sports facilities include rugby and football pitches at the top of the campus, as well as a netball court and changing facilities inside the walled garden adjacent to the union building. The walled garden itself is also a social space, featuring BBQs, games tables, seating and tables, a small pond, greenhouses and small allotment style areas. The Union is in charge of organising the Freshers events, as well as the Winter and Summer balls. It also has facilities to run health campaigns and give academic advice to students, volunteering and skill development opportunities, travel opportunities, and it liaises directly with the university and organisations nationally and in the local area to campaign about and discuss issues that affect students.

The Union also has its own student card called Student Zest, founded by students in 2012 which offers discounts on goods and services offered in over 100 local businesses. There is a dedicated website that deals with matters concerning this card.

The Students' Union building at Newton Park campus was refurbished during the summer of 2014, doubling the size of the shop, reconfiguring the bar/cafe area, improving the gym, and updating the toilet facilities. There is also a new footpath around the front entrance of the building, improving access. The Students' Union is also working with the university, the student body, and architects, to produce a long-term plan to completely rebuild the Union.

=== Alumni community ===
Bath Spa University's growing alumni community is a network of over 80,000 graduates, former students and staff, honorary graduates, friends and benefactors. It publishes an annual alumni magazine and promotes raising philanthropic income for a wide range of important projects for the university, particularly the Bath Spa Students Fund and bursaries. The president is Mary Berry, who is a former student of the Bath College of Domestic Science and is the recipient of an honorary doctorate from the university.

=== Oak Tree Day Nursery ===
Oak Tree Day Nursery was established in 1995 and operates from two adjoining houses in the parkland grounds of the university's Newton Park campus. It is a full day-care nursery offering both full and part-time places for the children of university staff and students as well as the local community. It has won numerous awards, including The Baby Quality Award in 2011, the Children's and Young People's Rights Gold Award in 2012, and the Director of Public Health Award in 2013.

== Chancellors and Vice Chancellors ==
=== Chancellors ===
- Sharanjit Leyl – May 2024 to present
- Jeremy Irons – Autumn 2016 to Summer 2020

=== Vice Chancellors ===
- Georgina Andrews – January 2025 to present
- Sue Rigby – January 2018 to December 2024
- Nick Foskett (Interim Vice-Chancellor) – 2017 to 2018
- Christina Slade – January 2012 to August 2017
- Frank Morgan – 1997 to December 2011

== Notable people ==
=== Academic staff ===
- Naomi Alderman, novelist
- David Almond, novelist
- Joe Bennett, musician and writer
- Dexter Dalwood, artist
- Mahinda Deegalle, scholar and writer
- Carrie Etter, poet
- Nathan Filer, novelist and poet
- Aminatta Forna, novelist
- Jeremy Gardiner, modern British landscape painter
- Maggie Gee, novelist
- Eliane Glaser, writer and broadcaster
- David Harsent, poet and TV scriptwriter
- Samantha Harvey, novelist, winner of 2024 Booker Prize
- Philip Hensher, novelist, critic and journalist
- William Hughes, editor and critic
- Nicholas Jose, novelist
- Tim Liardet, poet and critic
- John Newsinger, author
- Olivette Otele, the first black woman to become professor of history in UK Higher Education
- Richard Parfitt, musician
- Kate Pullinger, novelist
- James Saunders, composer
- Gavin Turk, artist
- Steve Voake, children's author
- Fay Weldon, novelist
- Gerard Woodward, novelist and poet
- Lance Workman, psychologist and writer

=== Alumni ===
- Nadine Ames, Indonesian actress, model and Miss Universe Indonesia 2011
- Mary Berry, food writer
- Harrison Birtwistle, composer
- Manolo Blahnik, shoe designer
- Glenn Brown, English painter, Turner Prize winner
- Tracey Corderoy, children's writer
- Sir Graeme Davies, engineer, academic, and former Vice-Chancellor of the University of Liverpool, the University of Glasgow and the University of London
- Roger Deakins, cinematographer
- Peter Flannery, scriptwriter, author of Our Friends in the North
- Laura Ford, artist
- Jason Gardener, athlete, Olympic gold medallist
- Kate Garraway, television presenter
- William Harbutt, artist
- Ian Hargreaves, journalist
- Salima Hashmi, artist, cultural writer, painter and an anti-nuclear weapon activist.
- Mo Hayder, British crime novelist
- John Hitchens, artist, painter
- Sir Howard Hodgkin, artist, Turner Prize winner
- Ema "Emika" Jolly, electronic music producer
- Elizabeth Kay, writer and author of The Divide trilogy
- Phil Kelly, expressionist painter
- Kill It Kid, blues/grunge/Americana band, signed with EMI
- Alastair King, TV and film composer,
- Daren King, contemporary English novelist
- Jan Linton, electronic music producer and singer/songwriter
- Joanna MacGregor, classical, jazz and contemporary pianist, and artistic director of the Bath International Music Festival
- Sir Donald Maitland, British diplomat and British Prime Minister Edward Heath's press secretary 1970 to 1974
- Gordon Moakes, Bloc Party bassist and backing singer
- Fred V & Grafix, drum and bass duo
- Sally Nicholls, prize-winning British children's book author
- Edward Piper, painter
- Joanna Pocock, writer and film-maker
- Miller Puckette, mathematician and computer music researcher
- Peter Randall-Page, artist
- Simon Relph, assistant film director and producer
- Dame Anita Roddick, businesswoman, founder of The Body Shop
- Davide Rossi, violinist, string arranger, composer and a record producer, working with Goldfrapp and Coldplay.
- Axel Scheffler, illustrator
- Tristram Shapeero, television director
- Rob Magnuson Smith, author
- Sir William Stubbs, educator and former Rector of the University of the Arts London.
- Judith Trim
- Jules Williams, writer, Director, Producer author of The Weigh Forward
- Evie Wyld, novelist and author
- Jed Elliot, bassist in The Struts

== See also ==
- Armorial of UK universities
- College of Education
- List of universities in the United Kingdom
