= Newton Park =

Country house in Newton St Loe, Somerset, England

Coordinates: 51.37566°N 2.43834°W

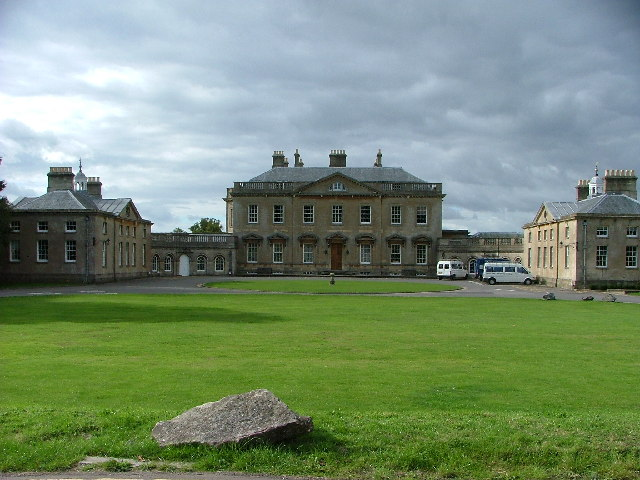
Newton Park

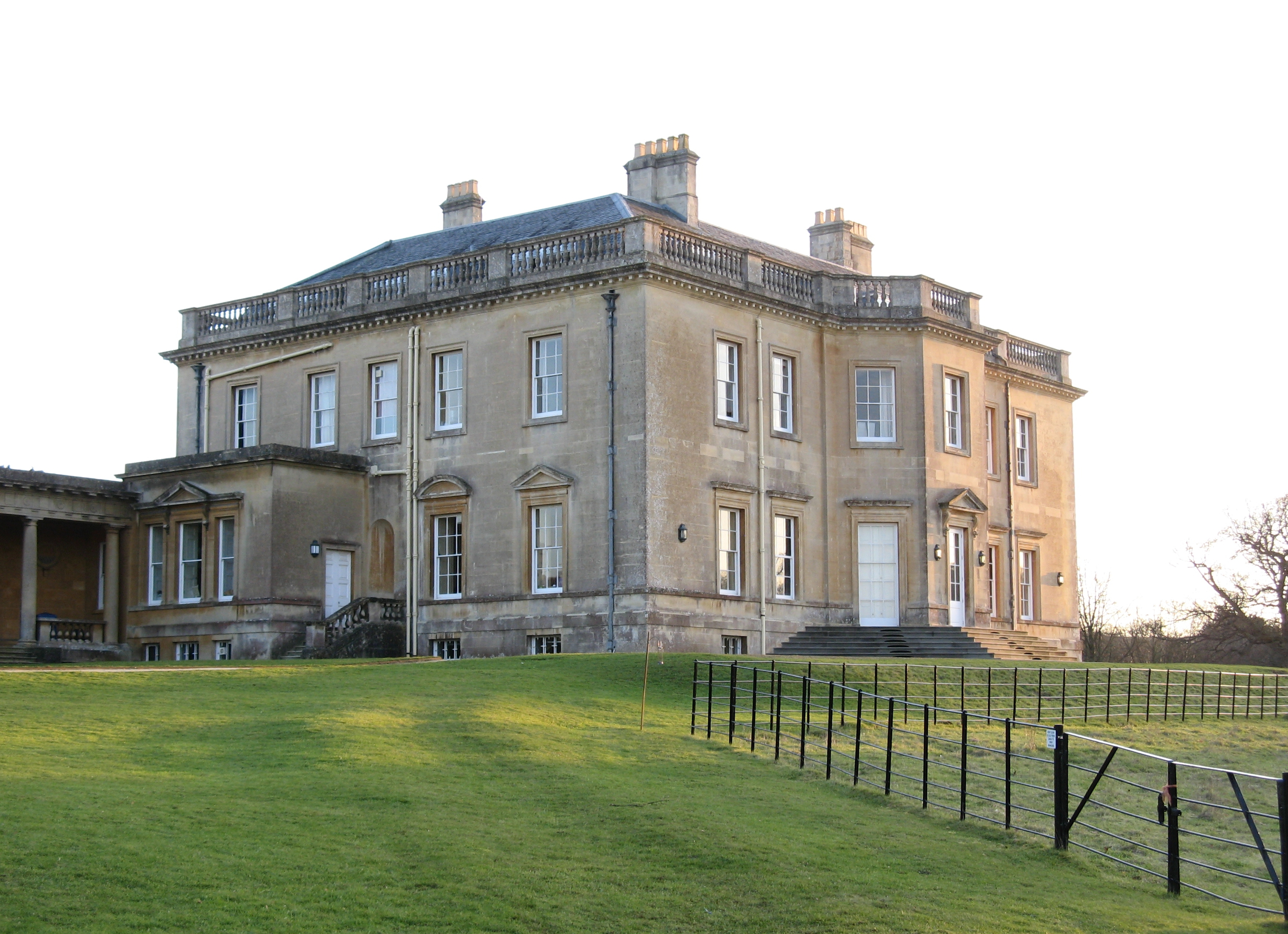
Newton Park, viewed from north

Newton Park is an 18th-century Grade I listed country house in the parish of Newton St Loe, Somerset, England, situated 4 miles (6.4 km) west of Bath.

== History ==
Newton Park was built in 1762–5 by Joseph Langton (grandson of Joseph Langton (c.1637–1719), of Newton Park, Member of Parliament for Bath from 1690 to 1695,) to the design of Stiff Leadbetter. Newton Park was the ancestral home of the women's rights campaigner Lady Anna and M.P. William Henry Powell Gore-Langton (1824 1873).

The house was used as a Red Cross hospital to house Australian and New Zealand troops in World War I. Newton Park is currently home to the administrative staff of Bath Spa University

== Grounds and park ==
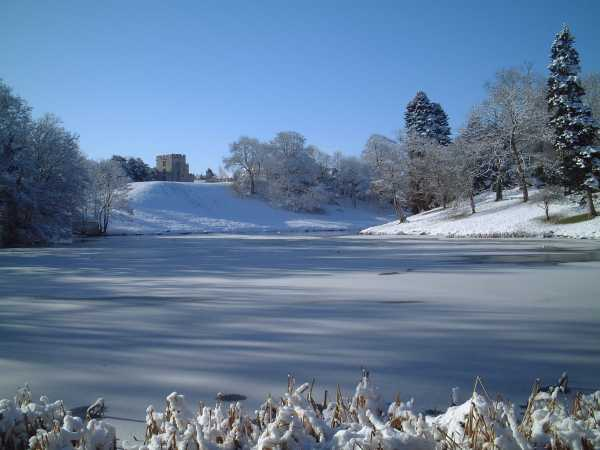
The upper lake at Newton Park

The estate includes a landscaped park, near the village of Newton St Loe, designed by Capability Brown, and now owned by the Duchy of Cornwall. It was laid out on land containing the 14th century keep and gateway of St Loe's Castle, a fortified medieval manor house, Elizabethan farm buildings, and various enclosed gardens. The park is today bounded on the north side by the A39 Wells Road and reaches right up to the residential roads of the village of Newton St Loe to its east, and very close to the village of Stanton Prior in the west and south west.

Some of the park is leased to Bath Spa University, which maintains the historic Georgian manor house and ornamental lakes, as well as Newton Saint Loe Castle. The park is Grade II* listed. Corston Brook flows through the west of the park and can be described as terraced, with numerous weirs, which have allowed for the creation of two large fish ponds, naturally shaped, by the main buildings. 500 metres north of the park the brook feeds into the Avon.

The north-east point of the park narrowly excludes The Globe, a public house on the roundabout junction of the A4 road, which is Grade II listed and a point on the edge of minor woods around the northern grounds marks the start of the A39 road which extends from the grounds (just north of a listed pair of gatepiers, railings, outpiers and flanking quadrant walls to the park) SSW then W to Falmouth, Cornwall.
