= Newton St Loe Castle =

Castle in Somerset, England

- Newton St Loe, Somerset
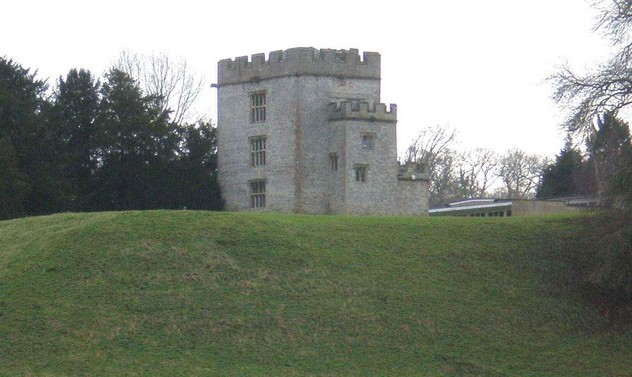
- Keep of Newton St Loe Castle

Site information
- Type: Fortified manor house
- Owner: Bath Spa University

Location
- Shown within Somerset and the British Isles
- Location within Somerset
- Coordinates: 51.37402°N 2.44096°W
- Grid reference: ST694639

Site history
- Materials: Stone

Newton St Loe Castle was a fortified manor house in the village of Newton St Loe, Somerset, England. Parts of it survive: a 14th-century keep and 15th-century gatehouse, both Grade I listed buildings.

== Description ==
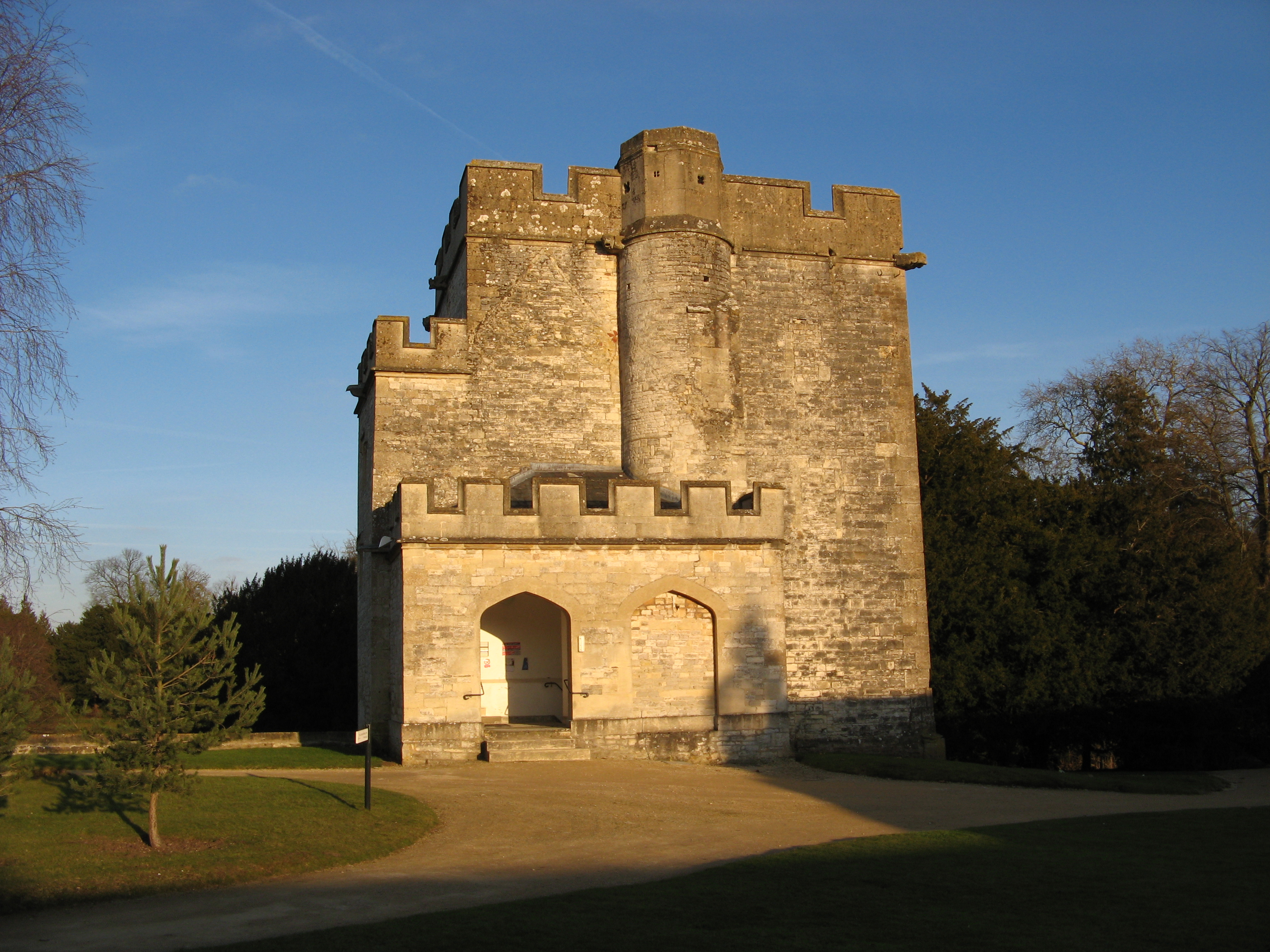
View of the west, entrance, side

The lands around Newton St. Loe (Newton Seyntloo) were owned by the de Paveleys of Westbury, Wiltshire. John de Paveley died without an heir, so his lands passed through marriage to John de Sancto Laudo, a knight who gained recognition for his actions at Acre during the Crusades.

Newton St Loe Castle was built as a fortified manor house, probably in the 12th century, surrounded by Newton Park, then a medieval deer park. During its time the castle was known as St. John's keep, for apparently holding King John under arrest by William de Sancto Laudo. At the start of the 14th century, a keep was built on the site as part of a wider programme of work by the St Loe family, creating a rectangular, courtyard castle with four corner towers, protected by a ditch on three sides. In 1375 the site was inherited by Elizabeth, the last of the St Loe family, who married William, Baron Botreaux. Sir Walter Hungerford built a new gatehouse at the castle during the first half of the 15th century, which features turrets, machicolations and an early gunport.

== Later uses ==
In the 19th century, the castle and the surrounding park were heavily landscaped to produce the current country house and gardens; only the renovated keep and the gatehouse survive intact, although a nearby mound marks one of the corner towers of the 14th-century castle.

During the 1970s and 1980s the castle was home to the Religious Studies department of Bath College of Higher Education (now Bath Spa University).

In 1984 the keep and gatehouse were separately designated as Grade I listed buildings. Today the site is used by Bath Spa University.

== See also ==
- Castles in Great Britain and Ireland
- List of castles in England

== Bibliography ==
- Dunning, Robert. (1995) Somerset Castles. Tiverton, UK: Somerset Books. ISBN 978-0-86183-278-1.
- Kenyon, John R. (1977). "Early Gunports," Fort 4, pp74–84.
- Pettifer, Adrian. (2002) English Castles: a Guide by Counties. Woodbridge, UK: Boydell Press. ISBN 978-0-85115-782-5.
- Youngs, Susan M. and John Clark. (1981) "Medieval Britain in 1980," Medieval Archaeology 25, pp. 166–288.
