= George James Robarts =

British politician

George James Robarts CB

Member of Parliament for Wallingford
- In office 1820–1826 Serving with William Hughes
- Preceded by: William Hughes; Ebenezer Maitland
- Succeeded by: William Hughes; Robert Knight

Personal details
- Born: 1782
- Died: 16 October 1829 (aged 46–47)
- Political party: Whig
- Relations: Abraham Wildey Robarts (brother); William Tierney Robarts (brother); George Tierney (uncle)
- Children: 2
- Parent(s): Abraham Roberts; Sabine Tierney

George James Robarts CB (c. 1782 – 16 October 1829), was a British politician who served Parliament for Wallingford.

== Early life ==
Robarts was born in c. 1782 into a well known, and wealthy, political family. He was the second son of Abraham Roberts and his wife Sabine Tierney (sister of George Tierney). Among his brothers were Abraham Wildey Robarts, William Tierney Robarts, and James Thomas Robarts of the East India Company.

== Career ==
Robarts served in the Peninsular War and commanded the Prince of Wales's Hussars at the Battle of Morales (a cavalry skirmish between the Duke of Wellington's vanguard and the rear guard of the French army on 2 June 1813 near the village of Morales which is in the vicinity of Toro, Zamora in Spain), and fought at the Battle of Vitoria on 21 June 1813. He was promoted to Lt.-Col. Robarts was transferred to the 24th Hussars on 12 November 1814.

== Personal life ==
Robarts died unmarried with two illegitimate children from his relationship with Mary Ann Harben:

- Georgiana Charlotte Harben Robarts (c. 1820–1832), who died young.
- James George Harben Robarts (1823–1886)

Parliament of the United Kingdom
Preceded by William Hughes; Ebenezer Maitland	Member of Parliament for Wallingford; 1818 – 1837; With: William Hughes	Succeeded by William Hughes; Robert Knight
