= Dilke =

Dilke may refer to:

- Dilke, Saskatchewan, a village in Canada
- Dilke baronets, a title in the Baronetage of the United Kingdom
- Lady Dilke (born Emilia Francis Strong; 1840–1904), British author, art historian, feminist and trade unionist

== See also ==
- Charles Dilke (disambiguation)
