= Wallingford (constituency) =

Parliamentary constituency in the United Kingdom 1801-1885

- Former borough constituency for the House of Commons

1295–1885
- Replaced by: Abingdon

Wallingford was a parliamentary constituency in England, represented in the House of Commons of the Parliament of England until 1707, then of the Parliament of Great Britain from 1707 to 1800 and of the Parliament of the United Kingdom from 1801 to 1885.

It was a parliamentary borough created in 1295, centred on the market town Wallingford in Berkshire (now in Oxfordshire). It used to return two Members of Parliament (MPs) to the House of Commons; this was cut to one in 1832, and the constituency was abolished in 1885. The town of Wallingford is now within the constituency of Didcot and Wantage.

== History ==
Before 1832 the borough consisted only of the town of Wallingford, which by the 19th century was divided into four parishes. The franchise was limited to (male) inhabitants paying scot and lot, a local tax. Namier and Brooke estimated that the number of electors in the mid-18th century was about 200; but the number fluctuated considerably with the fortunes of the town, which had no manufacturing interests and considerable unemployment at some periods. There were never enough voters to avoid the risk of corruption, and systematic bribery generally prevailed, with anything up to 150 votes being bought and sold at any one election. (In 1754, Thomas Sewell, one of the Whig candidates, spent over £1000 of his own money and not only was this reimbursed from the "secret service" funds but the government spent further money unsuccessfully attempting to secure him a seat in Wallingford.) By the 19th century Wallingford was regarded as one of the worst of the rotten boroughs, and Oldfield recorded in 1816 that the price of a vote was 40 guineas.

The 1831 census found the borough had a population of about 2,500, and 485 houses. Under the Reform Act 1832, the constituency was allowed to survive and to keep one of its two MPs, but the boundaries were considerably extended, taking in the Wallingford Castle precincts, which had previously been excluded, and all or part of a dozen neighbouring parishes including Benson and Crowmarsh, and part of Cholsey. This change of boundaries almost trebled the population, but the effect on the electorate was much smaller. According to the reports on which the Reform Act was based, Wallingford had about 300 men qualified to vote in 1831 (though no more than 230 had ever voted in the previous thirty years). Yet despite the widening of the right to vote, which preserved the ancient right voters of the borough while adding new electors on an occupation franchise, there were only 453 names on the 1832 electoral register for the extended borough. (Stooks Smith records that 166 of these claimed their vote as scot and lot payers, while 287 qualified as £10 occupiers; but many of the latter group presumably paid scot and lot within the old boundaries and could have voted before the Reform Act.)

In 1868 the franchise was further extended and there were 942 registered electors, but the constituency was much too small to survive the Third Reform Act, and was abolished with effect from the general election of 1885. The constituency was mostly included in the new Berkshire North or Abingdon county constituency, but Benson and the other parts of the extended borough on the Oxfordshire side of the Thames were placed in the Oxfordshire South or Henley division of that county.

== Members of Parliament ==
=== 1295–1640 ===
Parliament	First member	Second member
1302	Osbert de Notele	William Clericus
1304	Nicholas de la Barre	William Mareschal
1306	Nicholas de la Barre	Richard de Cippenham
1306	John Mariot	Osbert de Notele
1307	Nicholas de la Barre	John Mariot
1309	Thomas de Morton	Thomas Bene
1311	Nicholas de la Barre	Osbert de Notele
1311	Nicholas de la Barre	Osbert de Notele
1312	Nicholas de la Barre	Richard de Cippenham
1313	Nicholas de la Barre	William Butty
1314	Walter at Russhe	William Butty
1314–5	Osbert de Notele	Thomas Bone
1318	Thomas Garston	Thomas Bone
1327	John Osbern	Richard Grotard
1320	Thomas Bone	Thomas Bortorat
1321	Nicholas de la Barre	John Osbern
1322	Reginald de Bradebourn	Alexander le Vacher
1322	Thomas at Gaston	Alexander le Vacher
1323	Osbert de Notele	Reginald de Bradebourn
1325	Robert Butty	Richard Reswald
1327	John Osbern	Roger de Saucer
1328	Thomas Bone	John Osbern
1328	John Osbern	John Breton
1329	John Mariot	William Arnyot
1330	John Mariot	Robert Butty
1331	John Mariot	Robert Butty
1331	Thomas Bone	William de Dene
1333	John Mariot	John de Preston
1335	William de Cornwall	Philip Preston
1335	William de Cornwall	Thomas Bone
1336	William de Cornwall	Edmund Bonham
1336	William de Cornwall	Thomas Bone
1337	John Mariot	William de Cornwall
1337	John Mariot	William de Cornwall
1338	William le Goldsmith	John Berewyk
1338	John Mariot	William Arnyat
1339	John Stacy	Thomas Batheshall
1339	Robert Butty	William le Goldsmith
1341	John Mariot	Robert Butty
1344	Roger Tylewyne	John Berewyk
1347	John atte Ruysshe	John at Barston
1348	Philip de Preston	William le Goldsmith
1350–1	William Harewell	Thomas Reynald
1355	John Louch	John Brightwalton
1357–8	Robert Berot	John Heronn
1360	John Louch	John Andrew
1360	Nicholas Payable	Roger Preston
1362	William Harewell	Henry Redyng
1363	William Harewell	Alexander Absolan
1364	John James	Roger Preston
1366	John James	Nicholas Payable
1368	Nicholas Tanner	
1369	John James	Nicholas Tanner
1370	John James	Richard Attefelde
1371	John James	Richard Attefelde
1372	Richard Attefelde	Roger Melbourne
1373	Thomas Grove	Roger Arnyate
1375	John James	Richard Attefelde
1376	Thomas Beneshef	Henry de Bedyng
1377	Thomas Reynald	Richard Attefelde
1378	Roger Arnyate	
1379–80	Roger Melbourne	Walter Hervy
1381	Roger Melbourne	
1383	Thomas Grove	Robert Oxenford
1383	Roger Melbourne	John Kerre
1383	Roger Arnyate	John Kerre
1384	Thomas Grove	John Lyttel
1384	Thomas Grove	Walter Harby
1385	Thomas Beneshef	Robert Oxenford
1386	Thomas Beneshef	John Derby
1387	Thomas Beneshef	Roger Melbourne
1388	Richard de Brugge	John Bernard
1389	John Cotterell	Roger Melbourne
1391	Richard Hovelock	William Hende
1392	John Cotterell	William Cary
1393	John Cotterell	John Derby
1394	John Cotterell	John Derby
1396	John Cotterell	Robert Oxenford
1397	John Cotterell	Walter Colete
1399	Walter Hervy	John Culham
1405–6	William Essex	Walter Hyndon
1407	John Culham	William Clowd
1409–10	John Cotterell	William Cotterell
1413	Thomas Ravening	Lewis John
1413–4	Robert Deffonte	Robert Carswell
1419	John Denby	Richard Algate
1420	John Cotterell	Richard Algate
1421	John Cotterell	John Mercham
1421	John Warfeld	William Bodyngton
1422	John Warfeld	Laurence Haweman
1423	Laurence Haweman	Henry Payne
1429	John Mercham	Thomas Jones
1425–6	Laurence Haweman	John Denby
1427	John Warfeld	William Borde
1429	John Warfeld	Laurence Haweman
1430–1	John Warfeld	Thomas Ramsey
1432	John Warfeld	William Bodyngton
1433	John Warfeld	William Bodyngton
1435	John Warfeld	William Borde
1436–7	John Warfeld	William Borde
1441–2	John Bruggewater	John Stoke
1446	John Stoke	Robert Dalby
1448	Thomas Carlyll	Henry Herleton
1449	Robert Hopton	Thomas Browne
1450	Henry Spencer	Richard Bulstrode
1452–3	Thomas Preston	John Burgh
1459	Richard Houghton	Henry Spencer
1460	William Bedeston	John Bydon
1467	John Colynggrugge	Robert Hopton
1472	Thomas Roos	Thomas Ashynden
1477–8	Thomas Wode	Thomas Vynsent
1529	Edward Chamberlain	Godelacius Overton
1536	Thomas Denton	
1547	Sir Thomas Parry	Henry Hontley
1552-3	Sir Thomas Parry	George Wright
1553	George Wright	Edmund Plowden
1554	Edmund Ashfield	Anthony Butler
1554	Edmund Ashfield	Robert Cockson
1555	Sir Thomas Parry	Thomas Mynde
1557	Thomas Mynde	Radulphus Pollyngton
1558-9	Thomas Mynde	John Fortesque
1563	William Dunch	Thomas Browne
1571	Sir Edmund Dunch	Thomas Dudley
1572	Thomas Digges	John Fortesque
1584	Christopher Edmonds	Richard Knollys
1586	Richard Knollys	Thomas Stampe
1588–9	Michael Molyns	Thomas Stampe
1592–3	Thomas Fortescue	Anthony Bacon
1597	Thomas Fortescue	Owen Oglethorpe
1601	(Sir John Herbert) sat for Glamorgan and replaced by Thomas Fortescue	Henry Doyley
1604	Sir William Dunch	Griffith Payne
1614	Sir Carew Reynell	Sir George Simeon
1621–1622	Sir George Simeon	Samuel Dunch
1624	(Sir Edward Howard) sat for Calne, Wiltshire and replaced by Sir Anthony Forrest	Sir George Simeon
1625	Sir Anthony Forrest	Michael Molyns
1625	Sir Anthony Forrest	Unton Croke
1628–1629	Sir Robert Knollys	Edmund Dunch
1629–1640	No parliaments summoned	

=== 1640–1832 ===
- 1640 (Apr): Edmund Dunch (Parliamentarian); Unton Croke
- 1640 (Nov): Edmund Dunch; Thomas Howard (Royalist) – disabled to sit, January 1644
- 1645: Edmund Dunch; Robert Packer – excluded in Pride's Purge, December 1648
- 1648: Edmund Dunch (one seat only)
- 1653: Wallingford not represented in Barebones Parliament
- 1654: Wallingford not represented in first Protectorate Parliament
- 1656: Wallingford not represented in second Protectorate Parliament
- 1659: William Cook; Walter Bigg

Year	First member	First party	Second member	Second party
April 1660	Robert Packer		Hungerford Dunch (Note: Dunch was also elected for Cricklade, which he chose to represent, and did not sit for Wallingford)	
June 1660	Robert Packer		Thomas Saunders	
1661	Robert Packer		Hon. George Fane	
1663	Robert Packer		Sir John Bennet	
February 1679	John Stone		Scorey Barker	
August 1679	William Lenthall		Scorey Barker	
1681	Taverner Harris		Scorey Barker	
1685	John Stone		John Holloway	
1689	Thomas Tipping		William Jennens	
1690	John Wallis		William Jennens	
1695	Sir Thomas Tipping		William Jennens	
1698	Sir Thomas Tipping		Richard Pye	
1701	William Jennens		Thomas Renda	
1705	William Jennens		Clement Kent	
1708	William Jennens		Grey Neville	
1709	Thomas Renda		Grey Neville	
1710	Thomas Renda		Simon Harcourt	
1713	Richard Bigg		Simon Harcourt	
1714	Richard Bigg		Thomas Renda	
1715	Edmund Dunch	Whig	William Hucks	
1719	Henry Grey	Whig	William Hucks	
1722	Viscount Parker		William Hucks	
1727	George Lewen		William Hucks	
1734	Thomas Tower		William Hucks	
1740	Thomas Tower		Joseph Townsend	
1741	John Bance		John Rush	
1747	Joseph Townsend		Richard Tonson	
1754	John Hervey		Richard Ashcroft	Bedford Whig
1761	John Hervey		Sir John Gibbons, Bt	
1765	Sir George Pigot, Bt (Note: The Lord Pigot from 1766)		Sir John Gibbons, Bt	
1768	Robert Pigot		John Aubrey	
1772	John Cator		John Aubrey	
1774	John Cator		Sir Robert Barker	
1780	Chaloner Arcedeckne		John Aubrey	
1784	Chaloner Arcedeckne		Sir Francis Sykes, Bt	
1784	Thomas Aubrey		Sir Francis Sykes, Bt	
1790	Nathaniel Wraxall		Sir Francis Sykes, Bt	
1794	Francis Sykes	Tory	Sir Francis Sykes, Bt	
1796	The Lord Eardley	Whig	Sir Francis Sykes, Bt	Tory
1802	William Hughes	Whig	Sir Francis Sykes, Bt	Tory
1804	William Hughes	Whig	George Galway Mills	
1806	William Hughes	Whig	Richard Benyon	Tory
1812	William Hughes	Whig	Ebenezer Maitland	Tory
1820	William Hughes	Whig	George James Robarts	Whig
1826	William Hughes	Whig	Robert Knight	Whig
1831	Thomas Leigh	Whig	Robert Knight	Whig

- Constituency reduced to one seat, (1832)

=== 1832–1885 ===
Year	Member	Party	Note
1832	William Seymour Blackstone	Tory	
1834	William Seymour Blackstone	Conservative	
1852	Richard Malins	Conservative	
1865	Sir Wentworth Dilke, Bt	Liberal	
1868	Stanley Vickers	Conservative	Died 24 February 1872
1872	Edward Wells	Conservative	
1880	Walter Wren	Liberal	Election declared void, on petition, 19 June 1880
1880	Pandeli Ralli	Liberal	

- Constituency abolished (1885)

== Elections ==
Electoral system: The block vote electoral system was used in two seat elections and first past the post for single member elections. Each voter had up to as many votes as there were seats to be filled. Votes had to be cast by a spoken declaration, in public, at the hustings (until the secret ballot was introduced in 1872).

Percentage change calculations: Where there was only one candidate of a party in successive elections, for the same number of seats, change is calculated on the party percentage vote. Where there was more than one candidate, in one or both successive elections for the same number of seats, then change is calculated on the individual percentage vote.

Sources (unless otherwise indicated): (1754–1784) Namier and Brooke; (1790–1831) Stooks Smith; (1832–1880) Craig. Where Stooks Smith gives additional information or differs from the other sources this is indicated in a note after the result.

Swing: Positive swing is from Whig/Liberal to Tory/Conservative. Negative swing is from Tory/Conservative to Whig/Liberal.

1750-1760s – 1770-1780s –

1790s – 1800s – 1810s – 1820s – 1830s – 1840s – 1850s – 1860s – 1870s – 1880s

=== Elections in the 1750s and 1760s ===
General election 15 April 1754: Wallingford (2 seats)
Party	Candidate	Votes	%	±%
Nonpartisan	John Hervey	Elected	N/A	N/A
Nonpartisan	Richard Ashcroft	Elected	N/A	N/A
Nonpartisan	Thomas Sewell	Defeated	N/A	N/A
Nonpartisan	The Viscount Castlecomer ^{1}	Defeated	N/A	N/A

General election 25 March 1761: Wallingford (2 seats)
Party	Candidate	Votes	%	±%
Nonpartisan	John Hervey	Unopposed		
Nonpartisan	John Gibbons	Unopposed		

- Death of Hervey

By-Election 15 January 1765: Wallingford
Party	Candidate	Votes	%	±%
Nonpartisan	George Pigot	Unopposed		
Nonpartisan hold				

- Creation of Pigot as the 1st Baron Pigot in the Peerage of Ireland, 1766

General election 16 March 1768: Wallingford (2 seats)
Party	Candidate	Votes	%	±%
Nonpartisan	John Aubrey	69	39.7	N/A
Nonpartisan	Robert Pigot	67	38.5	N/A
Nonpartisan	John Gibbons	38	21.8	N/A
Turnout		174	N/A	N/A

=== Elections in the 1770s and 1780s ===
- Seat vacated on the appointment of Pigot as Warden of the Mint

By-Election 27 January 1772: Wallingford
Party	Candidate	Votes	%	±%
Nonpartisan	John Cator	90	52.9	N/A
Nonpartisan	Robert Pigot	80	47.1	N/A
Majority		10	5.9	N/A
Turnout		170	N/A	N/A
Nonpartisan hold		Swing	N/A	

General election 8 October 1774: Wallingford (2 seats)
Party	Candidate	Votes	%	±%
Nonpartisan	John Cator	Elected	N/A	N/A
Nonpartisan	Robert Barker	Elected	N/A	N/A
Nonpartisan	Thomas Wenman	Defeated	N/A	N/A
Nonpartisan	William Nedham	Defeated	N/A	N/A

General election 8 September 1780: Wallingford
Party	Candidate	Votes	%	±%
Nonpartisan	John Aubrey	Unopposed		
Nonpartisan	Chaloner Arcedeckne	Unopposed		

- Seat vacated on the appointment of Aubrey as a Lord of the Admiralty ^{2}

By-Election 15 July 1782: Wallingford
Party	Candidate	Votes	%	±%
Nonpartisan	John Aubrey	Unopposed		
Nonpartisan hold				

- Seat vacated on the appointment of Aubrey to an office

By-Election 30 December 1783: Wallingford
Party	Candidate	Votes	%	±%
Nonpartisan	John Aubrey	113	66.1	N/A
Nonpartisan	Thomas Keating	58	33.9	N/A
Majority		55	32.2	N/A
Turnout		171	N/A	N/A
Nonpartisan hold		Swing	N/A	

- Seat vacated on the appointment of Aubrey as a Commissioner of the Treasury ^{2}

By-Election January 1784: Wallingford
Party	Candidate	Votes	%	±%
Nonpartisan	Francis Sykes	Unopposed		
Nonpartisan hold				

- Note (1784 by-election): Namier and Brooke do not include this by-election, which is noted in Stooks Smith's book. Stooks Smith does not include the previous by-election won by Aubrey.

General election 31 March 1784: Wallingford (2 seats)
Party	Candidate	Votes	%	±%
Nonpartisan	Francis Sykes	Unopposed		
Nonpartisan	Thomas Aubrey	Unopposed		

=== Elections in the 1790s ===
General election 1790: Wallingford (2 seats)
Party	Candidate	Votes	%	±%
Nonpartisan	Francis Sykes	Unopposed		
Nonpartisan	Nathaniel Wraxall	Unopposed		

- Resignation of Wraxall

By-Election March 1794: Wallingford
Party	Candidate	Votes	%	±%
Tory	Francis Sykes	Unopposed		
Tory gain from Nonpartisan				

General election 1796: Wallingford (2 seats)
Party	Candidate	Votes	%	±%
Tory	Francis Sykes	Unopposed		
Whig	Sampson Eardley ^{1}	Unopposed		

=== Elections in the 1800s ===
General election 1802: Wallingford (2 seats)
Party	Candidate	Votes	%	±%
Tory	Francis Sykes	Unopposed		
Whig	William Hughes	Unopposed		

- Death of Sykes

By-Election February 1804: Wallingford
Party	Candidate	Votes	%	±%
Nonpartisan	George Galway Mills	Unopposed		
Nonpartisan gain from Tory				

General election 1806: Wallingford (2 seats)
Party	Candidate	Votes	%	±%
Whig	William Hughes	Unopposed		
Tory	Richard Benyon	Unopposed		

General election 1807: Wallingford (2 seats)
Party	Candidate	Votes	%	±%
Whig	William Hughes	Unopposed		
Tory	Richard Benyon	Unopposed		

=== Elections in the 1810s ===
General election 1812: Wallingford (2 seats)
Party	Candidate	Votes	%	±%
Whig	William Hughes	Unopposed		
Tory	Ebenezer Maitland	Unopposed		

General election 1818: Wallingford (2 seats)
Party	Candidate	Votes	%	±%
Whig	William Hughes	Elected	N/A	N/A
Tory	Ebenezer Maitland	Elected	N/A	N/A
Whig	George James Robarts	Defeated	N/A	N/A

=== Elections in the 1820s ===
General election 1820: Wallingford (2 seats)
Party	Candidate	Votes	%	±%
Whig	William Hughes	Elected	N/A	N/A
Whig	George James Robarts	Elected	N/A	N/A
Tory	Ebenezer Maitland	Defeated	N/A	N/A

General election 1826: Wallingford (2 seats)
Party	Candidate	Votes	%	±%
Whig	William Hughes	151	42.4	N/A
Whig	George James Robarts	125	35.1	N/A
Tory	John Dodson	80	22.5	N/A
Majority		45	12.6	N/A
Turnout		356	N/A	N/A
Whig hold		Swing		
Whig hold		Swing		

- Resignation of Robarts

By-Election December 1826: Wallingford
Party	Candidate	Votes	%	±%
Whig	Robert Knight	117	58.2	N/A
Tory	John Bailey (candidate)	84	41.8	N/A
Majority		33	16.4	N/A
Turnout		201	N/A	N/A
Whig hold		Swing	N/A	

=== Elections in the 1830s ===
General election 1830: Wallingford (2 seats)
Party	Candidate	Votes	%	±%
Whig	William Hughes	47	47.0	+4.6
Whig	Robert Knight	31	31.0	−4.1
Tory	John Bayley	22	22.0	−0.5
Majority		9	9.0	−3.6
Turnout		c. 50	c. 17.2	
Registered electors		c. 290		
Whig hold		Swing		
Whig hold		Swing		

General election 1831: Wallingford (2 seats)
Party	Candidate	Votes	%	±%
Whig	William Hughes	196	48.8	+1.8
Whig	Robert Knight	152	37.8	+6.8
Tory	William Seymour Blackstone	54	13.4	−8.6
Majority		98	24.4	+15.4
Turnout		c. 201	c. 69.3	c. +52.1
Registered electors		c. 290		
Whig hold		Swing	+3.1	
Whig hold		Swing	+5.6	

- Creation of Hughes as the 1st Baron Dinorben

By-election, 21 September 1831: Wallingford
Party	Candidate	Votes	%	±%
Whig	Thomas Charles Leigh	119	63.6	−23.0
Tory	William Seymour Blackstone	68	36.4	+23.0
Majority		51	27.2	+2.8
Turnout		187	c. 64.5	−4.8
Registered electors		c. 290		
Whig hold		Swing	−23.0	

General election 1832: Wallingford
Party	Candidate	Votes	%	±%
Tory	William Seymour Blackstone	202	55.0	+41.6
Whig	Charles Eyston	165	45.0	−41.6
Majority		37	10.0	N/A
Turnout		367	81.0	c. +11.7
Registered electors		453		
Tory gain from Whig		Swing	+41.6	

- Note (1832): Blackstone used crimson and white colours and Eyston used green.

General election 1835: Wallingford
Party	Candidate	Votes	%
Conservative	William Seymour Blackstone	Unopposed	
Registered electors		366	
Conservative hold			

- Note (1835): Stooks Smith gives the registered electors as 344.

General election 1837: Wallingford
Party	Candidate	Votes	%
Conservative	William Seymour Blackstone	159	57.4
Whig	Thomas Teed	118	42.6
Majority		41	14.8
Turnout		277	83.2
Registered electors		333	
Conservative hold			

- Note (1837): Stooks Smith gives the registered electorate as 322. Blackstone used crimson and white colours and Teed used light blue.

=== Elections in the 1840s ===
General election 1841: Wallingford
Party	Candidate	Votes	%	±%
Conservative	William Seymour Blackstone	Unopposed		
Registered electors		386		
Conservative hold				

General election 1847: Wallingford
Party	Candidate	Votes	%	±%
Conservative	William Seymour Blackstone	166	51.9	N/A
Whig	Alfred Morrison	154	48.1	New
Majority		12	3.8	N/A
Turnout		320	80.4	N/A
Registered electors		398		
Conservative hold		Swing	N/A	

=== Elections in the 1850s ===
General election 1852: Wallingford
Party	Candidate	Votes	%	±%
Conservative	Richard Malins	174	50.9	−1.0
Whig	Alfred Morrison	168	49.1	+1.0
Majority		6	1.8	−2.0
Turnout		342	79.9	−0.5
Registered electors		428		
Conservative hold		Swing	-1.0	

General election 1857: Wallingford
Party	Candidate	Votes	%	±%
Conservative	Richard Malins	149	52.5	+1.6
Whig	Alfred Sartoris	135	47.5	−1.6
Majority		14	5.0	+3.2
Turnout		284	76.5	−3.4
Registered electors		371		
Conservative hold		Swing	+1.6	

General election 1859: Wallingford
Party	Candidate	Votes	%	±%
Conservative	Richard Malins	Unopposed		
Registered electors		381		
Conservative hold				

=== Elections in the 1860s ===
General election 1865: Wallingford
Party	Candidate	Votes	%	±%
Liberal	Wentworth Dilke	158	54.5	New
Conservative	Richard Malins	132	45.5	N/A
Majority		26	9.0	N/A
Turnout		290	81.2	N/A
Registered electors		357		
Liberal gain from Conservative		Swing	N/A	

General election 1868: Wallingford
Party	Candidate	Votes	%	±%
Conservative	Stanley Vickers	453	55.9	+10.4
Liberal	Wentworth Dilke	358	44.1	−10.4
Majority		95	11.8	N/A
Turnout		811	86.1	+4.9
Registered electors		942		
Conservative gain from Liberal		Swing	+10.3	

=== Elections in the 1870s ===
- Death of Vickers

By-Election 9 March 1872: Wallingford
Party	Candidate	Votes	%	±%
Conservative	Edward Wells	Unopposed		
Conservative hold				

General election 1874: Wallingford
Party	Candidate	Votes	%	±%
Conservative	Edward Wells	575	56.8	N/A
Liberal	Edwin Jones	437	43.2	N/A
Majority		138	13.6	N/A
Turnout		1,012	88.7	N/A
Registered electors		1,141		
Conservative hold		Swing	N/A	

=== Elections in the 1880s ===
General election 1880: Wallingford
Party	Candidate	Votes	%	±%
Liberal	Walter Wren	582	51.8	+8.6
Conservative	Edward Wells	541	48.2	−8.6
Majority		41	3.6	N/A
Turnout		1,123	91.6	+2.9
Registered electors		1,226		
Liberal gain from Conservative		Swing	-8.7	

- Election declared void on petition

By-Election 1 July 1880: Wallingford
Party	Candidate	Votes	%	±%
Liberal	Pandeli Ralli	567	50.9	−0.9
Conservative	Robert William Hanbury	548	49.1	+0.9
Majority		19	1.8	−1.8
Turnout		1,115	91.0	−0.6
Registered electors		1,226		
Liberal hold		Swing	−0.9	

- Constituency abolished (1885)

Notes:-

- ^{1} A Peer of Ireland.
- ^{2} This is the office attributed to the MP by Stooks Smith. However Pigot in 1772 does not appear on the Wikipedia list of Masters of the Mint.

== Sources ==
1. British Parliamentary Election Results 1832–1885, compiled and edited by F.W.S. Craig (The Macmillan Press 1977)
2. J. K. Hedges, Wallingford History (London: Wm Clowes, 1881)
3. Sir Lewis Namier and John Brooke, The House of Commons 1754–1790, (London: HMSO, 1964)
4. Robert Henry O'Byrne The representative history of Great Britain and Ireland, comprising biographical and genealogical notices of the Members of Parliament from Edward VI 1547 to Victoria 1847. (London, John Ollivier, 1848)
5. T. H. B. Oldfield, The Representative History of Great Britain and Ireland (London: Baldwin, Cradock & Joy, 1816)
6. J Holladay Philbin, Parliamentary Representation 1832 – England and Wales (New Haven: Yale University Press, 1965)
7. Leigh Rayment's Historical List of MPs – Constituencies beginning with "W" (part 1)
8. M. Stenton (ed.), Who's Who of British Members of Parliament: Volume I 1832–1885 (The Harvester Press, 1976)
9. Stooks Smith, Henry (1973) [1844–1850]. Craig, F. W. S. (ed.). The Parliaments of England (2nd ed.). Chichester: Parliamentary Research Services. pp. 9–11. ISBN 0-900178-13-2.
10. Frederic A Youngs, "Guide to the Local Administrative Units of England, Vol I" (London: Royal Historical Society, 1979)
