= Robert Packer =

Robert Packer may refer to:

- Robert Packer (politician, died 1682) (1614–1682), member of parliament for Wallingford
- Robert Packer (politician, died 1731) (1678–1731), member of parliament for Berkshire
- R. C. Packer (Robert Clyde Packer, 1879–1934), journalist, media proprietor and founder of Australia's Packer media dynasty
- Robert Clyde Packer (1935–2001), his grandson, Australian politician
- Robert Asa Packer, founder of the Guthrie Robert Packer Hospital, Sayre, Pennsylvania
