= Charles Dilke (disambiguation) =

Sir Charles Dilke, 2nd Baronet (1843–1911) was a British Liberal and Radical politician and writer.

Charles Dilke may also refer to:

- Charles Wentworth Dilke (1789–1864), editor of the Athenaeum from 1830
- Wentworth Dilke (Sir Charles Wentworth Dilke, 1st Baronet, 1810–1869), son of the above, English art patron, horticulturalist and Whig politician
- Charles John Wentworth Dilke (1937–2022), British baronet and priest
