= William Seymour Blackstone =

English MP

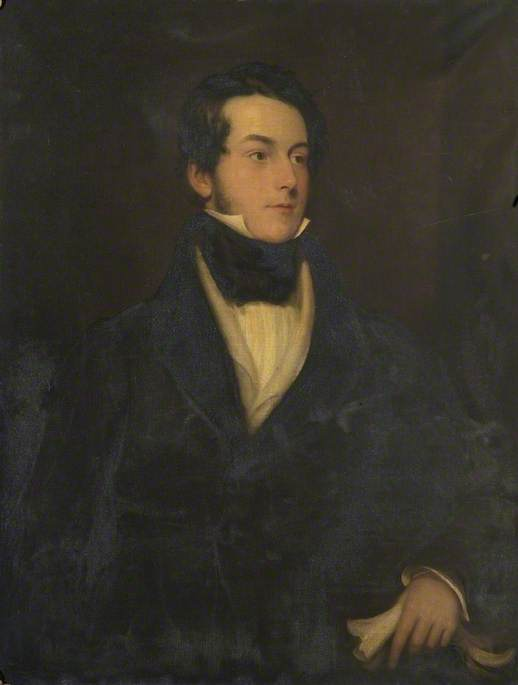
- 1845 portrait by Francis Grant

Member of Parliament for Wallingford
- In office 1832–1852
- Preceded by: Thomas Leigh; Robert Knight
- Succeeded by: Richard Malins

Personal details
- Born: 1809
- Died: 1881 (aged 71–72) Brighton
- Political party: Conservative
- Parent: James Blackstone (father)
- Relatives: William Blackstone (grandfather)

William Seymour Blackstone (1809–1881) was an English MP in the Parliament of the United Kingdom.

He was the son of James Blackstone, barrister-at-law of the Middle Temple, and grandson of the legal writer William Blackstone (1723–1780). Elected Conservative MP for Wallingford, Oxfordshire, England in 1832, he served until 1852, when the constituency refused to re-adopt him. He defended the Corn Laws, and was one of the rebels who opposed Robert Peel over Free Trade in 1846, causing the fall of the government. Like his grandfather, he was staunchly anti-Roman Catholic.

He lived at Castle Priory, Wallingford, built for his grandfather, but decided to build a still-grander house, Howbery Park, across the Thames in Crowmarsh Gifford. However, he fell into debt, largely because of the costs of building this new home, and spent time in the debtors' prison at Oxford. His debt problems also contributed to the end of his political career. He died in Brighton, never having lived at Howbery Park.

Parliament of the United Kingdom
Preceded by Robert Knight; Thomas Leigh	Member of Parliament for Wallingford; 1832–1852	Succeeded by Richard Malins
