= Wallingford by-election =

Wallingford by-election may refer to:

- 1872 Wallingford by-election
- 1880 Wallingford by-election
