= Battle of Morales =

1813 battle of the Peninsular War

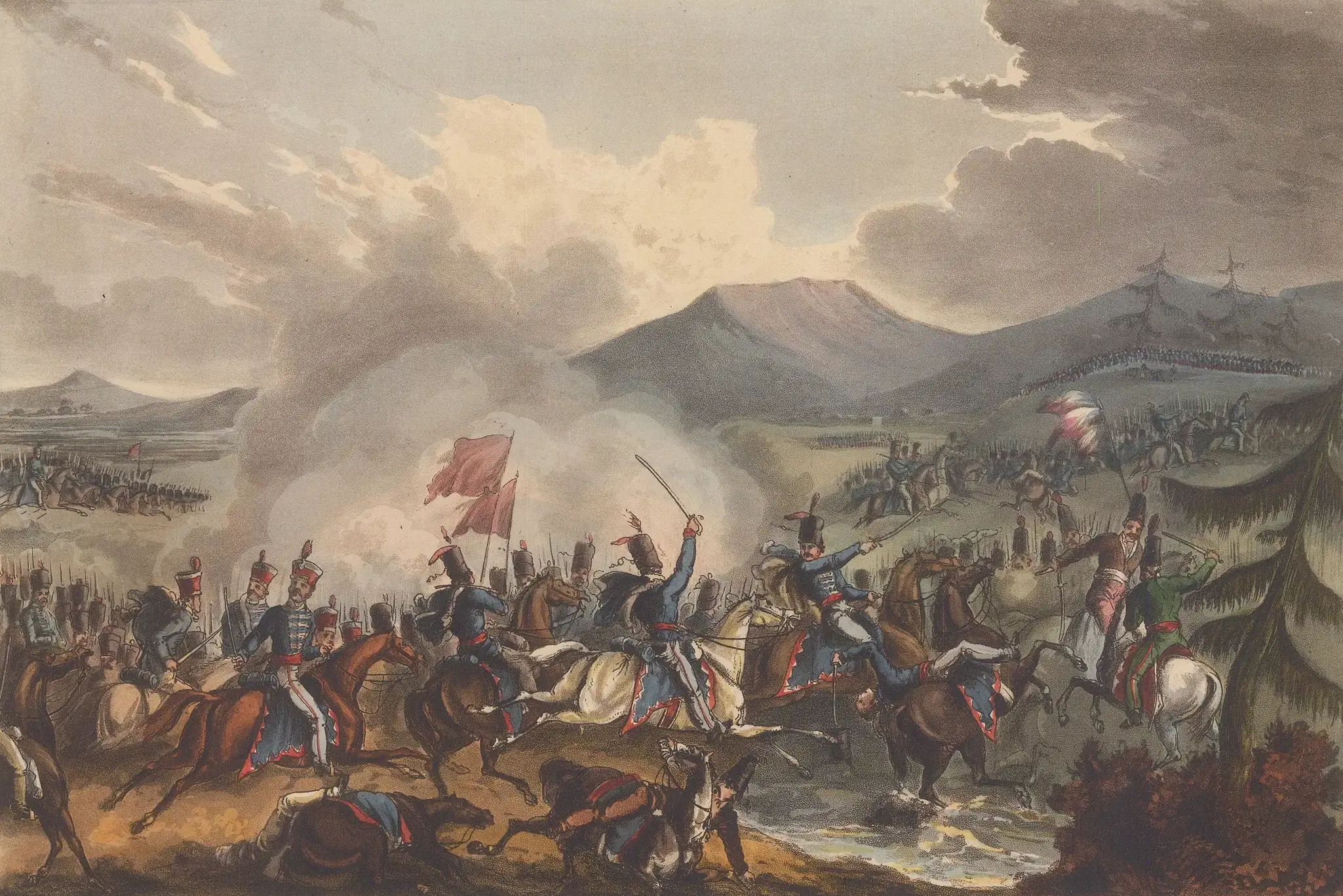
1815 engraving of the battle

The Battle of Morales was fought on 2 June 1813 during the Peninsular War. Fought near the village of Morales de Toro in Spain, the battle consisted of a cavalry skirmish between the British and French armies. Divisional-general Alexandre, vicomte Digeon commanded the French cavalry and Colonel Colquhoun Grant the British cavalry, although Major George Robarts was the one who gave the order to charge. Considered a victory for the British, the French cavalry then retreated upon their own retreating infantry and the British cavalry without infantry support were unable to continue the attack.
