= Robert Knight (MP, born 1768) =

English reforming radical and Member of Parliament

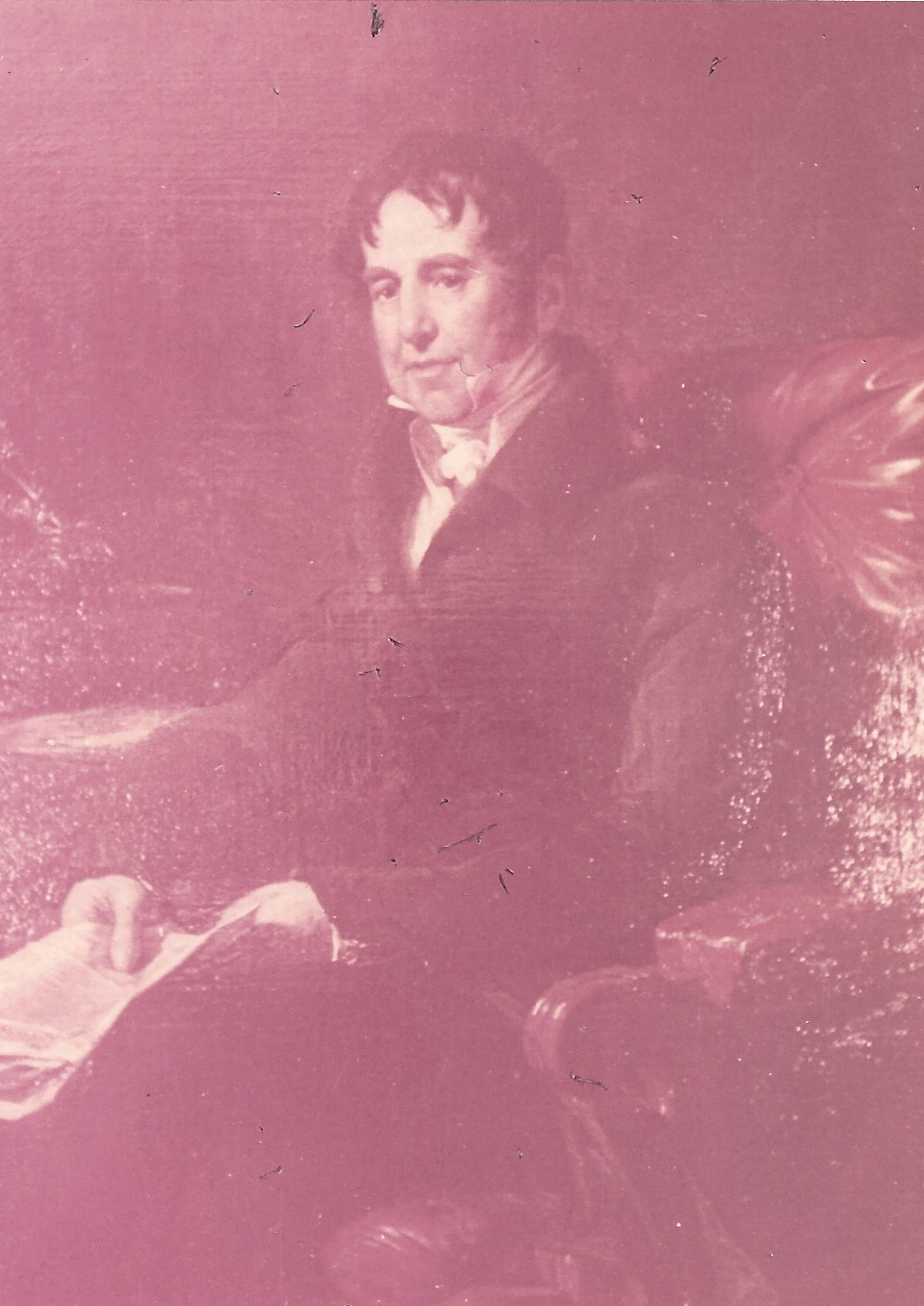
Robert Knight by John Partridge, 1828

Robert Knight (1768–1855) was an English reforming radical and Member of Parliament.

== Early life ==
He was one of the five children born to Jane Davies, the young mistress of Robert Knight, Earl of Catherlough. He was only four years old when his parents died and he inherited the family estate of some 6000 acres in Warwickshire and Montgomeryshire. He went up to Queens' College, Cambridge in 1785, travelled in France and Italy, and – when he came of age – commissioned Joseph Bonomi to remodel his father's home, Barrells Hall, near Ullenhall.

== Early career ==
In October 1791, when one of the two parliamentary seats for Warwick fell vacant, Knight stood as an independent against the nominee of Lord Warwick. He was no match for the power of the Greville family interest and lost by 231 to 160 votes, but his interest in radical politics was kindled He encountered Dr Samuel Parr during the Warwick election and it may have been through him that he met John Horne Tooke and Sir Francis Burdett, both of whom would be close and lifelong friends. Throughout the 1790s, he was a regular dinner companion of William Godwin, John Thelwall and Granville Sharp. In April 1792 Knight was one of the founder members of The Society of the Friends of the People which was initially concerned with reforming corrupt practices such as Knight had experienced in Warwick. After the armistice agreed between France and Austria in May 1800, Knight, with his friend, Henry Berkeley Portman, and their families, were able to visit France, despite the United Kingdom still being at war. Knight remained pro-French in his sympathies and was later heard to promise that he would migrate to America if Napoleon was defeated at Waterloo

== Radical politics, 1801-1832 ==
Knight's politics in the 1800s were close to those of Sir Francis Burdett. He was closely involved with Burdett's two attempts to be elected M.P. for Middlesex in 1802 and 1804. In 1804 he was responsible for organizing the cavalcade that started out from the Coutts family mansion at 78 Piccadilly. In the General Election of November 1806 he was himself returned to parliament in the St. John family interest as Member for Wootton Bassett. However, at the General Election only six months later, he lost the seat to a local Tory candidate. In January 1809, he was deeply embarrassed by being called as first witness in the investigation into the conduct of the Duke of York as Commander-in-Chief. He was forced to admit that in 1805 he had approached Mrs Mary Anne Clarke to arrange for his brother's transfer on half-pay. Burdett, though a leader in the prosecution, stayed away from parliament on this occasion. At a by-election in 1811, Knight regained the Wootton Bassett seat, but lost it again at the General Election of October 1812. He was then out of parliament until returned for Rye at a by-election in 1823, and then sat for Wallingford until he retired from parliament in 1832.

== The grand old man ==
By now Knight had become an elder statesman of radical politics in Warwickshire. In April 1831 he addressed the great Reform meeting on Warwick Racecourse, bringing with him the good wishes of Sir Francis Burdett. He was at a similar meeting in May 1832 organized by the Birmingham Political Union. Because of his family troubles (see below) he declined to have his name put forward as one of those to be ennobled in the event of the Bill's rejection in the Lords. In January 1836 he was at another Reform dinner in Birmingham organized by the B.P.U., and in September was one of those who set up the first Liberal Association for Warwickshire (Southern Division). At a testimonial dinner in November 1837, at which Knight's attempt to gain the Warwick seat in 1792 was remembered, his son-in-law declared that "no man is more anxious for the independence and the prosperity of the liberal interest in Warwick"

== Private life and legacy ==
In 1791, Knight married Frances, youngest daughter of Charles, 8th Lord Dormer, of Grove Park, by whom he had a son (who died young) and two daughters, Frances (d.s.p.) and Georgiana. In early 1802 he and his wife agreed to a separation. Mrs Knight was to have custody of the children, £2000 and £800 a year, on condition that she gave up her association with Colonel Joseph Fuller, whose brother was married to Knight's sister. This she did not do and Knight thereupon removed the children from her care and halved her allowance. Evelyn Dormer, Mrs Knight's brother, challenged Knight to a duel, and was duly imprisoned in the Marshalsea for three months. In 1805, Knight brought a case of criminal conversation with his wife against Col. Fuller. He was awarded damages of £7,000. In 1813, Mrs Knight gave birth to a son, of an unknown father. She gave notice that, on her husband's death, she would claim the Knight property for her son. Knight collected testimonies to prove that the child was not his but, as the law then stood, any child born to a wife was deemed to be her husband's, unless he was overseas at the time of conception. On Mrs Knight's death in 1842, an agreement was reached between her son and the next heir to the entail to sell the land and divide the proceeds. In the early 1820s, Knight had left Barrells Hall to go to ruin, and settled at Chadshunt, near Gaydon, Warwickshire.

The contents of Barrells Hall were regarded by Knight as his personal property and descended in the family of his only grandson, Maj. Edward Raleigh King, of Chadshunt, son of his daughter, Georgiana, who married Col. Edward Bolton King. The correspondence of Lord Catherlough's first wife, Henrietta St John, Lady Luxborough was given by a member of the family to the British Museum. It is particularly useful for the knowledge it gives of the life in England of her half brother, Henry St John, 1st Viscount Bolingbroke. In 1946, several portraits of the Knight and St John families were left by Miss Ethel Raleigh King to the De Morgan Foundation at Old Battersea House, and now hang at Lydiard Park, Lydiard Tregoze, Wiltshire.

Parliament of the United Kingdom
Preceded by Peter William Baker; Robert Williams	Member of Parliament for Wootton Bassett; 1806 – 1807; With: Robert Williams	Succeeded by John Cheesment; John Murray
Preceded by John Murray; Benjamin Walsh	Member of Parliament for Wootton Bassett; 1811 – 1812; With: Benjamin Walsh; John Attersoll	Succeeded by John Attersoll; James Kibblewhite
Preceded by John Dodson; Peter Browne	Member of Parliament for Rye; 1823 – 1826; With: Henry Bonham	Succeeded by Henry Bonham; Richard Arkwright
Preceded by George James Robarts; William Hughes	Member of Parliament for Wallingford; 1826 – 1832; With: William Hughes to 1831; Thomas Leigh 1831–32	Succeeded by William Seymour Blackstone
