= Edmund Ashfield (MP) =

16th-century English politician

Sir Edmund Ashfield (by 1506 – 24 January 1578) of Ewelme, Oxfordshire, was an English politician.

He was the son of John Ashfield of Heythrop, Oxfordshire and was knighted in 1570. He served as a justice of the peace for Buckinghamshire and Oxfordshire from 1547, was surveyor of crown lands for Bucks. in 1559 and appointed High Sheriff of Berkshire and Oxfordshire for 1559–60 and High Sheriff of Bedfordshire and Buckinghamshire for 1569–70. He was elected a Member of the Parliament of England for Wallingford in April 1554 and November 1554, and for Oxfordshire in 1559.

== Personal life ==
He married Eleanor, the daughter of Humphrey Barton of Northamptonshire and the widow of William Stafford of Tattenhoe, Buckinghamshire. They had a son Francis (who predeceased his father) and 3 daughters (2 of whom predeceased him). His estate was inherited by his surviving daughter Amicia (or Avis), who had married Edmund Lee.

Political offices
Preceded by Richard Fiennes	High Sheriff of Berkshire and Oxfordshire; 1559–1560	Succeeded by Edward Fabian
Preceded by Sir William Dormer	High Sheriff of Bedfordshire and Buckinghamshire; 1569–1570	Succeeded by Sir Lewis Mordaunt
