= Robert Packer (politician, died 1682) =

English politician

Robert Packer (12 September 1614 – 25 February 1682) of Shellingford, Berkshire was an English politician who sat in the House of Commons in two periods between 1646 and 1679, as well as being Usher of the Exchequer.

Packer was the eldest son of the Clerk of the Privy Seal, John Packer of Shellingford Manor in Berkshire (now Oxfordshire) and his wife, Philippa, the daughter of Francis Mills of Bitterne in Hampshire. He was educated at University College, Oxford and succeeded his father in 1649.

In 1646, he was elected Member of Parliament for Wallingford in the Long Parliament. He was excluded in 1648 under Pride's Purge. In 1660, Packer was elected again as MP for Wallingford in the Convention Parliament. He was re-elected in 1661 for the Cavalier Parliament and sat until 1679.

Packer married Temperance Stephens daughter of Col. Edward Stephens of Little Sodbury in Gloucestershire, by whom he had at least four children. He inherited Shellingford from his father in 1649 and died on 25 February 1682, at the age of 67, being buried in Shellingford Church.

Parliament of England
Preceded by Edmund Dunch; Thomas Howard	Member of Parliament for Wallingford; 1645–1648; With: Edmund Dunch	Succeeded by Edmund Dunch
Preceded by Edmund Dunch	Member of Parliament for Wallingford; 1661; With: Hungerford Dunch 1660; Thomas Saunders 1660; Hon. George Fane 1661–1663; Sir John Bennet 1663–1679	Succeeded by John Stone; Scorey Barker
