= Robert Oxenford =

English politician

Robert Oxenford (fl. 1378–1401) was an English politician and shoemaker. He sat as MP for Wallingford in 1378, October 1382, 1385, 1386, and January 1397.

He also served as bailiff of Wallingford from Michaelmas 1397 till 1398.

He was frequently amerced for selling shoes at excessive prices.
