= John Coterell =

Member of the Parliament of England

John Coterell (fl. 1390–1421) of Wallingford, Berkshire, was an English Member of Parliament for Wallingford in January 1390, 1393, 1394, 1395, Jan. 1397, Sept. 1397, 1410, 1420 and May 1421.
