= George Fane =

English politician

Colonel The Hon. George Fane JP DL MP (c. 1616 – April 1663) was an English politician who sat in the House of Commons at various times between 1640 and 1663. He was Lord of the Manor of Hunningham. He fought in the Royalist army in the English Civil War.

== Early life ==
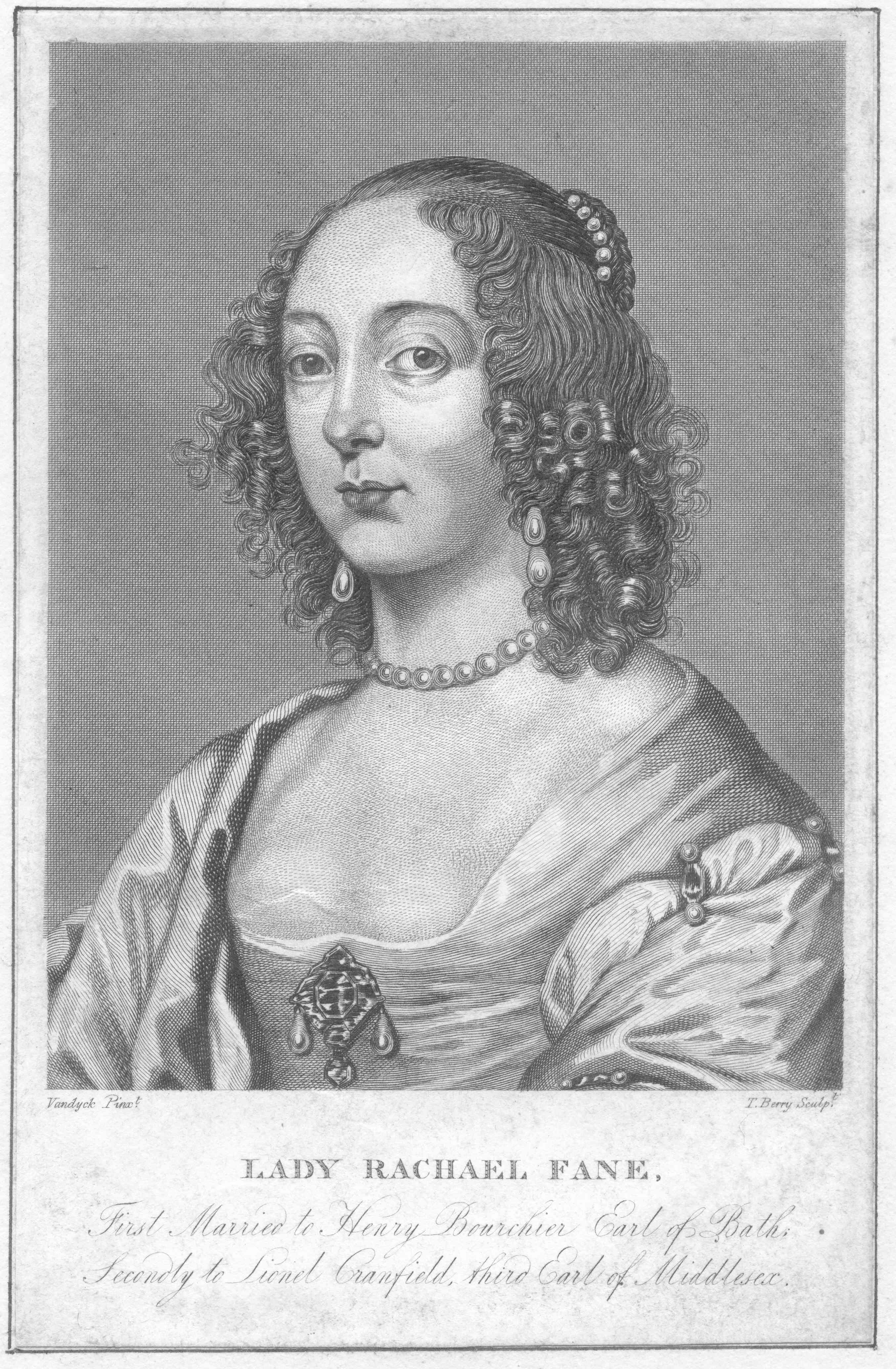
Fane's closest sister, Rachael Fane.

Colonel the Hon. George Fane was the fifth but fourth surviving son of Francis Fane, 1st Earl of Westmorland and Mary Mildmay (d. 1640), daughter and heiress of Sir Anthony Mildmay of Apethorpe, Northamptonshire.

He was educated at Eton College from 1627 to 1632 and matriculated from Emmanuel College, Cambridge in 1632. He travelled abroad from 1635 to 1638, visiting Italy.

== Career ==
In 1640, Fane was elected Member of Parliament (MP) for Callington in Cornwall, a seat controlled by the Rolle family of Heanton Satchville, Petrockstowe. By 1642, he was a Captain of an Irish foot regiment and was Royalist lieutenant colonel by 1643. He was colonel of a foot regiment from 1644 to 1649 and fought as a colonel at Marston Moor.

Fane acquired the mortgage, in trust for his son, of a Thameside Berkshire estate at Basildon House in 1656 in the names of his sister, Rachael Fane (styled Lady Bath) (who may have supplied the money) and his nephew, Charles Fane, Lord le Despenser (later the third Earl of Westmorland and 10th Baron le Despencer). Following the Restoration he was a Justice of the Peace and a Deputy Lieutenant for Berkshire until his death. He was a Commissioner for assessment for Warwickshire from August 1660 to 1661 and one for Berkshire from 1661 to 1663.

In 1661 Fane was elected MP for Wallingford in the Cavalier Parliament. He was one of the most active Members in the opening sessions of the parliament, serving on 84 committees.

Fane died in the parish of St Andrew's, Hatton Garden and was buried in St Bartholomew-the-Great, Smithfield on 25 April 1663, a church which had close links to his mother's family.

== Personal life ==
By 1650, Fane was married to Dorothy Horsey (1630–1679), daughter and heir of James Horsey (d. 1630) of Honington, Warwickshire. That property was sold in 1690 and 1695). Together, they were the parents of:

- Sir Henry Fane (1650–1706), who married Elizabeth Southcott, daughter of the late Thomas Southcott of Exeter.

Fane died in April 1663. Following his death, his widow remarried to Edward Wray, a son of Sir Christopher Wray.

Parliament of England
Preceded by Sir Samuel Rolle; Thomas Gardiner	Member of Parliament for Callington; 1640–1643; With: Sir Arthur Ingram 1640–1643	Succeeded by Lord Clinton; Thomas Dacres
Preceded by Robert Packer; Thomas Saunders	Member of Parliament for Wallingford; 1661–1663; With: Robert Packer	Succeeded by Sir John Bennet; Robert Packer
