= Edward Wells (MP) =

Member of Parliament for Wallingford
- In office March 1872 – 1880
- Preceded by: Stanley Vickers
- Succeeded by: Walter Wren

Personal details
- Born: 1821
- Died: February 9, 1910
- Party: Conservative Party
- Occupation: Businessman; banker; brewer; politician

Edward Wells (1821 – 9 February 1910) was an English businessman and Conservative Party politician from Wallingford, which was then in Berkshire. He sat in the House of Commons of the United Kingdom from 1872 to 1880.

== Early life and family ==
He was the son of Edward Wells from Wallingford, where his family had lived since the early 18th century. He became a banker and brewer, and an alderman of the town. His brother Thomas Frederick Wells (1837–1907) was also an alderman of the town, and served 4 times as its mayor. The tall chimneys of their family business, the Wallingford Brewery, dominated the town's skyline.

He married a niece of Sir Matthew Wood, a former Lord Mayor of London.

== Political career ==
Wells was elected at a by-election in March 1872 as the Member of Parliament (MP) for Wallingford, filling the vacancy caused the death of the Conservative MP Stanley Vickers. The election took place in public, and the returning officer reminded voters that with a secret ballot about to be introduced, this was likely to be their last public election. A Mr Moffat had been canvassing, with the intention of contesting the seat for the Liberal Party, but had withdrawn and left the town. Wells was therefore the only candidate, so he was returned without a vote. In his acceptance speech he opposed secular education, supported a reduction in income tax, and denounced the Ballot Bill as "positively un-English".

He was re-elected in 1874, but at the general election in 1880 he was defeated by the Liberal candidate Walter Wren, by a margin of 581 votes to 542.

Wells lodged a petition, alleging bribery and treating by his opponent and his agents. The petition was upheld, and the election was declared void. A by-election was held in July 1880, where Wells did not stand. The seat was won by another Liberal candidate, Pandeli Ralli. That result was also the subject of a petition (though not by Wells), when it was found that voters had been bribed. However, it was not proven that the bribery had been done by an agent of Mr Ralli, so the election result was upheld.

In 1909, Wells was re-elected as a churchwarden of St Mary's Church in Wallingford, for his 67th year in the post. This was claimed to be a record for the United Kingdom.

Parliament of the United Kingdom
Preceded by Stanley Vickers	Member of Parliament for Wallingford; 1872 – 1880	Succeeded by Walter Wren
