= HR Wallingford =

British hydrology research organisation

HR Wallingford Ltd
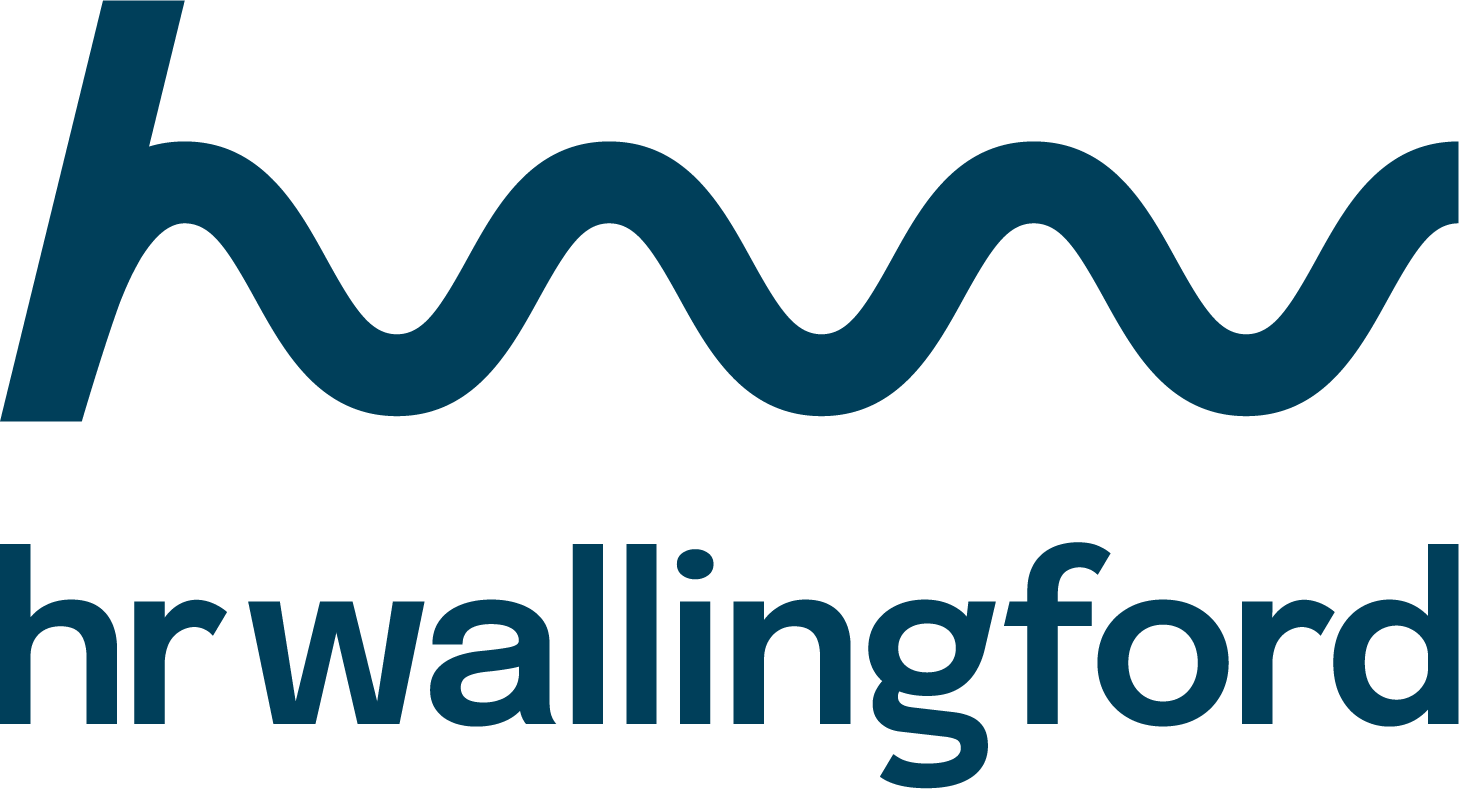

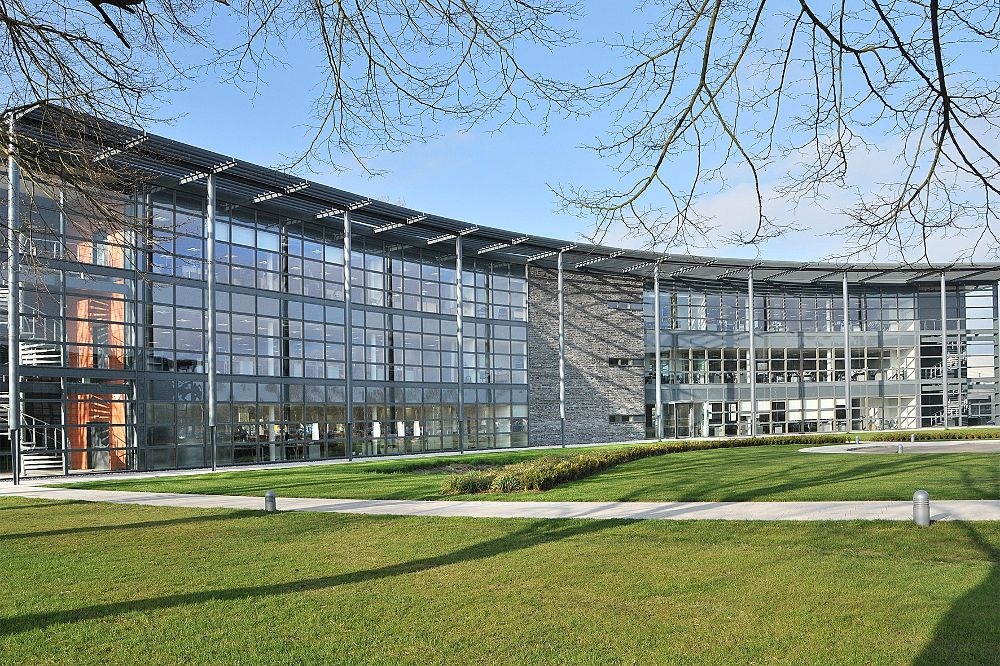
- Headquarters at the Howbery Park in Oxfordshire
- Formerly: Hydraulics Research Limited, Hydraulics Research Station
- Founded: 1947; 79 years ago
- Headquarters: Oxfordshire, United Kingdom
- Services: Engineering, Research, Physical Modelling, Numerical Modelling, Simulation
- Website: hrwallingford.com

HR Wallingford Ltd is an engineering and research organisation based in the United Kingdom with a focus on civil engineering and environmental hydraulics.

It was created by the UK Department of Scientific and Industrial Research in 1947, to deal with 'looser boundary' problems such as coastal erosion, flood protection, and the silting and scouring of rivers, estuaries and harbours.

HR Wallingford was a government establishment until 1982, when it was privatised from the Department of the Environment to become Hydraulics Research Station Limited. It became known as HR Wallingford in 1991. During its existence, it has contributed to advance hydraulics research. It also worked on water-related projects in the UK and around the world.

== History ==
1945 – The Institution of Civil Engineers submitted a proposal to the Department of Scientific and Industrial Research on the need for a hydraulics research station in the UK.

1947 – DSIR Hydraulic Research Organisation formed in London

1951 – Hydraulics Research Station established in Wallingford

1965 – Re-organisation into Ministry of Technology. Hydrological Research Unit transferred to the Natural Environment Research Council and later to become Institute of Hydrology and then Centre for Ecology and Hydrology

1971 – Transfer to the Department of the Environment

1982 – Privatisation to create Hydraulics Research Station Limited - a company limited by guarantee.

1983 – Hydraulics Research Limited

1991 – HR Wallingford Limited

== Projects in the UK ==
=== Thames Estuary ===
HRS started doing research in the tidal Thames Estuary in 1947. At this time HRO (Hydraulic Research Organisation) was based at the National Physical Laboratory at Teddington and had links with a large physical model set up by the Port of London Authority (PLA) in one of their disused warehouses on the Surrey Docks. This model was used to examine many hydrodynamic, sediment, water quality and morphological issues related to the Thames Estuary and the potential redevelopment of the Estuary following the considerable infrastructure damage that had been suffered during World War II. Many of the issues examined and the techniques developed in this pre-computer age formed a remarkably good base from which the modern range and scope of studies have been developed. This has determined the framework for an understanding of the many processes that operate within the tidal Thames Estuary.

=== Thames Barrier ===
In 1968 of hydraulic studies were funded to understand how a barrier across the Thames would affect the levels of the river and change the movement of silt, although at that time no particular site had been chosen. This would lead to the creation of stations to monitor the measure and the studies were not complete until 1981. The Thames barrier was designed by Rendel, Palmer and Tritton for the Greater London Council and tested at Hydraulics Research Station.

=== Shipmoor ===
In 2021, with the Witherby Publishing Group, the company launched an LNG carrier mooring tool called SHIPMOOR.

== HRS and Institute of Hydrology ==
HRS established the Hydrological Research Unit for the purpose of River catchment research and engineering and co-operation with other government offices such as the : - Soil Survey of England and Wales (JP Bell) - the Ministry of Agriculture Fisheries and Food, - the River Authority (1963 Act).

The work expanded greatly after the 1968 flood in Somerset from such actions as the Plynlimon Hafren and Gwy forest and grassland catchments of 1965 under the auspices of James McCulloch (civil engineering) and John C Rodda (hydrometerology and catchments), to operate several units Northumberland, Thetford, Plynlimon, and was moved to Crowmarsh Gifford as the Institute of Hydrology, in part concerning itself with a mass Flood analysis using existing River Authority data (1975). The Institute is now the Centre for Ecology and Hydrology, part of the Natural Environment Research Council.
