= Charles John Wentworth Dilke =

British Roman Catholic priest (1937–2022)

The Rev. Fr. Sir Charles Dilke, 6th Baronet, Cong. Orat. (21 February 1937 – 14 November 2022) was a British baronet and priest of the London Oratory.

== Life ==
Charles John Wentworth Dilke was born in London in 1937, to Sir John Dilke, 5th Bt. and Sheila Seeds, daughter of the future ambassador to the Soviet Union Sir William Seeds.

Dilke studied at Ashdown House followed by Winchester College and King’s College, Cambridge for a degree in architecture. It was at Cambridge that Dilke, previously having shown few signs of religiosity, began to attend chapel services and fell under the influence of the then Roman Catholic chaplain Monsignor Alfred Gilbey, leading to his conversion.

== London Oratory ==
On the advice of Gilbey, Dilke entered the London Oratory shortly after graduating from Cambridge, where he would spend the next 56 years as a priest and serve from 1981 to 1987 as a provost. He was ordained in 1966, after studying at Rome's Beda College during the Second Vatican Council.

Dilke retained some of his family's ancestral non-traditionalism – his election as provost was said to be celebrated by the liberal-minded members of his community – and was not in sympathy with the fogeyish element that congregated about the Brompton Oratory. Indeed, upon hearing the news from Rome of the white smoke signaling a new pontiff, he once remarked "Popes come. Then they die, and another one is elected", before continuing to play his recorder.

From 2004, Dilke was a fellow of the Royal Astronomical Society, and even wrote an unpublished novel about the oratory set in outer space.

== Oratory School ==
In the 1980s Dilke was instrumental to the survival of the London Oratory School, when the Westminster Archdiocese proposed discontinuing the school’s sixth form to be absorbed into a consolidated college with others across the city. As chairman of the board of governors, Father Charles lent steadfast support to the "visionary educationalist" headmaster John McIntosh, who thought him "the most supportive chairman of governors in his 30 years as head." Dilke protested to Basil Cardinal Hume, Archbishop of Westminster, a Benedictine monk of Ampleforth Abbey, that he would no more accept the closure than would Hume of his own college, and pointing out the diocese did not have jurisdiction over the oratory (a verdict confirmed after a diocesan appeal to Rome).

== Death ==
In 2022, Dilke broke a hip after tripping on a Turkish rug during an All Souls' Day celebration. He died shortly thereafter.

== Family ==
Dilke acceded to the Dilke Baronetcy on the death of his father in 1998, inheriting a title first granted by personal act of Queen Victoria to his great great grandfather Charles Wentworth Dilke, an organizer of the Great Exhibition of 1851.

Even in Dilke's youth the family retained a connection to its most infamous forbear. Virginia Crawford, the MP's wife whose testimony in a divorce case precipitated the second baronet's public disgrace in 1886, became a Catholic under the influence of Henry Edward Cardinal Manning as well as a friend of the family who as "Auntie Nia" dandled the younger Dilke on her knee as a baby.

On his death the baronetcy was inherited by his brother Timothy, a retired rheumatologist.
