= Oswald A. W. Dilke =

British classical philologist (1915–1993)

Oswald Ashton Wentworth Dilke (26 April 1915 – 10 July 1993) was an English classicist and philologist who was Professor of Latin Language and Literature at the University of Leeds.

== Early life ==
Dilke was born at Hove, Sussex, the son of Clement Wentworth Dilke, younger brother of Sir Fisher Wentworth Dilke, 4th Baronet. He studied Classics at Stowe School and King's College, Cambridge from which he held an MA.

== Academic career ==
Dilke was appointed a Lecturer at University College, Hull (which later became the University of Hull) in 1946. From 1950 to 1967 he was a Lecturer (from 1963 Senior Lecturer) at the University of Glasgow. During the years 1961-2, Dilke held the Chair of Classics at Rhodes University, Grahamstown, South Africa. In 1967 he became Professor of Latin Language and Literature at the University of Leeds, a post he held until he retired with the title Emeritus Professor in 1980.

Dilke helped establish the Varronian Institute in Rieti. He is known for his scholarship of Latin language and text, studies of Greek theatres, and, in particular, his work on ancient cartography and land surveying. Among his best known books are The Roman land surveyors (1971) and Greek and Roman maps (1985).

== Publications ==
=== Books ===
- 1961. Lucan, poet of freedom. Inaugural lecture delivered at Rhodes University by O.A.W. Dilke.Grahamstown, Rhodes University.
- 1971. The Roman Land Surveyors. An introduction to the Agrimensores. Newton Abbot: David and Charles.
- 1975. The ancient Romans : how they lived and worked. Newton Abbot: David and Charles.
- 1977. Roman Books and their Impact. Leeds: The Elmete Press.
- 1980. Surveying the Roman way. Leeds University Press.
- 1985. Greek and Roman Maps. Ithaca NY: Cornell University Press.
- 1987. Mathematics and measurement. Berkeley: University of California Press; London: British Museum. ISBN 9780520060722.
  - Reading the past, v. 2: Mathematics and measurement in libraries (WorldCat catalog).

=== Articles & Chapters ===
- 1948. "The Greek Theatre Cavea." The Annual of the British School at Athens 43:125-192.
- 1967. "Illustrations from Roman surveyors’ manuals." Imago Mundi 21.1:9-30.
- 1974. "Archaeological and epigraphic evidence of Roman land surveys," in H. Temporini (ed.) Aufstieg und Niedergang der römischen Welt (2 Principat 1): 564-592. Berlin & New York: W. de Gruyter.
- 1992. "Insights in the Corpus Agrimensorum into surveying methods and mapping," in O. Behrends & L. Capogrossi Colognesi (ed.) Die römische Feldmeßkunst. Interdisciplinäre Beiträge zu ihrer Bedeutung für die Zivilisationsgeschichte Roms (Abhandlungen der Akademie der Wissenschaften in Göttingen, Philologisch-historische Klasse 3,193): 337-347. Göttingen: Vandenhoeck & Ruprecht.

== See also ==
- Dilke baronets
