= Ebenezer Maitland =

English landowner and politician

Ebenezer Maitland FRS
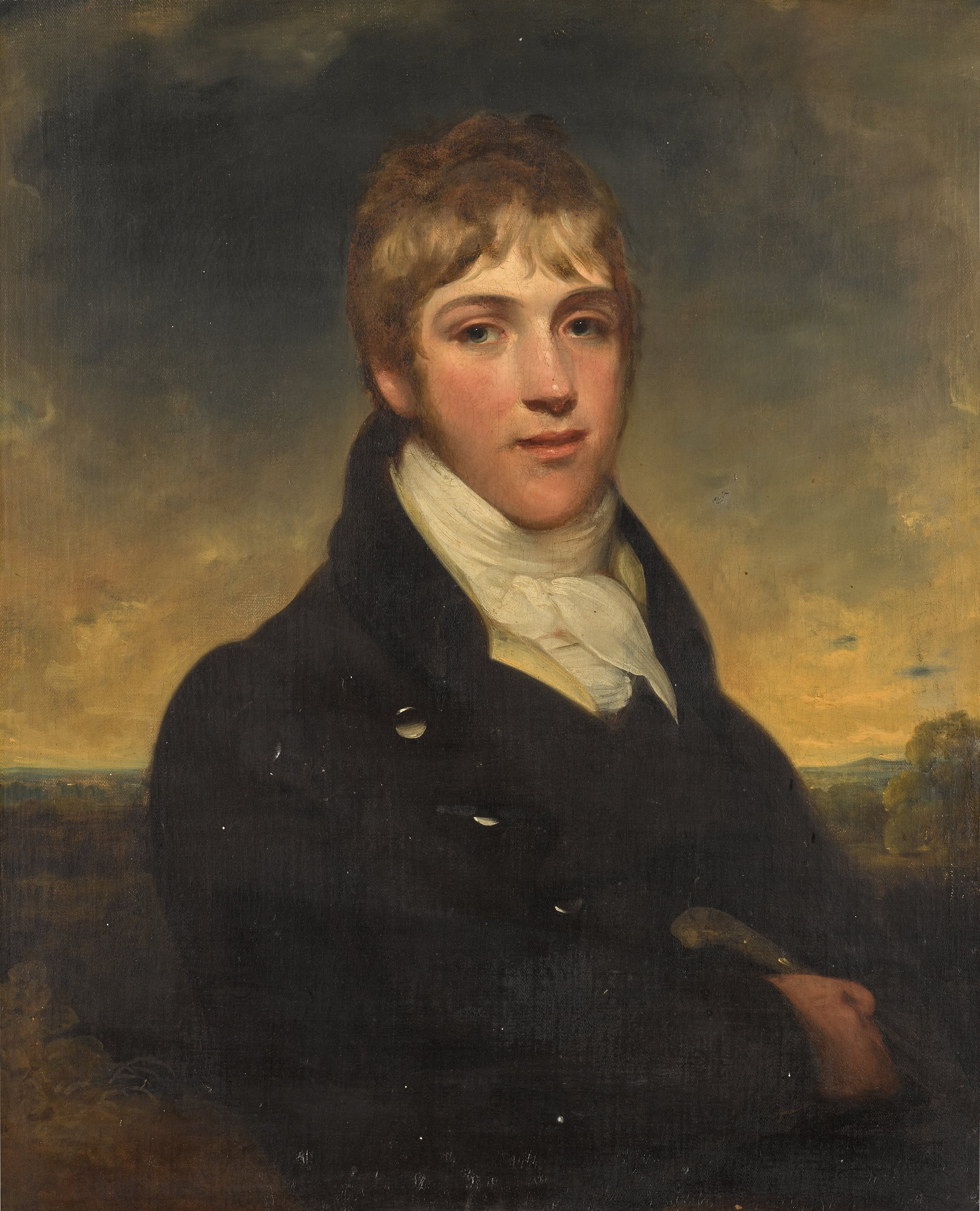

Member of the British Parliament for Lostwithiel
- In office 1807–1812

Member of the British Parliament for Wallingford
- In office 1812–1820

Member of the British Parliament for Chippenham
- In office 1826–1830

Personal details
- Born: 23 April 1780
- Died: 1 November 1858 (aged 78) Brighton, Sussex, UK
- Spouse: Bethia Ellis
- Children: 12, including William Fuller Maitland
- Parent(s): Ebenezer Maitland, Mary Winter

Military service
- Rank: lieutenant-colonel
- Unit: Reading Volunteers

Ebenezer Fuller Maitland FRS (23 April 1780 – 1 November 1858) was an English landowner and politician.

== Early life ==
Maitland was the only son of Ebenezer Maitland, a London businessman and Bank of England director, and his wife Mary, daughter of John Winter. In 1807 he changed his name to Ebenezer Fuller Maitland in accordance with the bequest of his wife's unmarried aunt, Sarah Fuller, who left him her fortune in 1810.

== Career ==
In 1804 Maitland served as a lieutenant-colonel in the Reading Volunteers. He was elected Member of Parliament for Lostwithiel in 1807, for Wallingford in 1812 and for Chippenham in 1826, holding the latter seat until 1830 when he unsuccessfully sought election at Abingdon. He was appointed Sheriff of Berkshire for 1825–26 and Sheriff of Breconshire for 1831–32.

Fuller Maitland was a director of the South Sea Company from 1815 until his death and in 1829 was elected a Fellow of the Royal Society. As well as two large London houses, he owned country estates at Shinfield Park and Park Place in Berkshire, Stansted Hall at Stansted Mountfichet in Essex, Garth near Builth Wells in Breconshire, and High Barcaple in Kirkcudbrightshire.

He died at Brighton in Sussex.

== Family ==
In 1800, aged 20, Maitland married Bethia, the only child and heiress of Joshua Ellis and his wife Esther, the only child to marry of the banker William Fuller, said to be one of the richest men in England. They had twelve children, of whom four sons and four daughters married. His eldest surviving son and heir was the art collector William Fuller Maitland, who was father of the MP and cricketer William Fuller-Maitland.

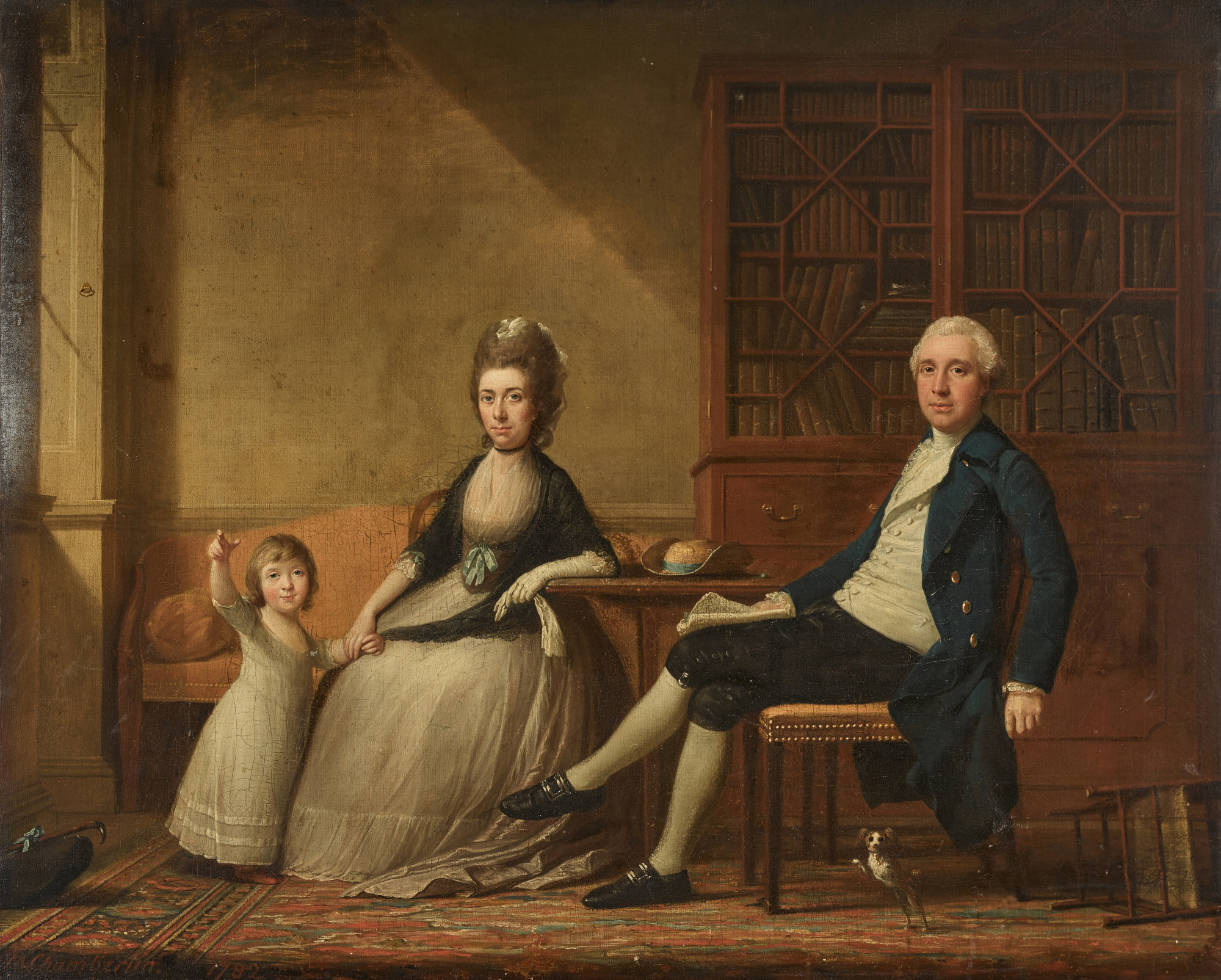
Group portrait of Ebenezer Maitland Senior (1752–1834) and his wife Mary Winter (c. 1752–1835) with their son Ebenezer Fuller Maitland (1780–1858)

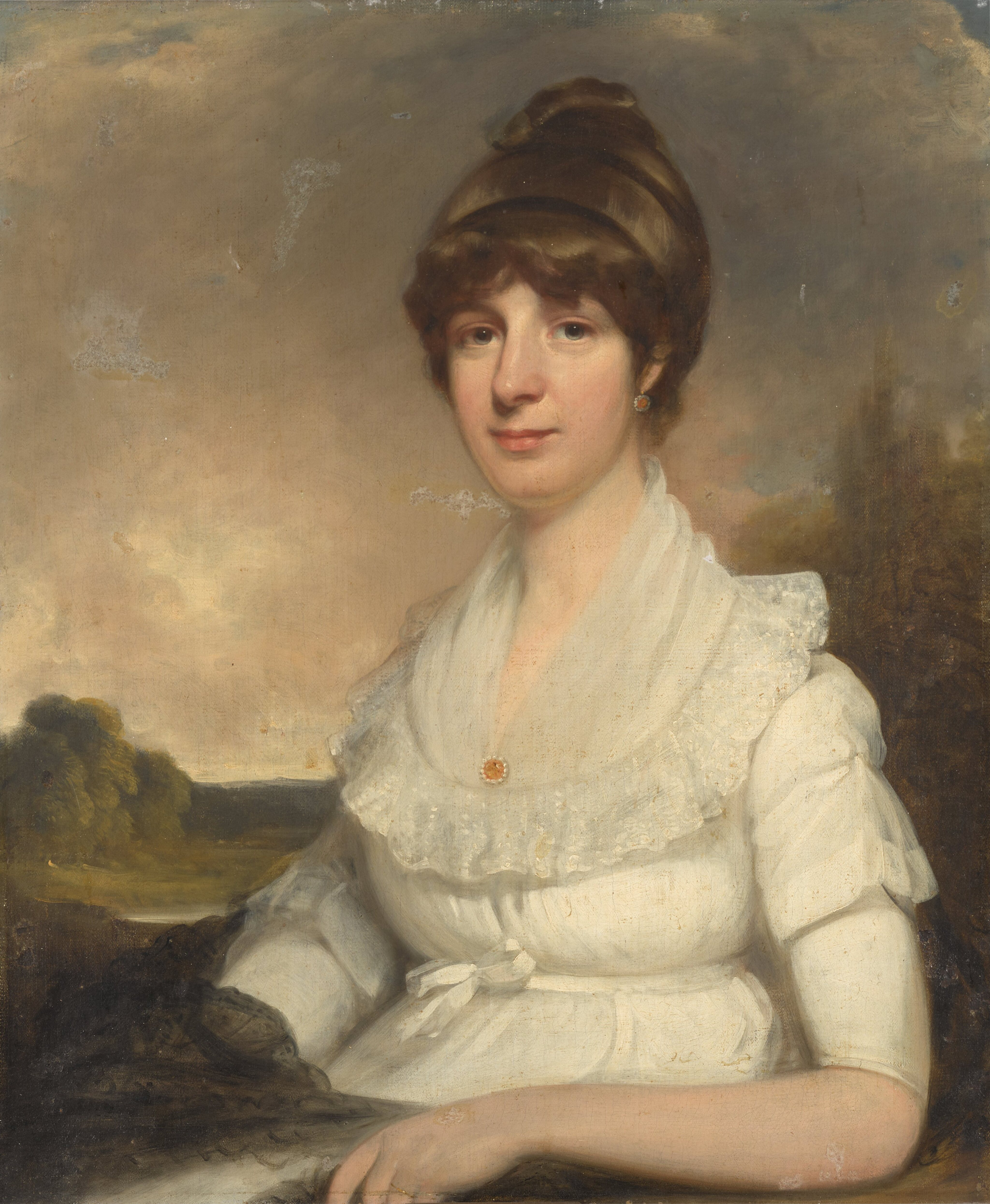
A portrait of Bertha Ellis Fuller Maitland (1781-1865)

Parliament of the United Kingdom
Preceded by The Viscount Lismore; Charles Cockerell	Member of Parliament for Lostwithiel; 1807–1812; With: George Peter Holford	Succeeded by Reginald Pole Carew; John Ashley Warre
Preceded by William Hughes; Richard Benyon	Member of Parliament for Wallingford; 1812–1820; With: William Hughes	Succeeded by William Hughes; George James Robarts
Preceded by William Madocks; John Rock Grossett	Member of Parliament for Chippenham; 1826–1830; With: Frederick Gye	Succeeded by Joseph Neeld; Philip Pusey
Honorary titles
Preceded by Sir Charles Saxton	High Sheriff of Berkshire; 1825	Succeeded by William Mount
Preceded by William Lewis Hopkins	High Sheriff of Brecknockshire; 1831	Succeeded by James Pryce Gwynne Holford
