= John Bernard (MP for Wallingford) =

English politician

John Bernard (fl. 1387–1394) was an English politician. He sat as MP for Wallingford in September 1388.

He may have been related to a family of that name which owned land at Clapcot near Wallingford before 1370. He served as juror at a view of frankpledge in 1394.
