= Howbery Park =

Park in the UK

Coordinates: 51.6063°N 1.11182°W

Howbery Park is a 36-ha park located adjacent to the River Thames in Crowmarsh Gifford near Wallingford, UK. Its main feature is an English manor house built in about 1850 by Member of Parliament (MP) William Seymour Blackstone. Blackstone fell into debt, largely because of the building costs, which resulted in him spending time in the debtors' prison at Oxford and contributed to the end of his political career. He died in Brighton, never having lived at Howbery Park.

Other owners of Howbery Park were Henry Bertie Williams-Wynn (who purchased the house in 1867), Harvey du Cros (in 1902) and George Denison Faber, 1st Baron Wittenham.

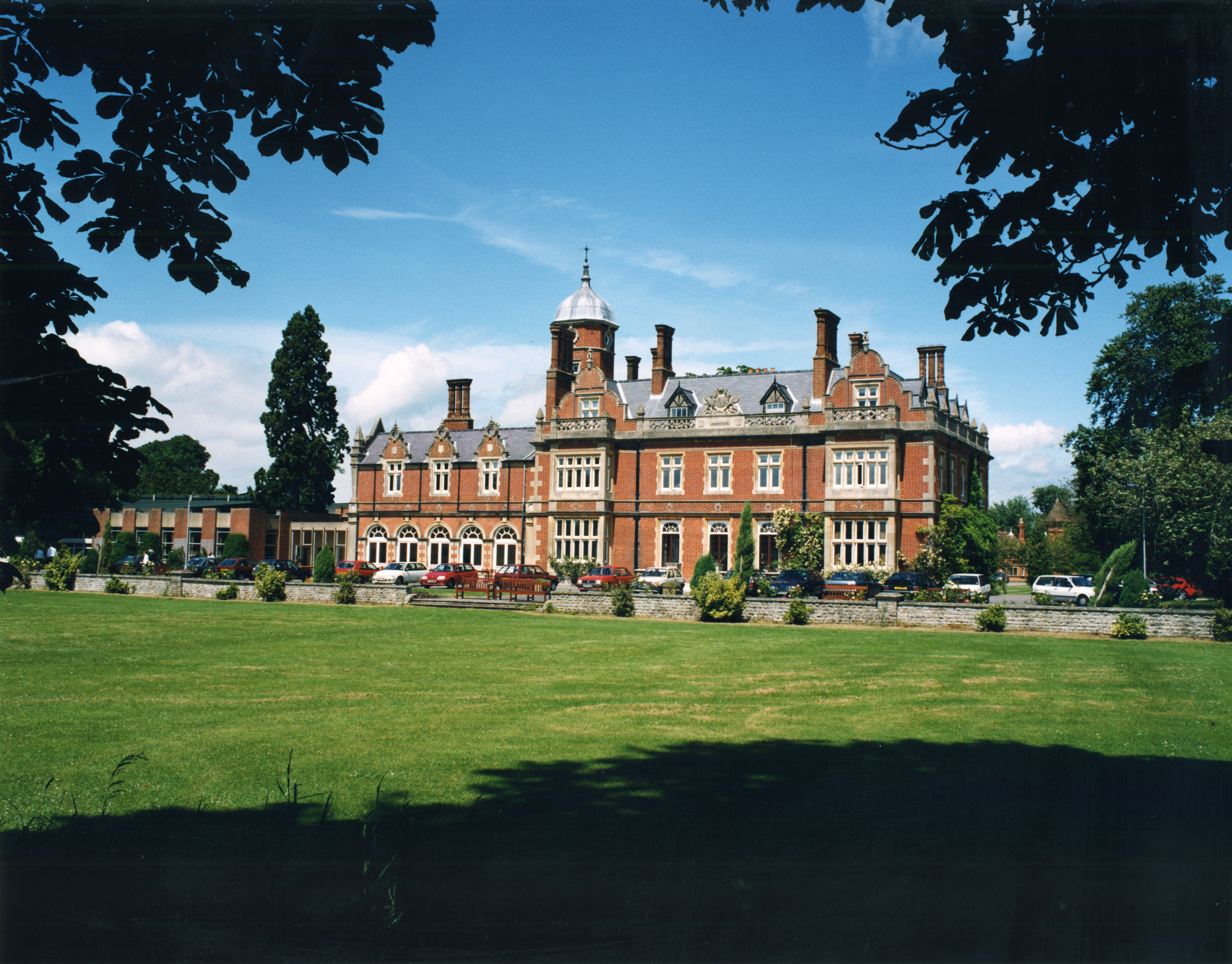
Manor House at Howbery Park

The estate passed into the ownership of the government in the 1930s and was used during the Second World War to house US, Polish and Canadian servicemen and then refugees from Central Europe. After the war, it was selected as the location for the new Hydraulics Research Station (HRS), established under the directorship of Sir Claude Inglis. HRS was privatised in 1982 from the Department of the Environment (DoE) and the HR Wallingford Group was created. The new company was limited by guarantee, had no shareholders and was given the remit to invest in hydraulic research. The assets transferred with Howbery Park in 1982 included the grant-funded-state-of-the-art- Fountain Building, and a new mainframe computer. The Manor House and Stable Block are Listed Buildings Grade II (1985).

In addition to HR Wallingford who occupy a new building, Kestrel House, several other organisations are now based in Howbery Park, including the Environment Agency.

There are several stories of strange occurrences concerning Howbery Park. The most common one is the ghost of the Lady in Grey. Several drivers on Benson Lane, adjacent to Howbery Park, claim to have been forced to swerve to avoid a lady dressed in grey who was walking in the road. A lady in grey was seen to walk in the grounds of the French Gardens, now the site of the South Oxfordshire District Council. Local stories are that this is the ghost of Lady Wittenham, wife of George Denison Faber, 1st Baron Wittenham.

In September 2007 key scenes for the feature-film adaptation of Philip Pullman's The Butterfly Tattoo (film) were shot on site.
