= Alexandre, vicomte Digeon =

Alexandre Elisabeth Michel, vicomte Digeon
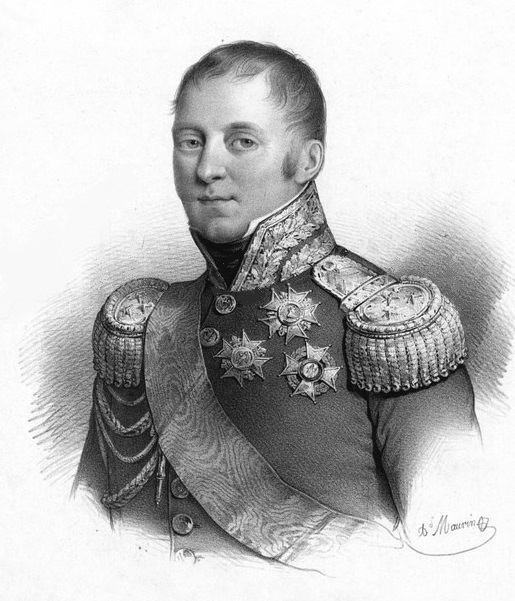
- Born: 27 June 1771; Paris, France
- Died: 2 August 1826 (aged 55) Ronqueux, France
- Allegiance: France
- Branch: Cavalry
- Rank: General of Division
- Conflicts: French Revolutionary Wars; Battle of Trebbia (1799); Napoleonic Wars; Battle of Austerlitz (WIA); Battle of Heilsberg; Battle of Friedland; Battle of Tudela; Battle of Morales; Battle of Vitoria (WIA)
- Awards: Legion of Honor (1805)
- Other work: Minister of War (1823)

Alexandre Elisabeth Michel, vicomte Digeon (French: [alɛksɑ̃dʁ elizabɛt miʃɛl də diʒɔ̃]; 27 June 1771 – 2 August 1826) fought in the French Revolutionary Wars in the cavalry. He became a general officer during the Napoleonic Wars, fighting in a number of important battles. After 1814, he gave his loyalty to the Bourbon Restoration and briefly served as Minister of War.

== Early career ==
Born in Paris, France, on 27 June 1771, Digeon was the son of a Ferme générale, a tax collector. He entered the army as a lieutenant in the 104th Infantry Regiment, and after a few months transferred to the 9th Chasseurs à cheval Regiment. Appointed chef d'escadron (captain) in the 19th Dragoon Regiment, he was wounded by a bayonet attack on the bridge of Kehl. Later at the Battle of Trebbia, he became the acting commander of the regiment after the death of his colonel. His younger brother was wounded at the Battle of Marengo, where he served in the Artillery of the Consular Guard. Napoleon Bonaparte sent Colonel Jean-Baptiste Bessières to Digeon's father to give him the news. Père Digeon asked for a favor for his eldest son, which Napoleon granted. Digeon returned to France and was appointed colonel of the 26th Chasseurs à cheval Regiment.

== Napoleonic Wars ==
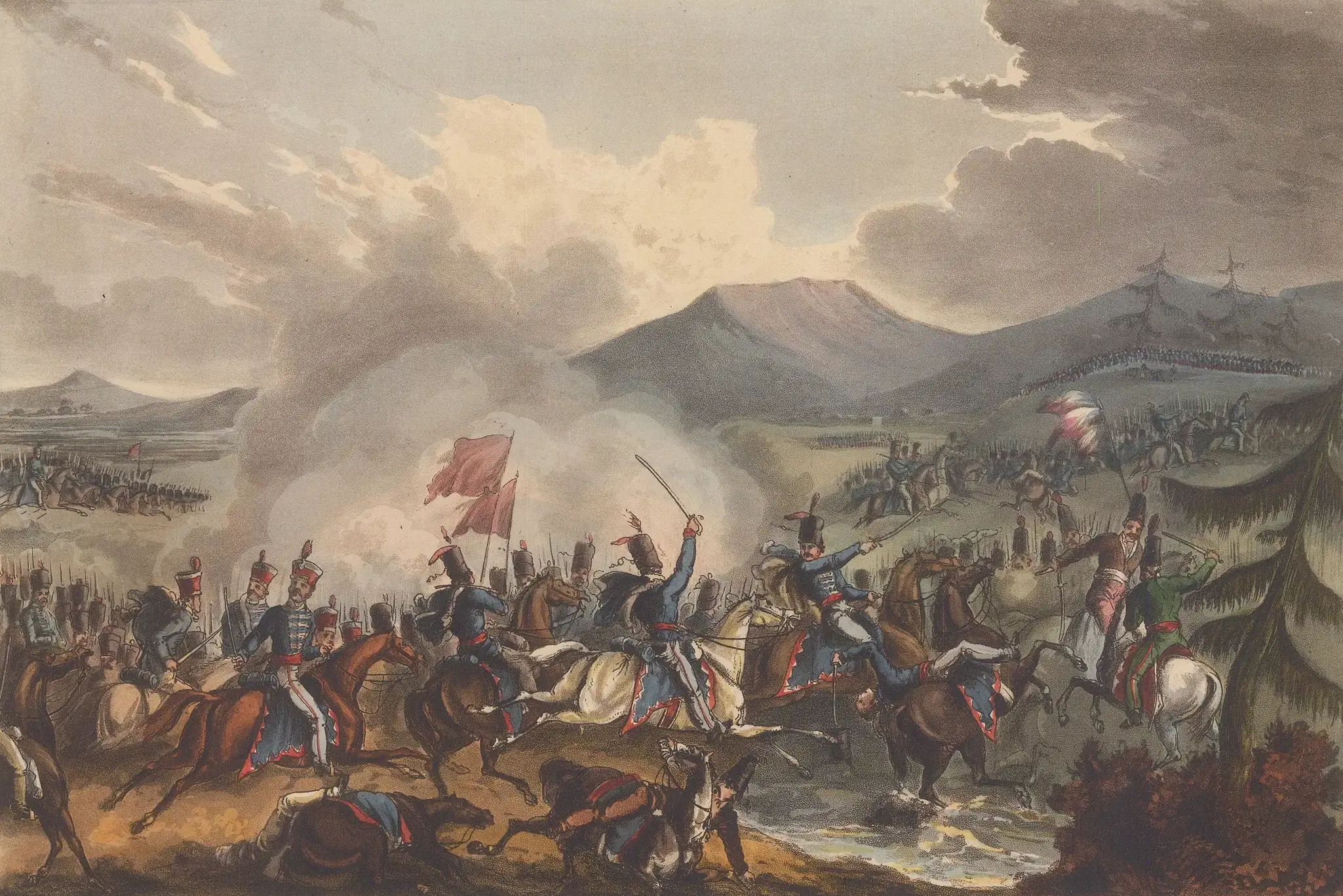
The Battle of Morales, where Digeon commanded a French cavalry detachment

Still leading the 26th Chasseurs, Digeon took part in the Ulm Campaign in 1805, including Lensberg, and Battle of Austerlitz, where he took three standards. He received the decoration of Commander of the Legion of Honor after the battle, where he was wounded. He was near Stralsund in 1807. Elevated to the rank of general of brigade, he served in General Marie Victor de Fay, marquis de Latour-Maubourg's 1st Dragoon Division as the brigadier in command of the 20th and 25th Dragoons. The same year he commanded with great distinction in the Battle of Heilsberg and in the Battle of Friedland.

Assigned to Spain, he commanded a dragoon brigade under Marshal Jean Lannes. On 23 November 1808, he fought in the Battle of Tudela where Francisco Castaños was defeated. Appointed in 1812 the civilian and military governor of the provinces of Córdoba and Jaén, he managed by a wise administration, to win the trust of people that the ravages of war had angered and reduced to the deepest misery. For six months, he kept over 7,000 people from suffering famine.

By his brilliant leadership during Marshal Nicolas Soult's retreat from Andalusia, Digeon was promoted to divisional general on 3 March 1813 and commanded a detachment of French cavalry that was defeated at Morales on 2 June. He subsequently fought at the Battle of Vitoria on 21 June, where he was wounded for the fifth time. At the end of that year he went to the Army of Catalonia under Marshal Louis Gabriel Suchet, and was in command of all the cavalry and the First Infantry Division.

Seconded in 1814 to the army defending Lyon, commanded by Marshal Pierre Augereau, he led a notable feat of arms. On 20 March 1814, the Austrians had advanced to the suburb of Saint-Just-d'Avray and street fighting began. Digeon suddenly resumed the offensive, captured a battery, and cut off part of the Austrian Hiller Infantry Regiment # 2 with nearly 400 prisoners. This setback arrested the progress of the enemy. The Allied occupation of Lyon only took place the next day under a formal capitulation, which spared the city the pillaging that often occurred when a large city was stormed.

== Restoration ==
After the Bourbon Restoration, Digeon was employed as inspector general of cavalry. He was in that capacity at Nevers, when the Emperor Napoleon I of France returned from Elba. The minister of war appointed him to command a cavalry division at Lyon. He arrived there on 5 March, but after many fruitless efforts to keep the soldiers from joining Napoleon, he left that city with the Jacques Macdonald, Duke of Taranto. King Louis XVIII appointed him aide-de-camp. Digeon declined to serve Napoleon during the Hundred Days. In return, the restored king appointed him commander of the Cavalry Division of the Royal Guard, and later created him a peer of France with the title of Viscount.

In the Upper House, he constantly supported the rightist policy and the ensuing ministerial system. In political trials he voted for the party rigorously. In March 1823, in the absence of Claude Victor-Perrin, Duke of Belluno, he was appointed Acting Minister of War. Three months afterward he was appointed Minister of State and member of the Privy Council, then commander of the army of occupation. He died on 2 August 1826 at his estate at Ronqueux, near Paris. He had married, shortly before his death, a lady of the house of Saulx Tavannes. The name DIGEON is inscribed on Column 22 of the Arc de Triomphe.

== Sources ==
=== Books ===
- «Alexandre Elisabeth Michel Digeon», dans Charles Mullié, Biographie des célébrités militaires des armées de terre et de mer de 1789 à 1850, 1852
- Smith, Digby. The Napoleonic Wars Data Book. London: Greenhill, 1998. ISBN 1-85367-276-9

Political offices
Preceded by Claude Victor-Perrin, Duc de Belluno	Minister of War; 23 March 1823 - 15 April 1823	Succeeded by Claude Victor-Perrin, Duc de Belluno
