= Baron Dinorben =

Title in the Peerage of the United Kingdom

Baron Dinorben, of Kinmel Hall in the County of Denbigh, was a title in the Peerage of the United Kingdom. It was created on 10 September 1831 for William Hughes, the long-standing Whig Member of Parliament for Wallingford. He was succeeded by his younger and only surviving son, the second Baron. On his early death on 6 October 1852, only eight months after the death of his father, the barony became extinct.

== Barons Dinorben (1831) ==
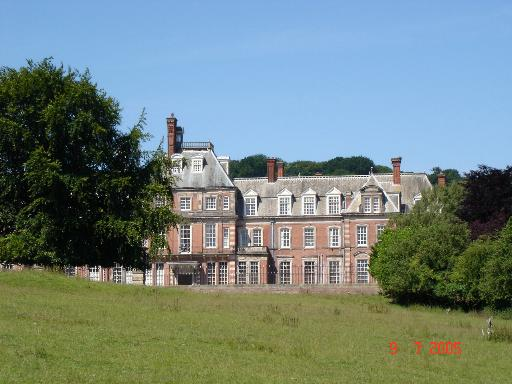
Kinmel Hall- the family seat

- William Lewis Hughes, 1st Baron Dinorben (1767–1852)
- William Lewis Hughes, 2nd Baron Dinorben (1821–1852)
