= Thomas Saunders (born 1626) =

Member of the Parliament of England

Thomas Saunders (1626 – c. 1670) was an English landowner and politician who sat in the House of Commons in 1660.

Saunders was the son of John Saunders of Reading and Woolstone in Berkshire (the latter now in Oxfordshire) and his wife Margaret Evelyn, daughter of John Evelyn of Godstone, Surrey. He succeeded his father in 1638 and purchased the estate of Mongewell Park in Oxfordshire, across the River Thames from Wallingford, also in Berkshire (but now in Oxfordshire). In 1660, he was elected Member of Parliament for Wallingford in a by-election to the Convention Parliament. He was commissioner for assessment for Berkshire from August 1660 and for Oxfordshire from 1661. He was J.P. for Oxfordshire from 1661, and for Wallingford and for Berkshire from 1664.

Saunders died between 25 October 1669 when he made his will and 15 February 1671 when it was proved.

Saunders married twice: Firstly to Anne daughter of Thomas Morris of Great Coxwell in Berkshire (now Oxfordshire) and had two sons and a daughter; Secondly to Anne daughter of John Allen and widow of Dudley Avery, both of Streatley, also in Berkshire.

Parliament of England
Preceded by Robert Packer; Hungerford Dunch	Member of Parliament for Wallingford; 1660; With: Robert Packer	Succeeded by Robert Packer; Hon. George Fane
