= William Hughes, 1st Baron Dinorben =

Welsh mine owner and politician

William Lewis Hughes, 1st Baron Dinorben (10 November 1767 – 10 February 1852), was a Welsh copper mine owner, philanthropist and Whig politician.

Hughes was the son of Reverend Edward Hughes, of Kinmel Hall, Denbighshire, and Mary, daughter of Robert Lewis, Rector of Trefdraeth. Mary had inherited the Llysdulas estate on Anglesey from her uncle, including Parys Mountain, which later became the largest copper mine in Europe and gained the Hughes family great wealth. The Kinmel estate in Denbighshire was acquired by Reverend Edward Hughes in 1786.

William Lewis Hughes was returned to parliament as one of two representatives for Wallingford in 1802, a seat he held until 1831. The latter year he was raised to the peerage as Baron Dinorben, of Kinmel in the County of Denbigh. He was also a philanthropist and notably founded a free school for local girls at Kinmel.

He was appointed Major-Commandant of the Royal Anglesey Militia on 19 April 1803 and commanded the unit on the South Coast of England during the invasion crisis of 1805. He remained the commanding officer, with the personal rank of Colonel, until his death.

Lord Dinorben died in February 1852, aged 84, and was succeeded in the barony by his younger but only surviving son, William. William was disabled and the title became extinct on his early death only eight months after succeeding in the title. Kinmel was passed on to the late Baron's cousin, Hugh Robert Hughes, who became known as "HRH", a reflection of his grand lifestyle.

Parliament of the United Kingdom
Preceded by Sir Francis Sykes, Bt; The Lord Eardley	Member of Parliament for Wallingford; 1802–1831; With: Sir Francis Sykes, Bt 1802–1804; George Galway Mills 1804–1806; Richard Benyon 1806–1812; Ebenezer Fuller Maitland 1812–1820; George James Robarts 1820–1826; Robert Knight 1826–1831	Succeeded by Robert Knight; Thomas Leigh
Peerage of the United Kingdom
New creation	Baron Dinorben; 1831–1852	Succeeded by William Lewis Hughes
