= Stanley Vickers (MP) =

Stanley Vickers (31 October 1837 – 24 February 1872) was an English distiller and Conservative Party politician who sat in the House of Commons from 1868 to 1872.

== Early life and career ==
Vickers was the son of John Vickers of Hill House, Streatham Common, and Southwark. He was educated at King's College School. and became a distiller and merchant. He was managing partner and half proprietor of J. and J. Vickers and Co. distillery. He was captain commanding the 5th Kent Artillery Volunteers and was a member of the committee in favour of the Reduction of the Duty on Fire Insurance.

At the 1868 general election Vickers was elected as the member of parliament (MP) for Wallingford. He held the seat until his death aged 34 in 1872.

== Personal life ==
Vickers married Mary Ianthe Dunbar, daughter of William Dunbar, merchant of Aberdeen and London.

Parliament of the United Kingdom
Preceded by Sir Wentworth Dilke, Bt	Member of Parliament for Wallingford; 1868 – 1972	Succeeded by Edward Wells
