= Richard Benyon De Beauvoir =

British politician, landowner and philanthropist

Richard Benyon De Beauvoir (born Benyon; 28 April 1770 – 22 March 1854) was a 19th-century British politician, landowner, philanthropist, and High Sheriff of Berkshire.

== Background and early life ==
He was born in Westminster, the eldest son of the politician Richard Benyon, of Gidea Hall in Essex and Englefield House, Berkshire, and his wife Hannah Hulse, the eldest daughter of Sir Edward Hulse, 1st Baronet of Breamore House, Hampshire. He was one of four sons and five daughters. He was educated at Charterhouse School, and was admitted to St John's College, Cambridge in 1787, graduating B.A. in 1792 and M.A. in 1795.

== Estates and names ==
Richard Benyon succeeded to his father's considerable estates in 1796. In 1814, after succeeding to the estates of his half-uncle Powlett Wrighte of Englefield House (who had died in 1779) he assumed the name of Richard Powlett-Wrighte. However, in 1822, he inherited over £1 million (equivalent to £109,852,000 in 2025) and significant property from distant relative, the Rev. Peter De Beauvoir, Rector of Davenham in Essex, at which time he dropped Powlett-Wrighte and assumed the name of Benyon De Beauvoir.

In 1824, he purchased the Culford Estate, near Bury St Edmunds, Suffolk, for £230,000 (equivalent to £21,832,000 in 2025), including the timber, from Louisa, Marchioness Cornwallis, widow of Charles Cornwallis, 2nd Marquess Cornwallis. The 11,000-acre (45 km^{2}) estate also included the parishes of Culford, Ingham, Timworth, West Stow and Wordwell.

He was reputed to be worth over £7 million (equivalent to £768,964,000 in 2025). His land agent was Robert Todd and his head gardener was William Armstrong and these two men dealt with day-to-day work on the estate, particularly when Benyon was not in residence. New flint and brick estate workers' cottages were under construction at Culford, as can be seen in letters between Benyon de Beauvoir and Robert Todd.

The dwellings won an award for their sensible design; they still stand along Main Road, Culford, today, surrounded by their large gardens. In letters dated 19 April and 6 May 1825, Todd writes that the Armstrongs have a troublesome marriage; "she has experienced not only insult but blows" and, in the later letter, "P.S. Armstrong and his wife are parted. She left Culford last Tuesday, is in lodgings in Bury at present."

However, in December 1840, Benyond de Beauvoir shut down Culford's public house, The White Hart (now known as Benyon Lodge), because he regarded it as "a scene of moral debauchery".

== Offices and charitable works ==
Richard Benyon De Beauvoir was a member of parliament (MP) for Pontefract from 1802 to 1806, and for Wallingford during two parliaments, from 1806 to 1812. He was a Justice of the Peace and Deputy Lieutenant for the county of Berkshire. He was High Sheriff of Berkshire in 1816.

When the Royal Berkshire Hospital was founded at Reading in 1839, Benyon contributed the sum of £5,000 (equivalent to £448,000 in 2025). A ward in the hospital was subsequently named after him. At his death, he was considered "by far the richest commoner" in Berkshire.

== Personal life ==
He married, on 27 September 1797, Elizabeth, only daughter of Sir Francis Sykes, 1st Baronet of Basildon Park, Berkshire. She died on 29 October 1822; the couple had no children. He died on 22 March 1854.

== Will ==
Benyon De Beauvoir's real estate was devised into trusts managed by two trustees: his nephew Richard Fellowes, the son of his sister Emma Benyon Fellowes and William Henry Fellowes (who also took on the name of Benyon); and William Mount. The will devised onto Richard Fellowes and William Mount "all his real estates in England upon trust that they should convey and settle his manors, farms, land, titles, and hereditament" for the caretaking of various beneficiaries, including income and profits from the estates and trusts, during their lifetimes.

This will resulted in multiple complications and several lawsuits, beginning with Berens v Berens 1854. Some of the lands included estates inherited from Peter de Beauvoir, which had provisions (which predated Benyon de Beauvoir's ownership) allowing tenants to remain for life. Some of the land was sold to the Berks and Hants Railway, which brought the question of which beneficiaries could profit from the sale.

Benyon de Beauvoir planned for some of his estate to go to his great-nephew Henry Berens (1804–1883), with remainder to Henry's heirs male, and in default, to Benyon De Beauvoir's "right heirs". His "right heirs" at the time of his death included three living sisters and his late sister's five daughters (four unmarried). His living sisters were Emma Benyon Fellowes, Charlotte Benyon Berens, and the unmarried Frances Benyon. His late sister Maria Benyon Brodick, Viscountess Midleton, the widow of George Brodrick, 4th Viscount Midleton, had died in 1852, leaving a son (George Brodrick, 5th Viscount Midleton) and five daughters (four unmarried): Hon. Maria Brodrick (28 March 1799 – 11 April 1893), Harriet Brodrick (who married her cousin, Very Rev. William Brodrick, 7th Viscount Midleton), Hon. Charlotte Brodrick (18 February 1801 – 12 April 1863), Hon. Emma Brodrick (13 August 1807 – 5 April 1894), Hon. Lucy Brodrick (3 July 1809 – 31 December 1895).

Following Henry Berens'sdeath in 1883 without male issue, the lawsuit Berens v Fellowes contested the question of whether or not the female "right heirs" could subsequently pass on their part of the trust to their own heirs. The Chancery Court decided that the estates were vested with the four surviving daughters of the deceased sister but would not pass to their heirs.

The 1883 edition of The Great Landowners of Great Britain and Ireland listed farmland inherited from Benyon de Beauvoir. His nephew, Rev. Edward Richard Benyon, inherited Culford Hall, Bury St. Edmunds, (1802–1883), and held in Suffolk 10,060 acres (worth 6,928 per annum rental), in Essex 601 acres (worth 848 guineas per annum), and in Huntingdon 3 acres (worth 8 guineas per annum). Additionally Richard Fellowes Benyon, of Englefield, held in Berkshire 10,129 acres (worth 13,303 guineas per annum); in Essex 3,438 acres (worth 5,163 guineas per annum); and in Hampshire 2,440 acres (worth 1,538 guineas per annum).

== Sources ==
- The Gentleman's Magazine & Historical Review 1854
- De Beauvoir Conservation Area Extension, Conservation Area Appraisal, London Borough of Hackney, 1998.

Parliament of the United Kingdom
Preceded by Viscount Galway; John Smyth	Member of Parliament for Pontefract; 1802–1806; With: John Smyth	Succeeded by Robert Pemberton Milnes; John Smyth
Preceded by George Galway Mills; William Hughes	Member of Parliament for Wallingford; 1806–1812; With: William Hughes	Succeeded by Ebenezer Fuller Maitland; William Hughes
Honorary titles
Preceded by John Willes	High Sheriff of Berkshire; 1816	Succeeded by William Stone
