= Richard Hottoft =

Rector of St Mary's, Oldswinford (c. 1575–1641)

- Born: c. 1575
- Died: 1641 (aged 65–66); Worcester,
- Other names: Richard Hottofte, Richard Hottoste
- Spouse: Joyce Hottoft

Richard Hottoft (c. 1575–1641) was rector of St Mary's, Oldswinford in Worcestershire.

== History ==
Hottoft was educated at Trinity College, Cambridge, matriculating c 1593. He was awarded his BA (1596/7) and his MA in 1600. He was instituted twice as rector by Gervase Babington. Bishop of Worcester. On 29 March 1602 he was instituted with his patron being given as Meriel Lyttelton widow of John Lyttelton and guardian of her son, Thomas Lyttelton, a minor. Hottoft was instituted for a second time on 1 May 1602 with the patron given as Queen Elizabeth I.

As rector, he was a trustee of the Stourbridge almshouses. He was buried at St Mary's, Oldswinford, on 24 September 1641 his will including a gift of £10 to the poor of the parish of Oldswinford.

Hottoft and his wife, Joyce, owned land locally including at Eccleshall and Stourbridge, Bedcote and Oldswinford.

Church of England titles
Preceded by Richard Maunsill	Rector of St Mary's Oldswinford; 1602 –1641	Succeeded by William Harewell
