= John Mercham =

English politician

John Mercham (fl. 1406–1428) was an English politician. He sat as MP for Wallingford in May 1421 and 1425.

He also served as alderman of Wallingford from Michaelmas 1420 till 1421.
