= Nicholas Tannore =

English Member of Parliament

Nicholas Tanner or Tannore, was an English Member of Parliament (MP). He was a Member of the Parliament of England for Wallingford in 1368 and 1369.
