= John Stone (MP for Wallingford) =

Former MP For Wallingford

Member of the English Parliament for Wallingford
- In office 1679–1681
- In office 1685–1689

Personal details
- Party: Tory

John Stone (fl. 1679 – 1704) was a Tory Member of Parliament serving two non-consecutive terms representing Wallingford. His first term was noted for his opposition to the Exclusion Bill. He likely did not stand for re-election in 1681; however, he ran again in 1685 and won; however, after that he never held office again.
