= Wentworth Dilke =

English art patron, horticulturalist and Whig politician

Sir Charles Wentworth Dilke 1st baronet
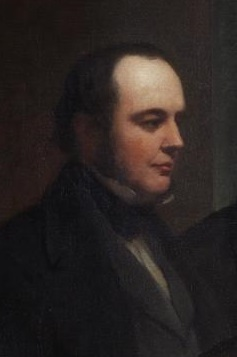
- Born: 18 February 1810; London, England
- Died: 10 May 1869 (aged 59); London, England
- Education: Trinity Hall, Cambridge
- Occupations: Politician; Writer; Journalist
- Known for: Member of the 19th Parliament of the United Kingdom; The Athenaeum
- Spouse: Mary Chattfield (1840–1853)
- Children: Sir Charles Dilke, 2nd Baronet; Ashton Wentworth Dilke; Mildred Dilke
- Parent(s): Charles Wentworth Dilke and Maria Dove Walker

Sir Charles Wentworth Dilke, 1st Baronet (18 February 1810 – 10 May 1869), was an English art patron, horticulturalist and Whig politician. He is best remembered as one of the chief promoters of the Great Exhibition of 1851.

== Background and education ==
Dilke was born in London, the son of Charles Wentworth Dilke, proprietor and editor of the Athenaeum, and his wife Maria Dove Walker.

He was educated at Westminster School and Trinity Hall, Cambridge. He helped pass the Reform Act 1832, enacted under the Whig administration of Lord Grey. He studied law, and in 1834 took his degree of LL.B., but did not practise.

== Public life ==
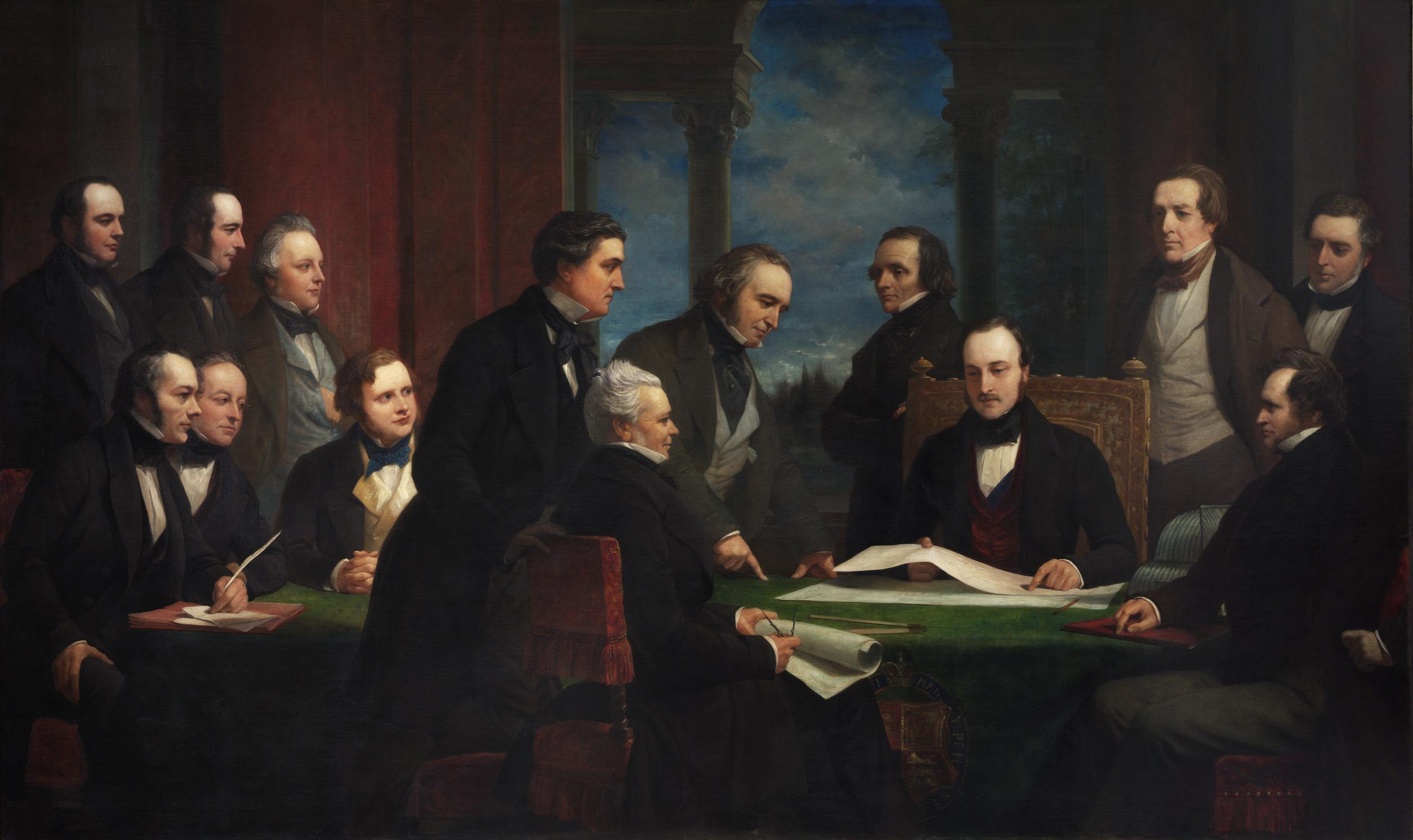
The Royal Commissioners for the Exhibition of 1851 by Henry Wyndham Phillips. Dilke is on the left of the group portrait

Dilke assisted his father in his literary work, and was for some years chairman of the council of the Society of Arts, besides taking a prominent part in the affairs of the Royal Horticultural Society and other bodies. In 1841 he co-founded The Gardeners' Chronicle alongside Joseph Paxton, John Lindley and William Bradbury. He was one of the most zealous promoters of the Great Exhibition of 1851 (of which Paxton was again an integral part), and a member of the executive committee. At the close of the exhibition, he was honoured by foreign sovereigns, and the queen offered him knighthood, which, however, he did not accept. He also declined a large remuneration offered by the royal commission. In 1853 Dilke was one of the English commissioners at the New York Industrial Exhibition, and prepared a report on it. He again declined to receive any monetary reward for his services.

Dilke was appointed one of the five royal commissioners for the Great Exhibition of 1862. Soon after the death of the prince consort he was created a baronet, of Sloane Street in the County of Middlesex. In 1865 he entered parliament as member for Wallingford, a seat he held until 1868. In 1869 he was sent to Russia as a representative of England at the horticultural exhibition held at St Petersburg. His health, however, had been for some time failing, and he died suddenly in that city, on 10 May 1869. A selection from his writings, Papers of a Critic (2 vols., 1875), contains a biographical sketch by his eldest son Charles.

== Family ==
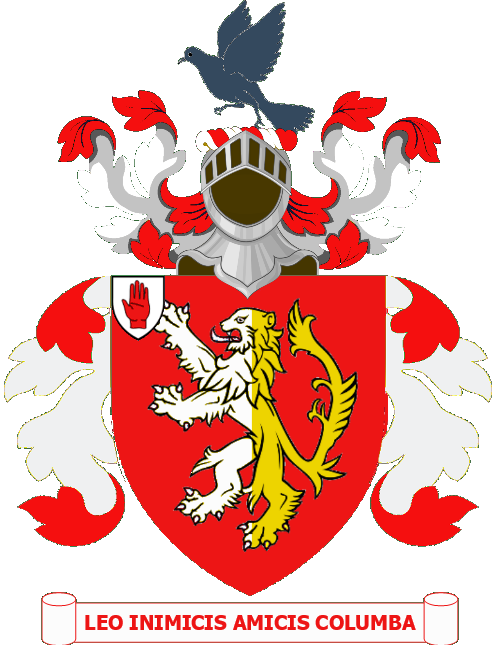
Achievement of arms

Dilke married Mary, daughter of William and Caroline Augusta (née Duncombe) Chatfield, in 1840. Mary died in September 1853. Dilke was succeeded in the baronetcy by his eldest son, Charles, whose promising political career was destroyed by a well-publicised divorce case in the 1880s. Dilke's younger son Ashton Wentworth Dilke was also a politician.

Coat of arms of Wentworth Dilke

Crest
A dove Proper.
Escutcheon
Gules a lion rampant per pale Argent and Or.
Motto
Leo Inimicis Amicis Columba; Love And Honour

== Honours ==
In 1871, English botanist Maxwell T. Masters published a genus of plants from tropical South America called Dilkea after Wentworth Dilke.

Parliament of the United Kingdom
Preceded by Richard Malins	Member of Parliament for Wallingford; 1865–1868	Succeeded by Stanley Vickers
Baronetage of the United Kingdom
New creation	Baronet (of Sloane Street); 1862–1869	Succeeded by Charles Dilke
