= Dilke baronets =

Baronetcy in the Baronetage of the United Kingdom

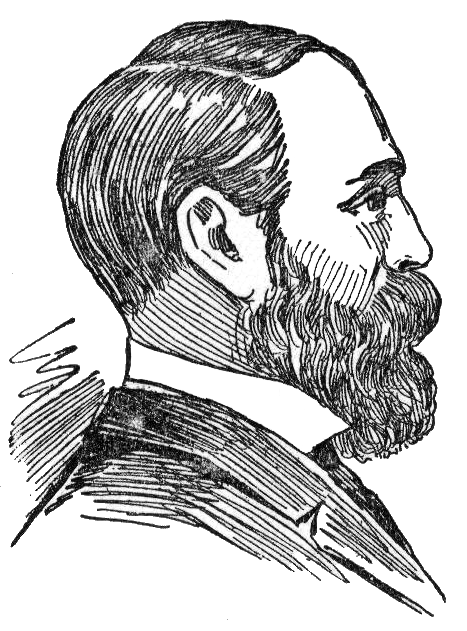
Sir Charles Dilke, 2nd Baronet

The Dilke Baronetcy, of Sloane Street in the County of Middlesex, is a title in the Baronetage of the United Kingdom. It was created on 22 January 1862 for the Liberal politician Wentworth Dilke. Apart from his political career, he played an important part in the international exhibititions in London in 1851 and 1862. Dilke was the son of the critic and writer on literature Charles Wentworth Dilke. He was succeeded by his son, the 2nd Baronet. He was also a Liberal politician and served under William Ewart Gladstone as Parliamentary Under-Secretary of State for Foreign Affairs from 1880 to 1882 and as President of the Local Government Board from 1882 to 1885. His political career ended in 1885, after a well-publicised divorce case.

The Dilke family is descended from Fisher Dilke, son of Thomas Dilke, of Maxstoke Castle, who married Sybil Wentworth.

== Dilke baronets, of Sloane Street (1862) ==
- Sir (Charles) Wentworth Dilke, 1st Baronet (1810–1869)
- Sir Charles Wentworth Dilke, 2nd Baronet (1843–1911)
- Sir Charles Wentworth Dilke, 3rd Baronet (1874–1918)
- Sir Fisher Wentworth Dilke, 4th Baronet (1877–1944)
- Sir John Fisher Wentworth Dilke, 5th Baronet (1906–1998)
- The Rev. Sir Charles John Wentworth Dilke, Cong. Orat. 6th Baronet (1937–2022), from 1966 a priest of the London Oratory.
- Sir Timothy Fisher Wentworth Dilke, 7th Baronet (born 1938),

The heir apparent is his son Felix Wentworth Dilke (born 1967).

== Extended family ==
Oswald A. W. Dilke, son of Clement Wentworth Dilke, younger brother of the 4th Baronet, was a classical scholar and philologist.

Coat of arms of Dilke baronets
Crest A dove Proper. Escutcheon Gules a lion rampant per pale Argent and Or. Motto Leo Inimicis Amicis Columba (a lion to enemies, to friends a dove); alternately Love And Honour
