= 1872 Wallingford by-election =

UK Parliamentary by-election

Wallingford held a by-election on 9 March 1872 because of the death of the incumbent MP of the Conservative Party, Stanley Vickers. It was won by the Conservative candidate Edward Wells, who was unopposed.
