= William Harewell =

English Anglican cleric of the 17th century

- Born: c. 1616
- Died: 1667 (aged 50–51); Worcester, England
- Spouse: Elizabeth Harewell
- Children: 7

William Harewell (c. 1616 – 1667) was rector of St Mary's, Oldswinford in Worcestershire until removed from office during the Puritan revolution. After the ejection of Puritan ministers, he was vicar of St Peter the Great, Worcester, and a minor canon of Worcester Cathedral.

== Life ==
William Har(e)well was a son of Henry Harwell of Coventry being born c. 1616. He was educated at Oriel College, Oxford, matriculating 31 October 1634 at the age of 18. He was awarded his BA on 11 February 1636.

Harewell was installed as rector of Oldswinford, Worcestershire on 2 September 1641. He petitioned a Parliamentary Committee to instruct the county committee to end proceedings against him (July 1646) but was still sequestered after the First English Civil War. The date of the end of his period as rector is not recorded but his successor was in post by 1648.

At the Restoration, Harewell had an association with the church of St Michael's, Worcester. He is recorded as conducting a service of thanksgiving for the restoration of King Charles II on 24 May 1660 and a funeral for Dorothea Townshend on 5 June 1660, being the first prayers said for the dead in Worcester since 24 July 1646. Harewell was appointed vicar of St Peter the Great, Worcester by 1663, (still being in post by 1666) and was described as a minor canon of Worcester Cathedral in 1664. He died in 1667.

Church of England titles
| Preceded by Richard Hottoft | Rector of St Mary's Oldswinford; 1641 –1648 | Succeeded by Gervase Bryan |
