= Richard Malins =

English barrister, judge and politician

Sir Richard Malins (9 March 1805 – 15 January 1882) was an English barrister, judge, and politician.

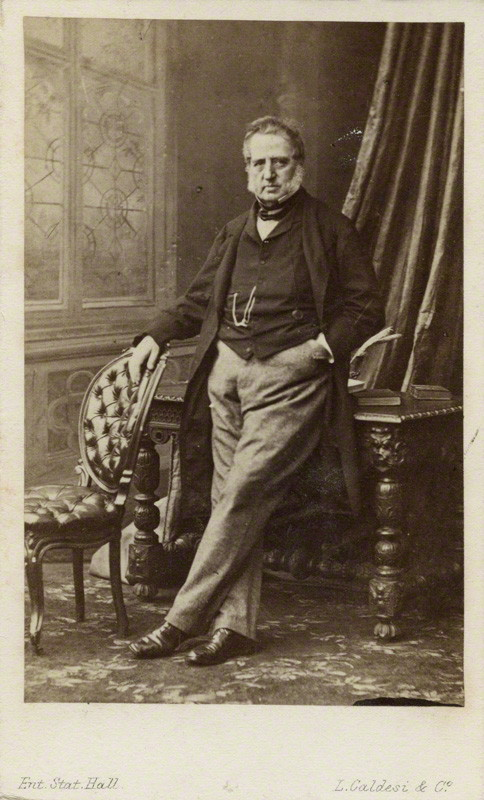
Richard Malins, 1860s photograph

== Early life ==
The third son of William Malins of Ailston, Warwickshire, by his wife Mary, eldest daughter of Thomas Hunter of Pershore, Worcestershire, and was born at Evesham on 9 March 1805. He was educated at a private school, and then entered Caius College, Cambridge in 1823, where he graduated B.A. in 1827. He had already joined the Inner Temple in 1825, and was called to the bar 14 May 1830.

Malins practised as an equity draughtsman and conveyancer in Fig Tree Court, Temple, and later in New Square and in Stone Buildings, Lincoln's Inn. He made his way professionally without backing, interest, concentrated on real property law and the interpretation of wills, and built up a court practice in equity. He trained in his chambers numerous pupils, including Hugh Cairns who was his assistant for some time.

In 1849 Malins transferred his membership from the Inner Temple to Lincoln's Inn, and was made a bencher, acting as treasurer in 1870. In 1849 also he was appointed Queen's Counsel, and developed a business as leader in the court of Vice-chancellors Parker and Stuart.

== In parliament ==
Malins sat in the House of Commons as a Conservative for Wallingford from 1852 to July 1865, when he was defeated by Charles Wentworth Dilke. He was a frequent parliamentary speaker, joining in the opposition to the Divorce Bill 1857, and had protectionist views. He carried two bills successfully through parliament, the Infant Settlements Act 1855, and the Married Women's Reversionary Interests Act 1857.

== Judge ==
On 1 December 1866 Malins was appointed a Vice-Chancellor of England, in succession to Sir Richard Kindersley, and was knighted in 1867. Early in 1879 he was lamed by a fall from his horse, was seized with paralysis early in 1881, and in March 1881 he retired and was sworn of the privy council.

Malins died at his house in Lowndes Square, London, 15 January 1882, and was buried 21 January at Bray, Berkshire.

== Family ==
Malins married in 1831 Susannah, elder daughter of the Rev. Arthur Farwell, rector of St. Martin's, Cornwall; she died in the last days of 1881. He left no family.

== Arms ==
Coat of arms of Richard Malins
Crest An arm in armour Proper couped below the elbow holding in the hand a crescent Argent. Escutcheon Sable a fess paly of five Or and Argent. Motto Post Proelia Proemlia

== Notes ==
Attribution

This article incorporates text from a publication now in the public domain: Lee, Sidney, ed. (1893). "Malins, Richard". Dictionary of National Biography. Vol. 35. London: Smith, Elder & Co.
