= Morales de Toro =

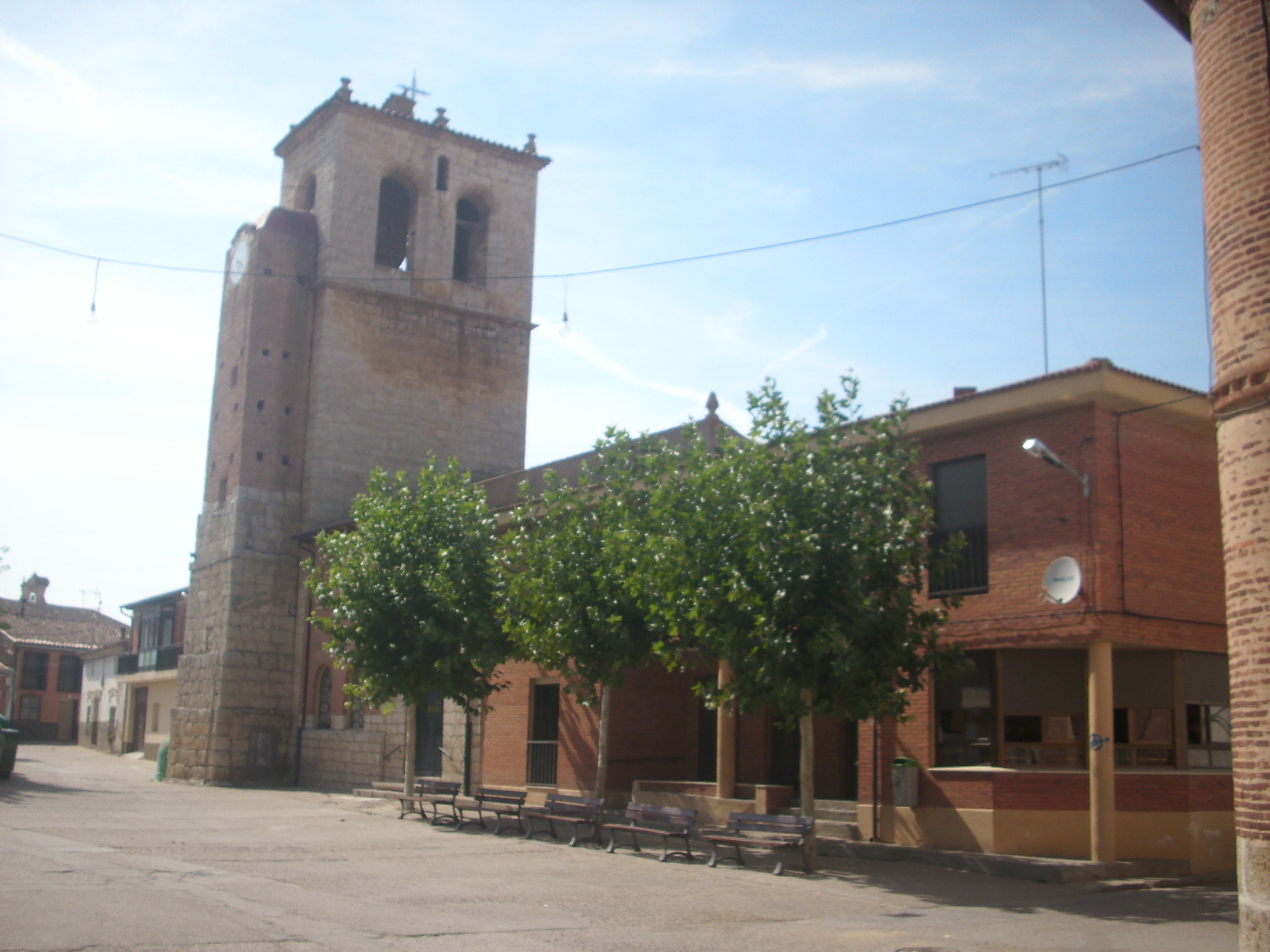

- Coat of arms
- Interactive map of Morales de Toro
- Coordinates: 41°32′N 5°18′W
- Country: Spain
- Autonomous community: Castile and León
- Province: Zamora
- Municipality: Morales de Toro

Area
  - Total: 53 km^{2} (20 sq mi)

Population (2025-01-01)
  - Total: 918
  - Density: 17/km^{2} (45/sq mi)
- Time zone: UTC+1 (CET)
  - Summer (DST): UTC+2 (CEST)

Morales de Toro is a municipality located in the province of Zamora, Castile and León, Spain. According to the 2004 census (INE), the municipality has a population of 1,078 inhabitants.
