= List of baronetcies in the Baronetage of the United Kingdom: H =

Peerages and baronetcies of Britain and Ireland
Extant	All
Dukes	Dukedoms
Marquesses	Marquessates
Earls	Earldoms
Viscounts	Viscountcies
Barons	Baronies
Baronets	Baronetcies
En, Ire, NS, GB, UK (extinct)

This is a list of baronetcies in the Baronetage of the United Kingdom. They have been created since 1801 when they replaced the baronetages in the Baronetage of Great Britain, and Baronetage of Ireland. This list is not currently complete.

Title	Date of creation	Surname	Current status	Notes
Hacking of Altham	1938	Hacking	extant	first Baronet created Baron Hacking in 1945
Hadfield of Sheffield	1917	Hadfield	extinct 1940	
Halford of Wistow	1809	Halford	extinct 1897	Sir Henry Halford, Royal physician 1793-1844
Hall of Burton Park	1919	Hall	extant	
Hall of Grafham	1923	Hall	extant	
Hall of Llanover	1838	Hall	extinct 1867	first Baronet created Baron Llanover in 1859
Halsey of Gaddesdon	1920	Halsey	extant	
Hambling of Oxford	1924	Hambling	extant	
Hamilton of Cadogan Square	1892	Hamilton	extinct 1928	
Hamilton of Ilford	1937	Hamilton	extinct 1992	
Hamilton of Marlborough House	1819	Hamilton	extant	second Baronet succeeded to the Hamilton Baronetcy of Trebinshun in 1851
Hamilton of Woodbrook	1814	Hamilton	extinct 1876	
Hammick of Green Hayes	1834	Hammick	extant	
Hansen of Bideford	1921	Hansen	extinct 1958	
Hanson of Bryanston Square	1887	Hanson	extinct 1996	Lord Mayor of London
Hanson of Fowey	1918	Hanson	extant	Lord Mayor of London
Hardinge of Belle Isle	1801	Hardinge	dormant	fifth Baronet died 1968; see also the Viscount Hardinge
Hardy of Dunstall Hall	1876	Hardy	extant	
Hardy of the Navy	1806	Hardy	extinct 1839	
Hare of Stow Hall	1818	Hare	extant	
Hare of Stow Hall	1905	Hare	extinct 1941	
Harford of Falcondale	1934	Harford	extant	
Harland of Ormiston and Brompton	1885	Harland	extinct 1895	
Harland of Sutton Hall	1808	Harland	extinct 1810	
Harmar-Nicholls	1960	Harmar-Nicholls, Nicholls	extinct 2000	
Harmood-Banner of Liverpool	1924	Harmood-Banner	extinct 1990	
Harmsworth of Freshwater Grove	1922	Harmsworth	dormant	second Baronet died 1977
Harmsworth of Horsey	1910	Harmsworth	extant	first Baronet created Viscount Rothermere in 1919
Harmsworth of Moray Lodge	1918	Harmsworth	extinct 1980	
Harmsworth of Elmwood and Sutton Place	1904	Harmsworth	extinct 1922	first Baronet created Viscount Northcliffe in 1918
Harnage of Belswardyne	1821	Harnage	extinct 1888	
Harris of Chepping Wycombe	1953	Harris	extinct 1956	
Harris of Bethnal Green	1932	Harris	extant	
Harrison of Bugbrooke	1961	Harrison	extant	
Harrison of Eaglescliffe	1922	Harrison	extant	
Harrison of Le Court	1917	Harrison	extinct 1934	
Hart of Kilmoriaty	1893	Hart	extinct 1970	
Hartwell of Dale Hall	1805	Hartwell	extant	
Harty of Prospect House	1831	Harty	extinct 1939	Lord Mayor of Dublin
Harvey of Crown Point	1868	Harvey	extant	fourth Baronet had already been created Baron Harvey of Tasburgh (1954) when he succeeded to the Baronetcy in 1954
Harvey of Langley Park	1868	Harvey	extinct 1931	
Harvey of Threadneedlestreet	1933	Harvey	extant	
Harvie-Watt of Bathgate	1945	Harvie-Watt	extant	
Hastings, later Abney-Hastings of Willesley Hall	1806	Hastings, Abney-Hastings	extinct 1858	
Hatch of Portland Place	1908	Hatch	extinct 1927	
Havelock-Allan of Lucknow	1858	Havelock-Allan	extant	
Hawkey of Woodford	1945	Hawkey	extinct 1975	
Hawkins-Whitshed of Killincarrick and Jobstown	1834	Hawkins-Whitshed	extinct 1871	
Haworth of Dunham Massey	1911	Haworth	extant	
Hayter of South Hill Park	1858	Hayter	extinct 1917	second Baronet created Baron Haversham in 1906
Head of Rochester	1838	Head	extant	
Headlam of Holywell	1935	Headlam	extinct 1964	
Heath of Ashorne Hill	1904	Heath	extinct 1942	
Heathcoat-Amory of Knightshayes Court	1874	Heathcoat-Amory	extant	fourth Baronet created Viscount Amory in 1960, which title became extinct in 1981
Heaton of Mundarrah Towers	1912	Heaton, Henniker-Heaton	extant	
Henderson-Stewart of Callumshill	1957	Henderson-Stewart	extant	
Henderson of Buscot Lodge	1902	Henderson	extant	first Baronet created Baron Faringdon in 1916
Hennessy of Windlesham	1927	Hennessy	extant	first Baronet created Baron Windlesham in 1937
Henniker of Newton Hall	1813	Henniker	dormant	eighth Baronet died 1991 - under review
Henry of Cahore	1923	Henry	extant	
Henry of Campden House Court	1918	Henry	extinct 1931	
Henry of Parkwood	1911	Henry	extinct 1919	
Herbert of Boyton	1936	Herbert	extinct 1939	
Herbert of Llanarth	1907	Herbert	extinct 1933	first Baronet created Baron Treowen in 1917
Herbert of Wilton	1937	Herbert	extinct 1942	
Hermon-Hodge	1902	Hermon-Hodge	extinct 1999	first Baronet created Baron Wyfold in 1919
Herschel of Slough	1838	Herschel	extinct 1950	
Hervey-Bathurst of Clarendon Park	1818	Hervey-Bathurst	extant	
Hewett of Chesterfield Street	1883	Hewett	extinct 1891	
Hewett of Netherseale	1813	Hewett	extant	
Hewitt of Barnsley	1921	Hewitt	extant	
Heygate of Southend	1831	Heygate	extant	
Heywood of Claremont	1838	Heywood	extant	
Hibbert of Chorley	1919	Hibbert	extinct 1927	
Hicking of Southwell	1917	Hicking	extinct 1947	first Baronet was given a new patent in 1920; this creation is still extant
Hicking of Southwell	1920	Hicking, North	extant	first Baronet had already been created a Baronet in 1917, which title became extinct in 1947
Hickman of Wightwick	1903	Hickman	extant	
Hill of Bradford	1917	Hill	extant	
Hill of Green Place	1919	Hill	extinct 1944	
Hill-Wood of Moorfield	1921	Hill-Wood	extant	
Hillary of Danbury Place and Rigg House	1805	Hillary	extinct 1854	
Hills of Hills Court	1939	Hills	extinct 1955	
Hindley of Meads	1927	Hindley	extinct 1963	first Baronet created Viscount Hyndley in 1948
Hingley of Hatherton Lodge	1893	Hingley	extinct 1918	
Hirst of Witton	1925	Hirst	extinct 1943	first Baronet created Baron Hirst in 1934
Hislop of Tothill	1813	Hislop	extinct 1843	
Hoare of Fleet Street	1962	Hoare	extinct 1986	Lord Mayor of London
Hoare of Sidestrand Hall, Cliff House and Heath House	1899	Hoare	extinct 1959	second Baronet created Viscount Templewood in 1944
Hobart of Langdown	1914	Hobart	extant	
Hobhouse of Chantry House and Westbury College	1812	Hobhouse	extant	second Baronet created Baron Broughton in 1859, which title became extinct in 1869
Hodge of Chipstead	1921	Hodge	extant	
Hogg of Upper Grosvenor Street	1846	Hogg	extant	second Baronet created Baron Magheramorne in 1887, which title became extinct in 1957; unproven (eighth Baronet died 2001) - under review
Holcroft of Eaton Mascott	1921	Holcroft	extant	
Holcroft of The Shrubbery	1905	Holcroft	extinct 1917	
Holden of Oakworth House	1893	Holden	extant	second Baronet created Baron Holden in 1908, which title became extinct in 1951
Holden of The Firs	1919	Holden	extant	
Holden of The Grange	1909	Holden	extinct 1965	
Holder of Pitmaston	1898	Holder	extant	
Holderness of Tadworth	1920	Holderness	extant	
Holland of Broughton	1907	Holland	extinct 1950	first Baronet created Baron Rotherham in 1910
Holland of Sandlebridge and Lower Brook Street	1853	Holland, Holland-Hibbert	extant	second Baronet created Viscount Knutsford in 1895
Holland of Westwell Manor	1917	Holland	extinct 1997	
Hollins of Greyfriars	1907	Hollins	extinct 1963	
Holt of Cheetham	1916	Holt	extinct 1968	
Holt of Liverpool	1935	Holt	extinct 1941	
Holyoake-Goodricke of Studley Castle	1835	Holyoake-Goodricke	extinct 1888	
Homan of Dunlum	1801	Homan	extinct 1852	
Home of Well Manor Farm	1813	Home	extinct 1853	
Honyman of Armadale and Greenway	1804	Honyman	extinct 1911	
Hood of Wimbledon	1922	Hood	dormant	second Baronet died 2005
Hooper of Tenterden	1962	Hooper	extinct 1987	
Hope of Kinnettles	1932	Hope	dormant	second Baronet died 1979
Hopkins of St Pancras	1929	Hopkins	extinct 1946	
Horder of Ashford	1923	Horder	extinct 1997	first Baronet created Baron Horder in 1933
Horlick of Stubbings Manor	1914	Horlick	extant	
Hornby of Brookhouse	1899	Hornby	extinct 1971	
Horne of Shackleford	1929	Horne	extant	
Horsbrugh-Porter of Merrion Square	1902	Horsbrugh-Porter	extant	
Horsfall of Hatfield	1909	Horsfall	extant	
Hoste of the Navy	1814	Hoste	extinct 1915	
Houldsworth of Reddish and Coodham	1887	Houldsworth	extant	
Houldsworth of Heckmondwicke	1956	Houldsworth	extinct 1990	
Houston, later Houston-Boswall of Blackadder	1836	Houston, Houston-Boswall	extant	
Houston of West Toxteth	1922	Houston	extinct 1926	
Howard of Bushey Park	1838	Howard	extinct 1873	
Howard of Great Rissington	1955	Howard	extant	Lord Mayor of London
Hoyle of Banney Royd	1922	Hoyle	extinct 1939	
Hozier of Newlands	1890	Hozier	extinct 1929	first Baronet created Baron Newlands in 1898
Hudson-Kinahan of Glenville, Wyckham and Marrion Square	1887	Hudson-Kinahan	extinct 1949	
Hudson of North Hackney	1942	Hudson	extinct 1956	
Hughes-Hunter of Plâs Gôch	1906	Hughes-Hunter	extinct 1951	
Hughes-Morgan of Manascin	1925	Hughes-Morgan	extant	
Hughes of Denford	1942	Hughes	extinct 1958	
Hulton of Downside	1921	Hulton	extinct 1925	
Hulton of Hulton Park	1905	Hulton	extinct 1993	
Hume-Williams of Ewhurst	1922	Hume-Williams	extinct 1980	
Humphery of Penton Lodge	1868	Humphery	extinct 1909	
Hunt of Cromwell Road	1892	Hunt	extinct 1904	
Hunter of London	1812	Hunter	extinct 1924	Lord Mayor of London
Huntington-Whiteley of Grimley	1918	Huntington-Whiteley	extant	
Huntington of The Clock House	1906	Huntington	extinct 1928	
Hutchison of Hardiston	1923	Hutchison	extinct 1972	Lord Provost of Edinburgh
Hutchison of Rossie	1956	Hutchison	extant	unproven (second Baronet died 1998)
Hutchison of Thurle	1939	Hutchison	extant	President of the Royal College of Physicians
Hyde of Birmingham	1922	Hyde	extinct 1942	
