= Thomas Horder =

Thomas Horder may refer to:

- Thomas Horder, 1st Baron Horder (1871–1955)
- Thomas Mervyn Horder, 2nd Baron Horder (1910–1997)
