= Nuneham Courtenay =

Village in Oxfordshire, England

Coordinates: 51.689°N 01.201°W

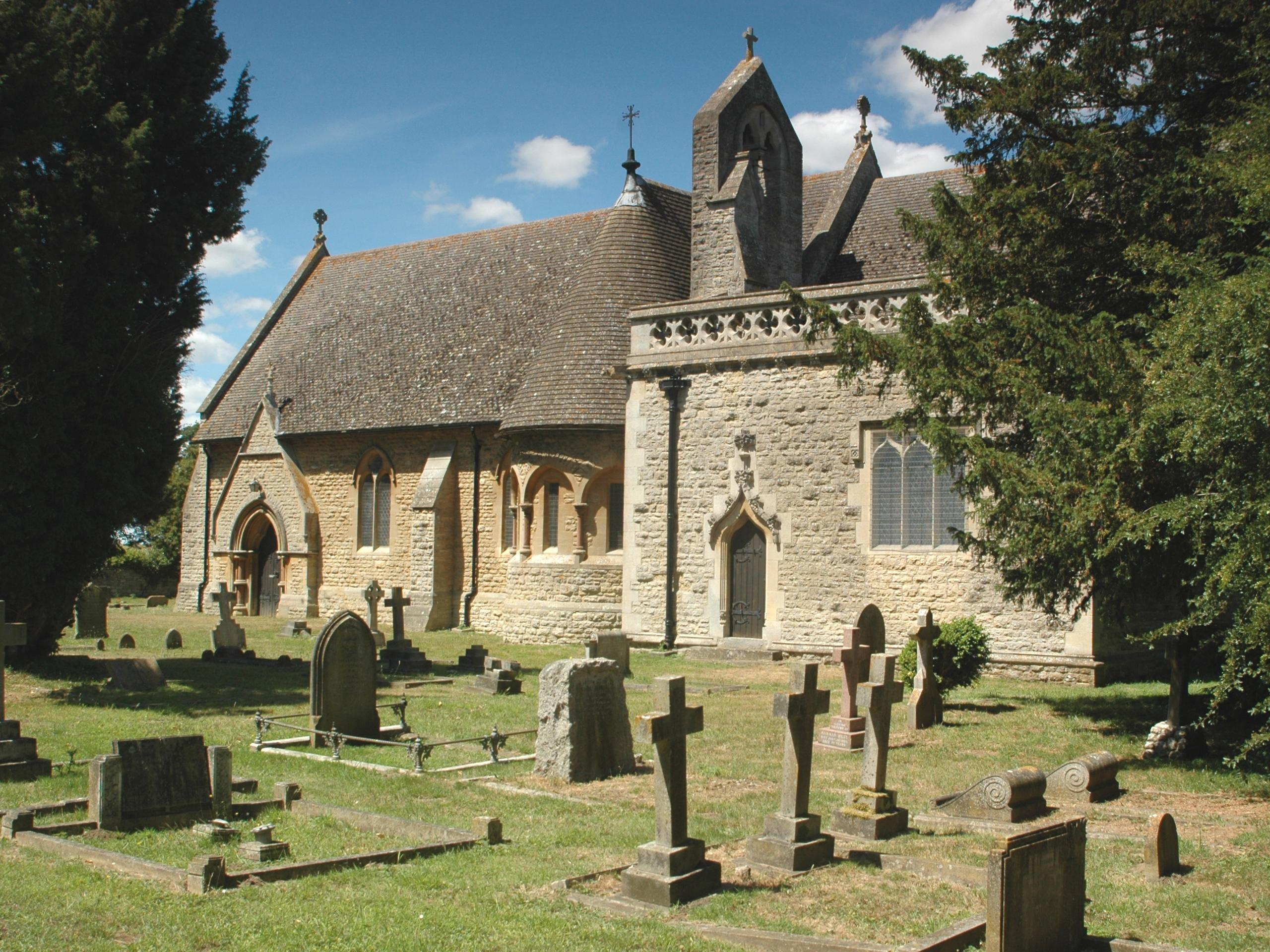
- All Saints' parish church, built 1872–74

- Location within Oxfordshire
- Area: 8.57 km^{2} (3.31 sq mi)
- Population: 200 (2011 census)
  - Density: 23/km^{2} (60/sq mi)
- OS grid reference: SU5699
- Civil parish: Nuneham Courtenay
- District: South Oxfordshire
- Shire county: Oxfordshire
- Region: South East
- Country: England
- Sovereign state: United Kingdom
- Post town: Oxford
- Postcode district: OX44
- Dialling code: 01865
- Police: Thames Valley
- Fire: Oxfordshire
- Ambulance: South Central
- UK Parliament: Didcot and Wantage
- Website: Nuneham Courtenay Parish Council

Nuneham Courtenay is a village and civil parish about 5 miles (8 km) SSE of Oxford. It occupies several miles close to the east bank of the River Thames.

== Geography ==
The parish is bounded to the west by the River Thames and on other sides by field boundaries. The 2011 census recorded the parish's population as 200. The parish is on a light escarpment running north-east to south-west. Its highest point is a small knoll 100 metres above sea level, about 500 metres from the village (in Harcourt Arboretum, part of a larger woodland). Between these points is Windmill Hill where no evidence of a windmill survives. The minimum elevation is 52m to 53m along the Thames which follows the line of the central eminent land. Most of the Bluebell Wood nature reserve is on the eastern slopes, across Marsh Baldon's straight and touching boundary. The parish covers about 2 km north to the same south-west of the point shown and just over 1% of South Oxfordshire's 67.85 km^{2}. Its population was 0.15% of the district's total of 134,257. The Oxford Green Belt Way passes through the parish.

== History ==
The toponym was Newenham from the 11th century on, until it was changed to "Nuneham" in 1764.

=== Roman ===
Just southeast of Lower Farm, about 1 1/2 miles (2.4 km) northwest of the present Nuneham Courtenay village, is the site of a former Romano-British pottery kiln. The kiln was about 1 1/2 miles (2.4 km) west of the Roman road that linked the Roman towns at Dorchester on Thames and Alchester. It began production about AD 100, producing a wide range of fine wares in the 2nd century and increased its product range in the 3rd century. It then declined, and in about the middle of the 4th century it ceased production. The remains of the kiln were discovered in 1991 during excavations to lay a new water main for Thames Water.

=== Newenham—Nuneham Manor ===
Some time between the Norman Conquest of England in 1066 and the completion of the Domesday Book in 1086 William the Conqueror granted the manor of Newenham to one of his Normans barons, Richard de Courcy. It remained in his family until the death of his great-grandson, William (III) de Courcy in 1176. It then passed from William de Courcy's widow Gundreda via her female heirs to Baldwin de Redvers, 7th Earl of Devon. Baldwin died without an heir, so Newenham again passed to a female "overlord", Isabella de Fortibus, Countess of Devon. She too died without an heir, but in 1310 King Edward II granted Newenham to Hugh de Courtenay, 9th Earl of Devon. Newenham remained in the Courtenay family until the latter part of the 14th century, when Sir Peter de Courtenay, son of Hugh de Courtenay, 10th Earl of Devon sold his inheritance of the estate to Sir Hugh Segrave.

Under the terms of the sale Margaret de Bohun, 2nd Countess of Devon retained the use of Newenham Courtenay for life. However, Sir Hugh Segrave died in 1386 and the Countess outlived him, so upon her death in 1391 the manor passed to Segrave's aunt's grandson, Sir John Drayton, who was Member of Parliament for Oxfordshire (October 1404) and Gloucestershire (1410). Sir John died in 1417 leaving the manor to his widow Isabel, younger daughter of Sir Maurice Russell (died 1416) of Dyrham, Gloucestershire and Kingston Russell, Dorset. Isabel then married, her 4th husband, Stephen Hatfield. After some legal problems concerning the title to the manor, in 1425 Isabel and Hatfield sold the reversion of the manor, reserving a life interest to themselves, to Thomas Chaucer (c. 1367–1434 or 1435), son of the poet Geoffrey Chaucer and Speaker of the House of Commons on five occasions between 1407 and 1421. Upon Isabel's death in 1437, Newenham Courtenay passed to Alice Chaucer, daughter of Thomas Chaucer. Alice was married to William de la Pole, 1st Duke of Suffolk. The manor remained in the de la Pole family until 1502, when Edmund de la Pole, 3rd Duke of Suffolk was outlawed and forfeited his lands for allegedly plotting a Yorkist rebellion against Henry VII.

In 1514 Henry VIII made his brother-in-law Charles Brandon Duke of Suffolk, and granted him the forfeited de la Pole estates. In 1528 Brandon conveyed Newenham Courtenay to Cardinal Wolsey, but the following year King Henry VIII deposed Wolsey. The manor was administered by royal stewards until 1544, when it was bought by John Pollard. Pollard lived at Newenham Courtenay until his death in 1557. He left the use of the manor to his widow Mary, with the estate to pass to two of his male relatives upon her death. Dame Mary, however, remarried in 1561 and lived to be over 100, outliving the heirs whom Pollard had appointed. She eventually died in 1606 and the estate passed to a younger John Pollard. John transferred Newenham Courtenay to his son Lewis, but both men were in debt and in 1634 Lewis sold the estate to the wealthy lawyer Hugh Audley.

In 1640, Audley sold Newenham Courtenay to Robert Wright, Bishop of Lichfield and Coventry. Wright supported Archbishop Laud, for which Parliament imprisoned him. He died in 1643 and his son Calvert inherited Newenham Courtenay. Calvert wasted his father's fortune, sold Newenham Courtenay in 1653, was imprisoned as a debtor, and died in the King's Bench Prison in Southwark in 1666. Calvert Wright's buyer was Sir John Robinson, 1st Baronet, of London, a City of London businessman who reported that it cost him more to clear the debts of Newenham Courtenay than to buy the estate. Robinson left the estate to his two daughters, who in 1710 sold it to Sir Simon Harcourt of Stanton Harcourt. Sir Simon was created Viscount Harcourt in 1721 and died in 1727. He was succeeded by his grandson Simon Harcourt, 2nd Viscount Harcourt, who was created 1st Earl Harcourt in 1749. Upon the death of William Harcourt, 3rd Earl Harcourt in 1830 the earldom became extinct, and the estate, now called Nuneham Courtenay, passed to the first Earl's nephew Edward Venables-Vernon, Archbishop of York, who then changed his name to Venables-Vernon-Harcourt. Manorial rights in England were largely abated in the 19th and 20th centuries. The estate remained in the family until 1948, when William Edward Harcourt, 2nd Viscount Harcourt (1908–1979) sold what remained of the manor to the University of Oxford.

==== Nuneham House and Park ====
The rectory and manor house used to accompany a small village with a medieval parish church standing on the most sudden part of the village's river bluff, all with a westward view over the River Thames. The manor house may have dated from the 16th century. The 1st Earl demolished the house, medieval church, and 'tumble-down clay-built' cottages of the village, and built a new parish church with an entirely new Nuneham Courtenay village almost 1 mile (1.6 km) north east to make way for his planned English style landscape park and new Nuneham House. The privately owned, two-storey Old Rectory was built in 1759 on the northern boundary, by the first Earl. It was made a Grade II listed building in 1963 as part of the "Nuneham Courtney Park and Garden".

==== New village ====
The new village comprised two identical rows of brick-built semi-detached cottages, each of a single main storey plus an attic floor with dormer windows. The two identical rows face each other across the main road from Oxford to Reading and Henley-on-Thames, which had been made a turnpike in 1736. (It has been classified the A4074 since the 20th century.) As the village population grew, additional cottages were added in similar styles early in the 19th century and again early in the 20th century. The old village had a village green. The new village has none, but was built to a spacious plan with gardens for every cottage and verges between them and the main road.

In the 1760s the Irish writer, poet and playwright Oliver Goldsmith witnessed the demolition of a medieval village and destruction of its farms to clear land to become a wealthy man's garden. His poem The Deserted Village, published in 1770, expresses a fear that the destruction of villages and the conversion of land from productive agriculture to ornamental landscape gardens would ruin the peasantry. The Deserted Village gave the demolished medieval village the pseudonym "Sweet Auburn" and Goldsmith did not disclose the real village on which he based it. He did, however, indicate it was about 50 miles (80 km) from London and it is widely believed to have been Nuneham Courtenay.

==== New Nuneham House ====
The 'new' Nuneham House was designed by the architect Stiff Leadbetter in 1756. The design was changed and enlarged twice during construction, so that the house when completed in 1764 was far from the compact Palladian villa designed eight years earlier. The Poet Laureate William Whitehead was a visitor, and it was he who coined the change of spelling from "Newenham" to "Nuneham" in 1764. The Archbishop of York commissioned the architect Robert Smirke to make unaesthetic but functional extensions to the house in the 1830s. Further alterations to the house were made in 1904.

==== Gardens ====
The design of the original landscape garden park owed much to the poet and gardener the Rev. William Mason, who designed its formal flower garden in 1771. George Simon Harcourt, 2nd Earl Harcourt commissioned the renowned Lancelot "Capability" Brown to make alterations to the landscape garden park in 1779, and the house in 1781. The works were completed in the autumn of 1782, shortly before Brown's death. William Whitehead's poem The Late Improvements at Nuneham celebrated Brown's work. Brown had planned a Gothic Revival tower folly for a prominent site overlooking the Thames. In 1787, however, the University of Oxford dismantled Carfax Conduit, which had been built in 1617 in the centre of Oxford. The 2nd Earl re-erected the Conduit building in his park instead of the proposed tower.

In the 1830s Edward Venables-Vernon-Harcourt, Archbishop of York, destroyed William Mason's formal flower garden and most of the landscape park's sculptures. He bought and added adjacent land in Marsh Baldon parish to extend the park eastwards as far as the Oxford–Dorchester main road. On this new land he had the artist W.S. Gilpin design a Doric entrance lodge in the 1830s. The Archbishop had a pinetum botanical garden planted in 1835. In 1963 the arboretum became Harcourt Arboretum, part of the tree and plant collection of the University of Oxford Botanic Garden. It includes 10 acres (4 ha) of woodland and a 37-acre (15 ha) wildflower meadow.

== Parish Churches ==
=== Abingdon Abbey ===
Abingdon Abbey may have had a Saxon parish church in Newenham. If so, it was destroyed in the Danish invasions of the 10th century. There was then a parish church of All Saints that served the village from the Middle Ages until the 1760s, but little information about it survives. It was demolished in 1764 to make way for Earl Harcourt's landscaping plan (see above). Remains of two windows of the old church and one of the tombs were moved to Baldon House at nearby Marsh Baldon, where the windows were used to create a folly. The Earl removed monuments from both the churchyard and the church, demolished the church building and sold its ring of five bells. The English Baroque style monument to Anthony Pollard (died 1577) and Philippa Pollard (died 1606) was salvaged from the medieval church, and is now displayed in an open-fronted shelter outside the 'new' 1764 church, which is now a redundant church.

=== Old All Saints Church − 1764 ===
Earl Harcourt had the next All Saints parish church, the Old All Saints Church, built in 1764 about 20 feet (6 m) away from the medieval one's site. The Earl was an amateur architect and designed the church himself in the Neoclassical Greek Revival style, aided by the Neoclassicist James "Athenian" Stuart. It is a domed Palladian style temple. It is conventionally oriented, with its entrance on the west facade and altar in the east end, but also has a doorless Ionic portico on its north side overlooking the River Thames. The church is positioned on a slight rise on the river bluff to maximise its effect in the landscape park design. The removal of the village to a new site put the 1764 church almost 1-mile (1.6 km) away by winding, partly wooded footpaths. Its austere Neoclassical Palladian design also became unpopular during the 19th-century Gothic Revival. A new church was completed in 1874, which left the 1764 church to become the Harcourt family chapel. In 1880 ornately carved Italian fittings were added to its austere interior. The Churches Conservation Trust now cares for the building.

=== New All Saints' Church − 1874 ===
In 1871 Edward Vernon Harcourt MP inherited Nuneham Courtenay. He had a new All Saints' Church built for the parish during 1872–74 that was closer to the relocated village. It was designed in the Early English Gothic Revival style by the architect C.C. Rolfe. All Saints' parish is now part of the Benefice of "Marsh Baldon St Peter and Toot Baldon St Lawrence with Nuneham Courtenay, The Baldons". In the 1970s the Old All Saints Church, Nuneham Courtenay, of classical design, was declared redundant.

== Transport ==
There are sporadic records of one or more locks on the River Thames at Nuneham. One called "Bunselock" was referred to in 1279. In the 16th century the river seems to have had three locks at Nuneham. A map of 1707 shows a flash lock on the channel past a small island opposite the appropriately named Lock Wood. In 1716 it was repaired at the expense of the first Viscount. By 1707 Nuneham Courtenay had a ferry linking it with Lower Radley across the river. This continued to operate after the 1st Viscount removed Nuneham Courtenay village (see above).

== Education ==
In 1809 the Countess Harcourt opened a school for the village, run by a schoolmistress and supervised by the vicar. In 1835 a new school building was completed and in 1849 the National Society for Promoting Religious Education gave a grant to develop the building. At the end of the 19th century it was noted amongst village schools for the high quality of its education. In 1925 it was reorganised as a junior school; known to be open in 1957 it closed later that century. It fed into Dorchester's school.

== Gallery ==
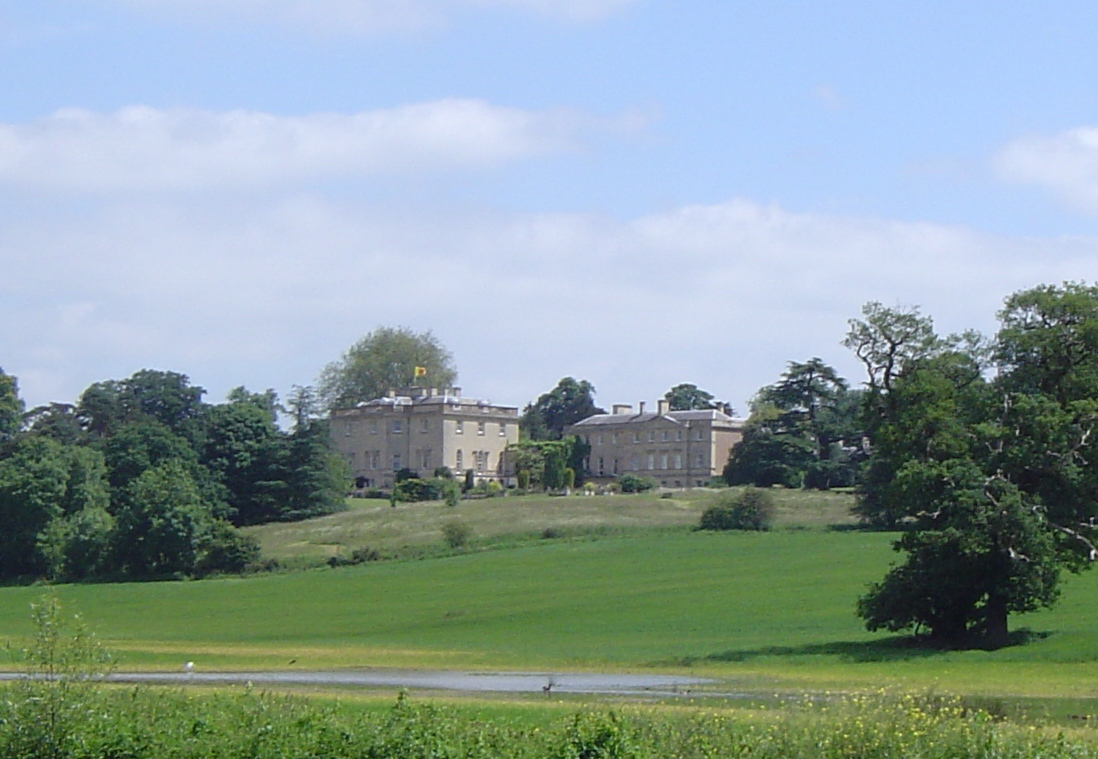
Nuneham House overlooking the Thames.

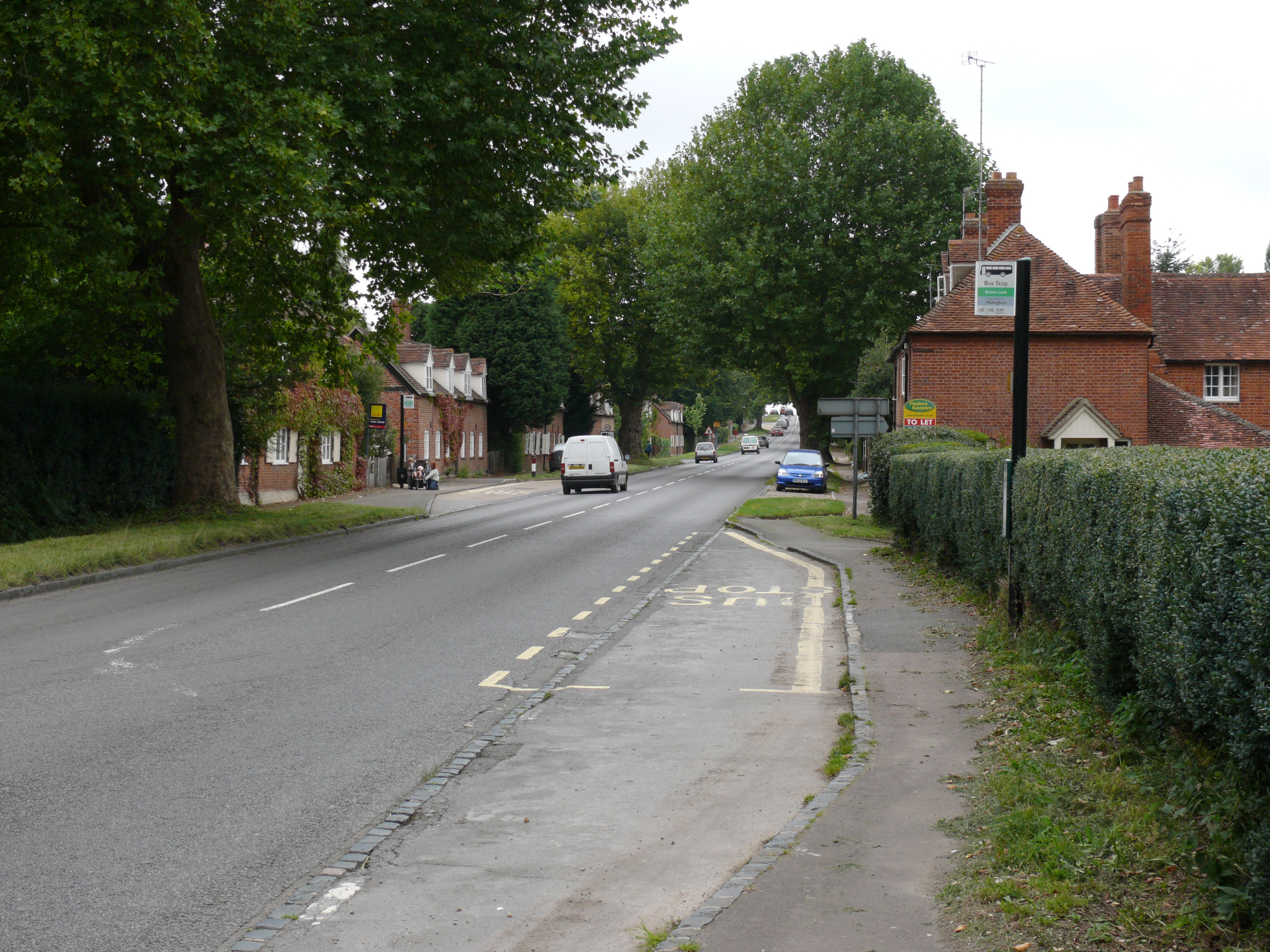
View northwest of the main road in Nuneham Courtenay village.

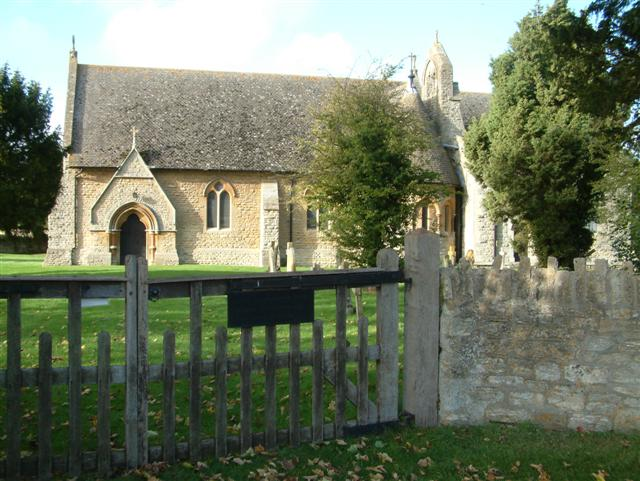
1874 'New' All Saints' Church, designed in the Early English Gothic Revival style.

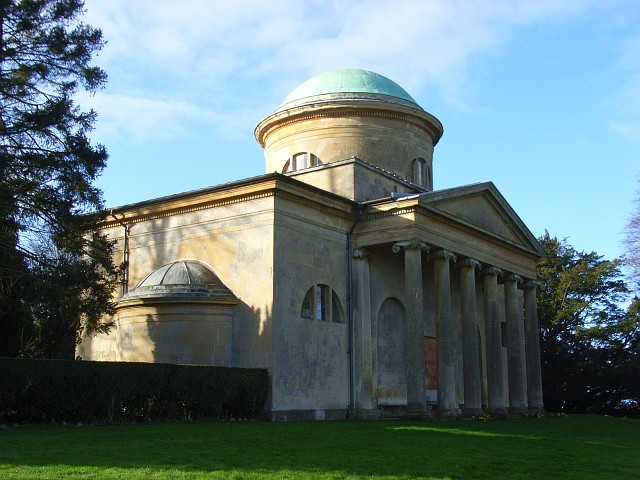
1764 'Old' All Saints Church, designed in the Palladian Greek Revival style. North facade with portico facing the River Thames. It is now redundant.

"A Nuneham pasture", 1860 painting by Edward Lear.

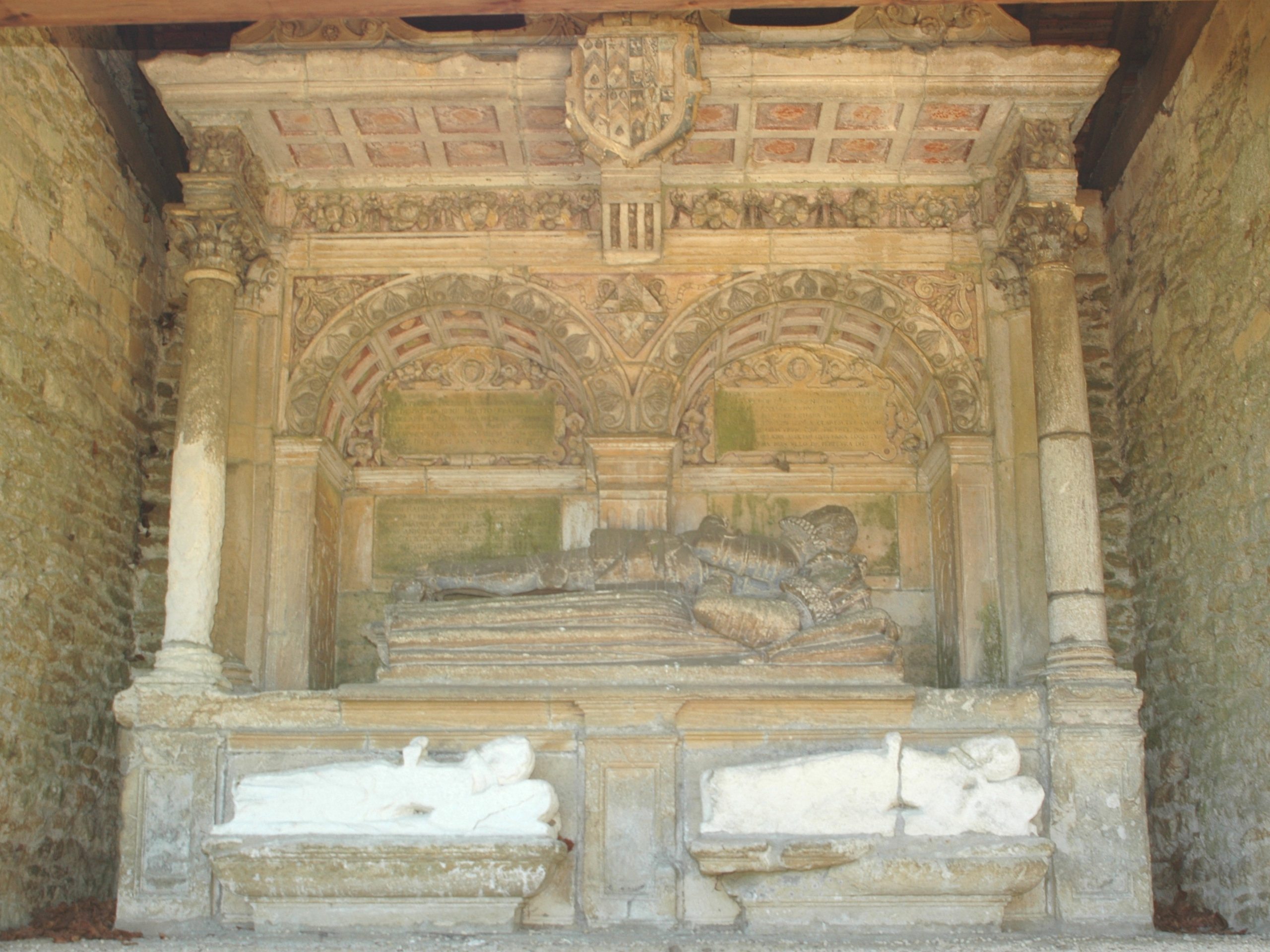
Monument to Anthony and Philippa Pollard, relocated from Abingdon Abbey.

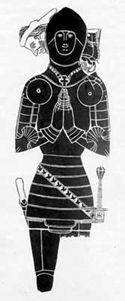
Memorial brass of Sir John Drayton (d. 1417), in Dorchester Abbey.
