= Old All Saints Church, Nuneham Courtenay =

Coordinates: 51.6805°N 1.2182°W

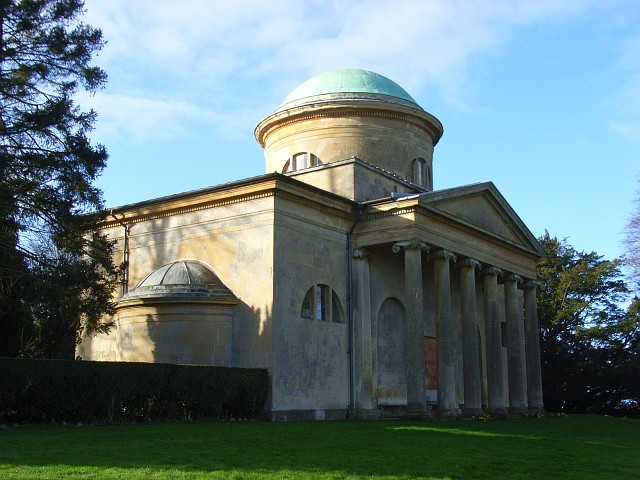
- Old All Saints Church, Nuneham Courtenay

- Location in Oxfordshire
- OS grid reference: SU542983
- Location: Nuneham Courtenay, Oxfordshire
- Country: England
- Denomination: Church of England
- Website: Churches Conservation Trust

History
- Founder: Simon Harcourt, 1st Earl Harcourt
- Dedication: All Saints

Architecture
- Functional status: Redundant
- Heritage designation: Grade II*
- Designated: 18 July 1963
- Architect: Simon Harcourt, 1st Earl Harcourt with James Stuart
- Architectural type: Church
- Style: Neoclassical
- Completed: 1764
- Construction cost: Over £800

Specifications
- Materials: Limestone ashlar Dome copper-covered

Old All Saints Church, or Harcourt Chapel, is a redundant Church of England church near the village of Nuneham Courtenay, Oxfordshire, England. It is recorded in the National Heritage List for England as a designated Grade II* listed building, and is under the care of the Churches Conservation Trust. The church is southwest of the village, in the grounds of Nuneham House overlooking the River Thames, some 6 miles (10 km) southeast of Oxford.

== History ==
This church is the second of three parish churches serving Nuneham Courtenay, each of which was dedicated to All Saints. The original church dated from the mediaeval period but was in a "ruinous state" by 1762. The mediaeval church was demolished by Simon Harcourt, 1st Earl Harcourt. The churchyard was destroyed and turned into a "pleasure ground" for the earl. This church was built in 1764. It was designed by the earl himself, with alterations to the design made by the architect James Stuart. Its estimated cost was over £800 (equivalent to £130,000 in 2025).

The church was sited conveniently for the earl and his family, but not for the parishioners living in the relocated village. In 1880 the third parish church was built, this one next to the new village, and the original church (the subject of this article) was converted for use as a private chapel for the family and refurnished. It was declared redundant on 8 May 1980, and was vested in the Churches Conservation Trust on 28 October 1981.

== Architecture ==
=== Exterior ===
The church is built of limestone ashlar and has a copper-covered dome. Its design is said to be based on one of the temples of Palmyra. The plan of the church is rectangular, with projections on each side. The principal front is the north, said to resemble the entrance front of Chiswick House. This has a projecting portico with six Ionic columns and a semicircular Diocletian window on each side of the portico. The portico is surmounted with an entablature consisting of a dentil cornice and a triangular pediment. The wall at the back of the portico contains a blind doorway and blind arches. The south front also has a pediment but this is enclosed. It has a central doorway with wrought iron gates. The east and west fronts are semicircular and are surmounted with half domes. The west front contains an entrance porch with Ionic columns. The main central dome contains four Diocletian windows. On the exterior of the east wall is a large memorial that was moved from the earlier church.

=== Interior ===
The interior has a central rotunda and two rectangular spaces. Around the rotunda are niches, and there is a small baptistry to its south. On the walls are plaster panels containing texts. Along the walls are elaborately carved stalls that were introduced in 1880. These are in 16th-century Italian style; their backs are decorated with panels divided by Corinthian columns. The wooden lectern dates from the 17th or 18th century. The font is gadrooned and dates from 1843; it has an Italian cover in Baroque style. Also in the church are two chests, four hatchments from the 19th century, three tapestries, relics from the funeral of Edward VII, and monuments to the Harcourt family.

== See also ==
- List of churches preserved by the Churches Conservation Trust in South East England
