= Bateson baronets of Killoquin (1789) =

The Bateson-Harvey, later Bateson baronetcy, of Killoquin in the County of Antrim, was created in the Baronetage of Ireland on 26 August 1789 for Robert Bateson-Harvey; with remainder to the heirs male of his father Richard Bateson. Born Robert Bateson, he assumed by Royal licence the additional surname of Harvey in 1788 (which was that of his maternal grandfather).

Bateson-Harvey died without legitimate issue and was succeeded according to the special remainder by his nephew, the 2nd Baronet. He was the son of Thomas Bateson, the son from his father's first marriage. He notably served as High Sheriff of Donegal in 1822. He was childless and on his death in 1870 the baronetcy became extinct.

== Bateson-Harvey, later Bateson baronets, of Killoquin (1789) ==
- Sir Robert Bateson-Harvey, 1st Baronet (died 1825)
- Sir Robert Bateson, 2nd Baronet (c. 1793–1870)

== Arms ==
Coat of arms of Bateson-Harvey of Killoquin
Crest 1st, A lion reguardant Proper, supporting an escutcheon Argent, charged with a bat's wing Sable (Harvey); 2nd, A bat's wing Sable (Bateson). Escutcheon Quarterly: 1st and 4th: Gules, on a bend engrailed Argent, three trefoils slipped Vert, all within a bordure wavy Or (Harvey); 2nd and 3rd: Argent, three bats' wings sable, on a chief Gules, a lion passant Or (Bateson).

== Extended family ==
Robert Harvey, illegitimate son of the 1st Baronet, was the father of Robert Harvey, who was created a baronet in 1868 (see Harvey baronets of Langley Park).
