= Harcourt Arboretum =

Arboretum in Oxfordshire, England

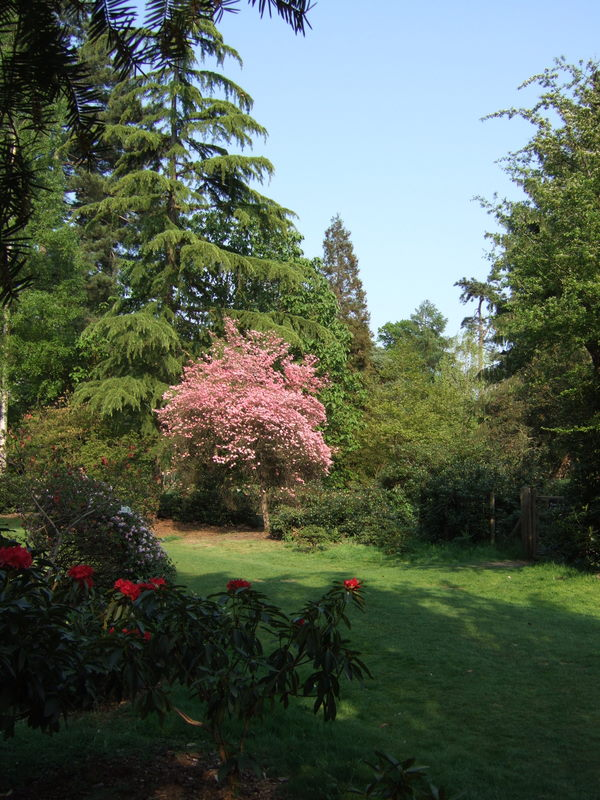
- Trees at the arboretum

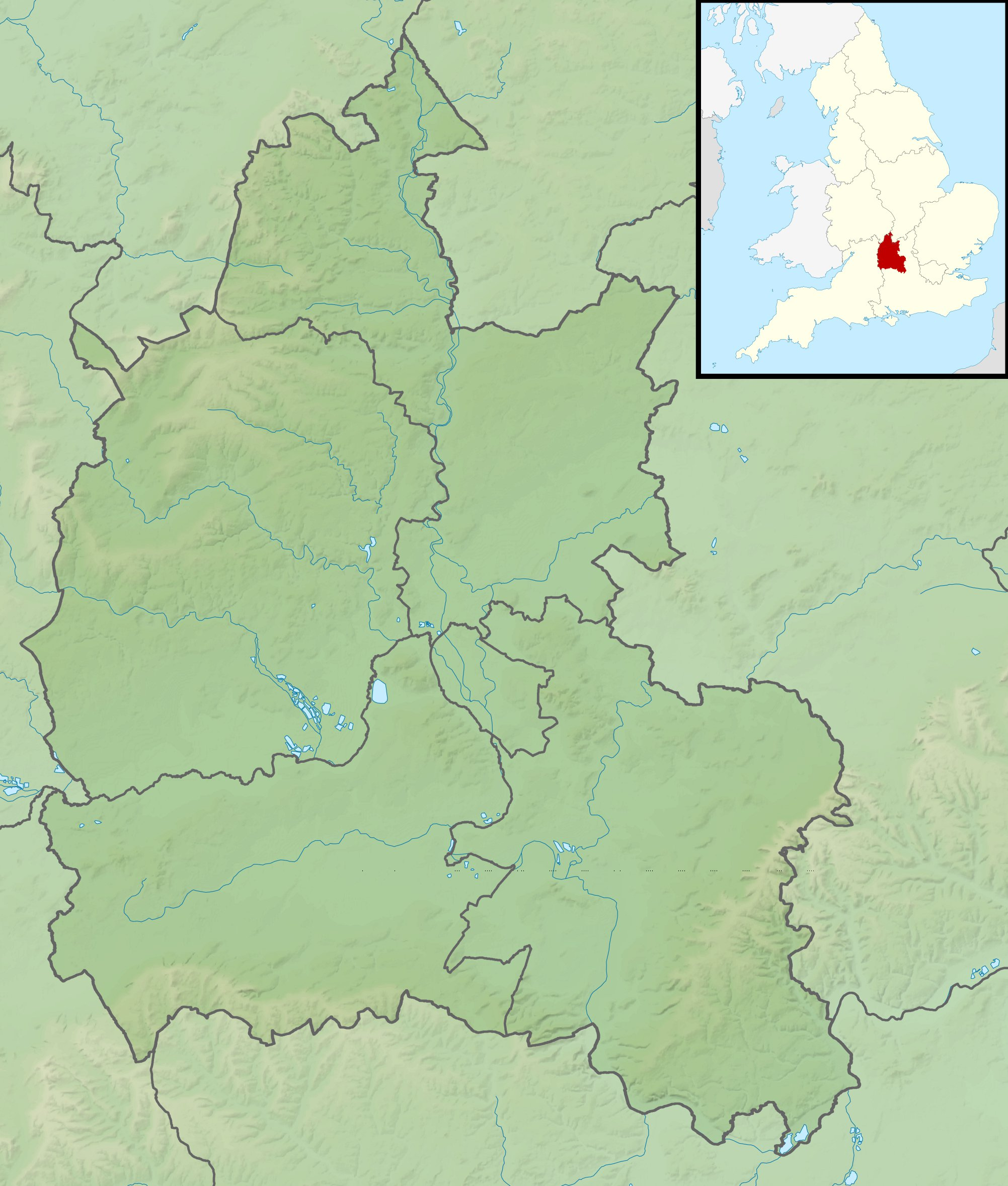
- Location within Oxfordshire
- Type: Arboretum
- Location: 6 miles (10 km) south of Oxford on the A4074
- Coordinates: 51°40′56″N 1°11′55″W
- Area: 150 acres (60 ha)
- Operator: University of Oxford 1963, acquired = 1947
- Status: Open throughout the year except 22 December to 3 January

Harcourt Arboretum is an arboretum owned and run by the University of Oxford. It is a satellite of the university's botanic garden in the city of Oxford, England. The arboretum itself is located six miles (ten kilometres) south of Oxford on the A4074 road, near the village of Nuneham Courtenay in Oxfordshire, and comprises some 150 acres (60 hectares). Professor Simon Hiscock is the Horti Praefectus (Director) of the botanic garden and arboretum.

The arboretum forms an integral part of the tree and plant collection of the University of Oxford Botanic Garden. It occupies part of what were the grounds of Nuneham House, about 1 1/2 miles (2.5 kilometres) from the house itself. It was designed to form an impressive entrance to the landscaped grounds of the house.

William Sawrey Gilpin (1762–1843), the artist and later landscape designer, laid out the pinetum, which forms the core of the arboretum. The trees are now mature, with giant redwoods and monkey-puzzle trees.

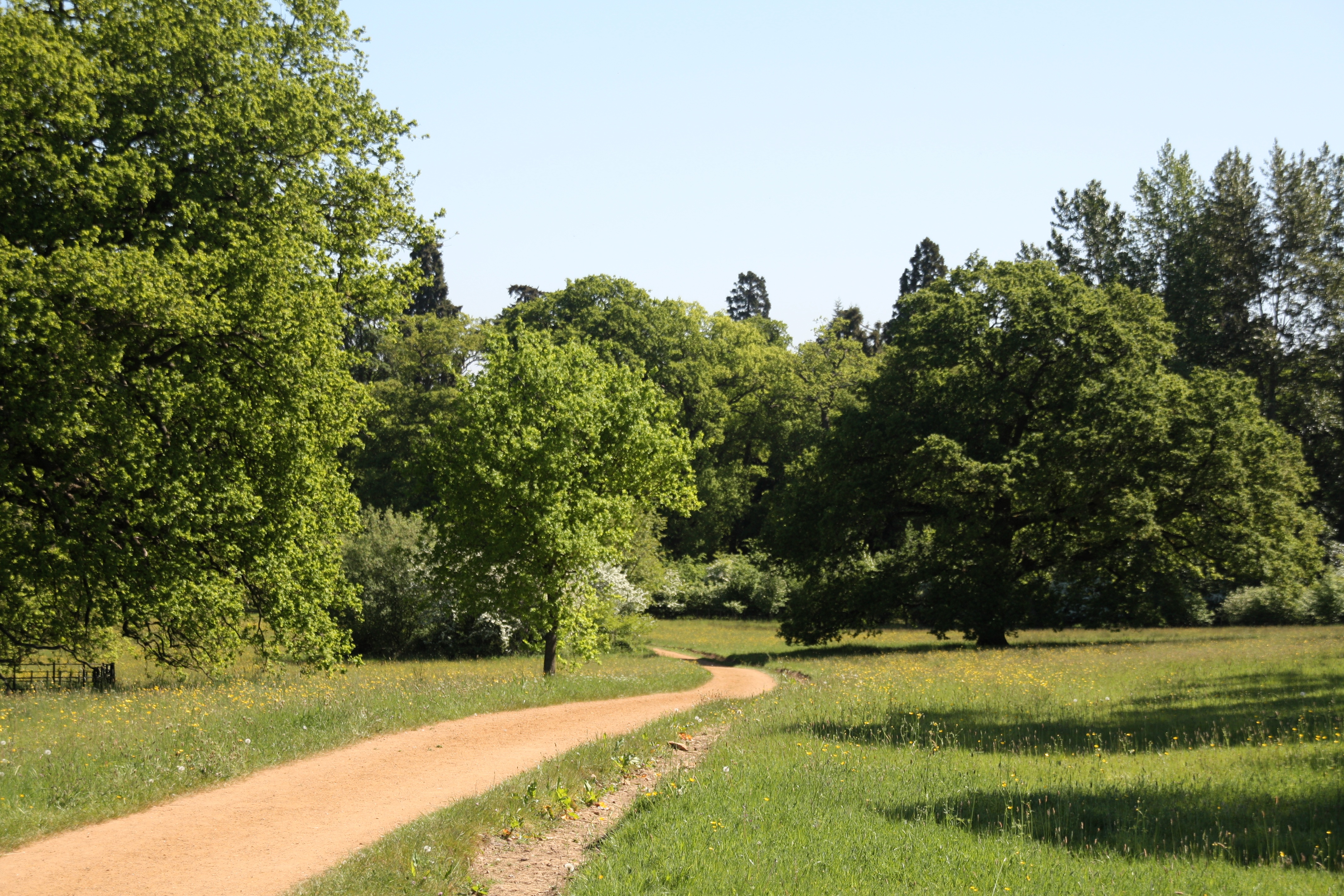
Meadow area with oak trees in the background.

The grounds include a 10-acre (4 ha) typical English woodland and a 37-acre (15 ha) summer flowering meadow. In late spring, the azaleas and rhododendrons are especially impressive. There are carpets of bluebells in the woods too. In the autumn, the leaf colours are brilliant, including Japanese maples. Peacocks roam the grounds, as they have since the establishment of the arboretum. In recent years, paths have been improved for accessibility.

The grounds are open to the public at a charge.
