= Harvey baronets =

Baronetcy in the Baronetage of the United Kingdom

There have been three baronetcies created for persons with the surname Harvey, all in the Baronetage of the United Kingdom.

The Harvey Baronetcy, of Langley Park in the County of Buckingham, was created in the Baronetage of the United Kingdom on 28 November 1868 for Robert Harvey, member of parliament for Buckinghamshire. He was the son of Robert Harvey, High Sheriff of Buckinghamshire in 1828, illegitimate son of Sir Robert Bateson-Harvey, 1st Baronet, of Killoquin (see Bateson baronets). The title became extinct on the death of the second baronet in 1931.

The Harvey Baronetcy, of Crown Point in the parish of Trowse in the County of Norfolk, was created in the Baronetage of the United Kingdom on 8 December 1868. When the 4th baronet succeeded to the title he had already been created 1st Baron Harvey of Tasburgh. As of 31 July 2012 no succession has been proven to the 5th baronet and the baronetcy is vacant.

The Harvey Baronetcy, of Threadneedle Street in the City of London, was created in the Baronetage of the United Kingdom on 19 January 1933 for Ernest Harvey, Director and Deputy Governor of the Bank of England. The third baronet, Charles Harvey, does not use his title.

== Harvey baronets, of Langley Park (1868) ==
Escutcheon of the Harvey baronets of Langley Park

- Sir Robert Bateson Harvey, 1st Baronet (1825–1887)
  - Sir Robert Grenville Harvey, 2nd Baronet (1856–1931) This baronetcy became extinct after his death.
    - Diana Blanche (b. 1897) married on 1921 Capt. Harold Harington Balfour, and had issue:
      - Ian (b. 1924)
    - Caroline Magdalen (Lady Oppenheimer) born in 1899.
  - Major Charles Bateson Harvey (b. 1859- d. 1900 killed in action), married on 1891 Catherine Maria, who died in 1929, daughter of Rev. the Hon. James Walter Lascelles.
    - Sylvia (b. 1899), married on 1918 Rawdon S. Payne, sometime Lieut. R.A.F. from whom she obtained a divorce in 1928 and had issue:
      - Desmond Ludlow (b. 1920)
      - Michael Shears (b. 1922)

== Harvey baronets, of Crown Point (1868) ==
- Sir Robert John Harvey, 1st Baronet (1817–1870)
- Sir Charles Harvey, 2nd Baronet (1849–1928)
- Sir Charles Robert Lambart Edward Harvey, 3rd Baronet (1871–1954)
- Sir Oliver Charles Harvey, 4th Baronet (1893–1968)
- Sir Peter Charles Oliver Harvey, 5th Baronet (died 2010)

This baronetcy is dormant.

On his succession, the 4th baronet had already been created 1st Baron Harvey of Tasburgh.

== Harvey baronets, of Threadneedle Street (1933) ==
- Sir Ernest Musgrave Harvey, 1st Baronet (1867–1955)
- Sir Richard Musgrave Harvey, 2nd Baronet (1898–1978)
- (Sir) Charles Richard Musgrave Harvey, 3rd Baronet (born 1937)

The heir apparent is the present holder's son Paul Richard Harvey (born 1971). There are no further heirs to the title.

== See also ==
- Bateson baronets
- Harvie-Watt baronets
- Hervey baronets
- Hervey-Bathurst baronets
