= Bateson baronets =

Set index for Shelley baronets

There have been two baronetcies created for persons with the surname Bateson, one in the Baronetage of Ireland and one in the Baronetage of the United Kingdom.

- Bateson baronets of Killoquin (1789), initially Bateson-Harvey baronets
- Bateson baronet of Belvoir Park (1818), later de Yarburgh-Bateson baronets: see Baron Deramore
