= Castle Hill, Englefield Green =

Mansion in Surrey, England

- Elvills
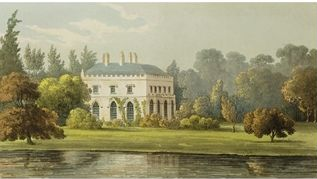
- Elvills, Englefield Green, Surrey

- Location within Surrey
- 51°26′13″N 0°34′38″W
- Location: Englefield Green
- OS grid reference: SU9900371870

History
- Built: 1758–1763

Site notes
- Area: Surrey
- Architect: Stiff Leadbetter

Listed Building – Grade II
- Official name: Castle Hill
- Designated: 24 October 1984
- Reference no.: 1028964

Listed Building – Grade II
- Official name: Castle Hill entrance gates
- Designated: 24 October 1984
- Reference no.: 1378027

Listed Building – Grade II
- Official name: Castle Hill bothy
- Designated: 24 October 1984
- Reference no.: 1028965

Listed Building – Grade II
- Official name: Castle Hill stable block
- Designated: 24 October 1984
- Reference no.: 1378026

Listed Building – Grade II
- Official name: Castle Hill dairy
- Designated: 5 June 1985
- Reference no.: 1028963

Castle Hill (originally known as Elvill's) is a large late-18th-century or early-19th-century Grade II listed mansion in Englefield Green, Surrey, England. The estate totaled 33 acres in 2012, it had previously stood at 108 acres at the time of its 1863 sale. It was designed by Stiff Leadbetter for Sir John Elwill, 4th Baronet and built between 1758 and 1763. The estate was bought by the banker George C. Raphael in the late 19th century.

It was purchased by the Ugland Marine Insurance Company in the 1990s. It is presently owned by a foreign royal family.

In addition to the main house, the entrance gates, bothy, stable block, and dairy are all individually Grade II listed.
