= Stiff Leadbetter =

British architect and builder

Stiff Leadbetter (c. 1705 – 18 August 1766) was a British architect and builder, one of the most successful architect–builders of the 1750s and 1760s, working for many leading aristocratic families.

== Career ==
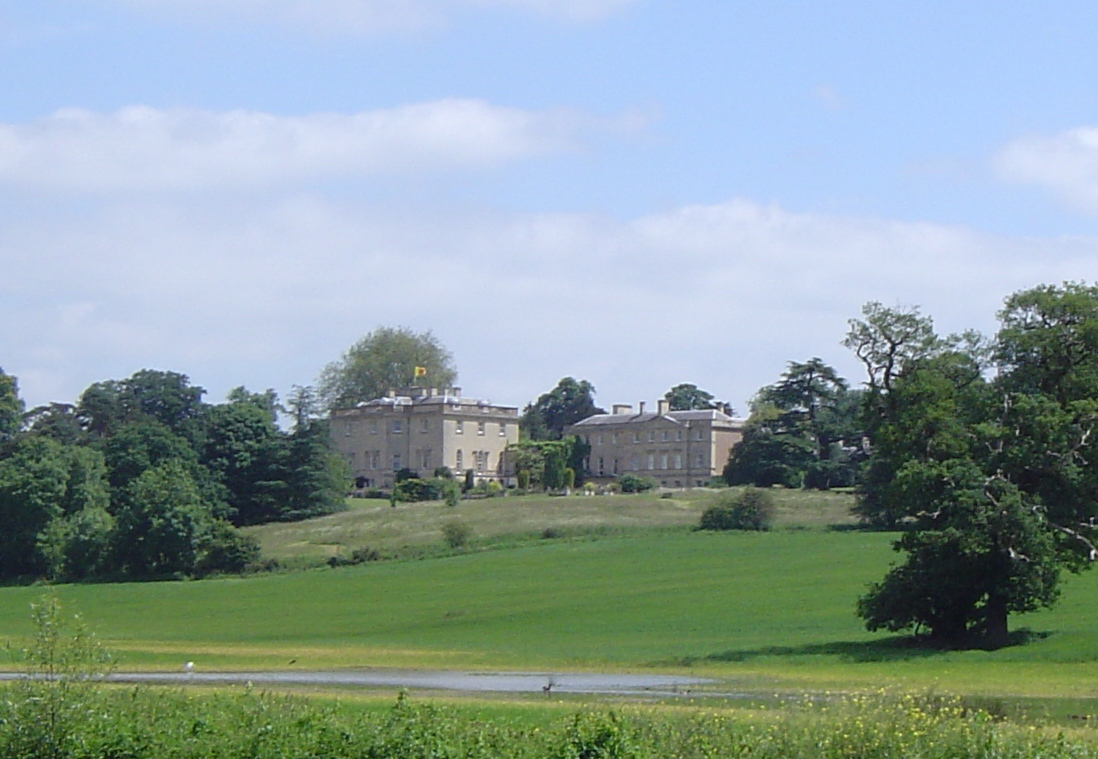
Nuneham House, Nuneham Courtenay, Oxfordshire. Designed by Leadbetter, 1757.

Leadbetter's career began when he was apprenticed as a carpenter in 1719, and he worked for the next decade or so as a journeyman carpenter. By 1731 he had settled in Eton, marrying Elizabeth Hill (born c.1709), daughter of a London timber merchant; and he worked as carpenter to Eton College from 1740. Leadbetter leased Eton College Wharf as his principal home and workshop from 1744. He was employed as a builder in his own right by the 1740s, and in the following two decades he worked both as a designer but primarily as a builder of many new country houses, hospitals and speculative urban development. In 1756 Leadbetter was appointed as Surveyor of the Fabric of St Paul's Cathedral, and through this position also gained many ecclesiastical commissions.

Many of his buildings were built within a close distance of Eton. As a builder he carried out the designs of other architects, notably Robert Adam and James Stuart.

Leadbetter's patron was Francis Godolphin, second earl of Godolphin, and through him, Leadbetter was introduced to and employed by the dukes of Portland, Marlborough, and Bedford, the countesses of Essex and Pomfret, Lord Foley, Admiral Boscawen, Sir John Elwill, and others.

John Hawks, the architect of Tryon Palace, the official residence of the governor of North Carolina, United States, trained under Leadbetter.

== Appraisal ==
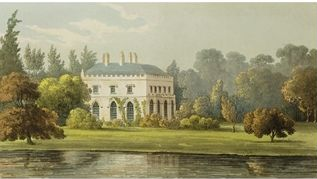
Elvills, Englefield Green, Surrey. Designed by Leadbetter, 1758–1763.

Leadbetter's work has been both praised and slightly damned by critics. Giles Worsley, who has written several articles about Leadbetter, stated

He was an innovative and possibly influential planner at a time when the design of the British country house was undergoing rapid change. His country houses, though plain in their interior and external detail, are imaginative, varied, and above all practical in their planning. Although he was not a leader in stylistic development, Elvills, Surrey (1758–63), was the first completely new house of the Georgian Gothic revival.

Langley Park, Nuneham House and Newton Park have been singled out as his best houses, with Newton Park described by Nikolaus Pevsner as "one of the finest country mansions of the 18th century in Somerset".

Less generous praise comes from other quarters, sometimes emphasising his earlier trade as a carpenter and ignoring his work as an architect: "a minor provincial carpenter and builder", "a second generation Palladian whose works lacked flair", a "competent but dull architect" and "a thorough but uninspired architect".

Leadbetter’s entry in Colvin's Biographical Dictionary of British Architects describes him as ‘a very competent architect who designed a number of handsome Georgian country houses that are essentially Palladian in character’

== Personal life ==
Leadbetter and his wife Elizabeth had five children in their short marriage, before Elizabeth died in 1737. Four of Leadbetter's children died before him.

== Projects (incomplete list) ==
- Bulstrode Park, Gerrards Cross, Buckinghamshire 1740s for William Bentinck, 2nd Duke of Portland – original house dating from 1676–1685 altered significantly by Leadbetter, later demolished in 1860 and replaced by present-day building.
- Ditchley, Charlbury, Oxfordshire 1763 Ionic rotunda in the grounds for Robert Lee, 4th Earl of Lichfield.
- Elvills (now Castle Hill), Englefield Green, Surrey 1758–1763 for Sir John Elwill, 4th Baronet.
- Fulham Palace 1764-1766 East Court, rebuilt in Gothic style for Bishop Terrick.
- Hatchlands Park, East Clandon, Surrey 1756-57 for Admiral Boscawen.
- Langley Park, Wexham, Buckinghamshire 1755-1758 for Charles Spencer, 3rd Duke of Marlborough.
- Newton Park, Newton St Loe, Somerset 1762-1765 for Joseph Langton.
- Nuneham House, Nuneham Courtenay, Oxfordshire 1757 for Simon Harcourt, 1st Earl Harcourt.
- Radcliffe Infirmary, Oxford 1759–1770 for the Radcliffe Trustees (benefaction of Dr. John Radcliffe).
- Shardeloes, Amersham, Buckinghamshire 1758–1766 for William Drake.
- Syon House, Hounslow 1763-1765 for Hugh Percy, 1st Duke of Northumberland.
- Taplow Court, Taplow, Buckinghamshire about 1743 for Murrough O'Brien, 1st Marquess of Thomond (5th Earl of Inchiquin).

== Bibliography ==
- D. B. W., 1940, "Stiff Leadbetter" Notes and Queries 178: 354–355
- Worsley, Giles, 2004, "Leadbetter, Stiff (c.1705–1766)" Oxford Dictionary of National Biography (ODNB) Oxford University Press
- Worsley, Giles, 1991, "Stiff but not dull" Country Life 25 July 1991
