= Oliver Harvey, 1st Baron Harvey of Tasburgh =

British civil servant and diplomat

Oliver Charles Harvey, 1st Baron Harvey of Tasburgh
- Born: 26 November 1893; Damhead, Lanarkshire, Scotland
- Died: 29 November 1968
- Occupations: a British civil servant and diplomat

Oliver Charles Harvey, 1st Baron Harvey of Tasburgh GCMG GCVO CB (26 November 1893 – 29 November 1968) was a British civil servant and diplomat.

== Life ==
Harvey was the son of Sir Charles Harvey, 2nd Baronet (1849-1928). He was educated at Malvern College. He was one of the Harvey family of baronets.

=== Diplomatic career ===
He joined the Diplomatic Service as a Third Secretary in 1920, after being admitted under open competition in September 1919. He advanced to Second Secretary from 15 December 1920, to First Secretary from 22 October 1926, and Counsellor from 21 January 1936. He was appointed a Commander of the Order of St Michael and St George in the 1937 Coronation Honours.

He was appointed a Companion of the Order of the Bath in the 1944 New Year Honours following his service as Principal Private Secretary to the Secretary of State, who had been Anthony Eden. He served as Deputy Under-Secretary of State for Foreign Affairs from 1946 to 1948 and as Ambassador to France from 1948 to 1954. He was appointed a Knight Commander of the Order of St Michael and St George in the 1946 Birthday Honours (and promoted to Knight Grand Cross of that Order in the 1948 New Year Honours) and Knight Grand Cross of the Royal Victorian Order in the 1950 Birthday Honours.

On 3 July 1954 he was raised to the peerage as Baron Harvey of Tasburgh, of Tasburgh in the County of Norfolk. Four months later he succeeded his half-brother as fourth Baronet, of Crown Point.

=== Personal life ===
Lord Harvey of Tasburgh married Maud Annora, daughter of Arthur Watkin Williams-Wynn, in 1920. He died in November 1968, aged 75, and was succeeded in his titles by his son Peter. Lady Harvey of Tasburgh died in 1970.

Lord Harvey and Maud Annora (née Williams Wynn) had issue:

- Peter Charles Oliver Harvey, 2nd Baron Harvey of Tasburgh (b. 28 Jan 1921, d. 18 Apr 2010)
- Hon. John Wynn Harvey (b. 4 Nov 1923, d. 21 Sep 1989)

=== Diaries ===
Lord Harvey's diaries are housed at the British Library. The diaries can be accessed through the British Library catalogue. Edited by his son John Harvey, they were published in two volumes as:

- The Diplomatic Diaries of Oliver Harvey 1937-1940 (Collins, 1970)
- The War Diaries of Oliver Harvey 1941-1945 (Collins, 1978)

== Notes ==
Diplomatic posts
| Preceded by Sir Horace Seymour | Principal Private Secretary to the Foreign Secretary; 1936–1939; 1941–1943 | Succeeded by Sir Ralph Stevenson |
| Preceded by Sir Ralph Stevenson | Principal Private Secretary to the Foreign Secretary; 1936–1939; 1941–1943 | Succeeded by Sir Pierson Dixon |
| Preceded by Duff Cooper | British Ambassador to France; 1948–1954 | Succeeded by Gladwyn Jebb |
Peerage of the United Kingdom
| New creation | Baron Harvey of Tasburgh; 1954–1968 | Succeeded by Peter Charles Oliver Harvey |
Baronetage of the United Kingdom
| Preceded by Charles Robert Lambart Edward Harvey | Baronet (of Crown Point); 1954–1968 | Succeeded by Peter Charles Oliver Harvey |
