= Harrison baronets =

Baronetcy in the Baronetage of the United Kingdom

There have been three baronetcies created for persons with the surname Harrison, all in the Baronetage of the United Kingdom. As of 2007 one of the creations is extinct while two are extant.

The Harrison Baronetcy, of Le Court in Greatham in the County of Southampton, was created in the Baronetage of the United Kingdom on 12 July 1917 for Heath Harrison. The title became extinct on his death in 1934.

The Harrison Baronetcy, of Egglescliffe in the County of Durham, was created in the Baronetage of the United Kingdom on 15 June 1922 for John Harrison. He served as Mayor of Stockton.

The Harrison Baronetcy, of Bugbrooke in the County of Northampton, was created in the Baronetage of the United Kingdom on 6 July 1961 for the Conservative politician Harwood Harrison. As of 2019 the title is held by his grandson, the third Baronet, who succeeded in 2019.

== Harrison baronets, of Le Court (1917) ==
Escutcheon of the Harrison baronets of Le Court

- Sir Heath Harrison, 1st Baronet (1857–1934) married on 1882 Mary Adelaide, daughter of the late William Howard, of Colchester.

== Harrison baronets, of Eaglescliffe (1922) ==
Escutcheon of the Harrison baronets of Eaglescliffe

- Sir John Harrison, 1st Baronet (1856–1936)
- Sir John Fowler Harrison, 2nd Baronet (1899–1947)
- Sir (John) Wyndham Harrison, 3rd Baronet (1933–1955)
- Sir (Robert) Colin Harrison, 4th Baronet (1938–2020)
- Sir John Wyndham Fowler Harrison, 5th Baronet (born 1972)

There is no heir to the baronetcy.

== Harrison baronets, of Bugbrooke (1961) ==
- Sir (James) Harwood Harrison, 1st Baronet (1907–1980)
- Sir Michael James Harwood Harrison, 2nd Baronet (1936–2019)
- Sir Edwin Michael Harwood Harrison, 3rd Baronet (born 1981)
