= Nuneham House =

Country house in Oxfordshire, England

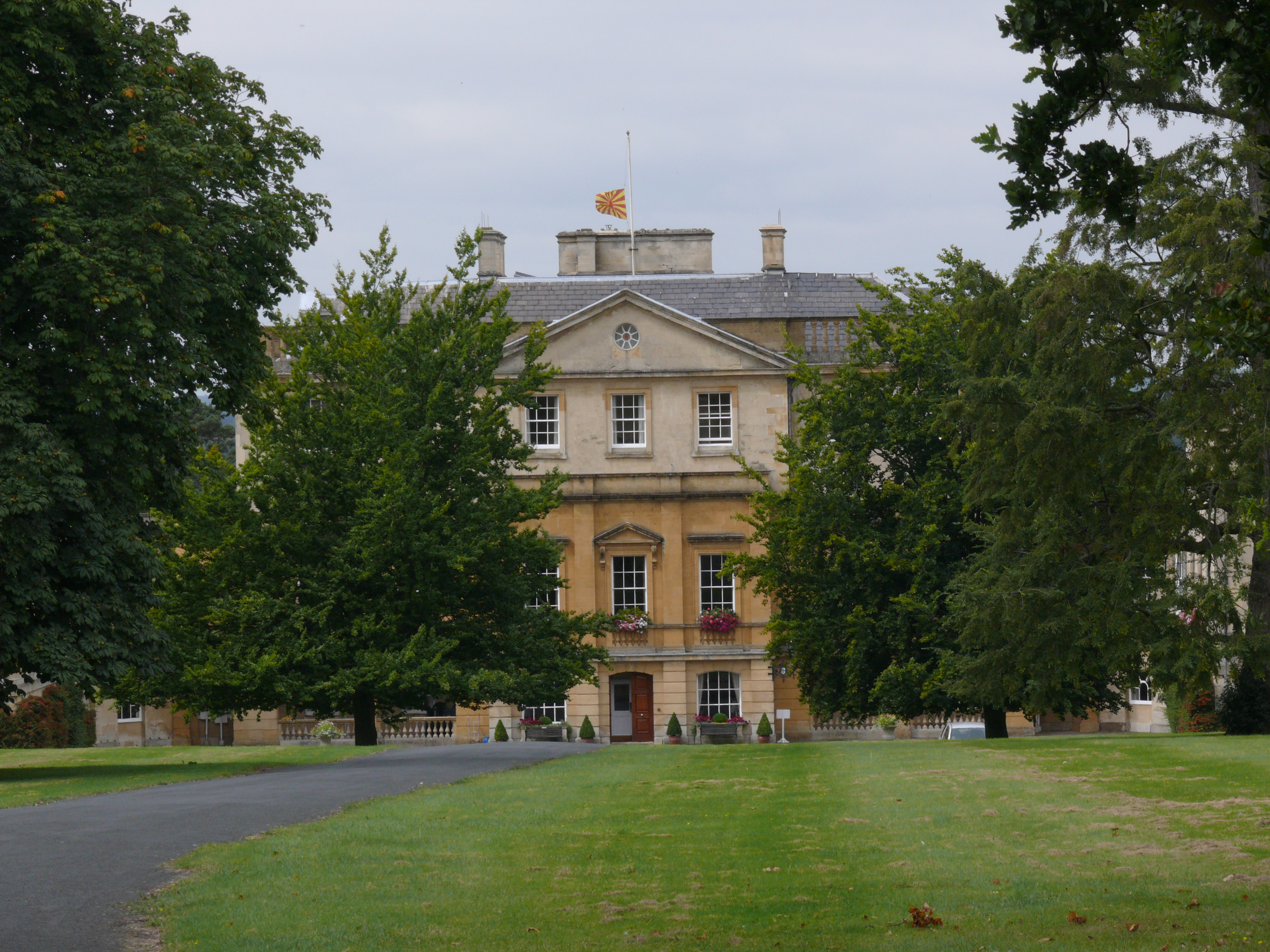
- Nuneham House in 2007
- Interactive map of the Nuneham House area

General information
- Type: Villa
- Architectural style: Palladian
- Classification: Grade II* listed building
- Location: Nuneham Courtenay, Oxfordshire, England, Nuneham Courtenay, England
- Coordinates: 51.6792°N 1.2196°W
- Current tenants: Brahma Kumaris World Spiritual University (retreat centre)
- Year built: 1756
- Renovated: 1781–2 (Henry Holland), c. 1904 (Lewis and Mary Harcourt)
- Renovation cost: £52,000 (c. 1904)
- Client: Simon Harcourt, 1st Earl Harcourt
- Owner: Oxford University

Technical details
- Grounds: 1000 acres (including parkland and farmland)

Design and construction
- Architect: Stiff Leadbetter
- Other designers: James Stuart (interiors), Lancelot "Capability" Brown (landscaped grounds), Henry Holland (alterations)
- Designations: Grade II* listed building, Grade I listed park and gardens
- Known for: Palladian architecture, Landscaped grounds by Capability Brown, Former RAF Nuneham Park

Renovating team
- Architect: Henry Holland

Nuneham House is an eighteenth century villa in the Palladian style, set in parkland at Nuneham Courtenay in Oxfordshire, England. It is currently owned by Oxford University and is used as a retreat centre by the Brahma Kumaris World Spiritual University. In September 2016 the house and a thousand acres of surrounding parkland and farmland, including the village of Nuneham Courtenay, were put up for sale in three separate lots for a total of £22 million.

== History ==
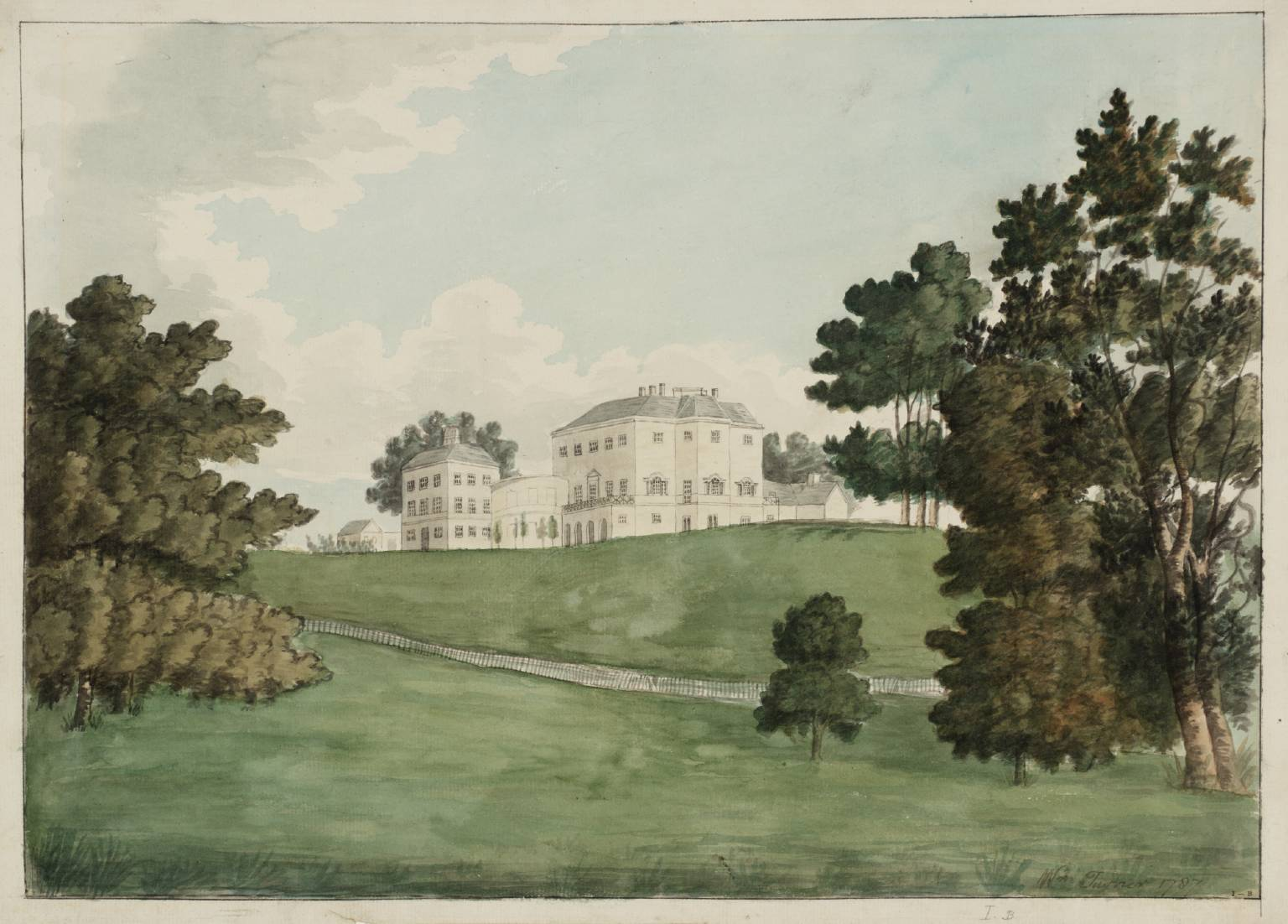
1787 illustration of Nuneham House by J. M. W. Turner

The house was built in 1756 on the site of an earlier property and surrounding village by Stiff Leadbetter for Simon Harcourt, 1st Earl Harcourt. Interiors were designed by James Stuart and Capability Brown designed the landscaped grounds. It is a Grade II* listed building.

Lord Harcourt demolished the original village of Nuneham Courtenay in the 1760s in order to create a landscaped park around his new villa, removing the existing village in its entirety, rebuilding it and diverting the main Oxford to London road (now the A4074). Oliver Goldsmith wrote of the demolition of the village and destruction of its farms to clear land to become this wealthy man's garden in his poem The Deserted Village. Published in 1770, it expresses a fear that the destruction of villages and the conversion of land from productive agriculture to ornamental landscape gardens would ruin the peasantry. Goldsmith gave his Deserted Village the pseudonym "Sweet Auburn", but did not disclose the real village to which it refers. However, he did indicate it was about 50 miles (80 km) from London and it is widely believed to have been Nuneham Courtenay.

The house was altered by Henry Holland in 1781–2, including the heightening of the wings. In 1789, the 2nd Earl Harcourt re-erected the Carfax Conduit building in a prominent position in the park. It had had to be moved from Carfax in the centre of Oxford, where it was an obstacle to traffic.

At about the same time, a church with a wide tower with a domed roof was built about a mile north of the house.

=== Later developments ===
In 1904, after the death of Sir William Harcourt, Nuneham House passed to his son, Lewis Harcourt, 1st Viscount Harcourt, known by many as "Loulou". He had recently married Mary Ethel Burns, a niece of American financier and banker, J. P. Morgan. The estate inherited by the young couple was in need of major renovation, which they could not afford. Morgan established a £52,000 ($260,000) line of credit at his London bank for his niece, which he told her did not need to be repaid. The Harcourts used these funds to renovate the old buildings and grounds.

During the Second World War, Nuneham House and its surrounding parkland was requisitioned by the Air Ministry and became RAF Nuneham Park, a P.R.I.U. or photographic reconnaissance interpretation unit. Photographs taken by aircraft from RAF Benson and other airfields over enemy territory were examined here by RAF officers as well as small contingents from the Army, Royal Navy and the USAAF. Nissen huts and other, larger buildings were erected adjacent to the mansion, including a camp cinema which villagers were welcome to attend. The RAF station continued after the war in the same role until the mid-1950s, when the added buildings and roadways were demolished and the estate handed back to the Harcourt family, who sold it to Oxford University.

The 1780 painting of the Earl and Countess Harcourt by Joshua Reynolds was accepted as payment to the Government in lieu of inheritance tax and was then allocated to the Ashmolean Museum in 2010. The Harcourt Arboretum, part of the tree and plant collection of the University of Oxford Botanic Garden, occupies part of what were the grounds of Nuneham House. The landscaped parkland and pleasure gardens surrounding the house are listed Grade I on the Register of Historic Parks and Gardens. The estate includes the privately owned, two-storey Old Rectory, built in 1759 on the northern boundary by the first Earl. It was Grade-II listed in 1963 as part of the "Nuneham Courtney Park and Garden".

== Sources ==
- Rowley, Trevor (1978). Villages in the Landscape. Archaeology in the Field Series. London: J.M. Dent & Sons Ltd. ISBN 0-460-04166-5.
- English Heritage; Images of England, detailed architectural description
- Taylor, Christopher (1982) [1975]. Fields in the English Landscape. Archaeology in the Field Series. London: J.M. Dent & Sons Ltd. ISBN 0-460-02232-6.
