= Baron Horder =

Extinct barony in the Peerage of the United Kingdom

Baron Horder, of Ashford in the County of Southampton was a title in the Peerage of the United Kingdom. It was created on 23 January 1933 for the leading physician Sir Thomas Horder, 1st Baronet. He had already been created a baronet, of Shaston, in 1923. The titles became extinct on the death of his son, the second Baron, on 30 June 1997.

== Barons Horder (1933) ==
- Thomas Jeeves Horder, 1st Baron Horder (1871–1955)
- Thomas Mervyn Horder, 2nd Baron Horder (1910–1997)

== Arms ==
Coat of arms of Baron Horder
Crest Issuant from a rock Proper a demi-male griffin Sable. Escutcheon Per chevron Argent and Sable bezantée in chief a male griffin passant of the second. Motto Health And A Day
