= Thomas Horder, 1st Baron Horder =

English physician (1871–1955)

The Right Honourable The Lord Horder GCVO
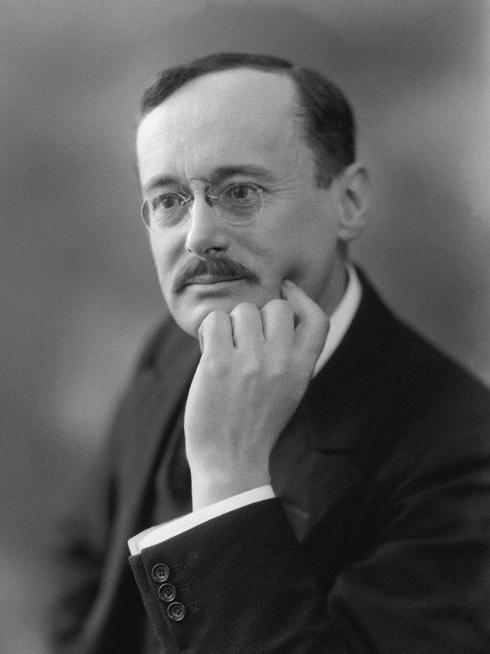
- Horder in 1921

Member of the House of Lords Lord Temporal
- In office 23 January 1933 – 13 August 1955; Hereditary Peerage
- Preceded by: Peerage created
- Succeeded by: The 2nd Lord Horder

Personal details
- Born: Thomas Jeeves Horder; 7 January 1871 Shaftesbury, England
- Died: 13 August 1955 (aged 84) Steep, England
- Spouse: Geraldine Doggett (m. 1902; died 1954)
- Education: University of London
- Occupation: Physician

Thomas Jeeves Horder, 1st Baron Horder, GCVO (7 January 1871 – 13 August 1955) was a British physician best known for his appointments as physician-in-ordinary to Kings Edward VII, George V, and George VI, and extra physician to Queen Elizabeth II. He was also the chosen physician of three prime ministers. He was knighted in 1918, made a baronet in 1923 and raised to the peerage in 1933.

== Biography ==
=== Early life and education ===
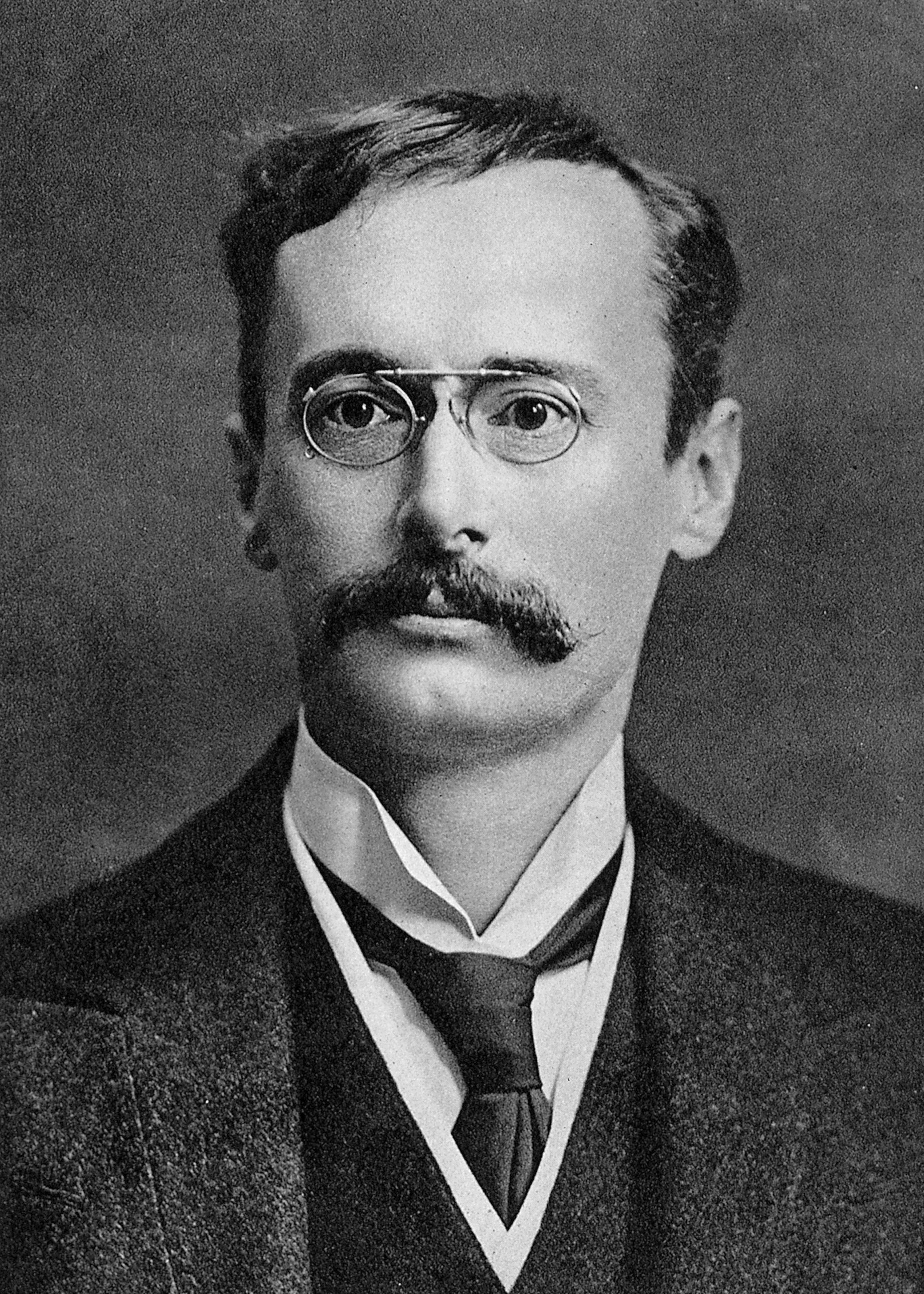
Thomas Jeeves Horder

Thomas Jeeves Horder was born on 7 January 1871, the son of draper Albert Horder, in Shaftesbury, Dorset. Jeeves was his mother's maiden name. He was educated privately, and at the University of London and St Bartholomew's Hospital, London.

=== Career ===
Horder began his career at St Bartholomew's Hospital, where his first junior post was under Samuel Gee. When still quite young, Horder successfully made a difficult diagnosis on King Edward VII which made his reputation. In 1908 he was appointed as the first physician to the Cancer Hospital, later known as the Royal Marsden Hospital.

His patients included every British monarch from Edward VII to Elizabeth II (except Edward VIII). They also included two prime ministers, Ramsay MacDonald and Bonar Law, and labour leader Hugh Gaitskell.

He was involved in many official committees, including advising the Ministry of Food during World War II. After the war he opposed many of Aneurin Bevan's plans for a national health service and may have helped modify some of those less palatable to the medical profession.

He held the positions of Deputy Lieutenant County of Hampshire; Extra Physician to the Queen (formerly Extra Physician to King George VI); and consulting physician to St Bartholomew's Hospital (1912–1936). Knighted in 1918, he was created a baronet in Bonar Law's resignation honours list (issued on 25 May 1923). He was raised to the peerage as Baron Horder, of Ashford in the County of Southampton on 23 January 1933.

Horder served as president of the British Eugenics Society from 1935 to 1949. He was president of the Cremation Society of Great Britain from 1940 to his death in 1955. From 1941 he chaired the Royal College of Nursing (RCN) Nursing Reconstruction Committee or 'Horder Committee' for the with four reports published between 1942-1949. In recognition of his work leading this committee he was made an RCN Vice President in 1942. He was also President of the Society of Registered Male Nurses.

He was president of The Peckham Experiment in 1949.

In 1954, Horder opened the Overdale Crematorium in Bolton.

=== Marriage and later life ===
In 1902, Horder married Geraldine Rose Doggett (1872–1954), of Newnham Manor, Hertfordshire, whose maternal grandfather was James Smith Rose of Arley House, Bristol, who in 1873 was the mayor of Totnes. Their son was the publisher Mervyn Horder (1910–1997). Their daughter Joy Horder married Edward Cullinan, chief physician at St Bartholomew's Hospital; their son was British architect Edward Cullinan.

He lived for many years at Steep near Petersfield in Hampshire, where he died on 13 August 1955. He was succeeded in his title by his son.

== Awards and honours ==
- 1918: Knight Bachelor
- 1923: created Baronet of Shaston
- 1925: Knight Commander of the Royal Victorian Order
- 1933: created 1st Baron Horder, of Ashford in the County of Southampton
- 1938: Knight Grand Cross of the Royal Victorian Order
- Hon. DCL (Dunelm.)
- Hon. MD (Melbourne and Adelaide)

Coat of arms of Thomas Horder, 1st Baron Horder
Crest Issuant from a rock Proper a demi-male griffin Sable. Escutcheon Per chevron Argent and Sable bezantée in chief a male griffin passant of the second. Motto Health and a Day

== Published works ==
=== Articles ===
- "Medicine and the State." JAMA, vol. 140, no. 14 (6 August 1949): 1135–1192. doi:10.1001/jama.1949.02900490008002.

=== Books ===
- Clinical Pathology in Practice. London: H. Frowde (1910)
- Cerebro-Spinal Fever. London: Hodder & Stoughton (1915)
- Medical Notes. London: Hodder & Stoughton (1921)
- Essentials of Medical Diagnosis with A. E. Gow. Cassell & Co. (1928)
- Health and a Day. Dent (1938)
- Obscurantism. Watts & Co. (1938)
- Lessons Taught by War-time Feeding (1943)
- Rheumatism. H. K. Lewis & Co. Ltd., (1944)
- Health and Social Welfare, 1944–1945. London & New York: Todd Publishing Company (1944)
- Health and Social Welfare, 1945–1946.
- Diet and Rheumatism (1945)
- British Encyclopaedia of Medical Practice (editor). Butterworth (1950–1952)
- Fifty Years of Medicine. Duckworth (1953)
- Bread: The Chemistry and Nutrition of Flour and Bread with Sir Charles Dodds and T. Moran. Constable (1954)

=== Book contributions ===
- "Methods of Obtaining Material from the Body for Bacteriological Examination (revised and amplified)" (Chapter 7). In: A Laboratory Handbook of Bacteriology, by Rudolf Abel, pp. 178–184. Translated by M. H. Gordon. Oxford University Press (1907). OCLC 977981595.
  - 2nd English ed. (1912). London: H. Frowde & Hodder & Stoughton. OCLC 970746575.
- Foreword to Poverty and Population: A Factual Study of Contemporary Social Waste, by Richard M. Titmuss, x-xiii. London: Macmillan (1938)
- Foreword to Democracy Marches, by Julian Huxley, ix-x. London: Chatto & Windus with Hogarth Press; New York: Harper (1941). OCLC 1029049289.

Peerage of the United Kingdom
New creation	Baron Horder; 1933–1955	Succeeded by Thomas Mervyn Horder
Baronetage of the United Kingdom
New creation	Baronet (of Shaston); 1923–1955	Succeeded by Thomas Mervyn Horder
