= Langley Park, Buckinghamshire =

Country house in Wexham, Buckinghamshire, England

Coordinates: 51°31′27″N 0°32′49″W

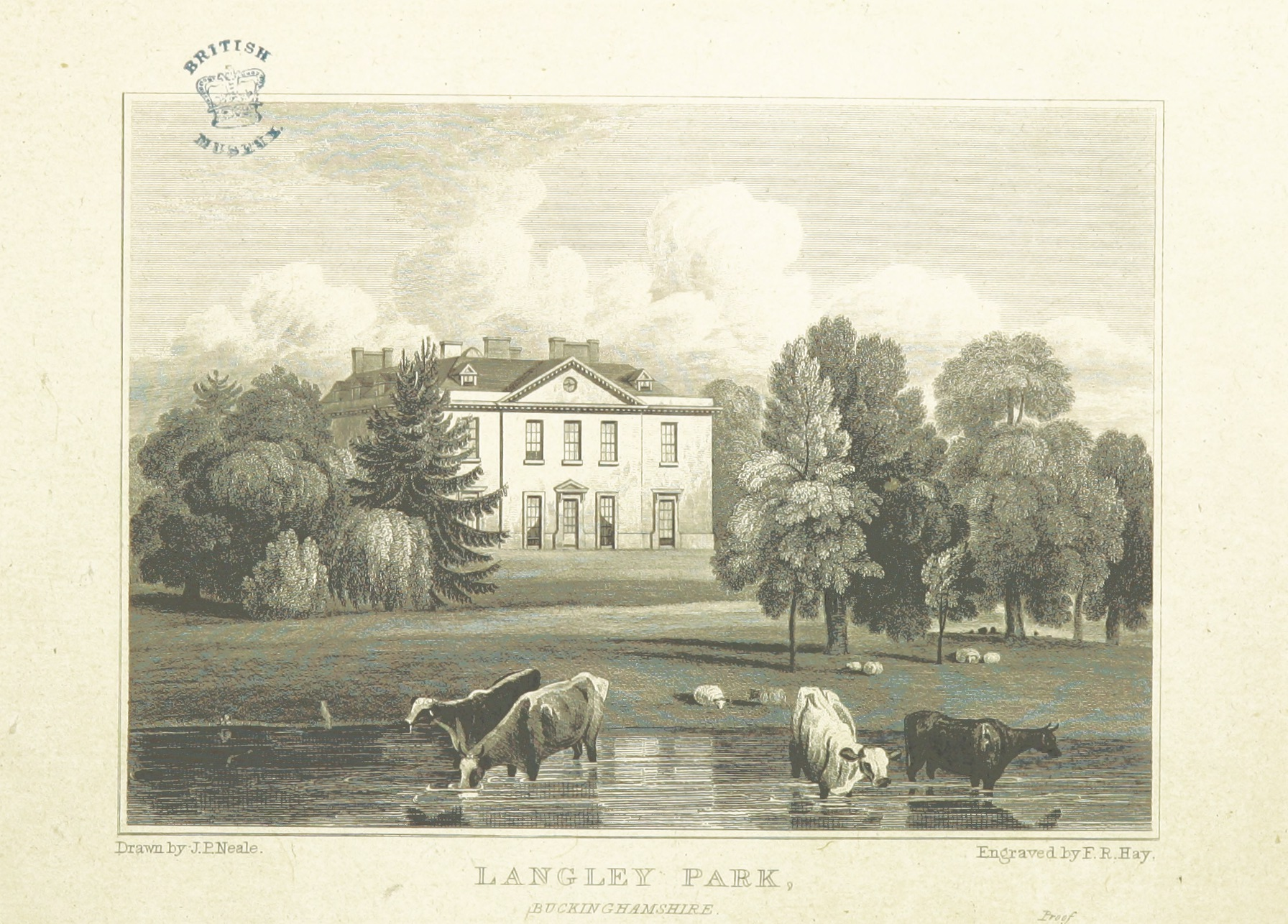
Langley Park, Buckinghamshire. Designed by Stiff Leadbetter, 1755–60. Engraving from John Preston Neale's Views of the Seats of Noblemen and Gentlemen, in England, Wales, Scotland, and Ireland (1818).

Langley Park is a historic house and estate in Buckinghamshire, England. The parkland is currently known as Langley Park Country Park, and is open to visitors. The house, designed and built by Stiff Leadbetter, is a Grade II* listed building, and the parkland, designed by landscape architect Lancelot 'Capability' Brown, and gardens are Grade II listed together. The house and grounds are owned by Buckinghamshire Council, and the house is leased as a privately run hotel.

== History ==
The present-day house is the most recent to be built on the site of a medieval deer park. The deer park is first mentioned in historical documents dating to 1202, and was crown property. It was used for hunting deer throughout the medieval period, with a hunting lodge.

A house with stables and outbuildings was built to replace the hunting lodge some time after 1603, when Sir John Kederminster (or Kedermister) was appointed Chief Steward of the Manor of Langley Park. In 1626 he was granted the manor and park, and the land was no longer in crown ownership.

In 1738 the estate was sold to Charles Spencer, 3rd Duke of Marlborough (1706–1758). He used the house as a hunting lodge for a time. In 1755 he commissioned architect and builder Stiff Leadbetter to build a grander house on the site, also to be used as a hunting lodge. This was situated about 100m south of the Kederminster house, and was finished in 1760.

George, the fourth Duke (1739–1817), succeeded his father in 1758, and commissioned famed landscape architect Lancelot 'Capability' Brown (1716–1783) to landscape Langley Park. This happened concurrently with Brown's work on the Duke's principal residence, Blenheim Palace.

In 1788 the estate was bought by Robert Bateson-Harvey (né Bateson; (later 1st Baronet, of Killoquin). The estate remained in the ownership of the Harvey family until 1945 when it was sold to Buckinghamshire County Council.

During the First World War Langley Park House was used as a hospital officers of the 2nd Regiment of King Edward's Horse (a cavalry regiment of the special reserve forces, formed in London in August 1914 and moved to France as a dismounted unit in May 1915).

During the Second World War the house was used as the SE Regional HQ of the Home Guard until 1944, and then as headquarters of the Polish units involved in the D-Day landings. In 1993 the house was leased for 99 years by Buckinghamshire County Council for commercial use but had become unused by 2001. The leasehold of the house was sold (i.e. the freehold remained with Buckinghamshire County Council) in 2004 for £2.4 million; in 2018 it reopened as a hotel run by the Marriott Group.

== The house ==
Langley Park House is Grade II* listed. The original house as designed and built by Leadbetter was a compact, villa-like house, with ashlar Woodstock stone, quarried from the Duke's estate there.

John Preston Neale's Views of the Seats of Noblemen and Gentlemen, in England, Wales, Scotland, and Ireland (1818) notes that "This Mansion is a handsome stone edifice; it is large and square, having a pediment on its principal front. The apartments it contains are well arranged and of considerable dimensions ... a piece of water runs along the South Front of the House, at the foot of a sloping lawn, on which are scattered some beautiful clumps of trees, and other woodland scenery; Windsor Castle, and the heights of the forest, form its distant view."

Robert Bateson Harvey (1825–1887), grandson of the first Harvey to own the house, added Vanbrugh-style quadrant wings ending in square pavilions with angle towers to the east (main) front in c. 1850–60.

== The gardens and pleasure grounds ==
The formal gardens on the north, west and south sides of the house were created between 1882 and 1899. They include gravelled paths, lawns and a rock garden, and in some areas are separated from the less formal parkland by a ha-ha. Together the gardens and the parkland are Grade II listed.

== The park ==
The park, designed by Lancelot 'Capability' Brown in the 1760s, has woods, a lake formed by damming a stream, pastures and trees in clumps and individually planted. At the site of a Palladian octagonal temple by Roger Morris (c. 1740, demolished in the mid-19th century) was a 30m-high oriental column (1864, demolished c. 1960). A rhododendron collection now grows in this area, known as the Temple Gardens.
