= Thomas Mervyn Horder, 2nd Baron Horder =

British composer and publisher (1910–1997)

The Right Honourable The Lord Horder

Member of the House of Lords Lord Temporal
- In office 14 August 1955 – 3 July 1997; Hereditary Peerage
- Preceded by: The 1st Lord Horder
- Succeeded by: Peerage extinct

Personal details
- Born: 8 December 1910 London, England
- Died: 3 July 1997 (aged 86)
- Education: Winchester College; Trinity College

(Thomas) Mervyn Horder, 2nd Baron Horder (8 December 1910 – 3 July 1997) was an English hereditary peer, publisher, and a composer of songs.

== Life ==
Horder was born in London on 8 December 1910. He was the youngest child and only son of Thomas Jeeves Horder, 1st Baron Horder, known as ‘Tommy’, who was created a baronet in 1923 and Baron Horder in 1933 in recognition of his services as physician to several British monarchs and Prime Ministers. Horder became the second Baron on the death of his father in 1955, inheriting the house and gardens at Ashford Chace, near Steep. After his studies at Winchester College and at Trinity College, Cambridge, where he read classics, in the early 1930s, Mervyn Horder attended the Guildhall School of Music, studying principally composition; he had also become a competent pianist. Horder opted not to make music his profession, becoming instead a publisher, and by 1938 was on the board of the small publishing firm of Duckworth.

Before the Second World War, Horder had acquired some flying experience, learning to fly the newly-invented autogyro, a combination of light aircraft and helicopter. He was accepted into the RAF Reserve, and saw service forecasting the flight paths of German bombers, then working in Intelligence in India, Ceylon (as it then was) and finally Japan. He attained the rank of Wing Commander.

Soon after the war, he returned to publishing and eventually became Managing Director of Duckworth's. He was also married, to a singer, Mary Ross McDougall, but the marriage did not last and ended in divorce. He did not marry again. He sold Ashford Chace in 1958 but retained an interest, having first of all commissioned the building, in the large grounds, of a small modernist studio house designed by his architect nephew Edward Cullinan, where he could devote himself to playing and composing. During the working week, he lived in a mews house in St John's Wood, near Lord’s Cricket Ground, taking little care of himself and becoming slightly eccentric. His habit was to invite a couple of his many literary and musical friends, and those whose careers he fostered, to dinner on a Saturday where they would sit in chaotic, paper-strewn surroundings entertaining him and themselves by playing piano concertos with him on the two Bechstein upright pianos he kept in the centre of his single downstairs room. At one end of this room could, when not obscured by the avalanche of papers usually issuing from a corner alcove, sometimes be seen a colourful mosaic platform or dais which was, as he explained, the claim to fame of the place, the decorative work having been executed by the artist in tesserae who had decorated the gentlemen's lavatories on the RMS Berengaria.

He sold his controlling interest in Duckworth’s in 1968. Music then took over as the main interest in his life. He composed mainly songs, both serious and comic, setting words from authors as diverse as Shakespeare and A. E. Housman, John Betjeman and Dorothy Parker. He wrote a ballet, The Unicorn in the Garden, as well as many carols and hymn-tunes and music for solo piano and piano duet.

Lord Horder died on 3 July 1997, aged 86, when his titles became extinct. His will directed that his ashes "be scattered from the top of The Tower Windmill, Burnham Overy Staithe in Norfolk, in a high wind" which was fulfilled by his relatives on 7 July 1997.

== Writings ==
=== Books ===
The Little Genius (1966), a biography of his father
On Their Own - Shipwrecks and Survivals (1988)

=== Anthologies ===
Ronald Firbank, Memories & Critiques
In Praise of Norfolk
In Praise of Cambridge
In Praise of Oxford
The Best of Dorothy Parker

=== Articles and reviews ===
in The Bookseller, London Magazine, Blackwood's Magazine, Cornhill Magazine, The Spectator, Private Eye, etc.

=== Prefaces and introductions ===
to editions of John Dundas Cochrane, Richard Henry Dana Jr., Johann Dietz, Maupassant, Dame Edith Sitwell, Anthony Trollope

== Music ==
at least 115 vocal settings, i.e. solo and unison songs, choral pieces, etc.
These include settings, sometimes grouped in cycles, of Auden, Barnes, Betjeman, Belloc, Bridges, Burns, Charles Causley, Chesterton, Walter de la Mare, Eleanor Farjeon, Robert Herrick, A. P. Herbert, A. E. Housman, Rudyard Kipling, Dorothy Parker, Shakespeare, Tennyson, W. B. Yeats

Norfolk Dances, for string orchestra
Hampshire Days, for string orchestra

Unicorn in the Garden, ballet, first performed by Harlequin Ballet Company, LAMDA Theatre, Earl's Court, London, 7 November 1964

The Orange Carol Book (1962)
A Book of Love Songs (1969)
The Easter Carol Book (1982)

== Arms ==
Coat of arms of Thomas Mervyn Horder, 2nd Baron Horder
Crest Issuant from a rock Proper a demi-male griffin Sable. Escutcheon Per chevron Argent and Sable bezantée in chief a male griffin passant of the second. Motto Health And A Day

== Sources ==
Obituaries in The Times, Daily Telegraph (8 July 1997), The Independent, Who Was Who

Peerage of the United Kingdom
Preceded by Thomas Horder	Baron Horder; 1955–1997	Extinct
