= Hugh Segrave =

Sir Hugh Segrave or Seagrave (died c. 1387) was a Lord Keeper of the Great Seal and Treasurer of England under Richard II of England.

After the death of Edward III in 1377, Segrave became steward of the household of Richard II and was appointed to a de facto council of regency, serving until 1378. After the Peasants' Revolt of 1381 and the beheading of the Lord Chancellor by the rebels, the king temporarily entrusted Segrave with the Great Seal and then appointed him Treasurer. He resigned the post in 1386 and died the following year.

Political offices
Preceded by Sir Robert Hales	Lord High Treasurer; 1381–1386	Succeeded by John Fordham
