= Baron Harvey of Tasburgh =

Barony in the Peerage of the United Kingdom

Baron Harvey of Tasburgh, of Tasburgh in the County of Norfolk, is a title in the Peerage of the United Kingdom. It was created on 3 July 1954 for the diplomat Sir Oliver Harvey on his retirement as British Ambassador to France. In November the same year he also succeeded his half-brother as fourth Baronet of Crown Point (see below).

The Harvey Baronetcy, of Crown Point in the County of Norfolk, was created in the Baronetage of the United Kingdom in 1868 for the first Baron's grandfather Robert Harvey, who had previously served as Member of Parliament for Thetford.

== Harvey Baronets, of Crown Point in the County of Norfolk (1868) ==
- Sir Robert Harvey, 1st Baronet (1817-1870)
- Colonel Sir Charles Harvey, 2nd Baronet (1849-1928) (1849-1928)
- Sir Charles Robert Lambart Edward Harvey, 3rd Baronet (1871-1954)
- Oliver Charles Harvey, 1st Baron Harvey of Tasburgh, 4th Baronet (1893-1968) (already 1st Baron Harvey of Tasburgh)

== Barons Harvey of Tasburgh (1954) ==
- Oliver Charles Harvey, 1st Baron Harvey of Tasburgh (1893–1968)
- Peter Charles Oliver Harvey, 2nd Baron Harvey of Tasburgh (1921-2010)
- Charles John Giuseppe Harvey, 3rd Baron Harvey of Tasburgh (born 1951)

The heir apparent is the present holder's son John Harvey (born 1993).

This title is not currently listed on the Roll of the Peerage, as of 1 November 2012.

=== Line of Succession ===
- Sir Robert John Harvey Harvey of Crown Point, 1st Baronet (1817—1870)
  - Colonel Sir Charles Harvey, 2nd Baronet (1849—1928)
    - Sir Charles Robert Lambart Edward Harvey, 3rd Baronet (1871—1954)
    - Oliver Charles Harvey Harvey, 1st Baron Harvey of Tasburgh (1893—1968)
      - Peter Charles Oliver Harvey, 2nd Baron Harvey of Tasburgh (1921—2010)
      - John Wynn Harvey (1923—1989)
        - Charles John Giuseppe Harvey, 3rd Baron Harvey of Tasburgh (born 1951)
          - (1) John Harvey (b. 1993)
        - (2) Robert Lambart Harvey (b. 1953)
          - (3) Oliver John Edward Giuseppe Harvey (b. 1988)

== Harvey baronets, of Crown Point (1868) ==
Oliver Charles Harvey was also 4th Baronet Harvey of Crown Point and Peter Charles Oliver Harvey was also 5th Baronet, see Harvey baronets of Crown Point
