= St John's Church, Jedburgh =

Coordinates: 55.481°N 2.553°W

St John's Church
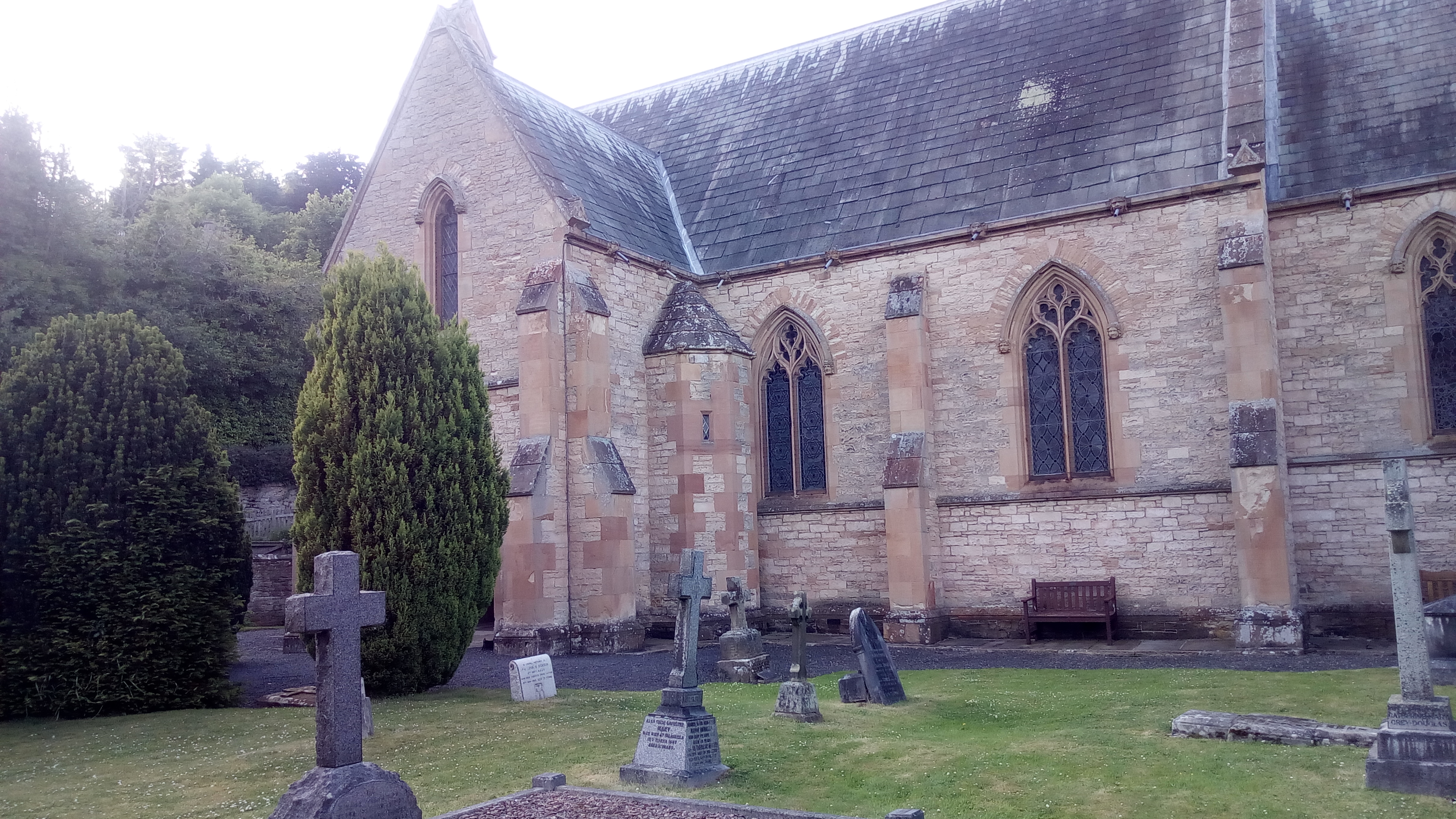

- Location in the Scottish Borders
- Location: Jedburgh
- Country: Scotland
- Denomination: Scottish Episcopal Church

History
- Status: Active
- Founded: 1843
- Founder: Cecil Chetwynd Kerr, Marchioness of Lothian
- Consecrated: 15 August 1844

Architecture
- Heritage designation: Category A listed
- Designated: 16 March 1971
- Architect: John Hayward
- Groundbreaking: 1843
- Construction cost: £4,000

St John's Church is a Scottish Episcopal church (part of the Anglican communion) in Jedburgh. It was founded by Cecil Chetwynd Kerr, Marchioness of Lothian. It is a category A listed building.

== History ==
Lady Cecil Chetwynd Chetwynd-Talbot married John Kerr, 7th Marquess of Lothian on 12 July 1831 and went to live in Scotland with her husband. Her favourite home was Monteviot House, but the family seat was Newbattle Abbey. She moved to Monteviot in 1840 in order to attend her nearest Episcopal church which was in Kelso. Her husband died in 1841. She took an increasing interest in the religious Oxford Movement who argued that Anglicanism needed to reintroduce aspects of Roman Catholicism into their high church practices. The followers were known as Tractarians and her spiritual advisor John Henry Newman was a leading thinker in the group.

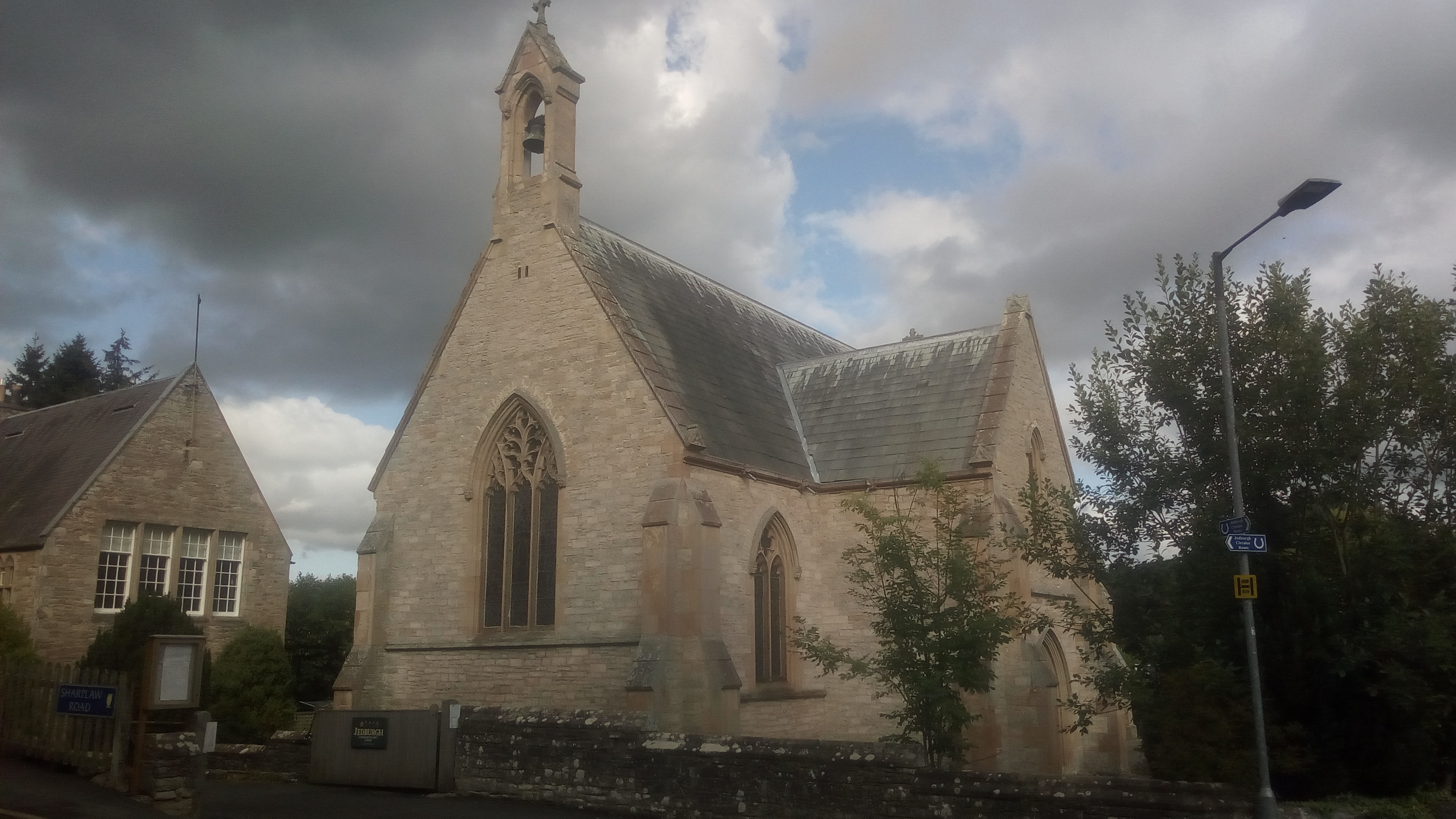
She founded St John's church in Jedburgh

Kerr funded the creation of this Episcopal church in Jedburgh because it was near to Monteviot. The church cost £4,000 and it could seat 200 people. It was designed by architect John Hayward with an interior attributed to William Butterfield and a lychgate that was his work. The foundation stone was laid in July 1843. It was consecrated just a year later on 15 August 1844. The sermons on that day were continued on the next day and on the 18 August with contributions by John Keble, Dr. W.F. Hook, William Dodsworth and Robert Wilberforce. The consecration, involving a procession of four bishops, forty clergy and a robed choir from Edinburgh, gathered a good deal of critical attention. The new incumbent, Reverend William Spranger White, was encouraged to hold daily services, weekly communions and to make sure that the church was never locked.

Two years later Newman became a Roman Catholic and in 1851 the church's founder Cecil Kerr converted to Catholicism. After she converted, Lady Cecil of Lothian went on to build a church, St David's, for the Catholic population in Dalkeith. She never entered the church again but it did enjoy the support of her nephew Bertram Arthur Talbot, 17th Earl of Shrewsbury and her son, Schomberg Kerr, 9th Marquess of Lothian who was Secretary of State for Scotland. The church's founder died on a religious visit to Rome in 1877 and her body was buried in her Dalkeith church at the foot of the altar.

From 1962 to 1967 John Habgood was Rector of St John's Church, Jedburgh. He would go on to be a bishop and a lord.

The church is a category A listed building.

== Charge ==
Priest-in-Charge (jointly with St. Cuthbert's, Hawick): Revd. Andrea Hofbauer, licensed in December 2023.

The church has Holy Communions on Sundays and Thursdays at 10 a.m.

== See also ==
- Jedburgh
