= Schomberg Kerr, 9th Marquess of Lothian =

British diplomat and Conservative politician (1833–1900)

The Most Honourable The Marquess of Lothian KT PC FSA Scot FRSE FRSGS
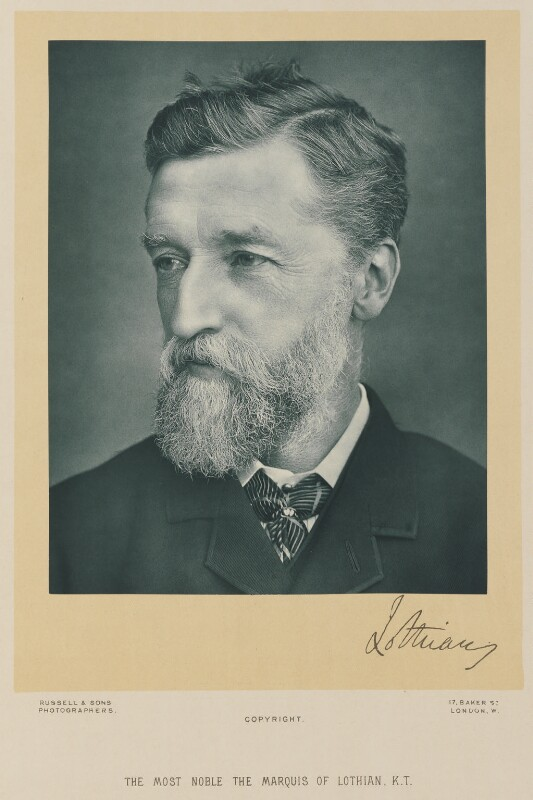

Secretary for Scotland
- In office 11 March 1887 – 11 August 1892
- Monarch: Victoria
- Prime Minister: The Marquess of Salisbury
- Preceded by: Arthur Balfour
- Succeeded by: George Trevelyan

Personal details
- Born: 2 December 1833
- Died: 17 January 1900 (aged 66) London
- Party: Conservative
- Spouse: Lady Victoria Montagu Douglas Scott (m. 1865)
- Children: 9 (see below)
- Parent(s): John Kerr, 7th Marquess of Lothian; Lady Cecil Kerr
- Education: New College, Oxford

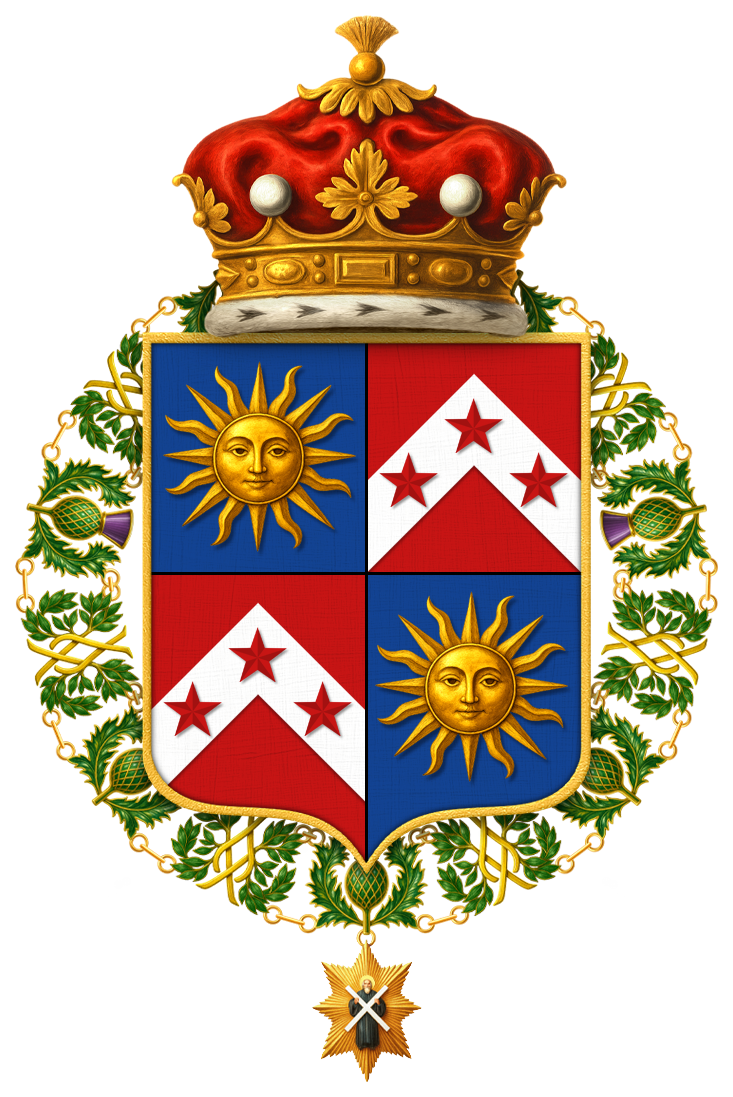
Shield of Arms of Schomberg Henry Kerr, 9th Marquess of Lothian, KT, PC, FSA Scot, FRSE, FRSGS

Schomberg Henry Kerr, 9th Marquess of Lothian, KT, PC, FSA Scot, FRSE, FRSGS, (2 December 1833 – 17 January 1900), styled Lord Schomberg Kerr until 1870, was a British diplomat and Conservative politician. He served as Secretary for Scotland under Lord Salisbury between 1887 and 1892. He was usually styled simply as Lothian.

== Background and education ==
Lothian was the second son of John Kerr, 7th Marquess of Lothian, and Lady Cecil Kerr. His younger brothers Major-General Lord Ralph Kerr and Admiral of the Fleet Lord Walter Kerr both had distinguished military careers.

He was educated at Trinity College Glenalmond, now Glenalmond College Perth, and was one of the first of 14 boys to join the newly started school in 1847. He later went to Eton College before attending New College, Oxford. He did not graduate.

== Diplomatic and political career ==
Lothian entered the Diplomatic Service and was an attaché at Lisbon and Tehran in 1854, Baghdad in 1855 and Athens from 1857, then second secretary at Frankfurt from 1862, Madrid from 1865, and Vienna from 1865. In 1870, he succeeded to the marquessate on the death of his childless elder brother, William, and took his seat in the House of Lords.

In 1886, he was sworn of the Privy Council, and the following year he succeeded Arthur Balfour as Secretary for Scotland and Vice-President of the Scottish Education Department in Lord Salisbury's Conservative administration. However, in contrast to Balfour, he was not a member of the cabinet. He remained as head of the Scotland Office until the government fell in 1892.

Apart from his political career, Lord Lothian was Keeper of the Privy Seal of Scotland from 1874, a post he held until his death 26 years later, and was also Keeper of the Great Seal of Scotland while Secretary for Scotland. In 1878, he was created a Knight of the Thistle, and in 1882 he received an honorary degree (LL.D.) from the University of Edinburgh. The students of the same university elected him Rector of the University of Edinburgh between 1887 and 1890. He was a Trustee of the Board of Manufactures in Scotland until his death.

He was Captain-General of the Royal Company of Archers, president of the Society of Antiquaries of Scotland (1876-1890) and Royal Scottish Geographical Society (1894-1898), and a Knight of Grace of the Venerable Order of Saint John of Jerusalem. From 1878 to 1889, he was Lieutenant-Colonel commanding the 3rd (Edinburgh Light Infantry Militia) Battalion, Royal Scots, (which had previously been commanded by his father and grandfather) and he later became Honorary Colonel of that battalion.

He is buried at Newbattle but memorialised in the Kerr family vault in Jedburgh Abbey.

== Family ==
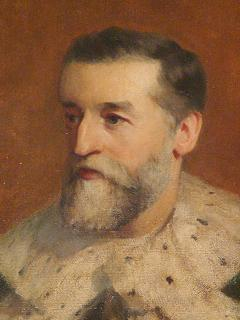
Portrait of the 9th Marquess

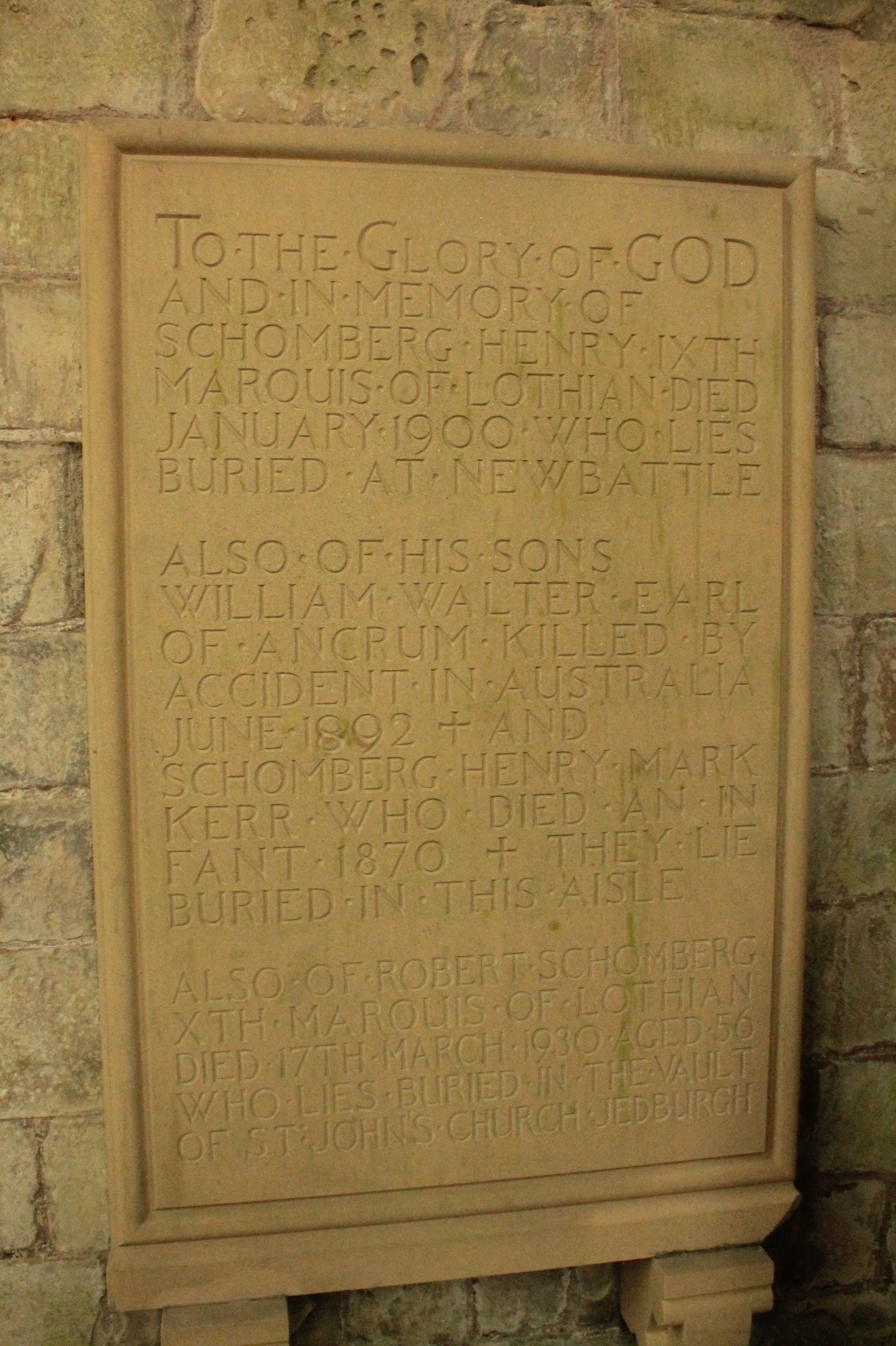
Memorial to Schomberg Kerr, Jedburgh Abbey

Lord Lothian married, in 1865, Lady Victoria Alexandrina (d.1938), daughter of Walter Montagu Douglas Scott, 5th Duke of Buccleuch. They had three sons and six daughters:

- Lady Cecil Kerr (14 February 1866 – 13 September 1919) married John Douglas-Scott-Montagu, 2nd Baron Montagu de Beaulieu and she founded the Ladies' Automobile Club. They were the parents of Elizabeth Varley.
- Walter William Schomberg Kerr, Earl of Ancram (29 March 1867 – June 1892)
- Lady Margaret Kerr (12 June 1868 – 2 September 1964)
- Lord Schomberg Kerr (4 August 1869 – 1877)
- Lady Mary Kerr (25 December 1870 – 31 December 1958), married Henry Kidd
- Lady Helen Kerr (9 December 1872 – 4 June 1968), married in 1902 her relative Major Frederic Walter Kerr (1867–1914), son of Admiral Lord Frederic Kerr (1818–1896), who was the youngest son of William Kerr, 6th Marquess of Lothian
- Robert Schomberg Henry Kerr, 10th Marquess of Lothian (1874 – 1930)
- Lady Victoria Kerr (7 November 1876 – 23 May 1956) married William Sullivan Gosling
- Lady Isobel Alice Adelaide Kerr (25 September 1881 – 26 December 1975) married James Cospatrick Hepburne-Scott

The eldest son Walter Kerr, Earl of Ancram (1867–1892) died in a shooting accident in Australia in June 1892, unmarried, while his second son Lord Schomberg Kerr (1869–1877) died in childhood.

Lord Lothian died at his town residence in London on 17 January 1900, aged 66, and was succeeded in the marquessate by his third and only surviving son, Robert. The Marchioness of Lothian remarried in February 1903 Bertram Chetwyn Talbot, son of Rt. Hon. John Gilbert Talbot.

Political offices
| Preceded by Arthur Balfour | Secretary for Scotland; 1887–1892 | Succeeded by George Trevelyan |
Honorary titles
| Preceded by The Earl of Dalhousie | Keeper of the Privy Seal of Scotland; 1874–1900 | Succeeded by The Earl of Leven |
Academic offices
| Preceded by The Earl of Iddesleigh | Rector of the University of Edinburgh; 1887–1890 | Succeeded by George Goschen |
Peerage of Scotland
| Preceded by William Schomberg Robert Kerr | Marquess of Lothian; 1870–1900 | Succeeded by Robert Schomberg Kerr |
