= Harriet Lowry-Corry, Viscountess Belmore =

Harriet Lowry-Corry, Viscountess Belmore (7 April 1762 – 14 July 1805), formerly Lady Harriet Hobart, was the second wife of Armar Lowry-Corry, 1st Earl Belmore. Following their divorce, she married William Kerr, later 6th Marquess of Lothian.

Lady Harriet Hobart was the daughter and co-heiress of John Hobart, 2nd Earl of Buckinghamshire, Lord Lieutenant of Ireland, and his first wife, the former Mary Anne Drury. She married the future Earl Belmore, then Armar Lowry, MP, on 2 March 1780, and they had one child:

- Lady Louisa Mary Anne Julia Harriet Lowry-Corry (3 April 1781 – 19 April 1862), who married George John Montagu, 6th Earl of Sandwich, and had children.

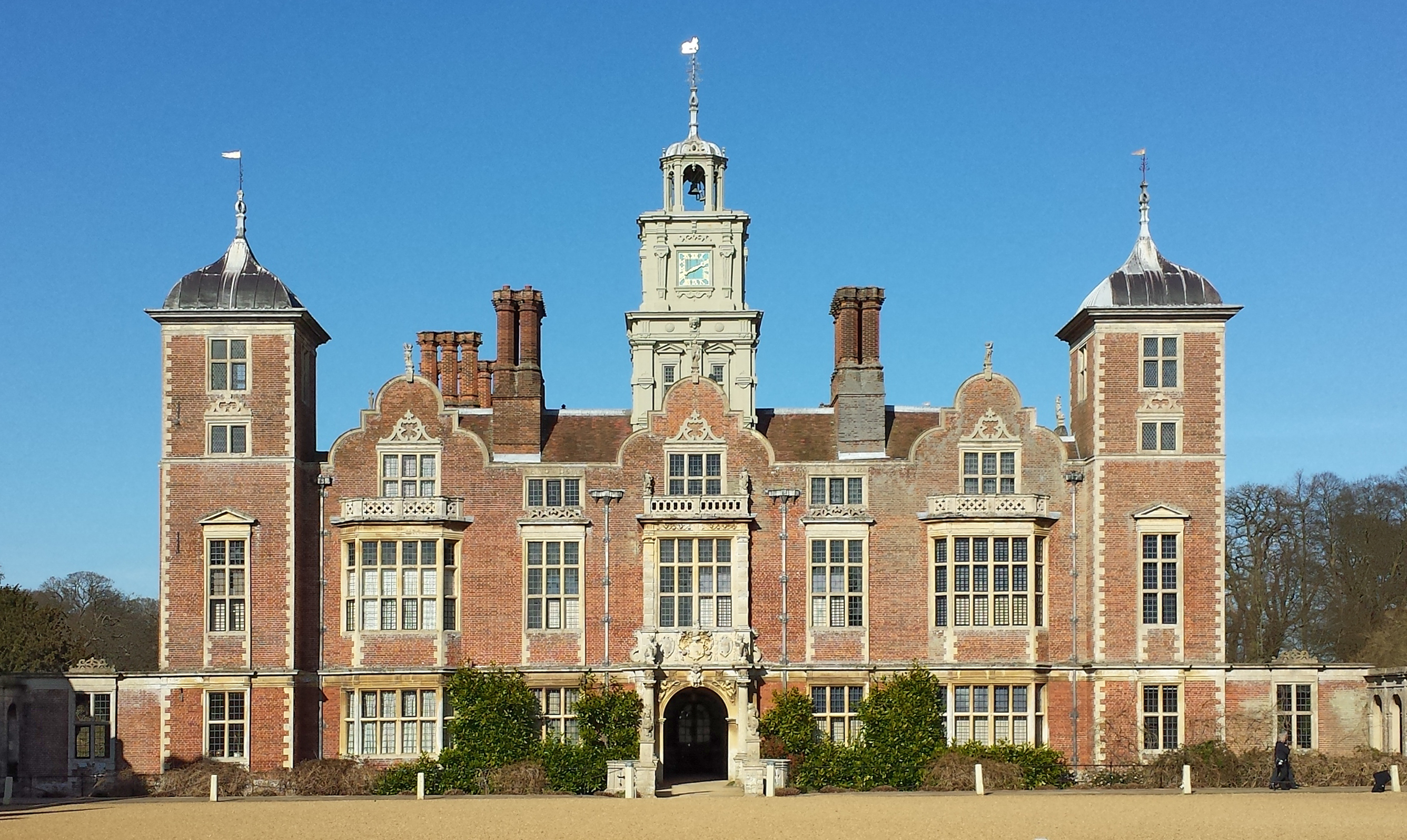
Blickling Hall, Norfolk

Following the birth of their daughter, Harriet separated from her husband. Lowry-Corry was created Baron Belmore, of Castle Coole at around this time, and later Viscount Belmore, but did not become an earl until 1797. The couple lived apart until their marriage was dissolved by an Act of Parliament in 1793. In the meantime, Harriet had formed a relationship with William Kerr, Lord Ancram, who was Lord Lieutenant of Roxburghshire and Midlothan and the heir to William Kerr, 5th Marquess of Lothian. Immediately after the divorce, on 14 April 1793, Harriet married Kerr. Belmore also remarried.

A year after her second marriage, her father died and she inherited Blickling Hall and family estates in Norfolk. With her second husband, she had a further four children:

- John Kerr, 7th Marquess of Lothian (1794–1841)
- Lord Schomberg Robert (1795–1825), soldier, who died unmarried and childless
- Lady Isabella Emily Caroline (1797–1858), who died unmarried and childless
- Reverend Lord Henry Francis Charles (1800–1882), who married Louisa Hope, a daughter of Sir Alexander Hope, and had children

She died, aged 43, before her husband inherited the title of Marquess from his father. He re-married a year after her death, his second wife being Lady Harriet Scott, by whom he had a further eight children.
