= Queen's Edinburgh Light Infantry Militia =

Auxiliary unit of the British Army

10th North British Militia Queen's Edinburgh Light Infantry Militia 3rd Battalion, Royal Scots
- Active: 10 March 1798–1 April 1953
- Country: Kingdom of Great Britain (1798–1800); United Kingdom (1801–1953)
- Branch: Militia/Special Reserve
- Role: Infantry
- Garrison/HQ: Dalkeith (1798–1878); Glencorse Barracks (1878–1953)
- Nickname: The Duke's Canaries
- Engagements: Second Boer War

Commanders
- Notable commanders: Henry Scott, 3rd Duke of Buccleuch; Lt-Col Edward Lisle Strutt

The Queen's Edinburgh Light Infantry Militia was an auxiliary (Note: It is incorrect to describe the British Militia as 'irregular': throughout their history they were equipped and trained exactly like the line regiments of the regular army, and once embodied in time of war they were fulltime professional soldiers for the duration of their enlistment.) regiment raised in and around the city of Edinburgh in Scotland. It was formed in 1798 and reformed in 1802, but had links with earlier Fencible and Volunteer units from the area. It served in home defence during the Napoleonic Wars and the Crimean War. Later it became a battalion of the Royal Scots and saw active service in South Africa during the Second Boer War. It served as a Special Reserve training unit in World War I, but after 1921 the militia had only a shadowy existence until its final abolition in 1953.

== Scottish militia ==
The universal obligation to military service in the Shire levy was long established in Scotland: all men aged from 16 to 60 were obliged to serve for a maximum of 40 days in any one year if required, and their arms and equipment were inspected at regular Wapenshaws. In time of war they would be called out by proclamation and by riders galloping through towns and villages bearing the 'Fiery Cross'. There is a record of Edinburgh Town Council calling out 200 men of the county militia to join the king's army on its march to Dumfries in 1588. The Edinburgh militia usually exercised on the Burgh Muir.

After the restoration of Charles II, the Scottish Parliament passed an Act in 1661, ratified in 1663, creating a militia of 20,000 infantry and 2,000 horse, available for Crown service anywhere in Scotland, England or Ireland. The quota from the county of Edinburgh was set at 800 foot and 74 horse. These troops were called out in 1689 after the Glorious Revolution. Thereafter the militia in Scotland, as in England, was allowed to decline. After the Jacobite Rising of 1715 a Disarming Act was passed in Scotland and although some militia served in the Government forces against the Jacobite Rising of 1745 there was a reluctance to leave weapons in the hands of those who might rebel.

== South Fencibles ==
The English Militia were conscripted by ballot, and this was revived in 1757 during the Seven Years' War. However, there were residual fears of Jacobitism in Scotland, so rather than embody the moribund militia, full-time regiments of 'Fencibles' were raised for the duration of the war by means of normal recruitment. Fencibles were raised again in 1778, during the War of American Independence, when Britain was threatened with invasion by the Americans' allies, France and Spain. One of the regiments formed in that year was the South Fencibles, raised by Henry Scott, 3rd Duke of Buccleuch at his residence at Dalkeith Palace and recruited from Edinburghshire, Berwickshire, Haddingtonshire, Linlithgowshire, Peeblesshire, Selkirkshire, Roxburghshire and Dumfriesshire. The regiment was only required to serve in Scotland, except in time of invasion, but the following year it offered to serve in any part of Great Britain. Among its duties were guarding French Prisoners of War in Edinburgh Castle. In the summer of 1780 the regiment was defending the west coast of Scotland from Kirkcudbright to Glasgow and Dumbarton. In 1782 it was marched from Glasgow to be quartered at Edinburgh, and that summer eight companies joined other fencibles in a camp at West Barns under the command of the Duke of Buccleuch. Following the signing of the preliminaries of the Treaty of Paris, the regiment was disbanded at Dalkeith on 1 April 1783 after five years' service.

== 10th North British Militia ==
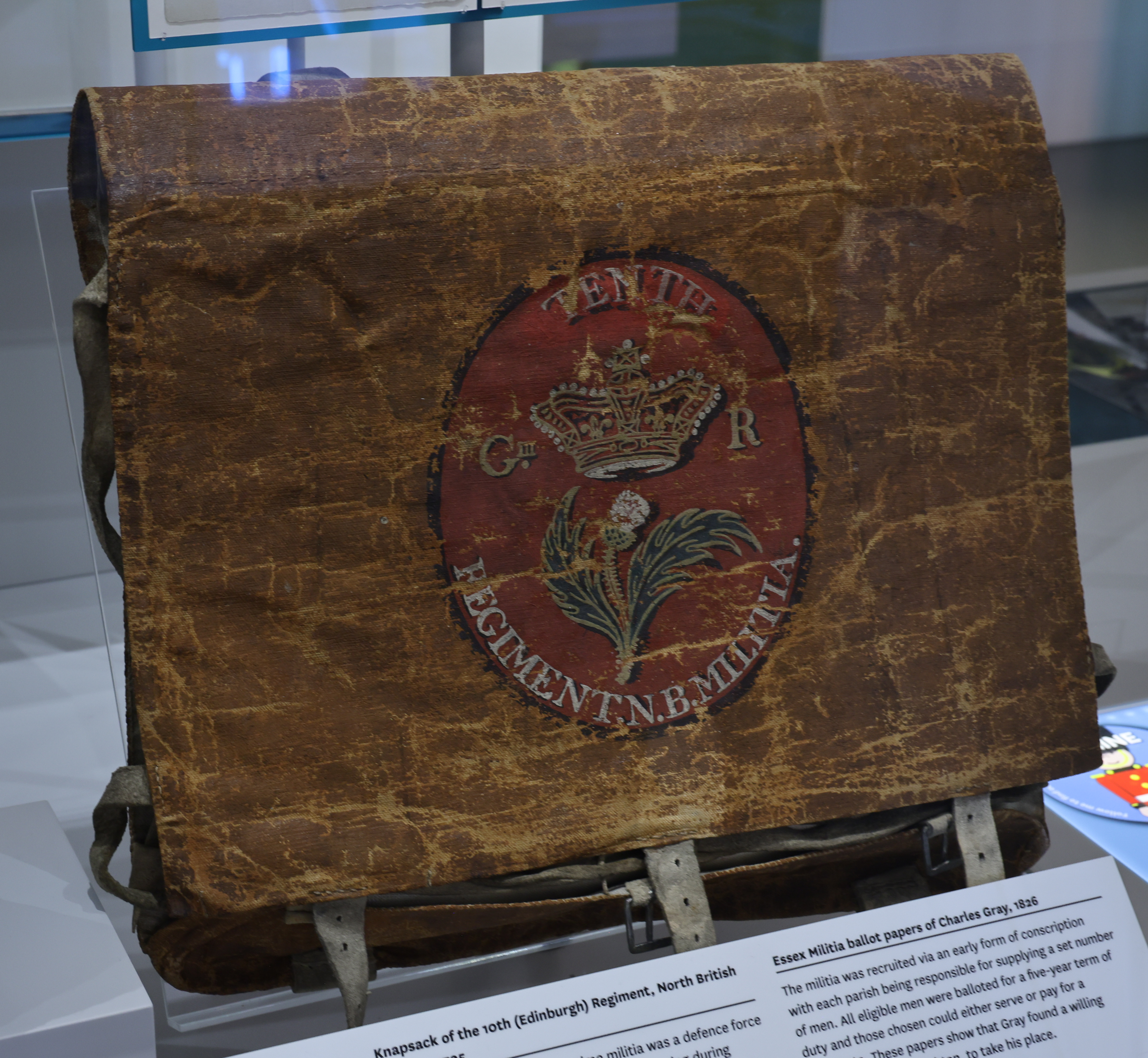
Knapsack of the 10th North British Militia

In view of the worsening international situation in late 1792 the English militia was embodied for service, even though Revolutionary France did not declare war on Britain until 1 February 1793. Fencibles were again raised in Scotland. Both England and Scotland also raised part-time bodies of Volunteers for purely local defence, including the 2nd Regiment of Royal Edinburgh Volunteers under the Duke of Buccleuch, formed in February 1797.

Finally, in 1797 Parliament passed an Act introducing the militia ballot in Scotland. This measure was unpopular and there were anti-militia riots in the west of the country, but Buccleuch ensured that paid substitutes would be available. Ten regiments of Scottish militia were raised in 1798 under the 1797 Act, including the 10th North British Militia. (Note: Some sources state that it was designated the Edinburghshire Regiment of Militia, or simply the Edinburgh Militia, or the Edinburghshire North British Regiment of Militia.) Once more it was raised by the Duke of Buccleuch (appointed 10 March 1798) at his Dalkeith estate. A number of officers and men were drawn from the 2nd Edinburgh Volunteers. The regiment's recruiting areas and quotas were defined as:

- Edinburgh (county): 230 men
- Edinburgh (city): 83 men
- Linlithgowshire: 74 men
- Haddingtonshire: 144 men
- Berwickshire: 153 men

The regiment of eight companies was ready for its first inspection on 18 September, and in early October it marched to Dumfries for its winter quarters, with detachments at Wigtown and Port William. In March 1799 the regiment supplied a detachment to assist the civil authorities to preserve the peace in Portpatrick. The regiment trained detachments to man the two field guns attached to each militia regiment. The men were permitted to help local farmers with the harvest. In March 1800 the regiment was moved to Ayr, with detachments at Newtown, Wallacetown and Stranraer; in June two companies went to Greenock with a detachment at Port Glasgow. Then in July the companies at Ayr moved into the barracks at Glasgow and took over guard mounting in the city.

The preliminaries of peace having been agreed in late 1801, the militia was prepared for disbandment. The 10th North British was marched in January 1802 from Glasgow to quarters in Musselburgh, Fisherrow and Inveresk, and sent its battalion guns to Leith Fort. From these quarters the regiment could assemble at Dalkeith Park for exercises. The Treaty of Amiens was signed on 25 March 1802 and orders were issued to disband the regiment. The men were paid off on 26 April except a cadre of sergeants and drummers under the adjutant (Captain James Fraser, formerly of the 78th Highlanders) and sergeant-major. (Note: The cadre equated to the permanent staff of the established English militia regiments.)

== Edinburgh Militia ==
In 1802 a new Act was passed, placing the Scottish militia on a permanent basis, to be manned by ballot from men aged 18–45 (paid substitutes were permitted), to serve for five years in Great Britain; peacetime training would be for 21 days. As Lord Lieutenant of Midlothian (Edinburghshire) the Duke of Buccleuch was required to raise the Edinburgh County Militia, and he took command of the regiment himself, many of the officers coming from the previous 10th North British, including the adjutant (and presumably his permanent staff). The armoury and depot would be at Dalkeith town because of the suitability of the area for training and exercises.

=== Napoleonic Wars ===
The Peace of Amiens soon broke down, and the new regiment was embodied for fulltime service on 11 April 1803, the men from the county assembling at Dalkeith, and those from the city of Edinburgh at Musselburgh. When they were embodied in 1803 the English and Scottish militia regiments were allocated places in a single order of precedence by drawing lots. The Edinburgh regiment received the number 51; formally, it became the '51st, or Edinburgh Regiment of Militia'. Although most regiments ignored the number, the Edinburgh unit did sometimes use it. These positions remained unchanged until 1833.

Militia duties during the Napoleonic War were home defence and garrisons, guarding prisoners of war and, increasingly, internal security in the industrial areas where there was unrest. The regular forces also saw the militia as a prime source of recruits, and between 1803 and 1815 the Edinburgh Militia supplied 833 men, particularly to the Scots Guards, 15th Foot, 94th Foot and Royal Marines.

From 29 June 1803 the regiment was in camp at Musselburgh as part of a Scottish Brigade temporarily commanded by the Duke of Buccleuch. In November the regiment returned to Dalkeith, where temporary barracks were erected at nearby Lugton, with one company detached to Newbattle and one to Lasswade. It continued to take part in field days with the rest of the brigade through the winter. In 1804 a Scottish Militia Brigade was formed with its headquarters at Inveresk, and the 'flank companies' (grenadiers and light infantry) of the brigade were drilled together at Portobello, Edinburgh. The brigade also found the guards for a Prisoner-of-war camp at Greenlaw House (later Glencorse Barracks). During the summer of 1805, when Napoleon was massing his 'Army of England' at Boulogne for a projected invasion, the regiment with 770 men in 10 companies under Lt-Col John Wauchope was housed in the town and barracks at Dalkeith. It was part of a militia brigade under Wauchope's command that also included the Berwickshire, Forfarshire and Dumfriesshire regiments at Musselburgh. In May 1807 the Edinburgh Militia moved from Dalkeith to Dunbar barracks, with one company detached at Eyemouth barracks. The duty was to assist in preserving the peace and aiding the revenue officers. It returned to Musselburgh in February 1808, then went back to Dunbar in February 1809. In April 1809 it went to Haddington barracks, and then to Edinburgh Castle in June, with a detachment at Leith Fort. The duties included escorting parties of prisoners of war.

In March 1811 the Duke of Buccleuch resigned command of the regiment and was succeeded by the Earl of Ancrum (later 6th Marquess of Lothian). On July that year the regiment left Scotland for the first time, sailing from Leith to Harwich where it went into barracks before being stationed at Colchester for nine months. In April 1812 the regiment moved to the large prisoner of war camp at Norman Cross Prison. There was an outbreak of Luddite machine-breaking in the English industrial districts, and in May the regiment was marched to Nottinghamshire, being quartered at Mansfield. In October it was quartered at Manchester with detachments at Bolton, Bury and Rochdale. After short stays in Birmingham and Somerset in February and March 1813, the regiment marched to Plymouth, being quartered in Frankfort Barracks from 31 March.

British militia units were now permitted to serve in Ireland, and most of the Edinburgh Militia volunteered to do so. It sailed from Plymouth on 26 June 1813 and disembarked at Monkstown on 12 July. It was then marched towards Armagh, but diverted to Derry where it arrived on 31 July. Most of the duty was to assist revenue officers in seizing illicit whiskey, which occasionally led to exchanges of gunfire – the militiamen involved in successful seizures received sizeable rewards.

The war having ended with the deposition and exile of Napoleon in 1814, the regiment was relieved in February 1815 and marched to Belfast where it embarked for Scotland. It reached Stranraer on 9 March and marched to Dalkeith, where the men were given leave before the regiment was disembodied on 3 April 1815. The Regimental Colours were laid up in Newbattle Abbey, the Marquess of Lothian's house. Unlike some regiments, the Edinburgh Militia was not re-embodied during the short Waterloo campaign of 1815.

=== Long peace ===
The permanent staff of sergeants and drummers remained at the depot at Dalkeith, where they formed a reserve for the civil authorities in cases of disorder. However, after Waterloo the militia were rarely assembled for training: in 1820, 1821, 1825 and 1831, but not thereafter. Although officers continued to be commissioned into the militia (the 7th Marquess of Lothian was promoted to the command of the Edinburgh Militia on his father's death in 1824, and when he died in 1841 he was succeeded by the 5th Duke of Buccleuch), the ballot was suspended in 1829 and the permanent staff (who were occasionally used to maintain public order) were progressively reduced.

The militia order of precedence balloted for in the Napoleonic War remained in force until 1833. In that year the King drew the lots for individual regiments and the resulting list remained in force with minor amendments until the end of the militia. The regiments raised before the peace of 1783 took the first 69 places: the Edinburgh regiment was drawn as 126th out of 129. It continued to appear in the Army Lists as the Edinburgh (County and City of) Militia, with HQ at Dalkeith.

=== 1852 reform ===
The Militia of the United Kingdom was revived by the Militia Act 1852, enacted during a period of international tension. As before, units were raised and administered on a county basis, and filled by voluntary enlistment (although conscription by means of the militia ballot might be used if the counties failed to meet their quotas). Training was for 56 days on enlistment, then for 21–28 days per year, during which the men received full army pay. Under the Act, militia units could be embodied by Royal Proclamation for full-time home defence service in three circumstances:

1. 'Whenever a state of war exists between Her Majesty and any foreign power'.
2. 'In all cases of invasion or upon imminent danger thereof'.
3. 'In all cases of rebellion or insurrection'.

The 1852 Act introduced Artillery Militia units in addition to the traditional infantry regiments. Their role was to man coastal defences and fortifications, relieving the Royal Artillery (RA) for active service. The Edinburgh City Artillery (later the Duke of Edinburgh's Own Edinburgh Artillery) was established as a separate regiment in 1854.

== Queen's Edinburgh Light Infantry ==
The outbreak of the Crimean War in 1854 gave impetus to organising the reformed militia regiments. In September the establishment of the Edinburgh Militia was set at 72 officers and non-commissioned officers (NCOs) and 657 privates in six companies. It was still commanded by the 5th Duke of Buccleuch, who was also Lord-Lieutenant of Midlothian. The regiment was embodied for service on 12 February 1852 and the men were billeted throughout Dalkeith, with the officers at the Cross Keys Hotel. The regiment lined the streets from Edinburgh railway station to Holyrood Palace on 6 September when Queen Victoria visited Edinburgh on her way to Balmoral Castle, and again on her return. As a result, the regiment was given the title 'Queen's Regiment of Edinburgh County Militia', quickly changed to 'The Edinburgh, or Queen's Regiment of Light Infantry Militia'. This cumbersome title was usually rendered as the Queen's Edinburgh Light Infantry (QELI).

The Crimean War having ended early in 1856, the regiment was disembodied on 28 May. Militia units that had been embodied were not called up for annual training again until 1859, after which it was held every year, the year's recruits attending 14 or 21 days' preliminary drill. From 1869 the regiment sometimes participated in brigade field days with the regulars and Volunteers in the area.

=== Cardwell reforms ===
From the late 1860s a number of army reforms affected the militia. A Militia Reserve was created in 1867, consisting of present and former militiamen who undertook to serve overseas in case of war. In 1869 the War Office began to supply the new breechloading Snider Rifle to selected militia regiments that had 'most systematically devoted themselves to rifle practice'; the QELI was one of those chosen.

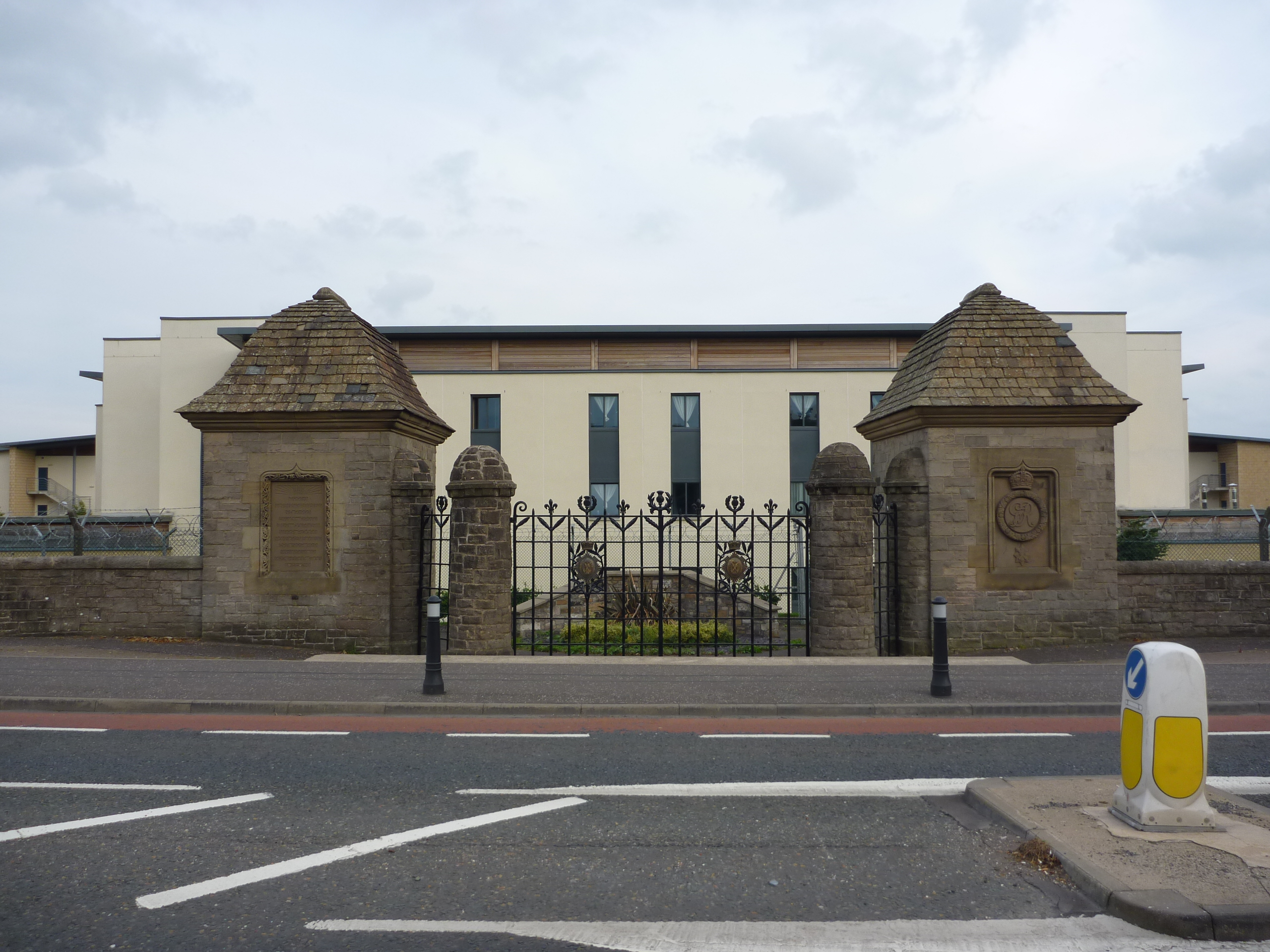
The old gates of Glencorse Barracks in front of the modern buildings.

Under the 'Localisation of the Forces' scheme introduced by the Cardwell Reforms of 1872, militia regiments were brigaded with their local regular and volunteer battalions – for the QELI this was with the two battalions of the Royal Scots (Lothian Regiment) in Sub-District No 62 based at Greenlaw. It was intended to raise a second militia battalion in the Lothians, but this never happened, through the QELI was increased to eight companies in 1874. Increasingly, the QELI's permanent staff instructors were drawn from the Royal Scots. The militia now came under the War Office rather than their county lords lieutenant, and officers' commissions were signed by the Queen. Around a third of the recruits and many young officers went on to join the Regular Army. In 1878 the QELI's headquarters (HQ) moved from Dalkeith to the brigade depot at the new Glencorse Barracks at Greenlaw.

Although often referred to as brigades, the sub-districts were purely administrative organisations, but in a continuation of the Cardwell Reforms a mobilisation scheme began to appear in the Army List from December 1875. This assigned regular and militia units to places in an order of battle of corps, divisions and brigades for the 'Active Army', even though these formations were entirely theoretical, with no staff or services assigned. The QELI was assigned to 2nd Brigade of 1st Division, IV Corps in Ireland.

The Militia Reserve of the QELI was called out in April 1878 during the period of international tension over the Russo-Turkish War that led to the Congress of Berlin. They served at the 62nd Brigade Depot until the end of July. In 1881 a fire destroyed the old wooden barracks at Glencorse that was occupied by the permanent staff and their families, but the involvement of the Fenians was ruled out.

== 3rd Battalion, Royal Scots ==
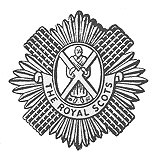
Cap badge of the Royal Scots based on the star and badge of the Order of the Thistle.

The Childers Reforms of 1881 took Cardwell's reforms further, with militia regiments formally joining their linked regular regiments as numbered battalions. The QELI therefore became the 3rd (Edinburgh Light Infantry Militia) Battalion, Royal Scots.

=== Second Boer War ===
On the outbreak of the Second Boer War in December 1899, most of the regular army was sent to South Africa, and many militia units were embodied to replace them for home defence and to garrison certain overseas stations, while other volunteered for active service. The 3rd Royal Scots was embodied on 5 December 1899 and volunteered for overseas service.

The battalion embarked with a strength of 21 officers and 570 other ranks under the command of Colonel Edward Grant. It disembarked at East London on 21 March 1900 and was sent to fortify Bethulie in the Orange Free State (OFS). Next it went to prepare defences at Kaffir River Bridge. At this point it formed part of 23rd Brigade under Major-General W.G. Knox, alongside the 1st Royal Scots. On 10 July the battalion moved to Kroonstad. The Boer leader Christiaan de Wet was operating in this area, and the battalion was ordered to cover the pioneer corps repairing the railway that he had damaged.

On 1 August Maj-Gen Charles Knox, was ordered from Kroonstad with a 2000-strong column including the 3rd Royal Scots to operate south of the Vaal River with other columns to block de Wet's access to the OFS. This was part of the 'First de Wet Hunt'. There were some exchanges of fire, in one of which a sergeant of the 3rd Royal Scots was killed, and on 9 August the column was engaged at Venterskroon. A British cavalry brigade contacted the Boers on 17 August and 3rd Royal Scots formed the advanced guard as Knox's column came up to join the engagement. However, the infantry columns were generally unable to keep up with the mounted Boers, and de Wet got away. In October Knox's column left Heilbron to relieve a force besieged by de Wet at Frederikstad. Knox continued harrying the Boers with his mounted troops while Col Grant was left to command the infantry, which was mainly employed in escorting the baggage train. Between1 October and 7 November the 3rd Royal Scots had marched 672 miles (1,081 km), often on quarter rations.

On 10 November 1900 the battalion took over a number of defence posts on the railway south of Kroonstad while its Mounted infantry (MI) detachment under Capt C.P. Wood operated as part of Major John Pine-Coffin's column in a number of engagements. In July 1901 two detachments from the battalion, under Capt Edward Strutt and Lieutenant C.E. Lambert took part in the first organised 'Drive' towards the Modder River attempting to trap the Boers, and afterwards in Lieutenant-General Sir W. Eliot's movement eastwards from Winburg. The detachments spent three nights camped at over 9,000 feet (2,700 m) and afterwards took part in the night attack that captured Commandant Marais at his Laager.

Meanwhile, the rest of the battalion along the railway had seen some action, Corporal Cummings and Lance-Corporal McKinnan distinguishing themselves in command of small posts that maintained their positions against attacks by much larger groups of Boers. In the later part of 1901 and early 1902 the battalion garrisoned about 40 miles (64 km) of the blockhouse line between Kroonstad and Klip Drift. Major Lord Tewkesbury, who had just succeeded his father as Earl of Munster, was killed in an accident at Lace Mines on 2 February 1902.

The 3rd Royal Scots embarked at Cape Town for home on 7 May 1902, shortly before the end of the war. It was disembodied on 28 May 1902, having lost 4 officers and 31 other ranks killed or died of wounds or accidents. The participants received the Queen's South Africa Medal with clasps for 'Transvaal', 'Orange River Colony' and 'Cape Colony, and the King's South Africa Medal with the 'South Africa 1901' and 'South Africa 1902' clasps.

=== Special Reserve ===
After the Boer War, the future of the Militia was called into question. There were moves to reform the Auxiliary Forces (Militia, Yeomanry and Volunteers) to take their place in the six Army Corps proposed by St John Brodrick as Secretary of State for War. However, little of Brodrick's scheme was carried out.

Under the sweeping Haldane Reforms of 1908, the militia was replaced by the Special Reserve, a semi-professional force whose role was to provide reinforcement drafts for regular units serving overseas in wartime. The battalion became the 3rd (Reserve) Battalion, Royal Scots, on 9 August 1908.

== World War I ==
=== 3rd (Reserve) Battalion ===
The battalion was embodied at Glencorse Barracks on the outbreak of World War I under the command of the Earl of Ellesmere and went to its war station at Weymouth, Dorset. As well as its coast defence duties, the battalion's role was to train and form drafts of reservists, special reservists, recruits and returning wounded for the regular battalions of the Royal Scots. In May 1915 the 3rd Bn returned to Edinburgh until the end of 1917 when it was sent to Ireland. There it was stationed at Mullingar until the end of the war. The battalion was disembodied on 5 July 1919 when the remaining personnel were drafted to the 2nd Bn.

The battalion's honorary colonel, Lord Henry Montagu-Douglas Scott, was appointed to command the 1st Public Schools Battalion, Royal Fusiliers, in September 1914, and he also commanded service battalion of the Bedfordshire Regiment. After the war Scott founded the Royal Scots Club in 1921 as a memorial to the fallen soldiers of the Royal Scots, making membership of the club open to all ranks.

=== 14th (Reserve) Battalion ===
After Lord Kitchener issued his call for volunteers in August 1914, the battalions of the 1st, 2nd and 3rd New Armies ('K1', 'K2' and 'K3' of 'Kitchener's Army') were quickly formed at the regimental depots. The SR battalions also swelled with new recruits and were soon well above their establishment strength. On 8 October 1914 each SR battalion was ordered to use the surplus to form a service battalion of the 4th New Army ('K4'). Accordingly, the 3rd (Reserve) Bn formed the 14th (Service) Battalion, Royal Scots, at Weymouth in November. It was to be part of 102nd Brigade in 34th Division and began training for active service. On 10 April 1915 the War Office decided to convert the K4 units into 2nd Reserve battalions to train reinforcement drafts for the K1–K3 battalions, in the same way that the SR did for the regular battalions. The battalion became 14th (Reserve) Battalion, Royal Scots and in May 1915 it moved to Stobs Military Camp outside Hawick in the Scottish Borders. Here a number of Scottish 2nd Reserve battalions gathered to form 12th Reserve Brigade. In October the battalion moved to Richmond and in April 1916 to South Queensferry. On 1 September 1916 the 2nd Reserve battalions were transferred to the Training Reserve (TR) and the battalion was redesignated 54th Training Reserve Battalion, still in 12th Reserve Bde, now at Kirkcaldy. The training staff retained their Royal Scotss badges. The battalion was redesignated again on 4 July 1917 as 201st (Infantry) Battalion, TR, and on 16 July it joined 191st Brigade in 64th (2nd Highland) Division at Cromer in Norfolk. On 1 November 1917 it was transferred to the Highland Light Infantry as 51st (Graduated) Battalion, remaining in 191st Bde in 64th Division, but moving to Holt, Norfolk. In April 1918 it was at Thetford, and in October 1918 at Fakenham. Postwar, it was converted into a service battalion on 12 May 1919 and was disbanded at Dreghorn on 31 March 1920.

== Postwar ==
The SR resumed its old title of Militia in 1921 but like most militia battalions the 3rd Royal Scots remained in abeyance after World War I. By the outbreak of World War II in 1939, the only officer remaining listed for the battalion was its Honorary Colonel, Lord Henry Scott (though the Royal Scots had a number of Supplementary Reserve Category B officers attached to it). The Militia was formally disbanded in April 1953.

== Uniforms and insignia ==
From its formation in 1798 the regiment wore red uniforms with yellow facings, giving rise to its nickname 'The Duke's Canaries'. When it became The Queen's in 1855 the facings were changed to the blue appropriate to a Royal regiment. The Regimental Colour of 1803 is yellow, with Edinburgh Castle embroidered in the centre.

The officers' oval shoulderbelt plates ca 1800 carried the star of the Order of the Thistle surmounted by a crown. Round the top of the plate was the title 'Edinburgh' and at the bottom 'Militia'. The officers' waistbelt plates 1855–81 carried the star of the Thistle in silver with a green enamel backing to the centre and the regimental title on the circle. The officers' Coatee button 1820–30 carried the crowned Thistle star with the title 'Edinburgh' below. The regiment adopted the light infantry bugle-horn as a badge after 1855, but when it became a battalion of the Royal Scots it adopted that regiment's insignia based on the Order of the Thistle and its uniform, including the doublet and tartan trews.

New drums were issued to the regiment while it was stationed at Derry in 1813–15. When it returned to Scotland the colonel ordered that they should be painted, including the Coat of arms of Derry among other insignia.

== Commanders ==
The following were among the commanders of the regiment:

Honorary Colonel:

- Walter Montagu Douglas Scott, 5th Duke of Buccleuch, former Colonel, appointed 21 May 1879
- George Grant Gordon, former Lt-Col, appointed 7 March 1900
- Lord Henry Montagu-Douglas Scott, former commanding officer, appointed 21 December 1912

Colonel:

- Henry Scott, 3rd Duke of Buccleuch, appointed 10 March 1798
- William Kerr, 6th Marquess of Lothian, appointed 25 March 1811, died 24 April 1824
- John Kerr, 7th Marquess of Lothian, promoted 33 June 1824, died 14 November 1841
- Walter Montagu Douglas Scott, 5th Duke of Buccleuch, appointed 6 January 1842, resigned 20 May 1879

Lieutenant-Colonel Commandant:

- Lt-Col Sir Archibald Hope, 12th Baronet, of Craighall, appointed 28 February 1856, resigned 28 December 1877
- Lt-Col Schomberg Kerr, 9th Marquess of Lothian, promoted 23 January 1878
- Lt-Col Edward J. Grant, CB, appointed 7 December 1898
- Lt-Col Lord Henry Montagu-Douglas Scott, promoted 11 November 1905
- Lt-Col John Egerton, 4th Earl of Ellesmere, promoted 11 November 1912
- Lt-Col Edward Lisle Strutt, CBE, DSO, promoted 6 January 1919

== See also ==
- Militia (Great Britain)
- Militia (United Kingdom)
- Duke of Edinburgh's Own Edinburgh Artillery
- Royal Scots
