= Lord Walter Kerr =

Royal Navy Admiral of the Fleet (1839–1927)

Admiral of the Fleet The Right Honourable Lord Walter Kerr GCB DL
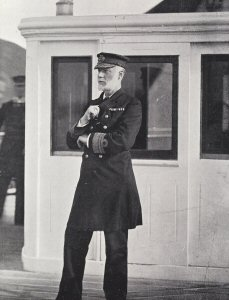
- Admiral of the Fleet Lord Walter Kerr
- Born: 28 September 1839; Newbattle Abbey, Midlothian, Scotland
- Died: 12 May 1927 (aged 87); Melbourne Hall, Derbyshire, England
- Military career
- Allegiance: United Kingdom
- Branch: Royal Navy
- Service years: 1853–1909
- Rank: Admiral of the Fleet
- Commands: First Naval Lord; Channel Squadron; Medway Steam Reserve; HMS Alexandra; HMS Inconstant; HMS Minotaur; HMS Agincourt; HMS Lord Warden
- Conflicts: Crimean War; Indian Mutiny
- Awards: Knight Grand Cross of the Order of the Bath

Admiral of the Fleet Lord Walter Talbot Kerr, GCB, PC, DL (28 September 1839 – 12 May 1927) was a Royal Navy officer. After taking part in the Crimean War and then the Indian Mutiny, he supervised the handover of Ulcinj to Montenegro to allow Montenegro an outlet to the sea in accordance with the terms of the Treaty of Berlin. He became Flag Captain to the Commander-in-Chief, Channel Squadron and then Commander-in-Chief, Mediterranean Fleet. He went on to be Second-in-Command of the Mediterranean Fleet, then Commander-in-Chief of the Channel Squadron and finally became First Naval Lord. In that capacity he presided over a period of continued re-armament in the face of German naval expansion but was unceasingly harassed by Admiral Sir John Fisher.

== Early career ==
Born the fourth son of John Kerr, 7th Marquess of Lothian and Lady Cecil Chetwynd Talbot. Kerr was educated at Radley College and joined the first-rate HMS Prince Regent as a naval cadet in August 1853. He saw action during the Crimean War serving in the first-rate HMS Neptune in March 1854 and then in the third-rate HMS Cornwallis in May 1855. Promoted to midshipman in August 1855, he joined the frigate HMS Shannon on the East Indies and China Station in August 1856. He saw action during the Indian mutiny when the ship's crew landed as a naval brigade in December 1857. Kerr was wounded near Cawnpore but still took part in the capture of Lucknow in February 1858. After being mentioned in despatches on 31 March 1858 and promoted to mate on 28 September 1858, he transferred to the royal yacht HMY Victoria and Albert in June 1859.

Promoted to lieutenant on 5 September 1859, Kerr was appointed to the steam frigate HMS Emerald in the Channel Squadron in July 1860 and to the second-rate HMS Princess Royal, flagship on the East Indies and China Station in February 1864. While serving on HMS Princess Royal and ashore in the treaty port of Yokohama, Kerr also found the opportunity to take some of the earliest photographic pictures of Japan and in 1866 helped to establish the first Rugby Football club in the country. Promoted to commander on 3 April 1868, he was posted to the ironclad battleship HMS Hercules in the Channel Squadron in November 1868 and was awarded the Royal Humane Society's silver medal for jumping overboard to rescue a man who had fallen from the rigging into the River Tagus.

Kerr became Flag Captain to the Commander-in-Chief, Channel Squadron and Captain of the battleship HMS Lord Warden in September 1871 and, having been promoted to captain on 30 November 1872 and while remaining Flag Captain to the Commander-in-Chief, Channel Squadron, he became Captain of the frigate HMS Agincourt in October 1874 and then Captain of the frigate HMS Minotaur in August 1875. He became Flag Captain to the Commander-in-Chief, Mediterranean Fleet and Captain of the frigate HMS Inconstant in February 1880 and then, while remaining Flag Captain to the Commander-in-Chief, Mediterranean Fleet, he became Captain of the ironclad battleship HMS Alexandra in March 1880.

Kerr supervised the handover of Ulcinj to Montenegro to allow Montenegro an outlet to the sea in accordance with the terms of the Treaty of Berlin in September 1880. He became Captain of the Medway Steam Reserve in December 1881 and naval private secretary to Lord George Hamilton, First Lord of the Admiralty in July 1885.

== Flag officer ==
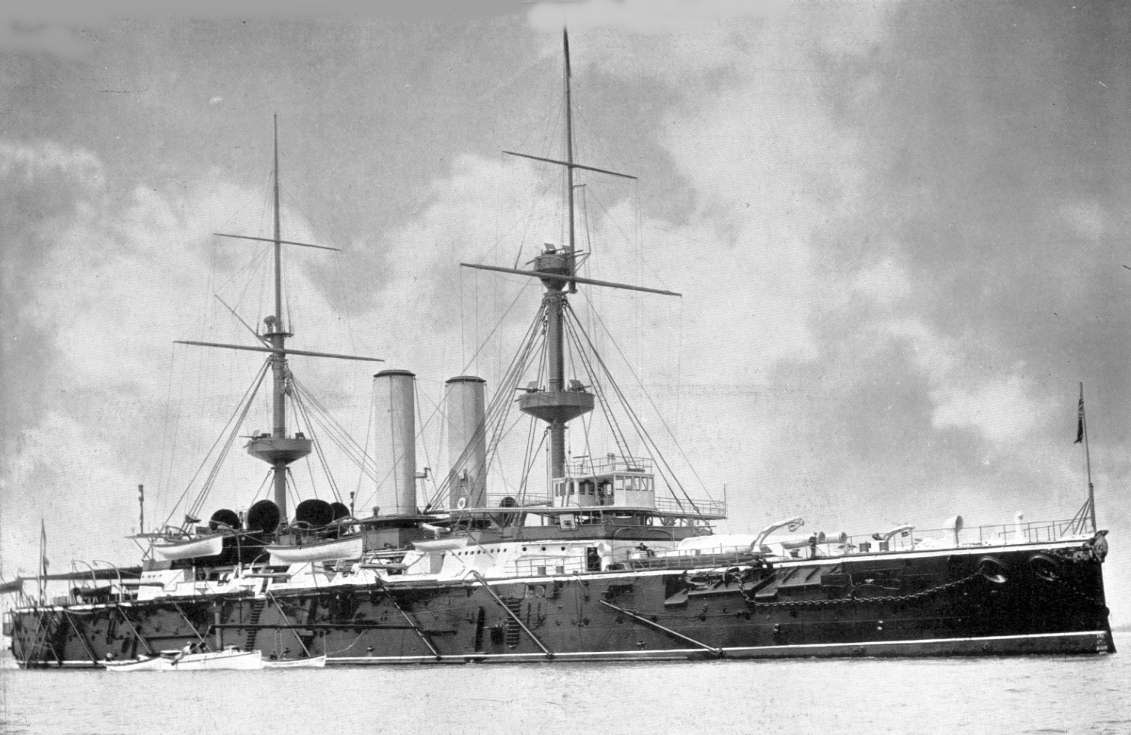
The battleship, HMS Royal Sovereign, Kerr's flagship as Commander-in-Chief of the Channel Squadron

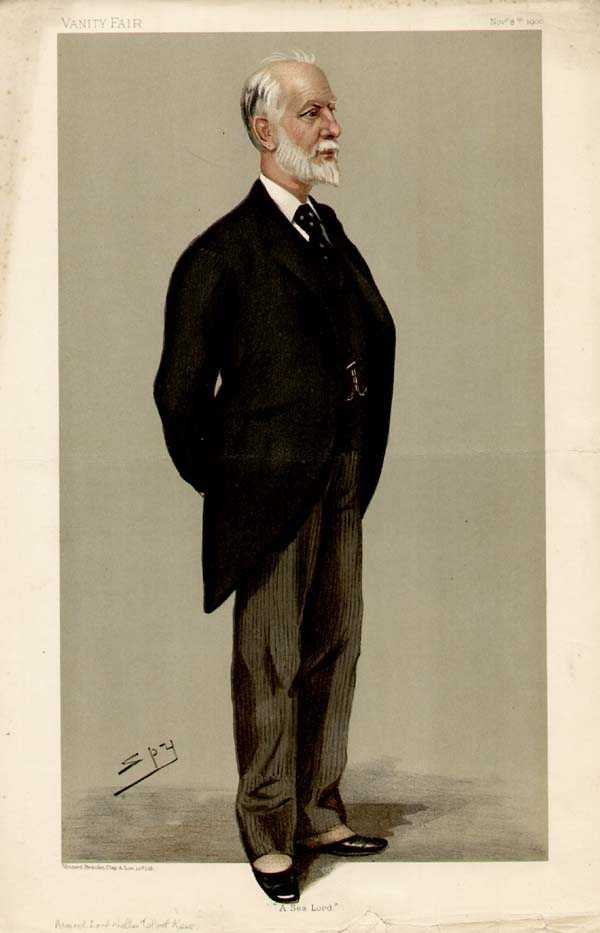
Kerr caricatured by Spy for Vanity Fair, 1900

Promoted to rear admiral on 1 January 1889, Kerr became Second-in-Command of the Mediterranean Fleet, hoisting his flag in the battleship HMS Trafalgar in April 1890 and then in the cruiser HMS Amphion in April 1892. He became Junior Naval lord in August 1892 and Second Naval Lord in November 1893. Promoted to vice admiral on 20 February 1895, he became Commander-in-Chief of the Channel Squadron, hoisting his flag in the battleship HMS Royal Sovereign in May 1895 and then in the battleship HMS Majestic in December 1895. He was appointed a Knight Commander of the Order of the Bath in 1896.

Kerr became Second Naval Lord again in May 1899 before being made First Naval Lord in August 1899, and promoted to full admiral on 21 March 1900. Following the succession of King Edward VII, he was advanced to Knight Grand Cross of the Order of the Bath (GCB) in the 1902 Coronation Honours list published on 26 June 1902, and received the insignia in an investiture on board the royal yacht Victoria and Albert outside Cowes on 15 August 1902, the day before the fleet review held there to mark the coronation. He was then promoted to Admiral of the Fleet on 16 June 1904. During his time as First Naval Lord Kerr presided over a period of continued re-armament in the face of German naval expansion but was unceasingly harassed by Admiral Sir John Fisher until he was replaced by Fisher in October 1904.

In retirement he was President of the Catholic Union of Great Britain: he lived at Melbourne Hall in Derbyshire, which his wife had inherited, along with Brocket Hall and the manor of Ayot St Peter. He was appointed a deputy lieutenant of the county on 26 January 1917 and died at Melbourne Hall on 12 May 1927. He was buried at St Michael's Church nearby.

== Family ==
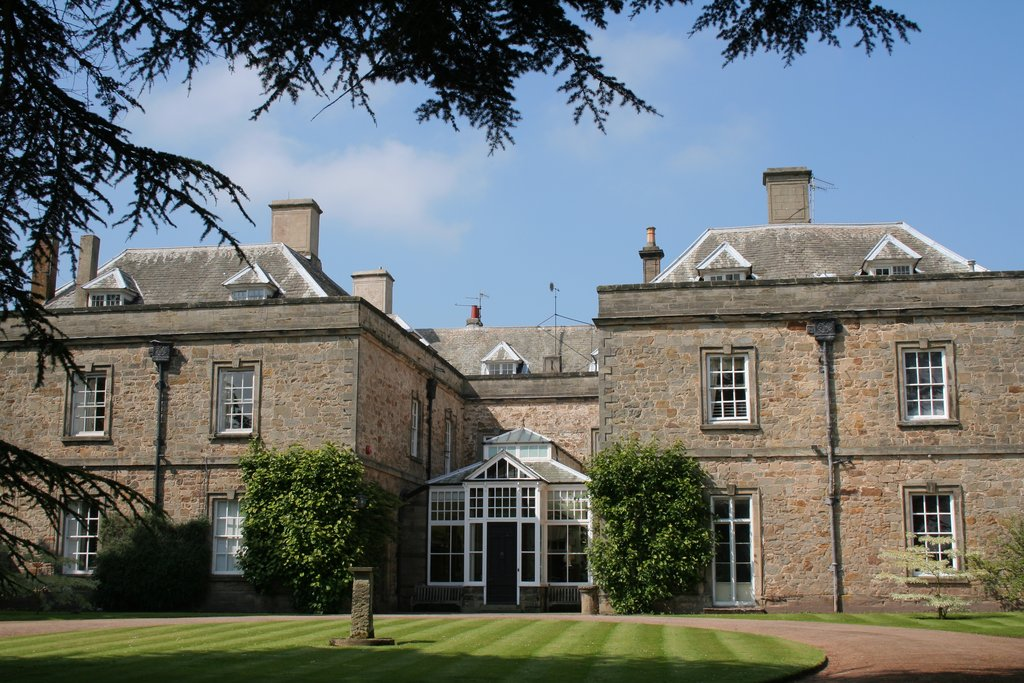
Melbourne Hall, Derbyshire

In 1873, Kerr married Lady Amabel Cowper, published writer, the youngest daughter of George Cowper, 6th Earl Cowper; they had four sons and two daughters:

- Ralph Francis (1874–1932), priest;
- Andrew William (1877–1929), married Marie Constance Kerr (a descendant of the 5th Marquess of Lothian) (1889–1929), had issue, including Peter Kerr, 12th Marquess of Lothian;
- Mary Catherine (1878–1957), nun;
- Margaret Mary (1880–1943), unmarried;
- John David (1883–1954), married Annabel Mary Ward (d. 1974), no issue;
- Philip Walter (1886–1941), served as Rouge Croix Pursuivant, killed on active service as an RAF pilot officer: married Dorothy Lucy Cave (a descendant of the 6th Marquess of Lothian)

== Ancestry ==
Ancestors of Lord Walter Kerr

16. William Kerr, 4th Marquess of Lothian
8. William Kerr, 5th Marquess of Lothian
17. Lady Caroline Darcy
4. William Kerr, 6th Marquess of Lothian
18. Chichester Fortescue
9. Elizabeth Fortescue
19. Hon. Elizabeth Wesley
2. John Kerr, 7th Marquess of Lothian
20. John Hobart, 1st Earl of Buckinghamshire
10. John Hobart, 2nd Earl of Buckinghamshire
21. Judith Britiffe
5. Lady Harriet Hobart
22. Sir Thomas Drury, 1st Baronet
11. Mary Ann Drury
23. Martha Tyrell
1. Lord Walter Kerr
24. John Talbot
12. John Chetwynd-Talbot, 1st Earl Talbot
25. Hon. Catherine Chetwynd
6. Charles Chetwynd-Talbot, 2nd Earl Talbot
26. Wills Hill, 1st Marquess of Downshire
13. Lady Charlotte Hill
27. Lady Margaretta Fitzgerald
3. Lady Cecil Chetwynd-Talbot
28. Gustavus Lambart
14. Charles Lambart
29. Thomasine Rochfort
7. Frances Lambart
30. James Lenox Dutton
15. Frances Dutton
31. Jane Bond

== Sources ==
- Boyce, George (1990). The crisis of British power: the imperial and naval papers of the second earl of Selborne, 1895–1910. Historians' Press. ISBN 978-0950890081.
- Heathcote, Tony (2002). The British Admirals of the Fleet 1734 – 1995. Pen & Sword Ltd. ISBN 0-85052-835-6.
- Mosley, Charles, ed. (2003). Burke's Peerage, Baronetage & Knightage, 107th edition, vol. 2. Wilmington: Burke's Peerage (Genealogical Books) Ltd. ISBN 978-1579580834.

Military offices
| Preceded by Sir Frederick Bedford | Junior Naval Lord; 1892–1893 | Succeeded by Sir Gerard Noel |
| Preceded by Sir Frederick Richards | Second Naval Lord; 1893–1895 | Succeeded by Sir Frederick Bedford |
| Preceded by Sir Robert FitzRoy | Commander-in-Chief, Channel Fleet; 1895–1897 | Succeeded by Sir Henry Stephenson |
| Preceded by Sir Frederick Bedford | Second Naval Lord; 1899 | Succeeded by Sir Archibald Douglas |
| Preceded by Sir Frederick Richards | First Naval Lord; 1899–1904 | Succeeded by Sir John Fisher |
