= St David's Roman Catholic High School =

Coordinates: 55°54′06″N 3°02′42″W

St David's RC High School
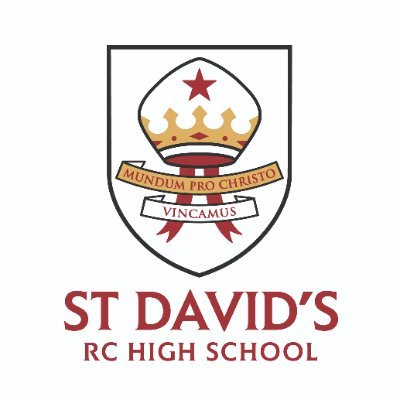

Location
- 1 Cousland Road; Dalkeith, Midlothian, EH22 2PS; Scotland

Information
- Type: State secondary
- Motto: Mundum Pro Christo (Conquer The World for Christ)
- Religious affiliation: Roman Catholic
- Opened: 1948
- Local authority: Midlothian Council
- Head teacher: Donny MacDonald
- Depute Head teachers: Catherine Jackson, Kerry Lewis and Peter Jeans
- Years: S1 to S6
- Campus type: Joint campus
- Houses: St Nicholas, St Cecilia
- School Tie Colours: Maroon with blue stripes worn by S1-S4 Light Blue tie worn by S5 Maroon tie worn by S6
- Website: www.stdavidshighschool.co.uk

St David's Roman Catholic High School is a Catholic secondary state school located at Cousland Road in Dalkeith, Midlothian, Scotland. It has shared the same campus with Dalkeith High School since 2003.

== Pupils ==
The school had a roll of almost 800 pupils in 2012. 75% of St David's pupils come from associated Catholic primary schools in Midlothian and East Lothian.

== History ==
A Roman Catholic School was founded in Dalkeith in 1854, following the establishment of St David's Church by the Marchioness of Lothian earlier that year. In 1876, the Sisters of Mercy came from St Catharine's Convent in Edinburgh to take over teaching responsibilities at the school, an arrangement that continued until around 1940. By 1880, the school had grown to accommodate some 135 pupils, with space for 100 more. The primary and secondary divisions of the school were separated in 1948, and St David's Junior Secondary School was opened that year in a building behind the church on Eskbank Road. This site, which did not have electricity, was closed in 1959, and the school was re-established as a six-year comprehensive secondary school in 1960, housed in locations at Croft Street and at Ironmills. In August 1966, the school moved to Abbey Road in what were originally the grounds of Newbattle Abbey, accommodated in several new buildings that were formally opened by the Archbishop of St Andrews and Edinburgh, Gordon Gray.

In November 2003, St David's was integrated into the Dalkeith Schools Community Campus along with Dalkeith High and Saltersgate School, a special education facility, making it the first such joint secondary school campus in Scotland. After the move, teachers kept students separated from each other in the dining hall and on the playground, citing concern that younger pupils might become disoriented by the sudden transformation of their small school into a large, integrated organisation with 2,200 youths. They initially predicted that the regime of segregation could be relaxed within a few weeks, and that religious factors played no role in their decision; by January 2004, teachers at Dalkeith and St. David's still told their pupils not to talk to pupils from the other school, and students were kept segregated due to threats of violence directed at one another and teachers of different religious backgrounds in addition to assaults.

== School of Football ==
St David's High School are currently in their second year of delivering the School of Football program and are intending to introduce a new S1 group each year for the foreseeable future.

== Notable former students ==
- Darren Fletcher (b. 1984) - footballer, Manchester United F.C., Scotland national team; was inducted into Midlothian Council's Hall of Fame in 2009.
- Keith Jack (b. 1988) - actor and singer.

== See also ==
- St David's Church, Dalkeith
