= Lord Lieutenant of Roxburghshire =

Ceremonial officer in Roxburghshire, Scotland

This is a list of people who have served as Lord Lieutenant of Roxburghshire. The office was replaced by the Lord Lieutenant of Roxburgh, Ettrick and Lauderdale in 1975.

- John Ker, 3rd Duke of Roxburghe 17 March 1794 – 19 March 1804
- Henry Scott, 3rd Duke of Buccleuch 28 May 1804 – 11 January 1812
- William Kerr, 6th Marquess of Lothian 25 January 1812 – 27 April 1824
- John Kerr, 7th Marquess of Lothian 2 June 1824 – 14 November 1841
- Walter Montagu Douglas Scott, 5th Duke of Buccleuch 30 November 1841 – 16 April 1884
- James Innes-Ker, 7th Duke of Roxburghe 17 May 1884 – 23 October 1892
- Donald Mackay, 11th Lord Reay 14 November 1892 – 1918
- Henry Innes-Ker, 8th Duke of Roxburghe 25 January 1918 – 29 September 1932
- Walter Montagu Douglas Scott, 8th Duke of Buccleuch 3 November 1932 – 4 October 1973
- John Scott, 9th Duke of Buccleuch 10 June 1974 – 1975
- Buccleuch became Lord Lieutenant of Roxburgh, Ettrick and Lauderdale
