= Monteviot House =

House in Scottish Borders, Scotland, UK

Coordinates: 55.5147°N 2.5576°W

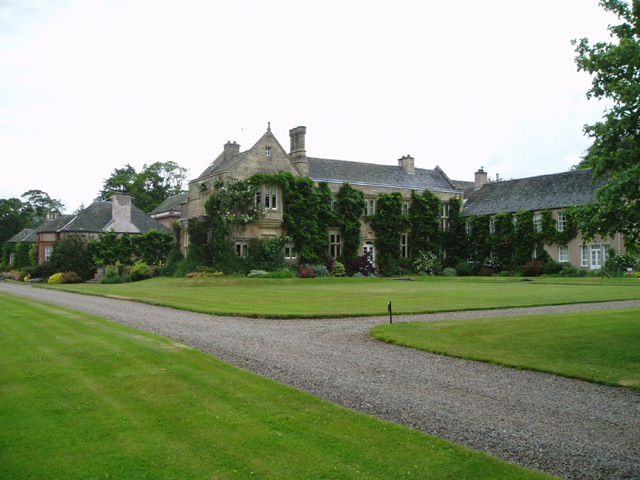
- Monteviot House

- Location within Scottish Borders

Record height
- Surpassed by

Inventory of Gardens and Designed Landscapes in Scotland
- Official name: Monteviot
- Designated: 30 June 1987
- Reference no.: GDL00288

General information
- Architectural style: Gothic
- Location: Scottish Borders, Near Jedburgh, Scotland
- Completed: 1740
- Renovated: 1830, 1950-1962
- Owner: 13th Marquess of Lothian

Monteviot House is the early 18th century home of the Marquess of Lothian, the politician better known as Michael Ancram. It is located on the River Teviot near Jedburgh in the Scottish Borders area of Scotland.

== History ==
The house which sits within 30 acres (12 ha) of land and it was built in about 1740. The lyricist Jean Elliot who wrote words to the lament Flowers of the Forest, died at Monteviot, her brother's house, on 29 March 1805. Her brother Admiral John Eliot died here in 1808 after a distinguished career as Governor of Newfoundland and rose to be an Admiral of the White. He left his estates to Gilbert Elliot, first earl of Minto.

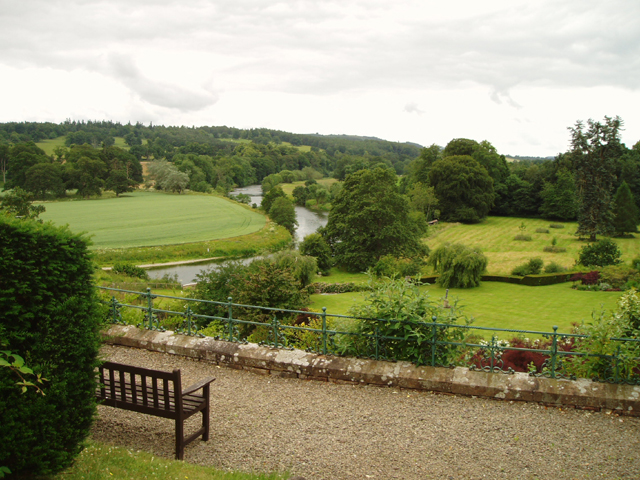
River Teviot from Monteviot House garden

Further building work took place in 1830 just before John Kerr, 7th Marquess of Lothian married Lady Cecil Chetwynd Chetwynd-Talbot. The couple were based at Newbattle Abbey but Cecil Kerr preferred Monteviot. She had moved to Monteviot in 1840 in order to attend the Episcopalian church in Kelso. When she commissioned her first church, St John's, it was in nearby Jedburgh.

In 1950 the 12th Marquess and his wife Tony moved from Melbourne Hall to the Scottish Borders in 1950 where they oversaw the restoration of Monteviot House. They did not move into the house until 1962.

In the late 20th century the 12th Marquess repurchased and restored the old family seat of Ferniehirst Castle. They moved into the castle in 1986. The Lothians also used to own two grander country houses, Blickling Hall, which now belongs to the National Trust, and Newbattle Abbey, which is now the site of an adult education college.

== See also ==
- Clan Kerr
- Michael Ancram
- List of places in the Scottish Borders
- List of places in Scotland
