= Walter Montagu-Douglas-Scott, 5th Duke of Buccleuch =

Scottish politician and nobleman (1806 – 1884)

His Grace The Duke of Buccleuch and Queensberry KG KT PC FRS FRSE
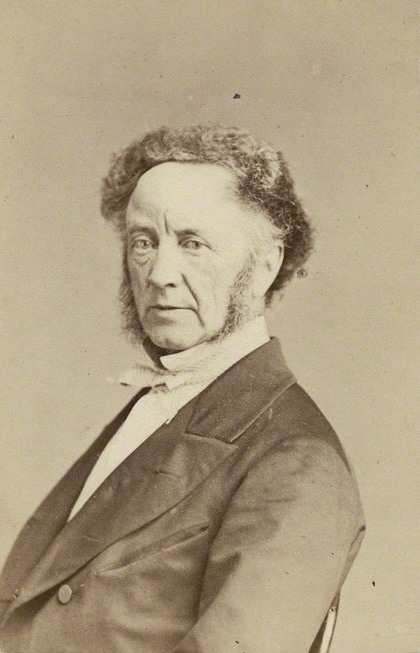
- The Duke of Buccleuch photographed by H. J. Whitlock c. 1860s

Lord President of the Council
- In office 21 January 1846 – 6 July 1846
- Prime Minister: Sir Robert Peel, Bt
- Preceded by: The Lord Wharncliffe
- Succeeded by: The Marquess of Lansdowne

Lord Keeper of the Privy Seal
- In office 2 February 1842 – 21 January 1846
- Prime Minister: Sir Robert Peel, Bt
- Preceded by: The Duke of Buckingham and Chandos
- Succeeded by: The Earl of Haddington

Personal details
- Born: Lord Walter Francis Montagu-Scott; 25 November 1806 Dalkeith Palace, Midlothian, Scotland
- Died: 16 April 1884 (aged 77) Bowhill House, Selkirkshire, Scotland
- Party: Conservative
- Spouse: Lady Charlotte Thynne (m. 1829)
- Children: William Montagu Douglas Scott, 6th Duke of Buccleuch; Henry Douglas-Scott-Montagu, 1st Baron Montagu of Beaulieu; Lord Walter Montagu Douglas Scott; Lord Charles Montagu Douglas Scott; Victoria Kerr, Marchioness of Lothian; Lady Margaret Cameron; Lady Mary Trefusis
- Parents: Charles Scott, 4th Duke of Buccleuch; The Hon. Harriet Katherine Townshend
- Education: St John's College, Cambridge

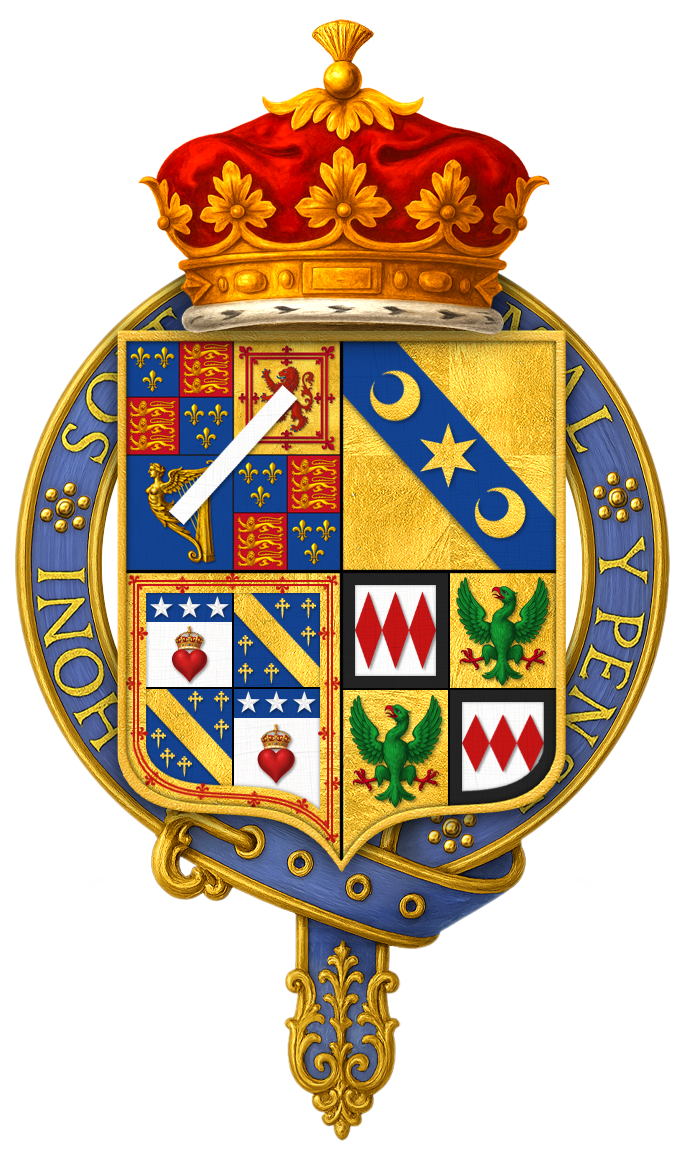
Garter-encircled arms of Walter Montagu Douglas Scott, 5th Duke of Buccleuch, KG

Walter Francis Montagu-Douglas-Scott, 5th Duke of Buccleuch, 7th Duke of Queensberry (25 November 1806 – 16 April 1884), styled Lord Eskdail between 1808 and 1812 and Earl of Dalkeith between 1812 and 1819, was a prominent Scottish nobleman, landowner and politician. He was Lord Keeper of the Privy Seal from 1842 to 1846 and Lord President of the Council.

== Background and education ==
Buccleuch was born at the Palace of Dalkeith, Midlothian, Scotland, the fifth child of seven, and second son of Charles Montagu-Scott, 4th Duke of Buccleuch, and Hon. Harriet Katherine Townshend, daughter of Thomas Townshend, 1st Viscount Sydney and Elizabeth Powys. Walter was a direct male-line descendant of Charles II of England through James Scott. When his older brother, George Henry, died at the age of 10 from measles, Walter became heir apparent to the Dukedoms of Buccleuch and Queensberry. He was only thirteen when he succeeded his father to the two Dukedoms in 1819. He also inherited 460,000 acres, including 254,000 acres in Dumfries, 104,000 acres in Roxburgh and 60,000 acres in Selkirk. He was educated at Eton and St John's College, Cambridge (M.A., 1827). In June 1833 he was elected a Fellow of the Royal Society. In 1841, he played in two first-class cricket matches for Marylebone Cricket Club. He was made an honorary member of the Institution of Civil Engineers on the 28th of June, 1812 in recognition of his involvement in great works of engineering in Scotland, such as Granton Harbour. Buccleuch set out his ideas of the duties of a great landowner in a speech given at Branxholme Fete in 1839:

What has been entrusted to me has not been given that it might be wasted in idle or frivolous amusements; nor would I be justified in wasting the hard earnings of the tillers of the soil by carrying them away and spending them in foreign countries, but I wish to see them employed as the means of producing good to them and to the country at large.

Buccleuch, Lord of the Liberty and Manors of Furness, and owner of extensive iron-mines in the area was, in conjunction with William Cavendish, 7th Duke of Devonshire, a main sponsor of the Furness Railway. He bought up a great deal of land in the area, and rebuilt Lindal-in-Furness as a model village.

== Career ==
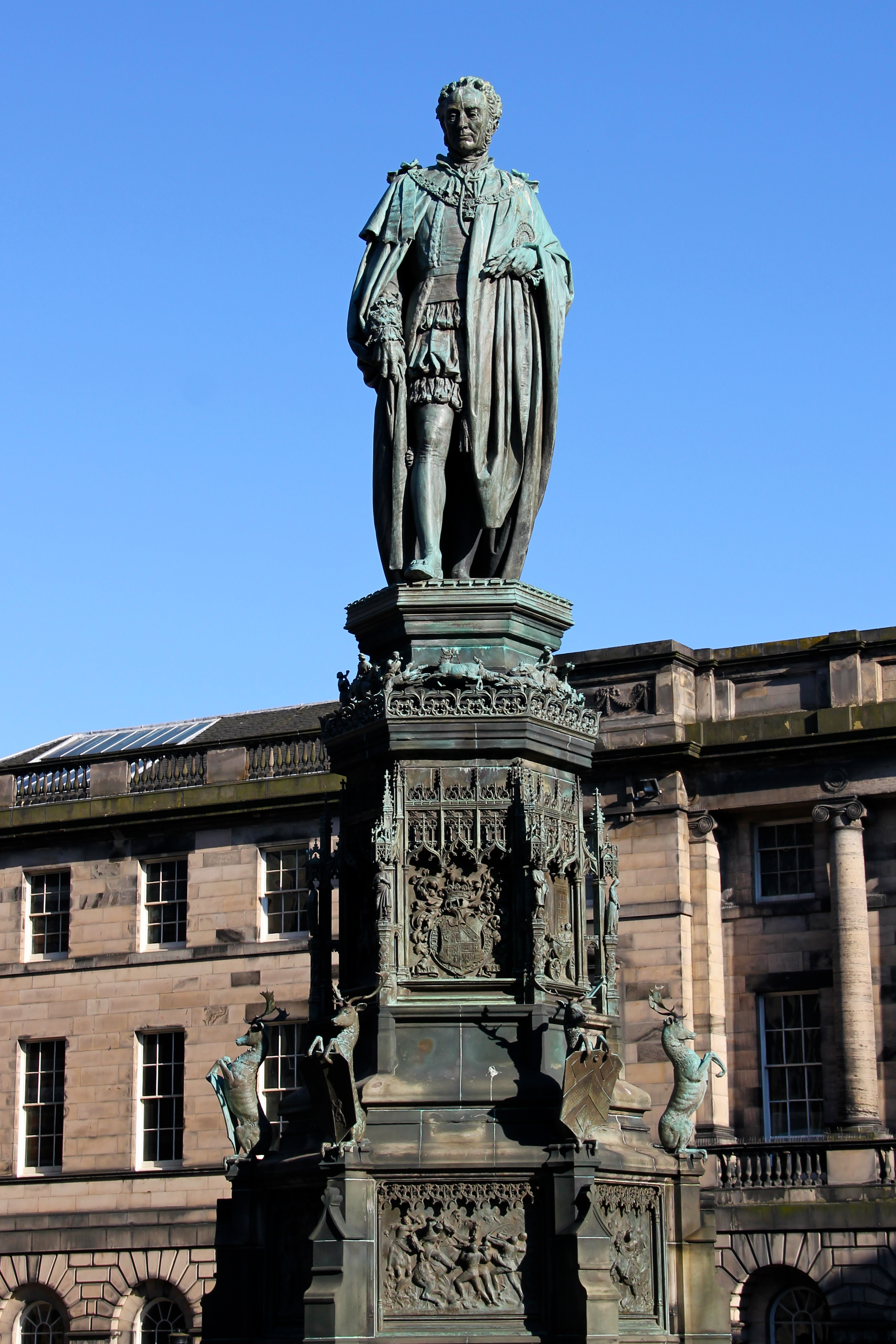
Statue of Walter Francis Montagu Douglas Scott, 5th Duke of Buccleuch, 7th Duke of Queensberry on the Parliament Square in Edinburgh

A great Scottish land magnate, Buccleuch was a Conservative in politics, and was appointed a Knight of the Garter in 1835 and a Privy Counsellor in 1842. He served as Lord Privy Seal from 1842 to 1846 and as Lord President of the Council from January to July 1846 in Peel's government, when he reluctantly supported Peel's decision to repeal the Corn Laws. After Peel's fall, the Duke's political career largely came to an end. In 1878 he became Chancellor of the University of Glasgow, a post he held until his death in 1884.

On 6 January 1842 he was appointed Colonel of the Edinburgh Militia (a regiment that his grandfather the 3rd Duke had raised in 1798). He was appointed an Aide-de-Camp to Queen Victoria for the militia on 19 March 1857. On resigning from the command on 20 May 1879 he was appointed the first Honorary Colonel of the Queen's Edinburgh Light Infantry Militia, as the regiment had by then become.

He joined the Canterbury Association on 20 May 1848. It was planned to build a town called Buccleuch in his honour near Alford Forest, but this did not eventuate.

== Family ==
Buccleuch married Lady Charlotte Anne Thynne, daughter of Thomas Thynne, 2nd Marquess of Bath and Hon. Isabella Elizabeth Byng, daughter of the 4th Viscount Torrington, on 13 August 1829 at St George's church, Hanover Square, London. The couple had four sons and three daughters:

- William Henry Walter Montagu Douglas Scott, 6th Duke of Buccleuch (9 September 1831 – 5 November 1914), succeeded and was the father of the 7th Duke of Buccleuch
- Lord Henry John Montagu Douglas Scott Montagu, 1st Baron Montagu of Beaulieu (5 November 1832 – 4 November 1905)
- Lord Walter Charles Montagu Douglas Scott (born 2 March 1834, died 3 March 1895)
- Admiral Lord Charles Thomas Montagu Douglas Scott (20 October 1839 – 21 August 1911)
- Lady Victoria Alexandrina Montagu Douglas Scott (20 November 1844 – 19 June 1938), married Schomberg Kerr, 9th Marquess of Lothian (1833–1900) and had issue; after his death she remarried in 1903 Bertram Chetwyn Talbot (1865–1936), son of John Gilbert Talbot. Through her first marriage, Victoria was the maternal grandmother of Elizabeth Varley.
- Lady Margaret Elizabeth Montagu Douglas Scott (10 October 1846 – 5 February 1918), married Donald Cameron of Lochiel and had issue
- Lady Mary Charlotte Montagu Douglas Scott (6 August 1851 – 13 December 1908), married Hon. Walter Trefusis and had issue

Under the terms of the couple's marriage settlement, £50,000 was set aside as a charge on the Buccleuch Settled Estates for the benefit of children of the union other than the oldest son; under the terms of the settlement, the Duke retained the right to determine how this £50,000 was to be apportioned amongst his offspring. When his third son Lord Walter Montagu-Douglas-Scott married in 1858, the Duke assigned £10,000 from this amount to Lord Walter, upon whom he also settled a separate sum of £40,000.

== Death ==
Buccleuch died at Bowhill House near Bowhill, Selkirkshire, in April 1884, aged 77, and was succeeded by his eldest son, William. He was buried in the family crypt of the Buccleuch Memorial Chapel in St. Mary's Episcopal Church, Dalkeith, Midlothian. The church is located on Dalkeith's High Street, at the entrance to Dalkeith Country Park.

== Ancestry ==
Ancestors of Walter Montagu-Douglas-Scott, 5th Duke of Buccleuch

8. Francis Scott, Earl of Dalkeith
4. Henry Scott, 3rd Duke of Buccleuch
9. Caroline Campbell, 1st Baroness Greenwich
2. Charles Montagu-Scott, 4th Duke of Buccleuch
10. George Montagu, 1st Duke of Montagu
5. Lady Elizabeth Montagu
11. Lady Mary Montagu
1. Walter Montagu Douglas Scott, 5th Duke of Buccleuch
12. Hon. Thomas Townshend
6. Thomas Townshend, 1st Viscount Sydney
13. Albina Selwyn
3. Hon. Harriet Katherine Townshend
14. Richard Powys MP
7. Elizabeth Powys
15. Lady Mary Brudenell

== See also ==
- Duke of Buccleuch's Hunt
- Duke of Buccleuch Collection
- James Scott, Duke of Monmouth
- Royal bastard

Political offices
Preceded by The Duke of Buckingham and Chandos	Lord Privy Seal; 1842–1846	Succeeded by The Earl of Haddington
Preceded by The Lord Wharncliffe	Lord President of the Council; 1846	Succeeded by The Marquess of Lansdowne
Honorary titles
Preceded by The Earl of Morton	Lord Lieutenant of Midlothian; 1828–1884	Succeeded by The Earl of Rosebery
Preceded by The Marquess of Lothian	Lord Lieutenant of Roxburghshire; 1841–1884	Succeeded by The Duke of Roxburghe
Academic offices
Preceded by Sir William Stirling-Maxwell	Chancellor of the University of Glasgow; 1878–1884	Succeeded by The Earl of Stair
Peerage of Scotland
Preceded by Charles William Henry Montagu Scott	Duke of Buccleuch; 2nd creation 1819–1884	Succeeded by William Henry Walter Montagu Douglas Scott
Preceded by Charles William Henry Montagu Scott	Duke of Queensberry; 1819–1884	Succeeded by William Henry Walter Montagu Douglas Scott
Professional and academic associations
Preceded by Creation	President of the Surtees Society; 1834–37	Succeeded by Edward Maltby
Professional and academic associations
Preceded by The Duke of Northumberland	President of the Surtees Society; 1865–84	Succeeded by William Stubbs
