= George Douglas, 16th Earl of Morton =

Scottish courtier

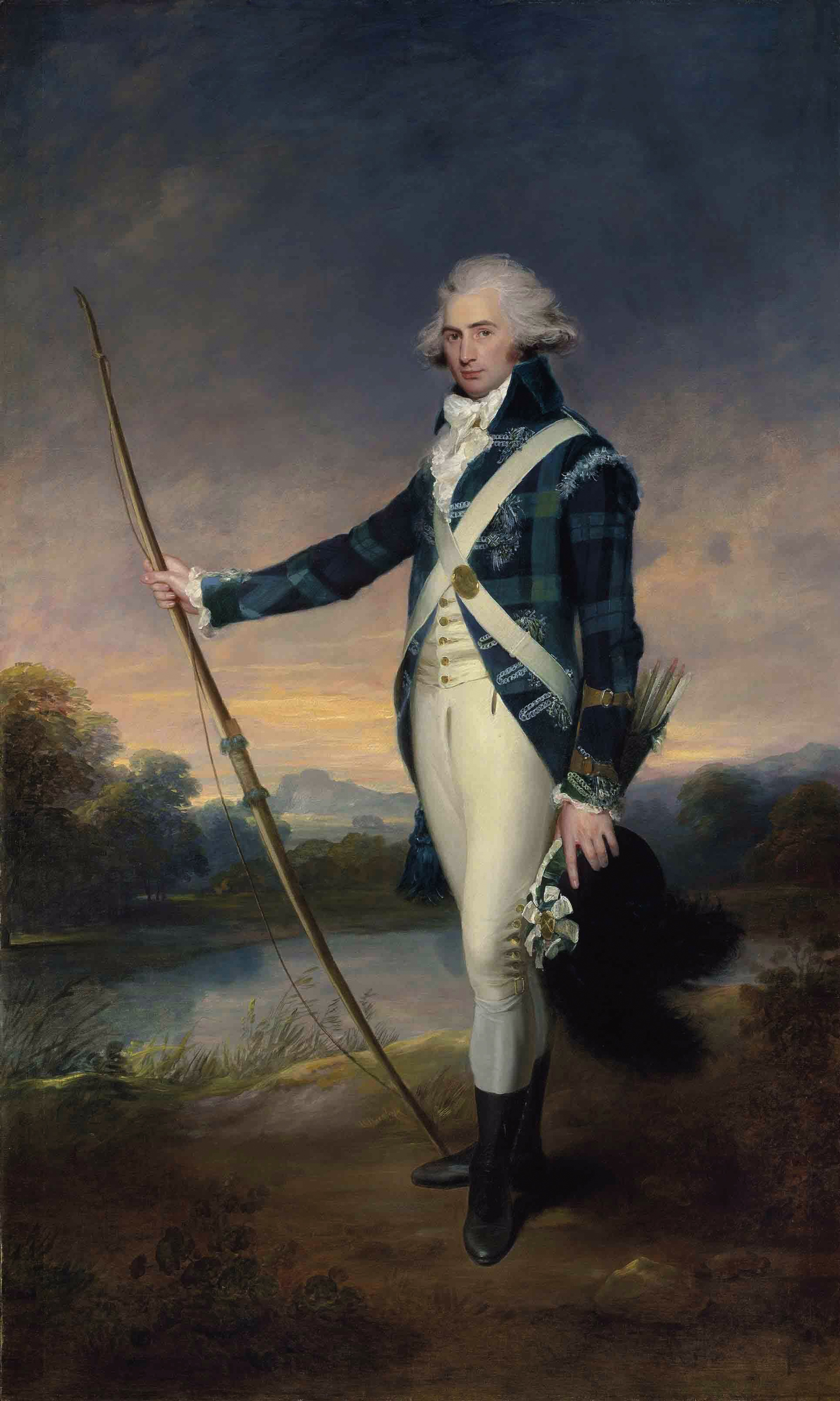
Portrait of Morton in the dress of the Royal Company of Archers in Holyrood Park by William Beechey

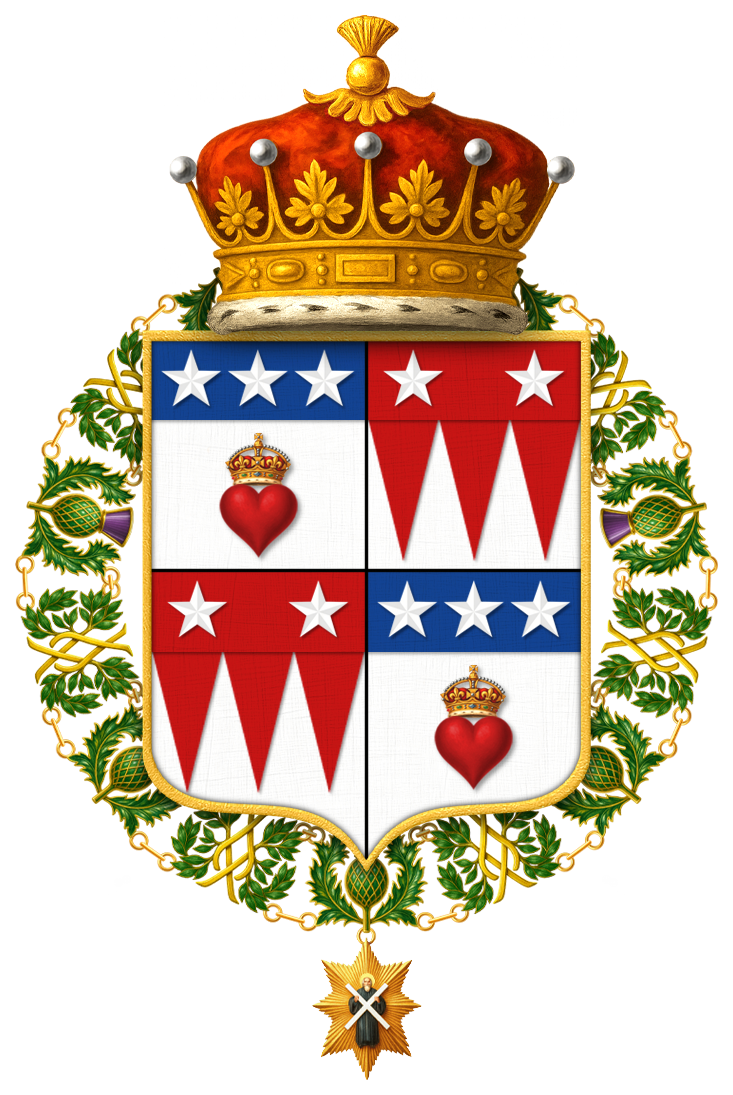
Shield of arms of George Douglas, 16th Earl of Morton, KT, FRS, FRSE, FSA

George Douglas, 16th Earl of Morton, KT, FRS, FRSE, FSA (3 April 1761 – 17 July 1827) was a Scottish courtier.

== Life ==
He was the son of Sholto Douglas, 15th Earl of Morton, and Katherine Hamilton. He succeeded to the title Earl of Morton in 1774 aged only thirteen, following the death of his father. He was sent to Eton College to be educated. Following his education he conducted a Grand Tour of Europe, as was the fashion of the day, and visited most of the European Courts.

He was elected a Fellow of the Royal Society in February 1785. His proposers were Daniel Rutherford, John Robison, and Alexander Keith. He served as vice-president of the Royal Society of London occasionally from 1795 to 1819, if Joseph Banks was unavailable.

The Earl was a frequent member of the Royal Company of Archers. Also, he had an interest in horse breeding and was noted for his attempts to breed a quagga.

He served as a representative peer from 1784 to 1790 and as Queen's Chamberlain 1792 to 1818. He was also Lord Lieutenant of Fife from 1808 to 1824. He was also Lord High Commissioner to the General Assembly of the Church of Scotland.

On 11 August 1791 he was created Baron Douglas of Loch Leven, in the County of Kinross. Thereafter he took a seat in the House of Lords between Lord Howard de Walden and Lord Walsingham. He was knighted at St. James's Palace in 1797 as a Knight of the Thistle.

During a debate in the House of Lords on 5 February 1807 over the proposed Slave Trade Act 1807, which would abolish British involvement in the Atlantic slave trade, he stated his opposition to the bill and "recommended to their lordships to pause, and to consider whether the abolition of the trade would not be attended with worse consequences in the view of humanity, than its continuation".

He died at the family estate of Dalmahoy House on 17 July 1827.

== Family ==
On 13 August 1814, he married Susan Elizabeth Buller (daughter of Sir Francis Buller). They had no children.

His illegitimate children included Georgiana Dods, and Walter Sholto Douglas, who were raised at Dalmahoy House and in London.

Douglas was succeeded in the earldom by his first cousin, George Sholto Douglas. The barony of Douglas of Loch Leven became extinct on his death.

== Freemasonry ==
Lord Morton was a Scottish Freemason. He was Initiated in Lodge Canongate Kilwinning, No. 2, on 30 November 1789. The source here cited states, incorrectly, that he was the 17th earl. Exactly one year later he was elected as Grand Master Mason of the Grand Lodge of Scotland.

During his term in office there were several notable events, one concerning politics. "It was declared by Grand Lodge, on 1 August [1791] that difference of political sentiments was to be no bar to Masonic fellowship, and that any Daughter Lodge guilty of excluding any Brother on that account merely would incur such censure as the Grand Lodge might at the time deem proper."

== See also ==
- Lord Morton’s mare, once thought to demonstrate telegony.

Masonic offices
Preceded by The Lord Napier	Grand Master of the Grand Lodge of Scotland; 1790–1792	Succeeded by Marquess of Huntly
Political offices
Preceded by The Earl of Ailesbury	Lord Chamberlain to Queen Charlotte; 1792–1818	Succeeded by None (death of Queen Charlotte)
Preceded by The Earl of Erroll	Lord High Commissioner; 1819–1824	Succeeded by The Lord Forbes
Honorary titles
Preceded by The Earl of Crawford	Lord Lieutenant of Fife; 1808–1824	Succeeded by The Earl of Kellie
Preceded by The Marquess of Lothian	Lord Lieutenant of Midlothian; 1824–1827	Succeeded by The Duke of Buccleuch
Peerage of Scotland
Preceded by Sholto Douglas	Earl of Morton; 1774–1827	Succeeded by George Douglas
Peerage of Great Britain
New creation	Baron Douglas of Lochleven; 1791–1827	Extinct
