= St David's Church, Dalkeith =

St David's Church
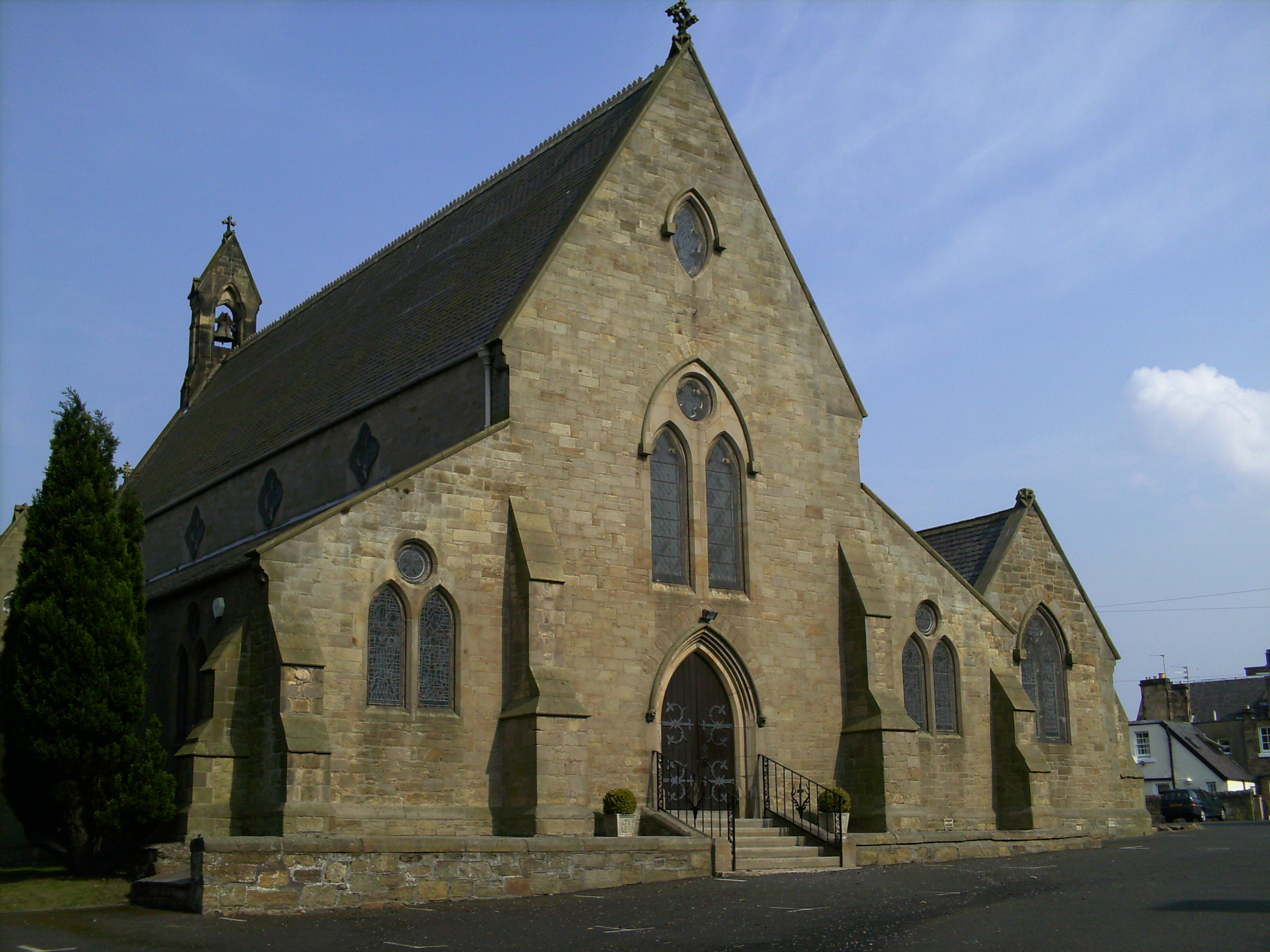
- Front entrance

- Location in Midlothian
- 55.8908°N 3.0758°W
- Location: Dalkeith, Midlothian
- Country: Scotland
- Denomination: Roman Catholic
- Website: StDavidsDalkeith.co.uk

History
- Status: Active
- Founded: 1853
- Founder: Cecil Chetwynd Kerr, Marchioness of Lothian
- Dedication: Saint David of Scotland

Architecture
- Functional status: Parish church
- Heritage designation: Category A listed
- Designated: 18 October 1976
- Architect: Joseph Hansom
- Groundbreaking: 1853
- Completed: 21 May 1854

Administration
- Province: St Andrews and Edinburgh
- Archdiocese: St Andrews and Edinburgh
- Deanery: St David's East and Midlothian

St David's Church is a Roman Catholic Parish church in Dalkeith, Midlothian, Scotland. It was founded in 1854 by Cecil Chetwynd Kerr, Marchioness of Lothian. It was designed by Joseph Hansom and is a category A listed building.

== History ==
Cecil Chetwynd Kerr, Marchioness of Lothian was a follower of the Oxford Movement. Her spiritual advisor John Henry Newman was a leading thinker in the group. She had built St John's church in Jedburgh for the Episcopalian church. After she converted to Catholicism in 1851, Lady Lothian decided to build a church for the Catholic population in Dalkeith. Joseph Hansom was the church architect and building started in 1853. On 21 May 1854, the church opened and a Fr Mackay was the first parish priest. In 1858, he was replaced by a Fr J. S. McCorry. In 1860, Lady Lothian invited the Society of Jesus to serve the parish.

The church's founder died on a religious visit to Rome in 1877, but her body was buried in this church at the foot of the altar.

In 1944, the Jesuits left the parish and handed over administration of the church to the Archdiocese of St Andrews and Edinburgh who continue to serve the congregation.

== Parish ==
The church has two Sunday Masses. There is one at 6:00pm on Saturday evening, the other is at 11:00am on Sunday morning. There are weekday Masses at 9:00am on Tuesday, Thursday and Friday.

Also in the parish is the St Luke and St Anne Church in Mayfield, Midlothian. It was founded in 1948 and the church was built in 1971. There is a Sunday Mass there at 9:30am on Sunday morning. There are weekday Masses at 9:00am on Monday and Wednesday.

The church has a relationship with St David's School. It was opened in 1854. In 1876, the Sisters of Mercy came from St. Catherine’s Convent in Edinburgh to take over the teaching. In 1940, they left the school. In 1966, part of the Loreto School in Musselburgh was moved to St David’s.

== See also ==
- Society of Jesus
