= William Kerr, 6th Marquess of Lothian =

British soldier, landowner and politician (1763–1824)

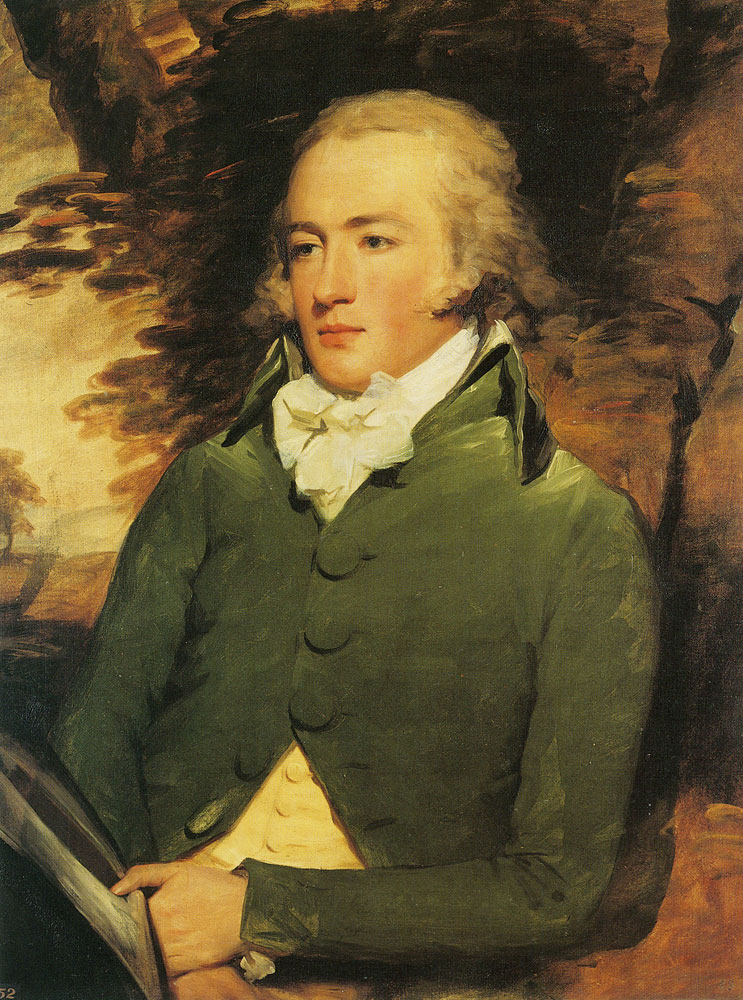
William Kerr, 6th Marquess of Lothian (Henry Raeburn, late 1780s)

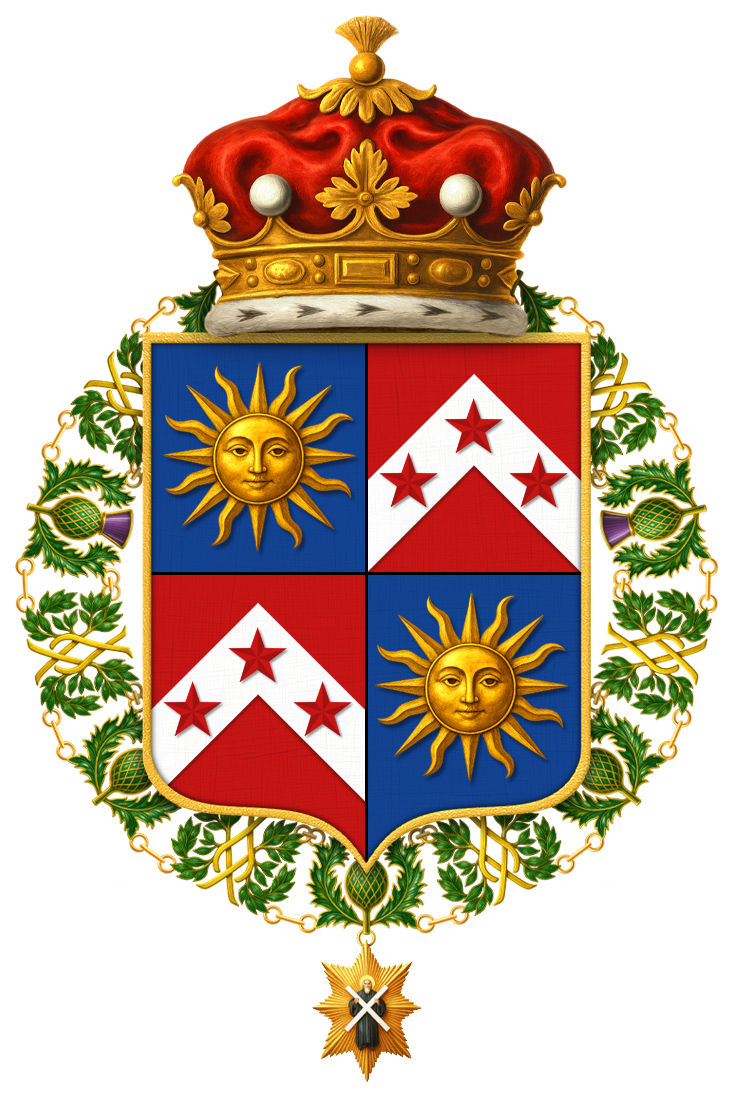
Shield of Arms of William Kerr, 6th Marquess of Lothian, KT, FRSE

William Kerr, 6th Marquess of Lothian, KT, FRSE (4 October 1763 – 27 April 1824), was a British soldier, landowner and politician. He was the son of William Kerr, 5th Marquess of Lothian. He served as a representative peer from 1817 to 1824.

== Life ==
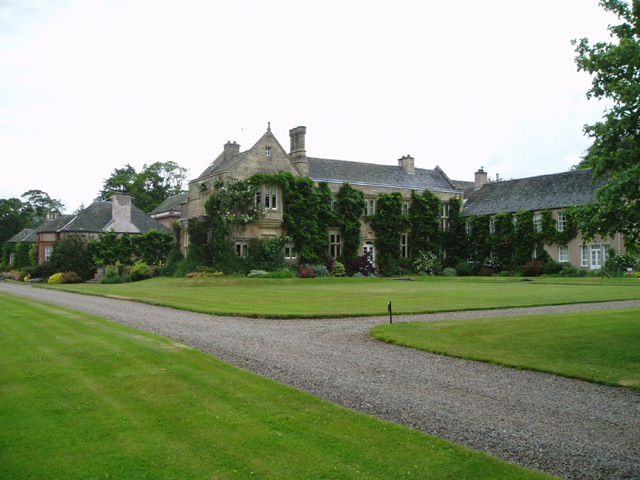
Monteviot House

Kerr was born on 4 October 1763, the son of the then Lord Newbattle and Elizabeth Fortescue. When he was five he was the subject of several pictures with his sister, executed by Valentine Green as mezzotints for publication.

He was educated at the University of Edinburgh. In 1786 he was elected a Fellow of the Royal Society of Edinburgh; his proposers were Dugald Stewart, James Hutton and John Robison.

He was Lord Lieutenant of Roxburghshire from 1812 and of Midlothian from 1819. He served as Colonel of the Edinburgh Militia from 25 March 1811 until his death.

He was created a Knight of the Thistle in 1820 and Baron of Kersheugh in 1821.

He lived in the family home of Monteviot House near Jedburgh.

Kerr died in Richmond, Surrey, on 27 April 1824.

== Family ==
He married, firstly, Lady Harriet Hobart, a daughter of John Hobart, 2nd Earl of Buckinghamshire (and the divorced wife of Armar Lowry-Corry, 1st Earl Belmore), on 14 April 1793. They had four children:

- John Kerr, 7th Marquess of Lothian (1794–1841)
- Lord Schomberg Robert (1795–1825), soldier, died unmarried.
- Lady Isabella Emily Caroline (1797–1858), died unmarried.
- Lord Henry Francis Charles (1800–1882), religious minister, married Louisa Hope, a daughter of Sir Alexander Hope.

His first wife died in 1805 and on 1 December 1806, at Dalkeith House, he married Lady Harriet Scott, a daughter of Henry Scott, 3rd Duke of Buccleuch. They had eight children:

- Lady Elizabeth Georgiana Kerr (1807–1871), married Charles Trefusis, 19th Baron Clinton. They were the parents of Charles Hepburn-Stuart-Forbes-Trefusis, 20th Baron Clinton and Mark Rolle; the maternal grandparents of George Windsor-Clive and Mark Carpenter-Garnier; and great-grandparents of Thomas Coke, 5th Earl of Leicester.
- Lady Harriet Louise Anne (1808–1884), married Sir John Stuart Hepburn Forbes, 8th Baronet. They were the maternal grandparents of Charles Hepburn-Stuart-Forbes-Trefusis, 21st Baron Clinton.
- Lady Frances (1810–1863), married George Wade.
- Lady Anne Katherine (1812–1829), died unmarried.
- Lord Charles Lennox (1814–1898), soldier, married Charlotte Hanmer, a daughter of Sir Thomas Hanmer, 2nd Baronet.
- Lord Mark Ralph George (1817–1900), soldier, died unmarried.
- Lord Frederick Herbert (1818–1896), admiral, married Emily Maitland, a daughter of Sir Peregrine Maitland.
- Lady Georgiana Augusta (1821–1859), married Rev. Granville Forbes.

Honorary titles
Preceded by Henry Scott, 3rd Duke of Buccleuch	Lord Lieutenant of Roxburghshire; 1812–1824	Succeeded by John Kerr, 7th Marquess of Lothian
Preceded by Charles Montagu-Scott, 4th Duke of Buccleuch	Lord Lieutenant of Midlothian; 1819–1824	Succeeded by George Douglas, 16th Earl of Morton
Masonic offices
Preceded by Marquess of Huntly	Grand Master of the Grand Lodge of Scotland; 1794–1796	Succeeded by Lord Doune
Peerage of Scotland
Preceded by William Kerr	Marquess of Lothian; 1815–1824	Succeeded by John Kerr
Peerage of the United Kingdom
New creation	Baron Ker; 1821–1824	Succeeded by John Kerr
