= Lord Lieutenant of Midlothian =

Ceremonial officer in Midlothian, Scotland

This is a list of people who have served as Lord Lieutenant of Midlothian (also known as Edinburghshire).

- Henry Scott, 3rd Duke of Buccleuch 17 March 1794 – 11 January 1812
- Charles Montagu-Scott, 4th Duke of Buccleuch 25 January 1812 – 20 April 1819
- William Kerr, 6th Marquess of Lothian 8 June 1819 – 27 April 1824
- George Douglas, 16th Earl of Morton 2 June 1824 – 17 July 1827
- Walter Montagu-Douglas-Scott, 5th Duke of Buccleuch 3 January 1828 – 16 April 1884
- Archibald Primrose, 5th Earl of Rosebery 17 May 1884 – 21 May 1929
- Harry Primrose, 6th Earl of Rosebery 8 October 1929 – 1964
- Sir Maxwell Inglis, 9th Baronet 4 June 1964 – 1972
- Sir John Dutton Clerk, 10th Baronet 11 July 1972 – 1992
- Capt. George Burnett† 31 January 1992 – 2003
- Patrick Prenter 23 August 2003 – 18 October 2013
- Sir Robert Maxwell Clerk, 11th Baronet 18 October 2013 – 3 April 2020 (Vice Lord-Lieutenant from 2011)
- Lt. Col. Richard Callander 3 April 2020 – 2 April 2025
- Sarah Barron 2 April 2025 - Present

† Known as Lord-Lieutenant in Lothian Region (Midlothian District) until 1996.

== Deputy Lieutenants ==
- John Borthwick 1832
- Archibald Hope the Younger 1832
- Major Robert Dundas 23 February 1901
- Major Robert Gordon Gordon-Gilmour 23 February 1901
- Colonel Robert George Wardlaw Ramsay 23 February 1901

For the City of Edinburgh see List of Lord Provosts of Edinburgh
