= John Kerr, 7th Marquess of Lothian =

British politician (1794–1841)

The Most Honourable The Marquess of Lothian PC
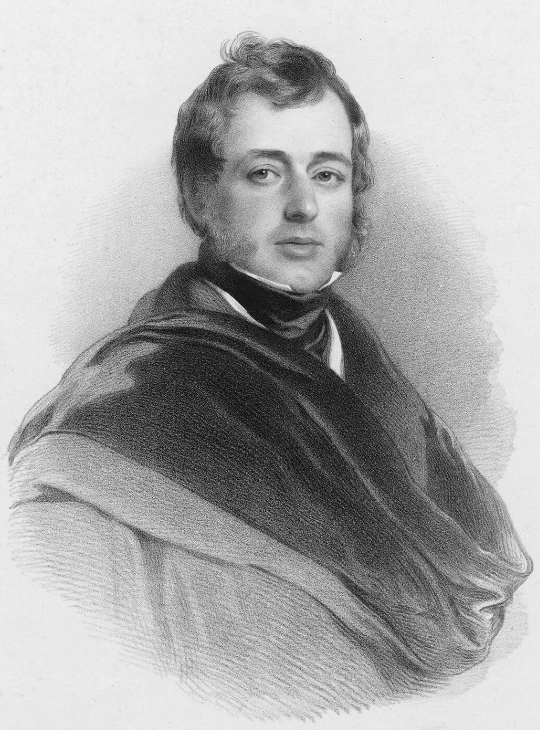

Captain of the Yeomen of the Guard
- In office 8 September 1841 – 14 November 1841
- Monarch: Victoria
- Prime Minister: Sir Robert Peel, Bt
- Preceded by: The Earl of Surrey
- Succeeded by: The Earl of Beverley

Personal details
- Born: 1 February 1794
- Died: 14 November 1841 (aged 47)
- Party: Tory
- Spouse: Lady Cecil Chetwynd-Talbot (1808–1877)
- Children: 7, including Schomberg and Walter
- Parents: William Kerr, 6th Marquess of Lothian (father); Lady Harriet Hobart (mother)

John William Robert Kerr, 7th Marquess of Lothian PC (1 February 1794 – 14 November 1841), styled Lord Newbottle until 1815 and Earl of Ancram from 1815 to 1824, was a Tory politician. He served briefly as Captain of the Yeomen of the Guard under Sir Robert Peel between September and November 1841.

== Background ==
Kerr was the eldest son of William Kerr, 6th Marquess of Lothian, and his first wife Lady Harriet, daughter of John Hobart, 2nd Earl of Buckinghamshire. Styled Lord Newbottle from birth, he became known by the courtesy title Earl of Ancram when his father succeeded to the marquessate in 1815.

== Career ==
Lord Ancram entered the House of Commons in 1820 as one of two representatives for Huntingdon, a seat he held until he succeeded his father in the marquessate in 1824. He also succeeded his father as Colonel of the Edinburgh Militia, a position that he held until his own death. In September 1841 he was sworn of the Privy Council and appointed Captain of the Yeomen of the Guard in the Tory administration of Sir Robert Peel, a post he held until his early death in November of the same year. He also served as Lord-Lieutenant of Roxburghshire between 1824 and 1841.

== Family ==
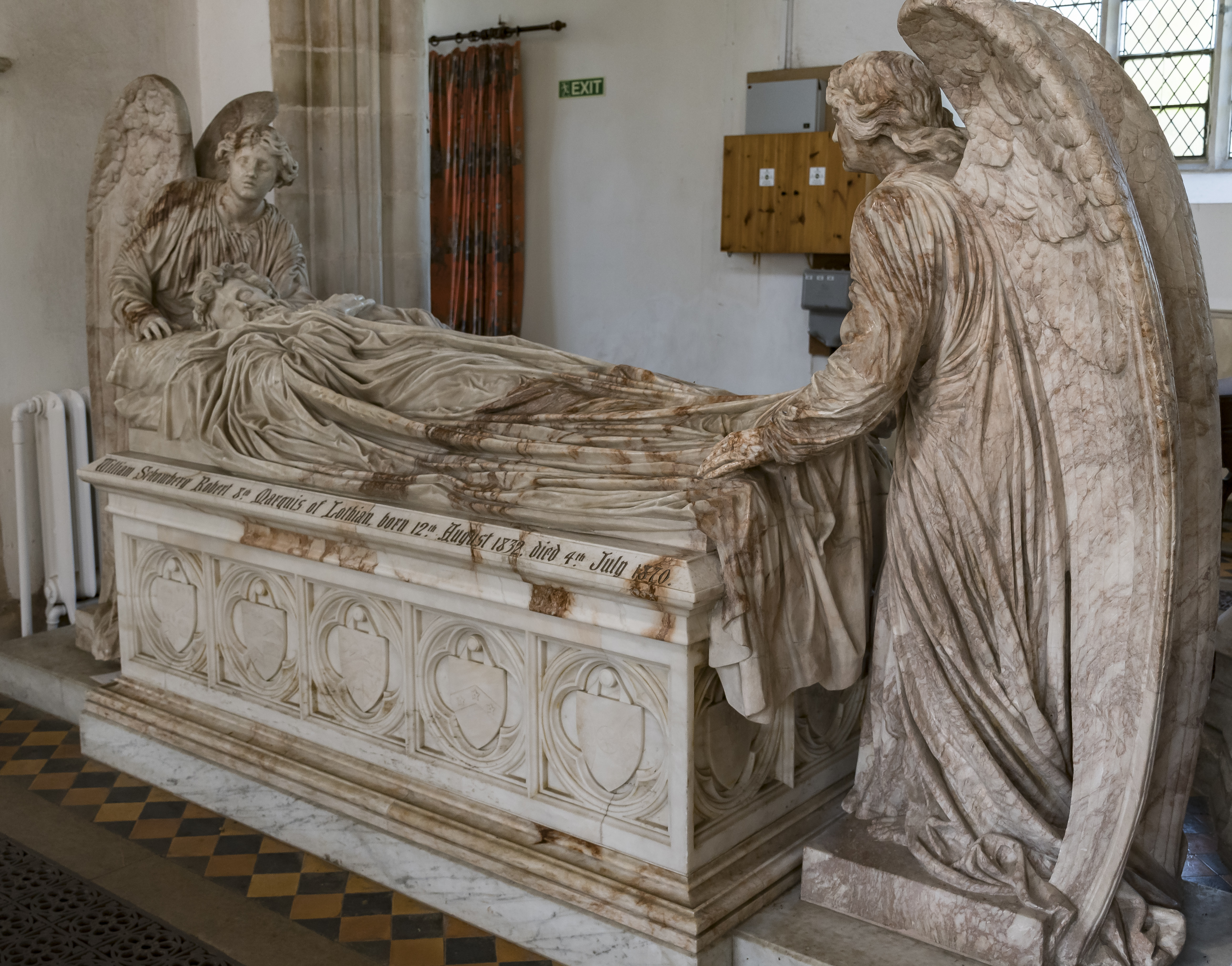
Monument and effigy of William Schomberg Robert Kerr, 8th Earl of Lothian (1832–1870), Blickling Church, Norfolk, sculpted by George Frederick Watts

Lord Lothian married Lady Cecil Chetwynd-Talbot, daughter of Charles Chetwynd-Talbot, 2nd Earl Talbot, in 1831. They had five sons and two daughters. Their two elder sons, William and Schomberg, both succeeded in the title. Their third son Lord Ralph Kerr became a major-general in the army and was the father of Philip Kerr, 11th Marquess of Lothian, while their fourth son Lord Walter Kerr became an admiral in the Royal Navy and was the grandfather of Peter Kerr, 12th Marquess of Lothian, and great-grandfather of Michael Kerr, 13th Marquess of Lothian. Lord Lothian died in November 1841, aged 47. After his death, the Marchioness converted to Catholicism with her two younger sons, Lord Ralph Kerr and Lord Walter Kerr, and her daughters. The Marchioness of Lothian died in May 1877, aged 69.

Parliament of the United Kingdom
| Preceded by John Calvert; William Augustus Montagu | Member of Parliament for Huntingdon; 1820–1824; With: John Calvert | Succeeded by John Calvert; James Stuart |
Political offices
| Preceded by The Earl of Surrey | Captain of the Yeomen of the Guard; September–November 1841 | Succeeded by The Earl of Beverley |
Honorary titles
| Preceded by The Marquess of Lothian | Lord-Lieutenant of Roxburghshire; 1824–1841 | Succeeded by The Duke of Buccleuch |
Peerage of Scotland
| Preceded by William Kerr | Marquess of Lothian; 1824–1841 | Succeeded by William Kerr |
