= Cecil Chetwynd Kerr, Marchioness of Lothian =

British aristocrat and Catholic convert

Cecil Kerr
- Marchioness of Lothian
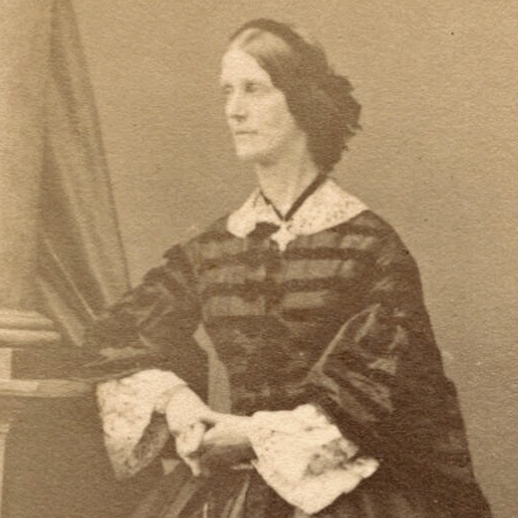
- Born: 17 April 1808; Ingestre Hall, Staffordshire
- Died: 13 May 1877 (aged 69); Rome, Italy
- Spouse: John Kerr, 7th Marquess of Lothian
- Issue: 7
- Father: Charles Chetwynd-Talbot, 2nd Earl Talbot
- Mother: Frances Thomasine

Cecil Chetwynd Kerr, Marchioness of Lothian (née Lady Cecil Chetwynd-Talbot; 17 April 1808 – 13 May 1877) was a British noblewoman and philanthropist who founded the Anglican Saint John's Church in Jedburgh and the Catholic Saint David's Church in Dalkeith. A follower of the Oxford Movement, she eventually converted from Anglicanism to Catholicism after she was widowed.

== Life ==
Kerr was born in the family seat of Ingestre Hall in Staffordshire. She was one of twelve children. Her parents were Frances Thomasine and Charles Chetwynd-Talbot, 2nd Earl Talbot. She was the sixth child and her mother died shortly after the birth of the twelfth child. Her father took an interest in her education and ensured she was well-read and that she had an understanding of their religion.

Kerr married on 12 July 1831 and went to live in Scotland with her husband John Kerr, 7th Marquess of Lothian. Her favourite home was near Jedburgh at Monteviot House, but the family seat was Newbattle Abbey. She moved to Monteviot in 1840 in order to attend her nearest Scottish Episcopal church which was in Kelso. Her husband died at another estate in Norfolk in 1841 after they had seven children. She took an increasing interest in the religious Oxford Movement who argued that Anglicanism needed to reintroduce aspects of Catholicism into their high church practices. The followers were known as Tractarianists and her spiritual advisor John Henry Newman was a leading thinker in the group.

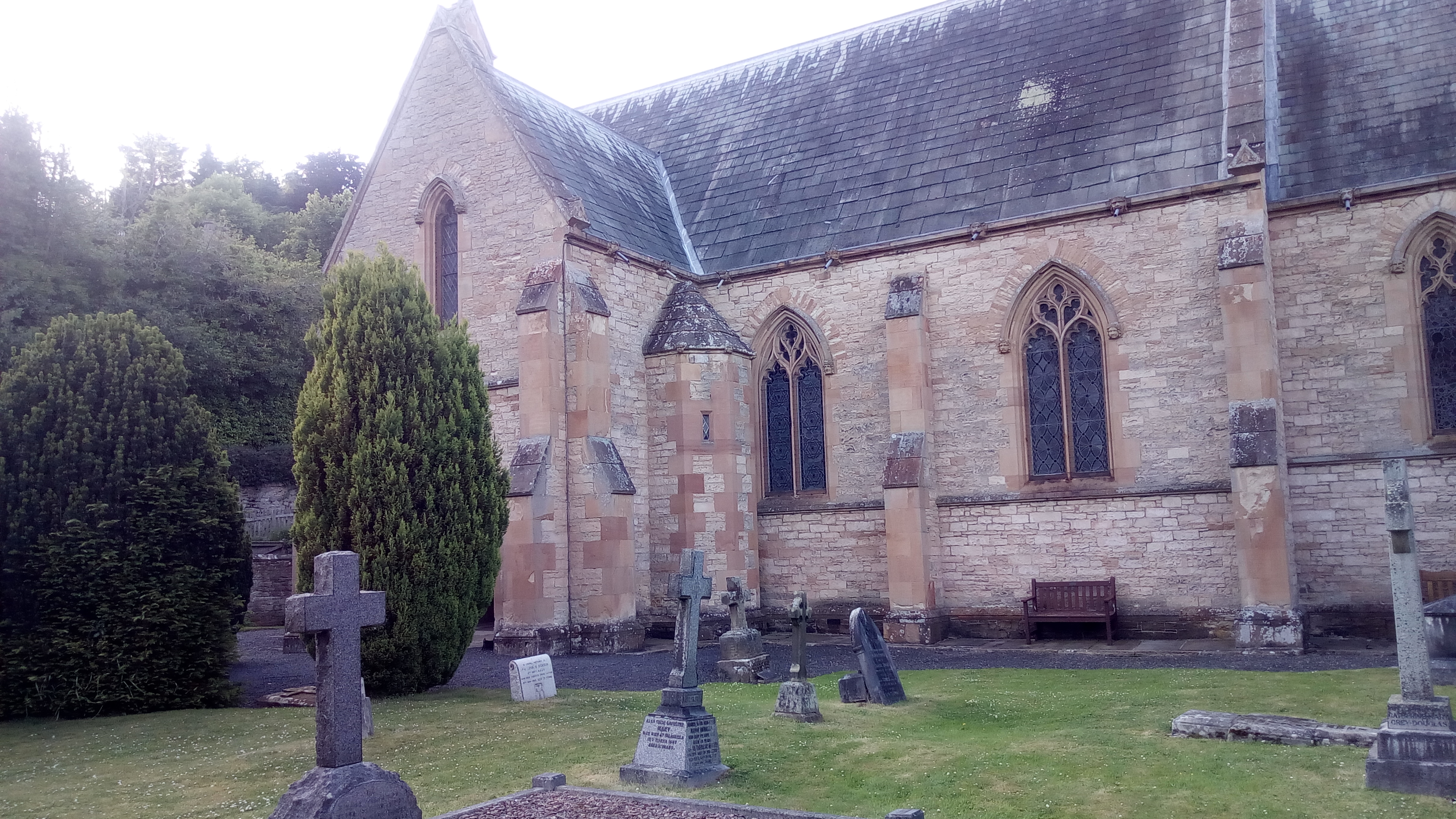
She founded St John's church in Jedburgh

Kerr funded the creation of an Anglican church St John's in Jedburgh near Monteviot. The church was consecrated on 15 August 1843. The church was opened with invited speakers, a full choir and services that took several days. Two years later Newman became a Catholic and in 1851 Kerr under Henry Edward Manning's instruction also converted to Catholicism.

Kerr's good works continued when she was in London where she was friends with the writer Lady Georgiana Fullerton and Margaret, countess of Newburgh who were both aristocratic Catholic converts.

Her children were now in jeopardy as discrimination under British law against Catholics was legally required. She was only one of the guardians of her children and the others were going to interfere as they were concerned that she may convert them. Kerr did in fact smuggle her children to Edinburgh where they were received into the Catholic faith. Her eldest son was away at Oxford University and he remained an Anglican.

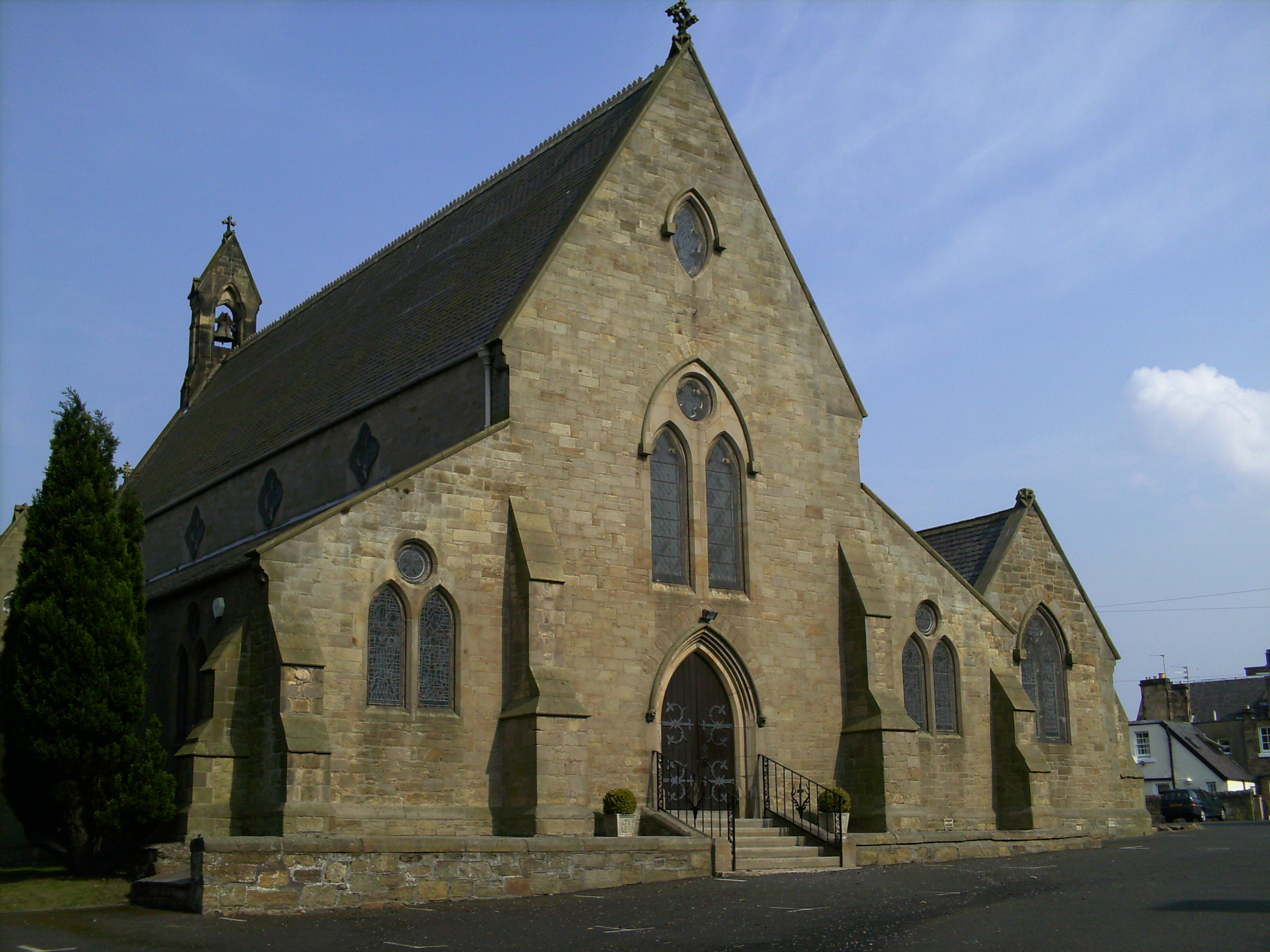
She also founded St. David's Church in Dalkeith

Kerr built a new, and now listed, St. David's Church in Dalkeith. She befriended Charlotte Montagu Douglas Scott, Duchess of Buccleuch who would in time also convert, in 1860. She and Charlotte paid for charitable work in Edinburgh, and Kerr's daughter, (also) Cecil, became a nun.

Kerr died on one of her frequent trips to Rome in 1877, but she was buried within her church in Dalkeith at the foot of the altar. The altar was commissioned that year by her son Walter.

== Arms ==
Coat of arms of Cecil Chetwynd Kerr, Marchioness of Lothian
Escutcheon John Kerr, 7th Marquess of Lothian (Quarterly 1st & 4th Azure the sun in splendour Proper 2nd & 3rd Gules on a chevron Argent three mullets of the field) impaling Charles Chetwynd-Tablot, 2nd Earl Talbot (Gules a lion rampant within a bordure engrailed Or a crescent for difference).

== Ancestry ==
Ancestry of Cecil Chetwynd Kerr, Marchioness of Lothian

8. Charles Talbot, 1st Baron Talbot
4. John Chetwynd-Talbot, 1st Earl Talbot
9. Catherine Chetwynd, Baroness Talbot
2. Charles Chetwynd-Talbot, 2nd Earl Talbot
10. Wills Hill, 1st Marquess of Downshire
5. Charlotte Hill, Countess Talbot
11. Margaretta FitzGerald, Marchioness of Downshire
1. Cecil Chetwynd Kerr, Marchioness of Lothian
12. Gustavas William Lambart, MP
6. Charles Lambart
13. Lady Thomasine Rochfort
3. Lady Frances Thomasine Lambart, Countess Talbot
14. James Lenox Naper Dutton
7. Frances Dutton
15. Jane Bond
