= Fortune FitzRoy, Duchess of Grafton =

British Mistress of the Robes (1920–2021)

Her Grace The Duchess of Grafton GCVO JP
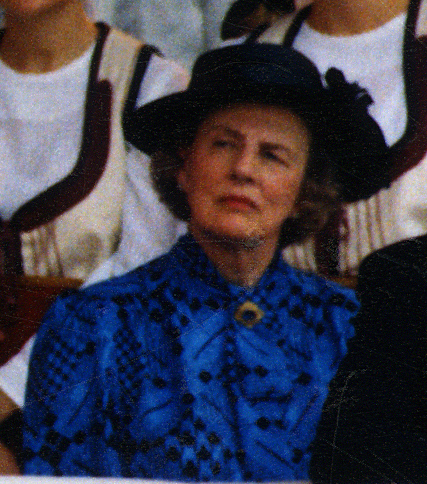
- The Duchess in Brisbane in 1988

Mistress of the Robes
- In office 1967–2021
- Monarch: Elizabeth II
- Preceded by: The Dowager Duchess of Devonshire
- Succeeded by: Vacant

Personal details
- Born: Ann Fortune Smith; 24 February 1920 Lower Ashfold, Slaugham, Surrey, England
- Died: 3 December 2021 (aged 101) London, England
- Spouse: The 11th Duke of Grafton (m. 1946; died 2011)
- Children: 5, including James, Earl of Euston

Ann Fortune FitzRoy, Duchess of Grafton, GCVO, JP (née Smith; 24 February 1920 – 3 December 2021), was a British courtier who served as Mistress of the Robes to Queen Elizabeth II from 1967 until her death in 2021. She was the wife of the 11th Duke of Grafton, and grandmother of the 12th Duke of Grafton.

== Early life and family ==
She was born on 24 February 1920 to Captain Evan Cadogan Eric Smith MC, of Lower Ashfold, Slaugham, Sussex, and his wife Beatrice Helen (née Williams). Her father was chairman of National Provincial Bank and Rolls-Royce. By birth, she was a member of the Smith banking family and a descendant of Oswald Smith of Blendon Hall, Kent, and thereby a second cousin once removed of Queen Elizabeth the Queen Mother and a fourth cousin of Sir Oswald Mosley. Fortune had three brothers: Sir John Smith, a Conservative MP, banker and founder of the Landmark Trust; Jeremy Fox Eric Smith; and Mark Smith, an eye specialist. She was an aunt of Serena Soames, Baroness Soames of Fletching (second wife of Lord Soames of Fletching), and of Dione, Countess of Verulam.

Smith trained as a nurse at the Great Ormond Street Hospital. She was presented as a debutante at court during the 1938 season.

== Marriage and children ==
On 12 October 1946, she married the then Earl of Euston – later the 11th Duke of Grafton – at St Mary's Church, Slaugham. The couple had first met at a ball at Euston Hall. They had five children:

- James Oliver Charles FitzRoy, Earl of Euston (13 December 1947 – 1 October 2009). He married Lady Clare Amabel Margaret Kerr on 16 September 1972 and had five children, including Henry FitzRoy, 12th Duke of Grafton.
- Lady Henrietta Fortune Doreen FitzRoy (born 14 September 1949). She married Edward Gerald Patrick St. George (1928–2004) in 1979, had issue.
- Lady Virginia Mary Elizabeth FitzRoy (born 10 April 1954). Goddaughter of Queen Elizabeth II. She married Lord Ralph William Francis Joseph Kerr, 14th Marquess of Lothian (born 1957), second son of Peter Kerr, 12th Marquess of Lothian, on 6 September 1980; they were divorced in 1987, no issue. Married, secondly, Roger Babington Hill in 1995, no issue.
- Lord Charles Patrick Hugh FitzRoy (born 7 January 1957), who married Diana Miller-Stirling, and has two sons.
- Lady Olivia Rose Mildred FitzRoy (born 1 August 1963), who married Guy Monson, an investment funds manager, and has two daughters, Olivia and Leonora.

In 1970, Hugh FitzRoy, Earl of Euston, succeeded his father after his death as 11th Duke of Grafton, whereupon she became known as the Duchess of Grafton. The Duke died in April 2011, and Fortune became the Dowager Duchess of Grafton. Her husband was succeeded as duke by their grandson, Henry FitzRoy, Viscount Ipswich, since their elder son died in 2009. She turned 100 in February 2020 and died in London on 3 December 2021, at the age of 101.

== Royal service ==
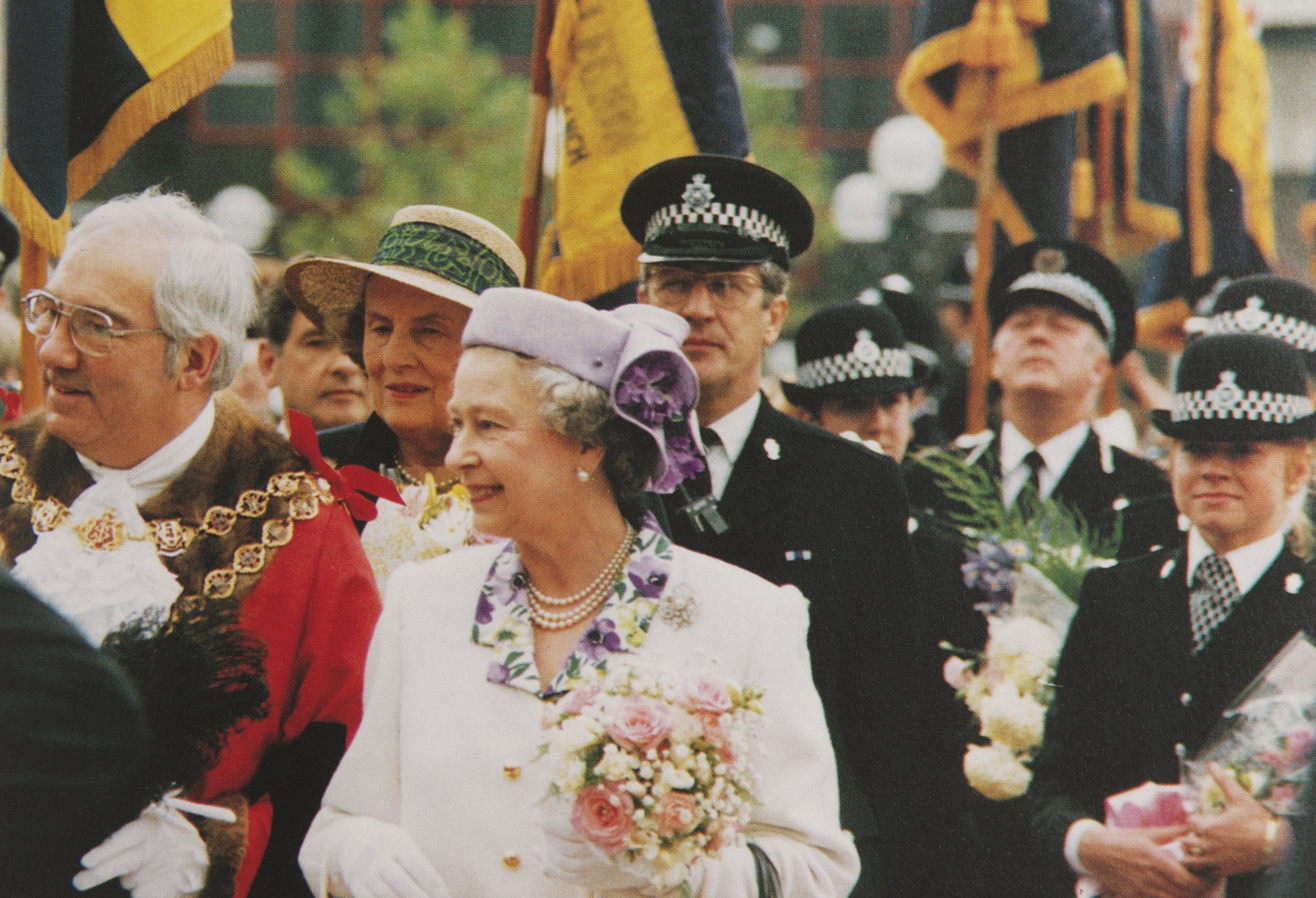
The Duchess, behind the Queen, in Birmingham, 1991

She was a Lady of the Bedchamber to Queen Elizabeth II between 1953 and 1966, being appointed shortly before the coronation, and served as Mistress of the Robes from 1967 until her death in 2021. She accompanied the Queen on numerous overseas visits including Nigeria in 1956, France in 1972, Morocco in 1980 and Russia in 1994.

The Duchess, when Countess of Euston, was appointed a Commander of the Royal Victorian Order (CVO) in the 1965 New Year Honours, she was later promoted to a Dame Commander (DCVO) in the 1970 New Year Honours and a Dame Grand Cross (GCVO) in the 1980 Birthday Honours.

She was appointed a magistrate in the London juvenile courts in 1949, the youngest female magistrate at the time, and served as Justice of the Peace for West Sussex between 1972 and 1990. She was involved with many local charities in East Anglia such as the local branches of the British Heart Foundation and the Royal British Legion's Women's Division.

== Honours ==
Country	Date	Appointment	Ribbon	Post-nominal letters	Notes
United Kingdom	31 December 1964	Commander of the Royal Victorian Order		CVO	Promoted to DCVO in 1969
United Kingdom	31 December 1969	Dame Commander of the Royal Victorian Order		DCVO	Promoted to GCVO in 1980
United Kingdom	15 June 1980	Dame Grand Cross of the Royal Victorian Order		GCVO	
United Kingdom	2 June 1953	Queen Elizabeth II Coronation Medal			
United Kingdom	6 February 1977	Queen Elizabeth II Silver Jubilee Medal			
United Kingdom	6 February 2002	Queen Elizabeth II Golden Jubilee Medal			
United Kingdom	6 February 2012	Queen Elizabeth II Diamond Jubilee Medal			

Court offices
Preceded by The Dowager Duchess of Devonshire	Mistress of the Robes to Queen Elizabeth II; 1967–2021	Succeeded by —
