= Hugh FitzRoy, 11th Duke of Grafton =

British peer (1919–2011)

His Grace The Duke of Grafton KG DL
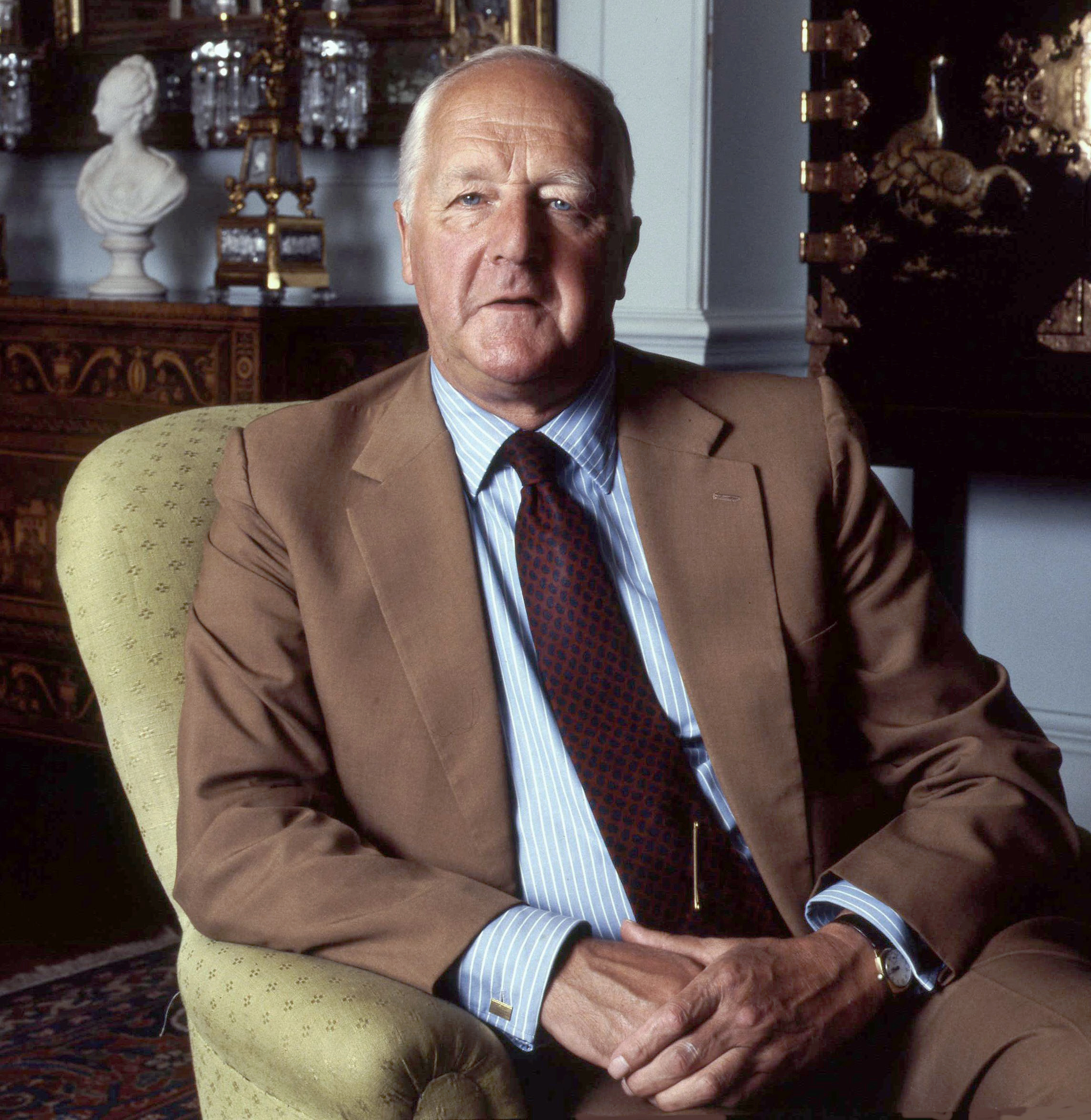

Member of the House of Lords
- In office 11 November 1970 – 11 November 1999
- Preceded by: Charles FitzRoy, 10th Duke of Grafton
- Succeeded by: seat abolished

Personal details
- Born: Hugh Denis Charles FitzRoy; 3 April 1919 Cape Town, Union of South Africa
- Died: 7 April 2011 (aged 92) Euston Hall, Euston, Suffolk, England
- Spouse: Ann Fortune Smith (m. 1946)
- Children: James FitzRoy, Earl of Euston; Lady Henrietta St. George; Lady Virginia FitzRoy; Lord Charles FitzRoy; Lady Olivia Monson
- Parent(s): Charles FitzRoy, 10th Duke of Grafton; Lady Doreen Buxton
- Education: Magdalene College, Cambridge

Military service
- Allegiance: United Kingdom
- Branch/service: British Army
- Unit: Grenadier Guards

Hugh Denis Charles FitzRoy, 11th Duke of Grafton (3 April 1919 – 7 April 2011) was the son of Charles FitzRoy, 10th Duke of Grafton, and his first wife Lady Doreen Maria Josepha Sydney Buxton, second daughter of Sydney Buxton, 1st Earl Buxton. He was known from 1936 to 1970 as Earl of Euston.

== Life and career ==
He was born in 1919 in Cape Town, Union of South Africa. He is one of the hundreds of descendants of Charles II of England. He descends through Henry FitzRoy, 1st Duke of Grafton born to the King's mistress Barbara Villiers. Charles had many children but none legitimate; at his death, the crown passed to his brother, a Catholic who was deposed and whose progeny were excluded on that basis, save for his two daughters raised as Protestants. The House of Stuart thereafter gave way to their distant cousins, the House of Hanover.

Through the Duke's ancestor Anne Warren, a daughter of Admiral Sir Peter Warren, he is a descendant of the Schuyler family, the Van Cortlandt family, and the Delancey family, all from British North America.

The Duke was educated at Eton College and at Magdalene College, Cambridge. He was subsequently commissioned into the Grenadier Guards, and for three years from 1943 was Aide-de-camp to the Viceroy of India, Field Marshal Viscount Wavell.

The Duke of Grafton devoted much of his life to the conservation and protection of historic buildings. He was chairman and later president of the Society for the Protection of Ancient Buildings, and also chaired at various times the Historic Churches Preservation Trust, the Architectural Heritage Fund, the Church of England's Cathedral Advisory Commission and Sir John Soane's Museum.

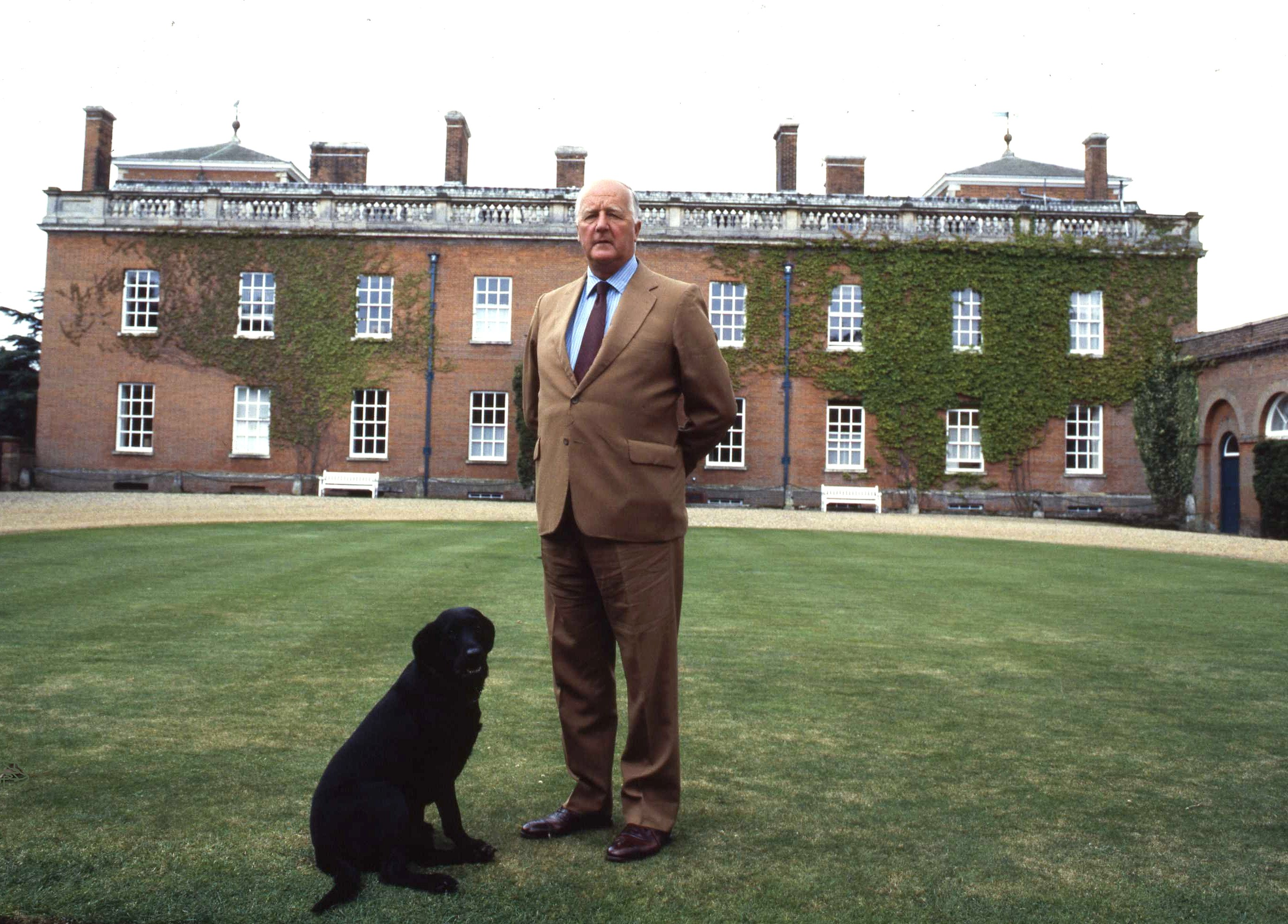
The 11th Duke of Grafton outside Euston Hall

The Duke was a member of the Historic Buildings Council from its foundation in 1953, and until he succeeded his father as duke in 1970, he was the National Trust's administrator for Sussex and Kent, and later East Anglia. He was vice-chairman of the National Portrait Gallery. He was also the chairman of the English section of ICOMOS, the International Commission for Monuments and Sites and member of its international board.

The Duke of Grafton's home was Euston Hall, near Thetford. He was made a Knight Companion of the Garter in 1976. He died in 2011 at Euston Hall, Suffolk.

== Marriage and children ==
On 12 October 1946, he married Ann Fortune Smith (Mistress of the Robes to Queen Elizabeth II from 1967 until her death). They had five children:

- James Oliver Charles FitzRoy, Earl of Euston (13 December 1947 – 1 October 2009), married Lady Clare Amabel Margaret Kerr, daughter of the 12th Marquess of Lothian, and had issue, one son, Henry FitzRoy, 12th Duke of Grafton, and four daughters.
- Lady Henrietta Fortune Doreen FitzRoy (born 14 September 1949), who married Edward St. George.
- Lady Virginia Mary Elizabeth FitzRoy (born 10 April 1954), who married (and divorced) Lord Ralph Kerr, son of Peter Kerr, 12th Marquess of Lothian; remarried, but has no issue.
- Lord Charles Patrick Hugh FitzRoy (born 7 January 1957), who married Diana Miller-Stirling, and has two sons.
- Lady (Olivia) Rose Mildred FitzRoy (born 1 August 1963), who married Guy Monson, an investment funds manager, and has two daughters.

Peerage of England
Preceded by Charles FitzRoy	Duke of Grafton; 1970–2011	Succeeded by Henry FitzRoy
