= Henry FitzRoy, 12th Duke of Grafton =

British peer and music promoter

His Grace The Duke of Grafton
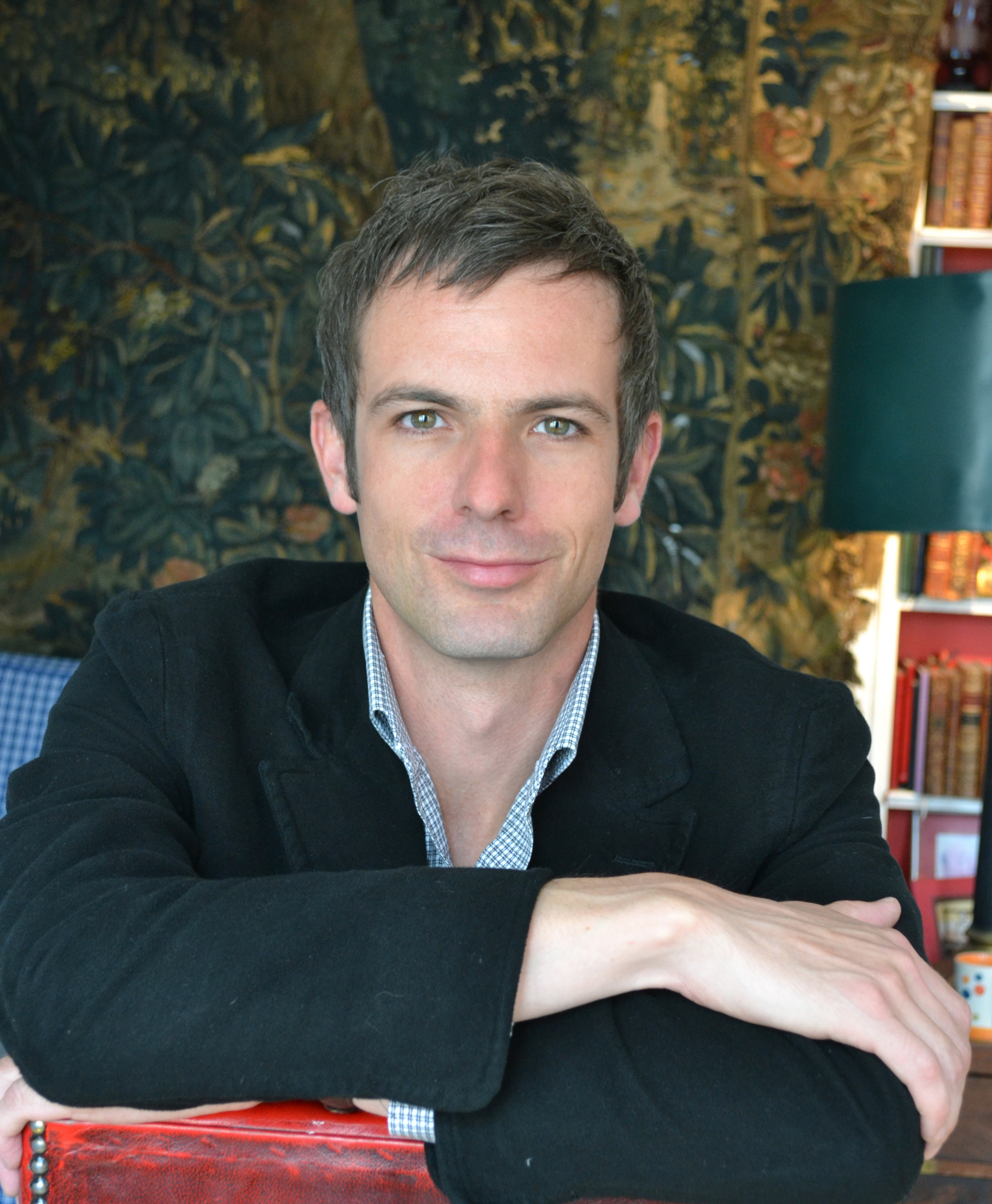
- Grafton in 2013
- Full name: Henry Oliver Charles FitzRoy
- Born: 6 April 1978 (age 48); London, Middlesex
- Spouse: Olivia Sladen (m. 2010)
- Issue: 3
- Parents: James, Earl of Euston; Lady Clare Kerr

Henry Oliver Charles FitzRoy, 12th Duke of Grafton (born 6 April 1978), known as Harry Grafton, is an English peer and music promoter. He inherited the Dukedom of Grafton from his grandfather, Hugh FitzRoy, 11th Duke of Grafton, on 7 April 2011. He is also a direct male-line descendant of Charles II of England.

His farming estate and seat is Euston Hall, at Euston in Suffolk, near Thetford in Norfolk.

== Early life ==
Grafton is the son of James Oliver Charles FitzRoy, Earl of Euston (1947–2009), and his wife, Lady Clare Amabel Margaret Kerr, one of the daughters of the 12th Marquess of Lothian.

His ancestor Henry FitzRoy, 1st Duke of Grafton (1663–1690), was a bastard son of King Charles II by his mistress Barbara Villiers. Grafton shares the surname FitzRoy (meaning "son of the king") with other natural lines descended from Charles II.

Educated at Harrow School and the University of Edinburgh, Grafton spent a post-graduate year at the Royal Agricultural College, Cirencester, studying estate management.

== Career ==
From 2002 to 2004, Viscount Ipswich, as the Duke was then known, worked in the United States in music business management, as a radio host in Nashville, Tennessee, and in 2005–2006 as a merchandise coordinator for the Rolling Stones on the A Bigger Bang tour.

In 2007, he moved to London and in 2009, due to the death of his father, returned to Suffolk to help manage the 10,000-acre (40 km^{2}) Euston Hall estate. He also gained the courtesy title of Earl of Euston, but decided to remain as Viscount Ipswich.

On 7 April 2011, the 11th Duke of Grafton died, aged 92, and his grandson the present Duke succeeded to the peerages and estates. He currently promotes live music events while modernising the farms of the estate.

== Marriage ==
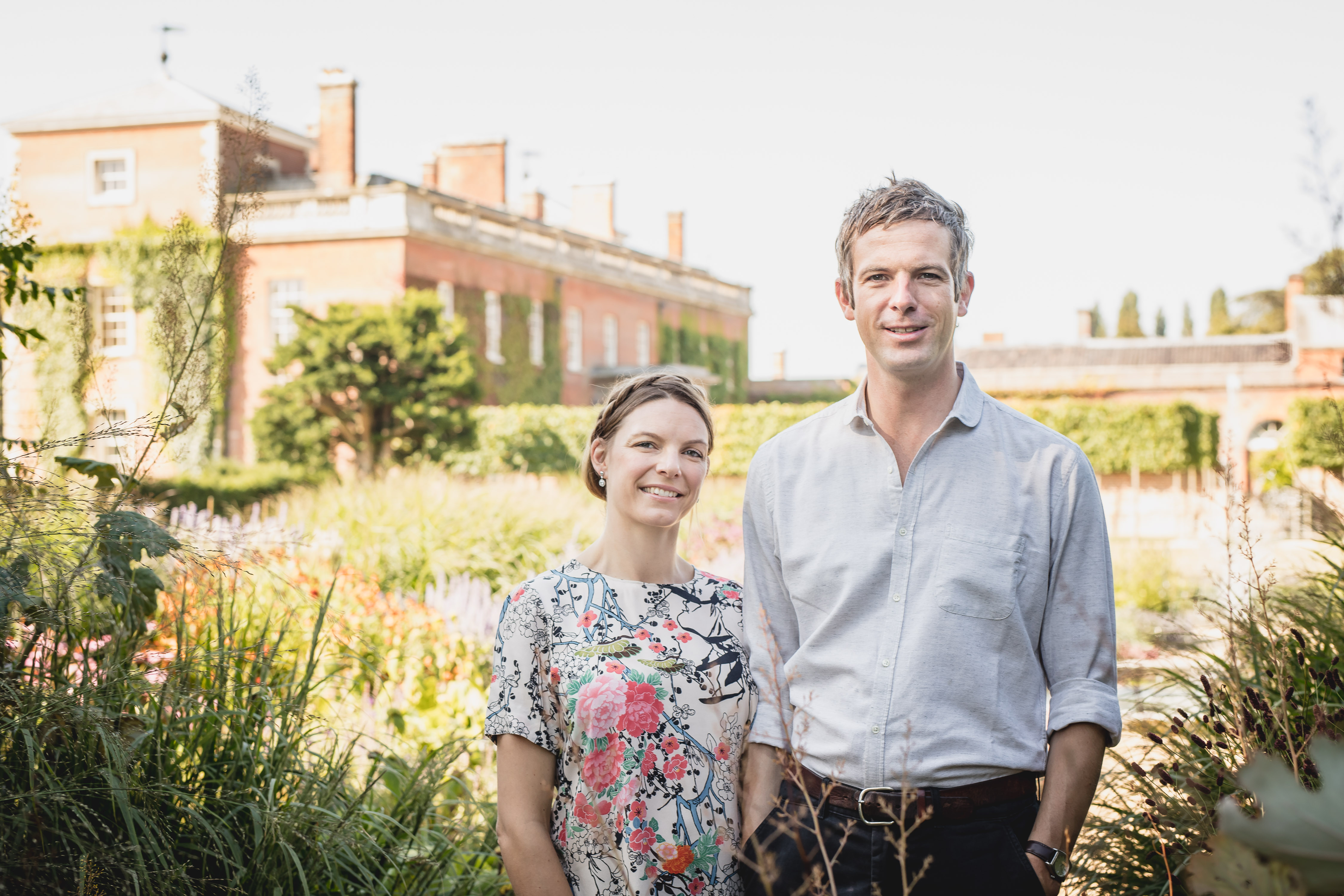
The Duke and Duchess of Grafton in front of their home, Euston Hall

On 14 August 2010, at Snowshill, Gloucestershire, Lord Ipswich, as he was still known, married Olivia Margaret Sladen. They are the parents of two sons and one daughter.

1. Alfred James Charles FitzRoy, Earl of Euston, heir apparent, born 26 December 2012
2. Lady Rosetta Christina Clare FitzRoy, born 20 July 2015
3. Lord Ralph Simon Lennox FitzRoy, born 16 March 2017

== Arms ==
Coat of arms of Henry FitzRoy, 12th Duke of Grafton
| Coronet The coronet of a Duke Crest On a Chapeau Gules turned up Ermine a Lion statant guardant Or ducally crowned Azure and gorged with a Collar counter-compony Argent and of the fourth Escutcheon The Royal Arms of Charles II, viz. Quarterly: 1st and 4th, France and England quarterly; 2nd, Scotland; 3rd, Ireland; the whole debruised by a Baton sinister compony of six pieces Argent and Azure Supporters Dexter: a Lion guardant Or ducally crowned Azur; Sinister: a Greyhound Argent; each gorged with a Collar counter-compony Argent and Azure Motto Et decus et pretium recti (Latin for "Both the ornament and the reward of virtue") |

The Grafton coat of arms includes Charles II's royal arms crossed by a baton sinister. It is an accurate coat as the male lineage is royal and is quartered since the union of crowns and is only in non-succession to these due to illegitimacy.

Peerage of England
| Preceded by Hugh FitzRoy | Duke of Grafton; 2011–present | Incumbent |
Orders of precedence in the United Kingdom
| Preceded by The Duke of Richmond | Gentlemen; The Duke of Grafton | Succeeded by The Duke of Beaufort |
