= Marchioness of Lothian =

The title Marchioness of Lothian is given to the wife of the Marquess of Lothian, and may refer to:

- Harriet Lowry-Corry, Viscountess Belmore (1762–1805), wife of William Kerr, 6th Marquess of Lothian
- Harriet Kerr, Marchioness of Lothian (1780–1833), second wife of the William Kerr, 6th Marquess of Lothian
- Cecil Chetwynd Kerr, Marchioness of Lothian (1808–1877), British noblewoman, philanthropist, and wife of John Kerr, 7th Marquess of Lothian
- Antonella Kerr, Marchioness of Lothian (1922–2007), British aristocrat, journalist, writer, and wife of Peter Kerr, 12th Marquess of Lothian
- Jane Kerr, Marchioness of Lothian, wife of Michael Andrew Foster Jude Kerr, 13th Marquess of Lothian
