= Izo FitzRoy =

British musician

- Born: Lady Isobel FitzRoy; 1985 (age 40–41); London
- Occupations: Singer; songwriter; musician
- Years active: 2017–present
- Musical career
- Genre: Soul
- Instruments: Vocals, piano
- Labels: Jalapeno Records; Tucxone Records; Lovemonk
- Website: izofitzroy.com

Lady Isobel Anne FitzRoy (born 1985) is an English singer, songwriter, and musician, known professionally as Izo FitzRoy.

== Early life ==
Izo FitzRoy is the fourth and youngest daughter of James FitzRoy, Earl of Euston and Clare FitzRoy, Countess of Euston. She began to play piano at the age of seven - her grandfather was a jazz pianist. She was the youngest of five children, her brother is Henry FitzRoy, 12th Duke of Grafton, and listened a lot to Bill Withers, Otis Redding, James Brown and Janis Joplin.

At the age of 19, she joined the Soul Sanctuary Gospel Choir as a singer in London and then founded the Great Sea Gospel Choir. She also sang with other bands like the St Joan of Arc' Gospel Choir. She studied at University of Glasgow and wrote her first songs with comic lyrics and recorded them on a couple of EPs. Then she went to New Orleans for several months and sang with Jon Cleary and his band The Absolute Monster Gentlemen. Izo FitzRoy said she was not particularly religious but she liked singing gospel: "gospel is about singing to something bigger than yourself. It takes you out of the humdrum of every day, and makes you hopeful and grateful".

== Career ==
In 2017 she released her first album Skyline produced by Dr. Rubberfunk mixing soul, funk, blues and gospel and talked about Hurricane Katrina and xenophobia.

In 2020 the second album How The Mighty Fall was edited, recorded at Paris, London and Sheffield with different producers: Dimitri from Paris, Shawn Lee, Colin Elliott and different bands: Haggis Horns and Soul Sanctuary Gospel Choir. Her voice was compared to Janis Joplin and had more flexibility in her range after a surgery. Written after a break-up, this album was more personal and autobiographical. How The Mighty Fall was more versatile than the first album always rooted in soul and gospel but also with disco. The singer had earned her airplay on renowned stations like BBC, NPR, FIP and Jazz Radio. These stations declared that she was being one of the top soul music and dance music singers to come on the scene in years The album was nominated for Prix Soul of the Académie du Jazz.

In 2023, Izo FitzRoy released her third album A Good Woman produced by Oscar De Jong (Kraak & Smaak). The main subject was about being a woman in a male-dominated society. She also worked with her band and the choir and again opened her music to rock, pop and bossa nova. The title God Gets A Little Busy Sometimes was inspired by the Murder of Sarah Everard by a policeman in London and the singer wanted to talk about feeling unsafe as a woman.

== Discography ==
=== Albums ===
- Skyline (2017)
- How The Mighty Fall (2020)
- A Good Woman (2023)

=== Collaborations ===
- Hope You Can Wait with Crazy P (2017)
- You're Gone with Smoove & Turrell (2018)
- Sweet Time with Kraak & Smaak (2019)
- Velvet Seas with Kraak & Smaak (2025)

== Awards ==
- Académie du Jazz 2020: Nomination for Prix Soul for How The Mighty Fall
