= Elizabeth Scott, Duchess of Buccleuch =

Elizabeth Scott, Duchess of Buccleuch may refer to:

- Elizabeth Scott, Duchess of Buccleuch (1743–1827), wife of Henry Scott, 3rd Duke of Buccleuch, Duchess from 1767 until 1812
- Elizabeth Scott, Duchess of Buccleuch (1954–2023), wife of Richard Scott, 10th Duke of Buccleuch, Duchess from 2007 until 2023
