= Isabella FitzRoy, Duchess of Grafton =

British peer and heiress

Her Grace The Duchess of Grafton
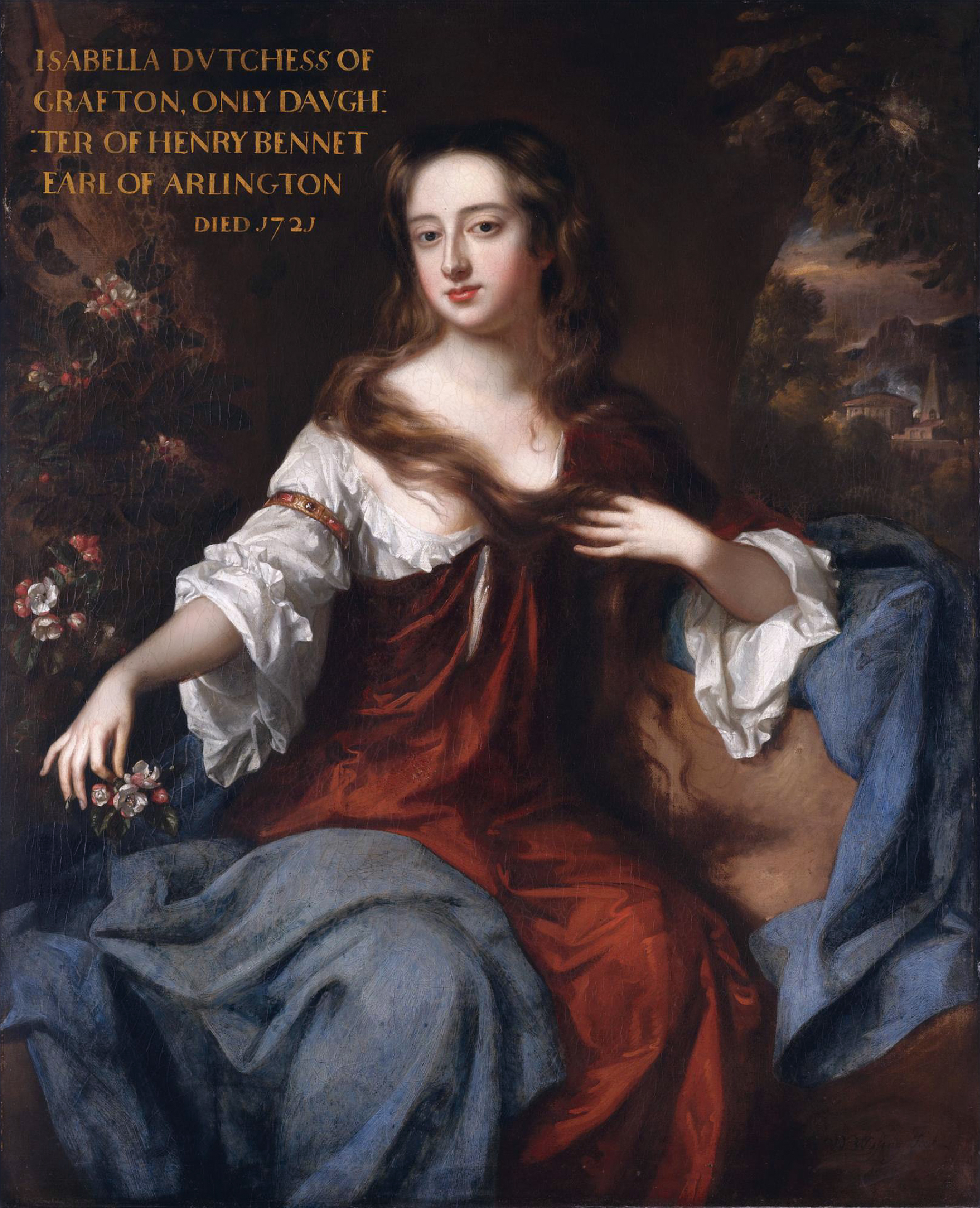
- 1686 Oil painting of Isabella, Dutchess of Grafton by Willem Wissing

Personal details
- Born: Isabella Bennet c. 1668
- Died: 7 February 1723
- Spouses: Henry FitzRoy, 1st Duke of Grafton (m. 1672; died 1690) Sir Thomas Hanmer (m. 1698)
- Children: Charles FitzRoy, 2nd Duke of Grafton
- Parent(s): Henry Bennet, 1st Earl of Arlington; Isabella of Nassau-Beverweert

Isabella Bennet FitzRoy, Duchess of Grafton and later 2nd Countess of Arlington suo jure (c. 1668 – 7 February 1723), was a British peer and heiress.

== Life ==
Isabella Bennet was the only daughter of Henry Bennet, 1st Earl of Arlington, a Royalist commander, by his wife, Isabella of Nassau-Beverweert (1633–1718). Isabella was a daughter of Louis of Nassau-Beverweerd and thus a granddaughter of Maurice of Nassau, Prince of Orange, and a great-granddaughter of William the Silent. She was also a Lady of the Bedchamber and the Lady of the Robes to Catherine of Braganza.

Henry Bennet was created Baron Arlington in 1665 for his loyalty to the crown. Lord Arlington was later raised in the peerage to the titles of Earl of Arlington and Viscount Thetford, all of which were created with a special remainder to allow his daughter to inherit.

She was married at the age of four to Henry FitzRoy, Earl of Euston (later created Duke of Grafton), the nine-year-old illegitimate son of King Charles II. The wedding ceremony was repeated on 7 November 1679 and they lived at Euston Hall. Isabella and her husband had one son, Charles FitzRoy, who succeeded his parents as 2nd Duke of Grafton and 3rd Earl of Arlington.

After her husband's death in 1690 from a wound received at the storming of Cork while leading the forces of William of Orange, she remarried on 14 October 1698 to Sir Thomas Hanmer, 4th Baronet, Speaker of the House of Commons. They remained married until her death on 7 February 1723.

== Other ==
Isabella was one of the Hampton Court Beauties painted by Sir Godfrey Kneller for Queen Mary II. Isabella also walked at the coronation of Queen Anne.

Peerage of England
| Preceded by Henry Bennet | Countess of Arlington; 1685–1723 | Succeeded by Charles FitzRoy |
