= Charles FitzRoy, 10th Duke of Grafton =

British peer, soldier and landowner (1892–1970)

His Grace The Duke of Grafton
- Duke of Grafton by Walter Stoneman, 1936

Member of the House of Lords
- In office 4 August 1936 – 11 November 1970
- Preceded by: John FitzRoy, 9th Duke of Grafton
- Succeeded by: Hugh FitzRoy, 11th Duke of Grafton

Personal details
- Born: Charles Alfred Euston FitzRoy; 4 June 1892 Euston Hall, Euston, Suffolk, England
- Died: 11 November 1970 (aged 78) Bury St Edmunds, England
- Spouses: Lady Doreen Buxton (m. 1918; died 1923) Lucy Eleanor Barnes (m. 1924; died 1943) Rita Emily Carr-Ellison (m. 1944; died 1970)
- Children: Hugh FitzRoy, 11th Duke of Grafton; Lady Anne Mackenzie; Lord Charles FitzRoy; Lord Edward Anthony Charles FitzRoy; Lord Michael FitzRoy
- Parent(s): Rev. Lord Charles Edward FitzRoy; Hon. Ismay FitzRoy
- Education: Wellington College, Berkshire; Royal Military College, Sandhurst

Military service
- Allegiance: United Kingdom
- Branch/service: British Army
- Unit: Royal Welch Fusiliers

Charles Alfred Euston FitzRoy, 10th Duke of Grafton (4 June 1892 – 11 November 1970), known as Charles FitzRoy until 1936, was a British aristocrat, soldier, politician, and farmer.

== Background and education ==
Grafton was born at Euston Hall near Thetford, the eldest son of the Reverend Lord Charles Edward FitzRoy and of his wife, Hon. Ismay FitzRoy, daughter of Charles FitzRoy, 3rd Baron Southampton. His paternal grandparents were Augustus FitzRoy, 7th Duke of Grafton, and Anna Balfour. Another ancestor, Anne Warren, was the daughter of Admiral Sir Peter Warren and a descendant of the Schuyler family, the Van Cortlandt family, and the Delancey family, all from British North America.

He was educated at Wellington and then at the Royal Military College, Sandhurst.

== Military career ==
In 1911, he joined the Royal Welch Fusiliers, who were stationed at Quetta in what is now Pakistan. In 1914, soon after the outbreak of the Great War, he went to France, and in 1917, he was appointed as aide-de-camp and comptroller to Lord Buxton, Governor General of South Africa. He remained in South Africa until 1920. In 1921, he retired from the army.

== Farming ==
After retirement from the Army, he became a farmer at Coney Weston in Suffolk. From 1927 to 1936, he was land agent for his first wife's maternal uncle, Owen Hugh Smith, at Langham in Rutland. In 1936, he succeeded his second cousin John FitzRoy as Duke of Grafton and inherited the family estates based at Euston Hall.

== Marriage and issue ==
FitzRoy married, firstly, Lady Doreen Maria Josepha Sydney Buxton (29 November 1897 – 28 July 1923), daughter of his commanding officer Sydney Buxton, 1st Earl Buxton, and his wife, Mildred Anne Smith, on 24 January 1918. They had three children:

- Hugh Denis Charles FitzRoy, 11th Duke of Grafton (3 April 1919 – 7 April 2011).
- Lady Anne Mildred Ismay FitzRoy (7 August 1920 – 4 November 2019), married Major Colin Dalzell Mackenzie and had issue.
- Lt. Lord Charles Oliver Edward FitzRoy (13 July 1923 – 6 August 1944), killed in action in Normandy while serving with the Grenadier Guards; unmarried.

Lady Doreen died of septicaemia weeks after the birth of their third child. A year later, he married, secondly, Lucy Eleanor Barnes (25 December 1897 – 11 September 1943), daughter of Sir George Stapylton Barnes and of his wife, Sybil de Gournay Buxton. The ceremony took place on 6 October 1924. Lucy was the first cousin of Charles' first wife. They had two children:

- Lord Edward Anthony Charles FitzRoy (26 August 1928 – 25 November 2007), married Veronica Mary Ruttledge and had issue.
- Lord Michael Charles FitzRoy (18 March 1932 – 15 July 1954), died in the Solomon Islands (missing, presumed drowned or killed by shark while swimming).

The year after his second wife's death, he married, thirdly, Rita Emily Carr-Ellison (24 October 1911 – 24 August 1970), daughter of John Ralph Carr-Ellison and of his wife, Alice Ursula Lang. The ceremony took place on 18 July 1944.

He died at Bury St Edmunds on 11 November 1970.

== Ancestry ==
Ancestry of Charles FitzRoy, 10th Duke of Grafton

8. Henry FitzRoy, 5th Duke of Grafton
4. Augustus FitzRoy, 7th Duke of Grafton
9. Mary Caroline Cranfield Berkeley
2. Charles Edward FitzRoy
5. Anna Balfour
1.Charles FitzRoy, 10th Duke of Grafton
12. George FitzRoy, 2nd Baron Southampton
6. Charles FitzRoy, 3rd Baron Southampton
3. Ismay FitzRoy
14. Walter Nugent, 1st Baron Nugent
7. Ismania Catherine Nugent
15. Georgiana Elizabeth Jenkinson

Peerage of England
Preceded by John FitzRoy	Duke of Grafton; 1936–1970	Succeeded by Hugh FitzRoy
