= Antonella Kerr, Marchioness of Lothian =

Italian-born British aristocrat and writer

The Most Honourable The Marchioness of Lothian OBE DSG

Marchioness of Lothian
- Tenure: 30 April 1943 — 11 October 2004
- Born: Antonella Reuss Newland; 8 September 1922; Rome, Kingdom of Italy
- Died: 8 January 2007 (aged 84); Jedburgh, Scotland
- Spouse: Peter Kerr, 12th Marquess of Lothian (m. 1943; died 2004)
- Issue: Lady Mary von Westenholz; Michael Kerr, 13th Marquess of Lothian; Lady Cecil Cameron; Clare FitzRoy, Dowager Countess of Euston; Elizabeth Scott, Duchess of Buccleuch; Ralph Kerr, 14th Marquess of Lothian
- Father: Sir Foster Newland
- Mother: Donna Nennella Salazar y Munatones

Antonella Kerr, Marchioness of Lothian OBE DSG (born Antonella Reuss Newland; 8 September 1922 – 6 January 2007), also known as Tony Lothian, was an Italian-born British aristocrat, journalist and writer.

Lady Lothian was the founding president of the annual Women of the Year Lunches at the Savoy Hotel in 1955, and the mother of Conservative parliamentarian and Shadow Cabinet minister Michael Ancram, Marquess of Lothian.

== Life ==
Antonella Reuss Newland was born in Rome, the only child of Major-General Sir Foster Reuss Newland KCMG CB (1862–1943) and his wife, Donna Nennella Salazar y Munatones.

Her parents married in 1918, but divorced in 1928 after her mother, the daughter of an Italian army lieutenant-general, Conte Michele Salazar (descendant of a Spanish nobleman from the times of the Spanish presence in Italy), left her 66-year-old father for a 27-year-old army officer, later Brigadier William Carr CVO DSO.

Newland married a distant relative, Peter Kerr, 12th Marquess of Lothian, at the Brompton Oratory on 30 April 1943; he was then serving as a lieutenant in the Scots Guards. The couple spent most of their married life at Monteviot House and its surrounding 18,000-acre (73 km^{2}) estate near Jedburgh in the Scottish Borders. The Kerrs also owned Melbourne Hall in Derbyshire but they later retired to Ferniehirst Castle in Roxburghshire after dividing the other estates between their sons.

The couple had two sons and four daughters. Her husband died on 11 October 2004, being succeeded by their elder son, Conservative politician Michael, Earl of Ancram. The younger son is Lord Ralph Kerr. Their eldest daughter, Lady Mary Kerr, was a folksinger and won a silver medal in skiing at the 1969 British Commonwealth Games, and later married Charles von Westenholz. Their second daughter, Lady Cecil Kerr, married Donald Cameron of Lochiel, the XXVII and present Chief of Clan Cameron. The other daughters married the heirs of the Duke of Grafton and the Duke of Buccleuch and Queensberry: Clare Kerr married James FitzRoy, Earl of Euston, and Lady Elizabeth Kerr married Richard Scott, Earl of Dalkeith, the 10th and present Duke of Buccleuch and Queensberry.

Lady Lothian pursued her own independent career as an author, broadcaster and journalist. She was a columnist with the Scottish Daily Express from 1960 to 1975. She was elected a fellow of the Institute of Journalists and won the Templeton Award in 1992.

With Odette Hallowes and Lady Georgina Coleridge she founded the annual Women of the Year Lunches at the Savoy Hotel in 1955, in aid of the Greater London Fund for the Blind and other charities. She was vice-president of the Royal College of Nursing from 1960 to 1980 as well as being a patron of the National Council of Women of Great Britain and the Royal College of Obstetricians and Gynaecologists.

Lady Lothian lost an eye in 1970 as a result of cancer, afterwards using a black eye patch. She was appointed an OBE in 1997 "for services to women and blind people" and a Dame of the Order of St Gregory the Great in 2002.

Lady Lothian interviewed the Soviet cosmonaut Valentina Tereshkova for her book ''Valentina: First Woman in Space.

== Bibliography ==
- Fight for the Light: What Should Christians Do So that New Shapes in Suffering Can be Overcome? (Church of Scotland, 1973)
- Valentina: First Woman in Space : Conversations with A. Lothian (Pentland Press, 1993) ISBN 9781858210643

== Honours ==
- - OBE
- - DSG

== See also ==
- Marquess of Lothian
- List of family seats of Scottish nobility
