= Elizabeth Scott, Duchess of Buccleuch (1954–2023) =

English peer (1954–2023)

Her Grace The Duchess of Buccleuch and Queensberry
- Born: Lady Elizabeth Marion Frances Kerr; 8 June 1954; Shardlow, Derbyshire, England
- Died: 30 April 2023 (aged 68)
- Education: London School of Economics
- Spouse: Richard Montagu Douglas Scott, 10th Duke of Buccleuch (m. 1981)
- Children: 4
- Parents: Peter Kerr, 12th Marquess of Lothian (father); Antonella Newland (mother)

Elizabeth Marion Frances Montagu Douglas Scott, Duchess of Buccleuch and Queensberry (born Lady Elizabeth Kerr; 8 June 1954 – 30 April 2023), styled Countess of Dalkeith between 1981 and 2007, was a Scottish peeress and philanthropist.

== Early life and family ==
Lady Elizabeth Marion Frances Kerr was born on 8 June 1954 to Peter Kerr, 12th Marquess of Lothian, and his wife, Antonella Newland. Her siblings included Michael Kerr, 13th Marquess of Lothian, and Clare FitzRoy, Countess of Euston.

The Duchess received a bachelor's degree in sociology from the London School of Economics.

== Career ==
After graduating from LSE, the Duchess worked for BBC Radio 4's Kaleidoscope programme and later BBC Radio Solway after her marriage. She was involved in a number of arts organizations, serving as chairwoman of the Scottish Ballet and the Heritage Education Trust and a trustee of the National Museums Scotland and the British Museum. In 2010, she founded the Walter Scott Prize for Historical Fiction and subsequently the Young Walter Scott Prize. She was a patron of the Royal Caledonian Ball.

== Marriage and issue ==
On 31 October 1981, she married Richard Montagu Douglas Scott, Earl of Dalkeith, later 10th Duke of Buccleuch and 12th Duke of Queensberry. Styled as Countess of Dalkeith from marriage, she became Duchess of Buccleuch and Queensberry when her husband succeeded to the dukedoms on his father's death in 2007.

They had four children:

- Lady Louisa Jane Therese Montagu Douglas Scott (born 1 October 1982)
- Walter John Francis Montagu Douglas Scott, Earl of Dalkeith (born 2 August 1984)
- Lord Charles David Peter Montagu Douglas Scott (born 20 April 1987)
- Lady Amabel Clare Alice Montagu Douglas Scott (born 23 June 1992)

The Duchess's husband was once Scotland's largest private landowner and the family resided on four estates, Boughton House in Northamptonshire, Drumlanrig Castle in Dumfries and Galloway, and Eildon Hall and Bowhill House in the Scottish Borders.

== Death ==
The Duchess died of pneumonia on 30 April 2023, at the age of 68. Her death came six days before the coronation of King Charles III and Queen Camilla where her husband carried the Sceptre with Cross into Westminster Abbey. She is buried at Melrose Abbey.
