= Duke of Grafton =

Title in the Peerage of England

Dukedom of Grafton
- Quarterly: 1st and 4th, France and England quarterly (Royal Arms of Charles II); 2nd, Scotland; 3rd, Ireland; the whole debruised by a baton sinister compony of six pieces argent and azure.
- Creation date: 11 September 1675
- Created by: Charles II
- Peerage: Peerage of England
- First holder: Henry FitzRoy
- Present holder: Henry FitzRoy, 12th Duke
- Heir apparent: Alfred FitzRoy, Earl of Euston
- Remainder to: the 1st Duke's heirs male of the body lawfully begotten
- Subsidiary titles: Earl of Euston; Viscount Ipswich; Baron Sudbury
- Seat: Euston Hall

Duke of Grafton is a title in the Peerage of England. It was created in 1675 by Charles II of England for Henry FitzRoy, his second illegitimate son by the Duchess of Cleveland. The most notable Duke of Grafton was Augustus FitzRoy, 3rd Duke of Grafton, who served as Prime Minister from 1768–1770.

The Duke of Grafton holds three subsidiary titles, all created in 1672 in the peerage of England: Earl of Euston, Viscount Ipswich, and Baron Sudbury. Between 1723 and 1936 the dukes, being descended from the 1st Duke's wife Isabella FitzRoy, 2nd Countess of Arlington, also held the titles Earl of Arlington, Viscount Thetford, and Baron Arlington. Those titles fell into abeyance between the 9th Duke's sisters, with the abeyance of the barony of Arlington ending in 1999.

The Dukes "created" and owned the London district of Fitzrovia, so named for their family name.

The title of the dukedom refers to the Honour of Grafton in the southeast of Northamptonshire, the titular village now being called Grafton Regis.

The Duke of Grafton is fourth in the order of precedence after the dukes of Norfolk, Somerset, and Richmond.

== Estates ==
The family seat is Euston Hall in Suffolk, an 11,000-acre estate straddling the Norfolk-Suffolk border. The main burial places of the senior branch of the family are in and beside the parish church of Saint Genevieve at Euston, Suffolk.

In the 1883 edition of John Bateman's The Great Landowners of Great Britain and Ireland, William FitzRoy, 6th Duke of Grafton's estates were recorded as spanning 25,773 acres across England, including 11,127 acres in Suffolk, 14,507 acres in Northamptonshire, and 139 acres in Buckinghamshire, which produced a combined annual income of £39,284.

=== London Residences ===
==== Arlington House ====
The 1st Duke of Grafton, born Henry FitzRoy, was the illegitimate son of King Charles II and Barbara Villiers. In August 1672, at the age of eight, he was betrothed to the five-year-old Lady Isabella Bennet, the only surviving child and heiress of Henry Bennet, 1st Earl of Arlington. FitzRoy was made Earl of Euston later that month, and in September 1675 he was created Duke of Grafton. A further marriage ceremony took place in November 1679; during his short life, the 1st Duke often used his father-in-law's London residence, Arlington House, where his only son Charles FitzRoy, Earl of Euston, was born on 25 October 1683.

The site of Arlington House had previously been occupied by Goring House, the residence of George Goring, 1st Earl of Norwich. During the mid-seventeenth century, Goring had defaulted on his rent, and a large fire destroyed Goring House in September 1674, by which time the house had been acquired by Lord Arlington. Lord Arlington subsequently constructed a new mansion, Arlington House, on the site, which was completed in 1675.

Following the death of the 1st Duke's father-in-law in 1685, his wife Isabella, Duchess of Grafton, inherited Arlington House. The 1st Duke died in 1690 and was succeeded by his only child Charles FitzRoy, 2nd Duke of Grafton. Isabella, Dowager Duchess of Grafton, continued to maintain Arlington House as her London residence during the early years of her widowhood; she subseqently was remarried to Sir Thomas Hanmer, 4th Baronet in October 1698, and during the same year she leased Arlington House to John Sheffield, 1st Marquess of Normanby. In May 1702 Lord Normanby purchased Arlington House from Isabella for £13,000. Lord Normanby was later made Duke of Buckingham and Normanby in 1703, and between 1702 and 1705 he commissioned William Winde and William Talman to construct a new mansion, Buckingham House, on the site where Arlington House had stood. Following the Duke of Buckingham's death, Buckingham House passed to his illegitimate son Sir Charles Herbert Sheffield, 1st Baronet, who later sold the mansion to George III in 1762 for approximately £28,000. The house and its surroundings were subsequently enlarged and remodelled over several decades, eventually becoming Buckingham Palace.

==== Old Grafton House ====
Charles FitzRoy, 2nd Duke of Grafton was six years old when he succeeded his father as Duke of Grafton; during his minority, the trustees of the Grafton Estates, acting on the young Duke's behalf behalf, purchased a property on the west side of Bond Street, Mayfair, where a new London mansion was later constructed by Thomas Barlow and John Chamberlain. The 2nd Duke took up residence in December 1706, and the house became known as Grafton House. In 1727 the mansion underwent substantial extensions, including the addition of a large wing on the north side of the building. Grafton House remained the Duke's London residence until his death in 1757.

As the 2nd Duke's four sons had all predeceased him, he was succeeded by Augustus FitzRoy, Earl of Euston, the eldest surviving son of the 2nd Duke's third son, Lord Augustus FitzRoy. The 3rd Duke inherited his grandfather's interest in Grafton House upon the latter's death, and continued to occupy the property until 1765. The house, which subsequently became known as Old Grafton House, was briefly let to William Pitt, 1st Earl of Chatham, in 1767. By February 1768, the 3rd Duke had agreed to sell the freehold portion of the property, together with a sublease of its adjoining wing and garden, to John Hobart, 2nd Earl of Buckinghamshire, whose lease commenced in June 1769. Old Grafton House occupied the northern end of the block between Bond Street and Albemarle Street, which adjoined land which later became the site of Grafton Street.

==== Grafton House, Clarges Street ====
Following his departure from Old Grafton House in 1765, the 3rd Duke took up residence No. 22 Arlington Street, St James's. He vacated this property in 1775, and established his London residence at No. 12 Albemarle Street, Mayfair, which was located on the site of the modern-day Royal Arcade, London. During the late 1770s, the Duke commissioned Sir Robert Taylor to design a new London residence, which was also to be called Grafton House, located at the corner of Piccadilly and Clarges Street (and subsequently assigned the street address of No. 47 Clarges Street). Following the completion of construction, the 3rd Duke took up residence at the new Grafton House in mid-1779, which continued to be his London residence until his death in 1811, when he was succeeded by his eldest son George FitzRoy, 4th Duke of Grafton.

For much of the 19th century the London house of the Dukes of Grafton continued to be Grafton House, 47 Clarges Street, Piccadilly. George FitzRoy, 4th Duke of Grafton took up residence at Grafton House after his father's death, and the house was still being used by his grandson William FitzRoy, 6th Duke of Grafton in early 1873.

==== Grosvenor Place and Carton House Terrace ====
The 6th Duke purchased the lease of a new London residence at No. 4 Grosvenor Place, Belgravia in April 1874. Following his death in 1882, he was succeeded by his brother Augustus FitzRoy, 7th Duke of Grafton. Under the terms of the 6th Duke's will, his widow inherited his leasehold interest in No. 4 Grosvenor Place; he directed that his property in Clarges Street be sold, with the proceeds to form part of the inheritance of his brother and successor. The Dowager Duchess of Grafton later sold the lease of 4 Grosvenor Place in March 1890.

In 1891 the 7th Duke leased a new London house overlooking The Mall at No. 17 Carlton House Terrace, which he used as his London residence until 1901.

==== Chesterfield Gardens and Prince's Gate ====
In 1902 the 7th Duke of Grafton leased No. 6 Chesterfield Gardens, which remainded as his London residence until his death in 1918. He was succeeded by his son Alfred FitzRoy, 8th Duke of Grafton, who continued to maintain 6 Chesterfield Gardens as his London house until his death in 1930.

The 8th Duke was succeeded by his 15-year-old grandson John FitzRoy, 9th Duke of Grafton. In mid-1930 the eighth Duke’s widow Susanna, Duchess of Grafton (step-grandmother of the 9th Duke), and their daughter Lady Cecilia FitzRoy took up residence at a new London house, No. 18 Prince's Gate, Knightsbridge. 18 Prince's Gate remained as the Dowager Duchess of Grafton's London house until her death in 1961, after which it continued to be the residence of her daughter Lady Cecilia until the latter sold the house in 1965.

== Dukes of Grafton (1675) ==
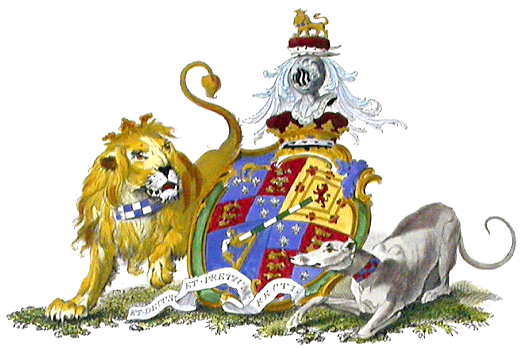
Arms of the Dukes of Grafton

Other titles (all): Earl of Euston, Viscount Ipswich and Baron Sudbury (1672)

- Henry FitzRoy, 1st Duke of Grafton (1663–1690), second illegitimate son of Charles II and the Duchess of Cleveland;

Other titles (2nd–9th Dukes): Earl of Arlington, Viscount Thetford and Baron Arlington (1672)

- Charles FitzRoy, 2nd Duke of Grafton (1683–1757), only son of the 1st Duke
  - Charles FitzRoy, Earl of Euston (1714–1715), eldest son of the 2nd Duke, died young
  - George FitzRoy, Earl of Euston (1715–1747), second son of the 2nd Duke, predeceased his father without issue
- Augustus Henry FitzRoy, 3rd Duke of Grafton (1735–1811), eldest son of Lord Augustus FitzRoy, third son of the 2nd Duke; Prime Minister, 1768–70
- George Henry FitzRoy, 4th Duke of Grafton (1760–1844), eldest son of the 3rd Duke
- Henry FitzRoy, 5th Duke of Grafton (1790–1863), eldest son of the 4th Duke
- William Henry FitzRoy, 6th Duke of Grafton (1819–1882), eldest son of the 5th Duke, died without issue
- Augustus Charles Lennox FitzRoy, 7th Duke of Grafton (1821–1918), second son of the 5th Duke
  - Henry James FitzRoy, Earl of Euston (1848–1912), eldest son of the 7th Duke, predeceased his father without issue
- Alfred William Maitland Fitzroy, 8th Duke of Grafton (1850–1930), second son of the 7th Duke
  - William Henry Alfred Fitzroy, Viscount Ipswich (1884–1918), only son of the 8th Duke, predeceased both his father and grandfather
- John Charles William FitzRoy, 9th Duke of Grafton (1914–1936), only son of William FitzRoy, Viscount Ipswich, died unmarried
- Charles Alfred Euston FitzRoy, 10th Duke of Grafton (1892–1970), eldest son of the Rev. Lord Charles Edward FitzRoy, third and youngest son of the 7th Duke
- Hugh Denis Charles FitzRoy, 11th Duke of Grafton (1919–2011), eldest son of the 10th Duke
  - James Oliver Charles FitzRoy, Earl of Euston (1947–2009), eldest son of the 11th Duke, predeceased his father in 2009
- Henry Oliver Charles FitzRoy, 12th Duke of Grafton (b. 1978), only son of Lord Euston

The heir apparent is the present holder's son, Alfred James Charles FitzRoy, Earl of Euston (b. 2012).

== Arms ==
Coat of arms of Duke of Grafton
Coronet The coronet of a Duke Crest On a Chapeau Gules turned up Ermine a Lion statant guardant Or ducally crowned Azure and gorged with a Collar counter-compony Argent and of the fourth. Escutcheon The Royal Arms of Charles II, viz Quarterly: 1st and 4th, France and England quarterly; 2nd, Scotland; 3rd, Ireland; the whole debruised by a Baton sinister compony of six pieces Argent and Azure Supporters Dexter: a Lion guardant Or ducally crowned Azure; Sinister: a Greyhound Argent, each gorged with a Collar counter-compony Argent and Azure. Motto Et Decus Et Pretium Recti (The ornament and recompense of virtue)

== Family tree and simplified line of succession ==
Dukes of Grafton family tree

King Charles II; 1630–1685
illegitimate
with Lucy Walter	with Catherine Pegge	with Barbara (Villiers) Palmer	with Nell Gwyn; 1650–1687	with Louise de Kérouaille
Duke of Grafton, Earl of Euston, Viscount Ipswich and Baron Sudbury, 1675
James Scott; 1649–1685; Duke of Monmouth, Duke of Buccleuch	Charles FitzCharles; 1657–1680; Earl of Plymouth	Charles FitzRoy; 1662–1730; Duke of Cleveland, Duke of Southampton	Henry FitzRoy; 1663–1690; 1st Duke of Grafton, etc.	George FitzRoy; 1665–1716; Duke of Northumberland	Charles Beauclerk; 1670–1726; Duke of St Albans	Charles Lennox; 1672–1723; Duke of Richmond, Duke of Lennox
Charles FitzRoy; 1683–1757; 2nd Duke of Grafton, etc.
Charles Henry FitzRoy; 1714–1715 styled Earl of Euston	George FitzRoy; 1715–1747 styled Earl of Euston	Augustus FitzRoy; 1716–1741
Baron Southampton
Augustus Henry FitzRoy; 1735–1811; 3rd Duke of Grafton, etc.	Charles FitzRoy; 1737–1797; 1st Baron Southampton
George Henry FitzRoy; 1760–1844; 4th Duke of Grafton, etc.	George Ferdinand FitzRoy; 1761–1810; 2nd Baron Southampton
Henry FitzRoy; 1790–1863; 5th Duke of Grafton, etc.	Charles FitzRoy; 1804–1872; 3rd Baron Southampton
William Henry FitzRoy; 1819–1882; 6th Duke of Grafton, etc.	Augustus Charles Lennox FitzRoy; 1821–1918; 7th Duke of Grafton, etc.	Viscounts Daventry
Henry James FitzRoy; 1848–1912 styled Earl of Euston	Alfred William Maitland FitzRoy; 1850–1930; 8th Duke of Grafton, etc.	Charles Edward FitzRoy; 1857–1911	Ismay FitzRoy; 1863–1952
William Henry Alfred FitzRoy; 1884–1918 styled Viscount Ipswich	Charles Alfred Euston FitzRoy; 1892–1970; 10th Duke of Grafton, etc.
John Charles William FitzRoy; 1914–1936; 9th Duke of Grafton, etc.	Hugh Denis Charles FitzRoy; 1919–2011; 11th Duke of Grafton, etc.
James Oliver Charles FitzRoy; 1947–2009 styled Earl of Euston
Henry Oliver Charles FitzRoy b. 1978; 12th Duke of Grafton
Alfred James Charles FitzRoy b. 2012 styled Earl of Euston
Heir apparent

Line of succession (simplified)
- Charles FitzRoy, 2nd Duke of Grafton (1683–1757)
  - Lord Augustus FitzRoy (1716–1741)
    - Augustus FitzRoy, 3rd Duke of Grafton (1735–1811)
      - George FitzRoy, 4th Duke of Grafton (1760–1844)
        - Henry FitzRoy, 5th Duke of Grafton (1790–1863)
          - William FitzRoy, 6th Duke of Grafton (1819–1882)
          - Augustus FitzRoy, 7th Duke of Grafton (1821–1918)
            - Alfred FitzRoy, 8th Duke of Grafton (1850–1930)
              - William Henry Alfred FitzRoy, Viscount Ipswich (1884–1918)
                - John FitzRoy, 9th Duke of Grafton (1914–1936)
            - Lord Charles Edward FitzRoy (1857–1911)
              - Charles FitzRoy, 10th Duke of Grafton (1892–1970)
                - Hugh FitzRoy, 11th Duke of Grafton (1919–2011)
                  - James FitzRoy, Earl of Euston (1947–2009)
                    - Henry FitzRoy, 12th Duke of Grafton (born 1978)
                      - (1). Alfred James Charles FitzRoy, Earl of Euston (born 2012)
                      - (2). Lord Rafe Simon Lennox FitzRoy (born 2017)
                  - (3). Lord Charles Patrick Hugh FitzRoy (born 1957)
                    - (4). Nicholas Augustus Charles FitzRoy (born 1991)
                    - (5). George James Hugh FitzRoy (born 1993)
                - Lord Edward Anthony Charles FitzRoy (1928–2007)
                  - male issue and descendants in remainder
      - Admiral Lord William FitzRoy (1782–1857)
        - Francis Horatio FitzRoy (1823–1900)
          - Cyril Duncombe FitzRoy (1861–1939)
            - Charles Francis Mark FitzRoy (1909–1994)
              - male issue and descendants in remainder
    - Charles FitzRoy, 1st Baron Southampton (1737–1797)
      - George Ferdinand FitzRoy, 2nd Baron Southampton (1761–1810)
        - Charles FitzRoy, 3rd Baron Southampton (1804–1872)
          - Charles Henry FitzRoy, 4th Baron Southampton (1867–1958)
            - Barons Southampton
          - Hon. Edward FitzRoy (1869–1943) m. Muriel FitzRoy, 1st Viscountess Daventry (1869–1962)
            - Viscounts Daventry

== See also ==
- Viscount Daventry (created for Muriel FitzRoy the widow of the Speaker Edward FitzRoy the second son of Charles FitzRoy, 3rd Baron Southampton).
- Baron Southampton (created for Charles FitzRoy the son of Lord Augustus FitzRoy).
