= Ismania FitzRoy, Baroness Southampton =

Irish aristocrat

The Right Honorable Ismania FitzRoy, Baroness Southampton VA

Personal details
- Born: Ismania Catherine Nugent; 23 September 1838 Ireland
- Died: 18 August 1918 (aged 79) Park Place, Englefield Green
- Spouse: Charles FitzRoy, 3rd Baron Southampton
- Children: Hon. Ismay Mary Helen Augusta FitzRoy; Frederica Louise Fitzroy; Hon. Blanche Georgiana Fitzroy; Charles Henry Fitzroy, 4th Baron Southampton; Captain Rt. Hon. Edward Algernon FitzRoy
- Parent(s): Walter Nugent, 1st Baron Nugent; Georgiana Elizabeth Jenkinson

Ismania Catherine FitzRoy, Baroness Southampton VA (née Nugent; 23 September 1838 – 18 August 1918) was an Irish aristocrat, the wife of Charles FitzRoy, 3rd Baron Southampton. She served as Lady of the Bedchamber to Queen Victoria.

== Family and early life ==
Ismania Catherine Nugent was born on 23 September 1838 in County Westmeath in Ireland. Her father was a Baron of the Austrian Empire, Walter Nugent, 1st Baron Nugent, while her mother was his second wife, Georgiana Elizabeth Jenkinson.

== Marriage ==
On 25 February 1862 she married Charles FitzRoy, 3rd Baron Southampton, becoming his second wife. He had no children by his first wife. They had five children.

- Hon. Mary Helen Augusta Ismay FitzRoy (1863 – 22 April 1952), married Sir Charles Edward FitzRoy, they had six children (including Charles FitzRoy, 10th Duke of Grafton);
- Hon. Frederica Louise FitzRoy (1864 – 9 April 1932), married Percy Edward Crutchley, had a son;
- Hon. Blanche Georgiana FitzRoy (1865 – 22 November 1944), married Edward Sholto Douglas-Pennant, 3rd Baron Penrhyn, had five children;
- Charles Henry FitzRoy, 4th Baron Southampton (11 May 1867 – 7 October 1958), married Lady Hilda Maria Dundas, had five children;
- Hon. Edward Algernon FitzRoy (24 July 1869 – 3 March 1943), married Muriel Douglas-Pennant, Viscountess Daventry, had four children.

He died after just ten years of marriage and as a result FitzRoy remained the Dowager Baroness for another 45 years.

== Career ==
In 1878, some years after the death of her husband, she was appointed Lady of the Bedchamber to Queen Victoria and served in that capacity until 1901. For her service to the Queen she was awarded The Royal Order of Victoria and Albert. However she did not make an entirely good impression on another lady-in-waiting Marie Mallett who wrote in her diary in 1888 that 'Lady Southampton is most kind but her dullness is beyond description".
