= Baton sinister =

Heraldic charge

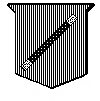
A baton sinister.

The baton sinister (alternatively baston) is a charge used in heraldry.

== Heraldic charge ==
Arms of Henry Charles FitzRoy, first Duke of Grafton (1663–1690), a natural son of King Charles II: the royal arms, crossed by a baton which is both sinister and compony

It is a diminutive of the bend sinister and constitutes a narrow strip that runs from the upper sinister to the lower dexter of a coat of arms. Sinister (meaning left in Latin) is merely a directional indicator, and does not carry the negative connotations of the word in modern English.

It is commonly believed to be an indicator of an illegitimate birth in the family line, and is used in this way in literary contexts. However, in medieval England, there was no single mark of difference for bastardy. Until the late fourteenth century, the same marks of cadency were used for both illegitimate and legitimate children, but thereafter the arms of some bastards took the form of a plain or party field with their fathers' arms on a figure such as a bend, fess, chief, chevron or quarter.

The baton sinister can be seen in the arms of the Duke of Grafton, descended from an illegitimate son of King Charles II of England. Today, the College of Arms in England uses a bordure wavy to mark an armiger as illegitimate. The Court of the Lord Lyon in Scotland uses a bordure compony to denote the same.
