= Michael Ancram =

British politician and peer (1945–2024)

The Most Honourable The Marquess of Lothian PC KC DL
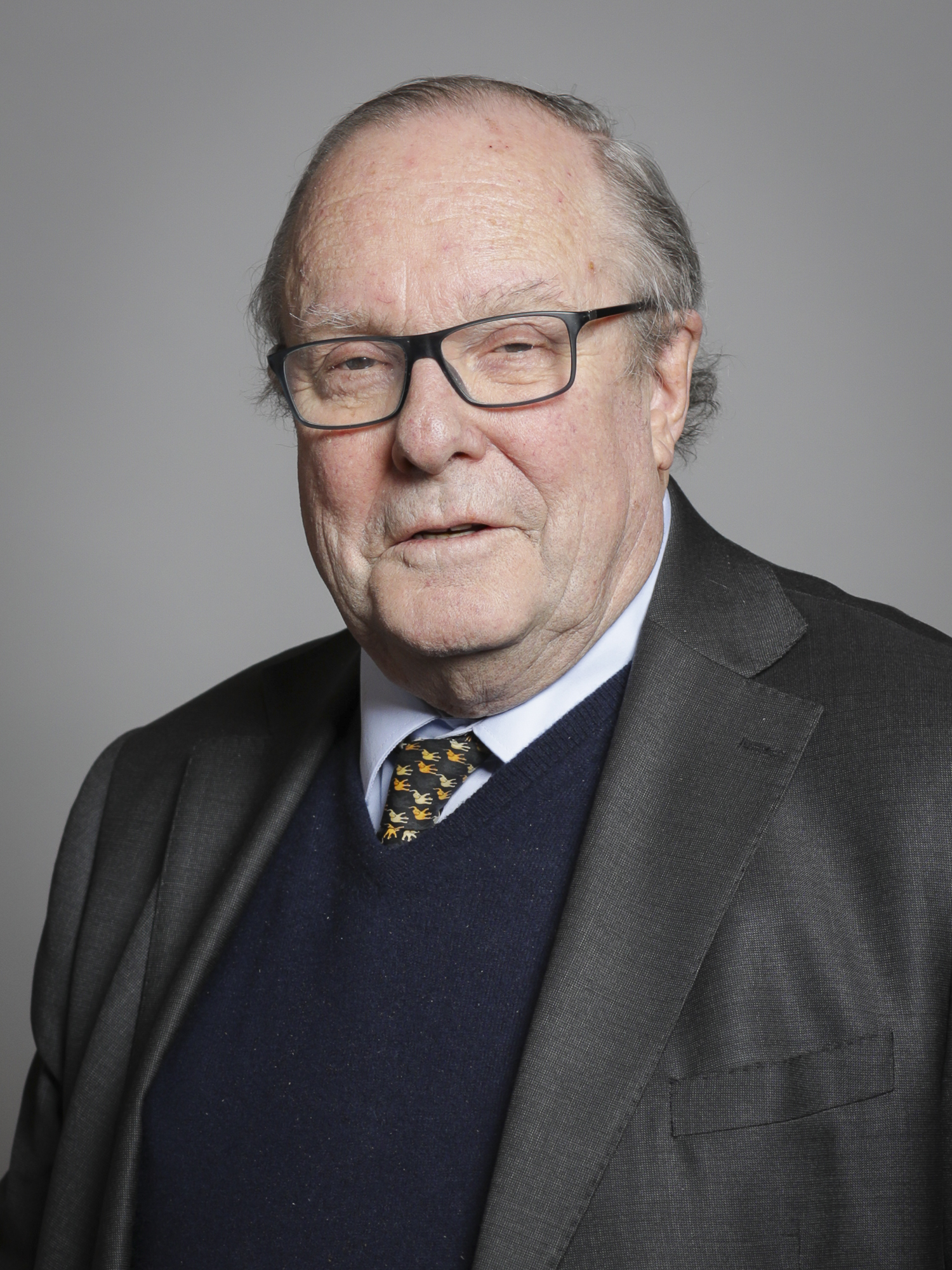
- Official portrait, 2019

Deputy Leader of the Conservative Party
- In office 18 September 2001 – 6 December 2005
- Leader: Iain Duncan Smith; Michael Howard
- Preceded by: Peter Lilley (Note: Office vacant between 15 June 1999 and 18 September 2001.)
- Succeeded by: Alex Burghart (Note: Office vacant between 6 December 2005 and 1 September 2026. William Hague subsequently served as Senior Member of the Shadow Cabinet.)

Chairman of the Conservative Party
- In office 2 December 1998 – 18 September 2001
- Leader: William Hague
- Preceded by: Cecil Parkinson
- Succeeded by: David Davis
Shadow cabinet posts
Shadow Secretary of State for Defence
In office 10 May 2005 – 6 December 2005
Leader	Michael Howard
Preceded by	Nicholas Soames
Succeeded by	Liam Fox
Shadow Foreign Secretary
In office 18 September 2001 – 10 May 2005
Leader	Iain Duncan Smith; Michael Howard
Preceded by	Francis Maude
Succeeded by	Liam Fox
Shadow Constitutional Affairs Spokesperson
In office 19 June 1997 – 1 June 1998
Leader	William Hague
Preceded by	William Hague; Michael Howard
Succeeded by	Liam Fox
Ministerial offices
Minister of State for Northern Ireland
In office 11 January 1994 – 2 May 1997
Prime Minister	John Major
Preceded by	Robert Atkins
Succeeded by	Adam Ingram
Parliamentary Under-Secretary of State for Northern Ireland
In office 27 May 1993 – 11 January 1994
Prime Minister	John Major
Preceded by	Jeremy Hanley
Succeeded by	Tim Smith
Parliamentary Under-Secretary of State for Scotland
In office 13 June 1983 – 14 June 1987
Prime Minister	Margaret Thatcher
Preceded by	Alex Fletcher
Succeeded by	James Douglas-Hamilton

Member of the House of Lords
- Lord Temporal
- Life peerage 22 November 2010 – 1 October 2024

Member of Parliament
- In office 9 April 1992 – 12 April 2010
- Preceded by: Charles Morrison
- Succeeded by: Claire Perry
- Constituency: Devizes
- In office 3 May 1979 – 18 May 1987
- Preceded by: Michael Hutchison
- Succeeded by: Nigel Griffiths
- Constituency: Edinburgh South
- In office 28 February 1974 – 20 September 1974
- Preceded by: John Mackintosh
- Succeeded by: John Mackintosh
- Constituency: Berwick and East Lothian

Personal details
- Born: Michael Andrew Foster Jude Kerr; 7 July 1945 London, England
- Died: 1 October 2024 (aged 79)
- Party: Conservative
- Spouse: Lady Jane Fitzalan-Howard (m. 1975)
- Children: 3
- Parents: The 12th Marquess of Lothian; Antonella Newland
- Relatives: Nick Hurd (son-in-law)
- Education: Christ Church, Oxford; University of Edinburgh

Michael Andrew Foster Jude Kerr, 13th Marquess of Lothian, Baron Kerr of Monteviot, PC, KC, DL (7 July 1945 – 1 October 2024), commonly known as Michael Ancram, was a British politician and peer who served as Deputy Leader of the Conservative Party from 2001 to 2005. He was formerly styled Earl of Ancram until he inherited the marquessate in 2004, upon the death of his father.

Born in London and educated at Ampleforth College, Ancram studied history at Christ Church, Oxford, and read law at the University of Edinburgh. After graduating from Edinburgh, he was called to the Scottish Bar and practised as an advocate before entering politics. He unsuccessfully contested West Lothian in 1970, but was elected as Member of Parliament (MP) for Berwick and East Lothian at the February 1974 general election and served until he lost the seat in the election held in October of that year. He re-entered Parliament in 1979, representing Edinburgh South until his defeat in 1987. During this time, he served as a minister at the Scotland Office in Margaret Thatcher's government.

After being elected to represent Devizes at the 1992 general election, Ancram served at the Northern Ireland Office in John Major's government. When Major was defeated at the 1997 general election, the Conservatives entered opposition and Ancram became Chairman of the Conservative Party under William Hague in 1998, having previously covered constitutional affairs in the Shadow Cabinet. This was followed by a period as deputy party leader under Iain Duncan Smith and Michael Howard, during which time he served in the Shadow Cabinet as shadow foreign secretary and shadow defence secretary respectively.

== Early life and career ==
Ancram was born in London and is the elder son and second child of Peter Kerr, 12th Marquess of Lothian, and his wife Antonella. He was educated at Ampleforth College in North Yorkshire. He graduated as a Bachelor of Arts in History from Christ Church, Oxford, in 1966, later by convention converted to a Master of Arts. While at Oxford, he was a member of the Bullingdon Club. In 1968, he gained a Bachelor of Laws (LLB) degree from the University of Edinburgh. He was called to the Scottish Bar in 1970 and began to practise as an advocate.

== Political career ==
=== Member of Parliament ===
Ancram unsuccessfully contested the West Lothian parliamentary seat in 1970. He was first elected to Parliament in the February 1974 general election, when he contested and won the seat of Berwick and East Lothian, but lost the seat in the October election of the same year. After losing his seat, he again took up legal practice.

Ancram re-entered Parliament at the 1979 election as the Member of Parliament for Edinburgh South, beating future prime minister Gordon Brown. He was a member of the House of Commons Energy Select Committee between 1979 and 1983, and chairman of the Scottish Conservative and Unionist Party from 1980 to 1983. He was Parliamentary Under-Secretary of State at the Scottish Office with responsibility for home affairs, housing, local government, rating reform and the environment from 1983 until 1987. He lost his seat again at the 1987 general election, being one of several prominent Conservatives defeated in Scotland in that contest.

After losing his seat in 1987, Ancram returned to Parliament at the 1992 general election representing Devizes. He was a member of the Public Accounts Committee and chairman of the backbench Constitutional Affairs Committee from 1992 until May 1993, when he was appointed Parliamentary Under-Secretary of State at the Northern Ireland Office. He was promoted to minister of state at the Northern Ireland Office in January 1994, and was sworn as a Privy Councillor in January 1996.

=== Shadow Cabinet and failed leadership bid ===
Following the Conservatives' defeat at the 1997 election, Ancram served in the Shadow Cabinet as Shadow Constitutional Affairs Spokesperson from June 1997 to June 1998. He then served as Chairman of the Conservative Party from December 1998 to September 2001.

In 2001, he ran against Iain Duncan Smith, Michael Portillo, Kenneth Clarke and David Davis in the election for the party leadership. In the first poll of Conservative MPs he and David Davis were tied for last place, leading to a re-run in which Ancram was placed bottom. He was eliminated, and Davis withdrew. Both swung their support behind Iain Duncan Smith, who went on to win, beating Clarke in the final vote of party members. Duncan Smith made Ancram Deputy Leader of the Conservative Party and Shadow Foreign Secretary in September 2001. He remained in this position after Michael Howard took over in 2003.

Ancram became Marquess of Lothian upon his father's death in October 2004, but did not take up use of this title in public life whilst still sitting as an MP (although properly he should have ceased being styled by the courtesy title of Earl of Ancram). The House of Lords Act 1999 meant that, on acceding to the peerage, he was not disqualified from sitting in the House of Commons as hereditary peers no longer had an automatic right to sit in the House of Lords. Excepting Irish peers, he was, after the Viscount Thurso, and Viscount Hailsham, the third person to have sat in the House of Commons while simultaneously being a hereditary peer.

In the reshuffle following the 2005 election, Lothian was moved to Shadow Secretary of State for Defence but remained deputy leader. He stood down from the Shadow Cabinet in December 2005, following the election of David Cameron as Conservative Party Leader. In January 2006 he was appointed to the Intelligence and Security Committee, replacing James Arbuthnot.

=== Later years as an MP ===
Lothian was a founding signatory in 2005 of the Henry Jackson Society principles, advocating a proactive approach to the spread of liberal democracy across the world, including when necessary by military intervention. On 21 April 2006 he became one of the first senior Conservative MPs to call for British troops to withdraw from Iraq, saying it was effectively in a state of civil war and that "It is time now for us to get out of Iraq with dignity and honour while we still can."

In 2006, Lothian set up Global Strategy Forum, a bi-partisan foreign affairs think tank based in London.

From 2008 to 2013, Lothian was chair of foreign policy forum Le Cercle.

Lothian was a founder member of the Top Level Group of UK Parliamentarians for Multilateral Nuclear Disarmament and Non-proliferation, established in October 2009.

On 11 August 2009, Lothian announced that he was to stand down as the MP for Devizes at the 2010 general election due to heart problems. He retired when Parliament was dissolved on 12 April 2010; his successor as Conservative member for the Devizes constituency was Claire Perry.

== Personal life ==
Lothian married Lady Jane Fitzalan-Howard, the fourth daughter of the 16th Duke of Norfolk, who on 7 April 2017 succeeded as the 16th Lady Herries of Terregles. They were both prominent Roman Catholics. She is a Patron of the Right to Life Trust and also a patroness of the Royal Caledonian Ball. The couple had three daughters and two grandchildren:

- Sarah Margaret Kerr (born and died 13 June 1976)
- Lady Clare Therese Kerr (25 January 1979) married in August 2010 The Right Honourable Nick Hurd, former Conservative MP and son of former Conservative Foreign Secretary Douglas Hurd, the Lord Hurd of Westwell. Lady Clare is the heiress presumptive to her mother’s Scottish peerage. They have two children:
  - Leila Rose Hurd (17 May 2012)
  - Caspar Jamie Hurd (30 September 2014)
- Lady Mary Kerr (28 May 1981), a filmmaker who directed the award-winning 2012 documentary Radioman. She married Zackary Adler on 28 May 2016.

Lothian's younger sister, Lady Cecil Cameron OBE, married Donald Angus Cameron of Lochiel, the chief of Clan Cameron. Another sister, the former Lady Clare Kerr, is now Dowager Countess of Euston CVO and mother of the 12th Duke of Grafton.

Lord Lothian was a keen country music fan and often played acoustic guitar at Conservative Party conferences. He was a knight of the Order of St John and of the Order of St Lazarus; he was also made a Freeman of Gibraltar in 2010.

He was appointed a Deputy lieutenant for Roxburgh, Ettrick and Lauderdale in 1990. He became a Queen's Counsel (QC) in 1996.

By virtue of being the Marquess of Lothian, Ancram was hereditary Chief of the Scottish Clan Kerr. A member of the House of Lords from 2010 as a life peer, he was the only marquess sitting in the chamber at the time of his death.

=== Death ===
Lord Lothian died following a short illness on 1 October 2024, at the age of 79. He was succeeded by his brother, Ralph Kerr, as the 14th Marquess of Lothian.

== Name and titles ==
Although his family name was Kerr, Michael Ancram was known from birth by the courtesy title Earl of Ancram as elder son and heir apparent of the 12th Marquess of Lothian. He is said to have dropped the use of this title in favour of plain Mr Michael Ancram after becoming a lawyer, supposedly because he believed it might confuse the jury if any judge were to have addressed him as "My Lord".

Lothian was known to many of his friends as Crumb, a nickname attributed to a party in the sixties at which on arrival Ancram introduced himself as "Lord Ancram" and was duly announced as "Mr Norman Crumb".

Lothian was created a life peer on 22 November 2010 as Baron Kerr of Monteviot, of Monteviot in Roxburghshire, and was introduced in the House of Lords the same day; by custom, he was referred to by his senior title as The Marquess of Lothian during all parliamentary business and in other official records such as Hansard.

As the Kerr family titles cannot pass through the female line, his younger brother Lord Ralph Kerr succeeded to his titles following his death. His elder daughter is her mother's heir presumptive to be Lady Herries of Terregles. Ancram was also one of the five co-heirs to the barony of Butler, abeyant since 1905. Though the most junior heir by primogeniture, he held the strongest claim, as the other heirs had a lesser share to that title. On his death, his share was subdivided between his two daughters (leaving six co-heirs, each of the last baron's three sisters now being represented by two co-heirs with 1/6 shares).

== Arms ==
Coat of arms of Michael Ancram
Coronet A coronet of a Marquess Crest A Sun as in the Arms Escutcheon Quarterly: 1st and 4th, A Sun in Splendour Proper (Lothian, as an escutcheon of augmentation); 2nd and 3rd, Gules on a Chevron Argent three Mullets of the Field (Lordship of Jedburgh) Supporters Dexter: an Angel Proper vested Azure surcoated Vert winged and crined Or; Sinister: a Unicorn Argent armed maned and unguled Or gorged with a Collar Gules charged with three Mullets Argent Motto Sero Sed Serio (Late but in earnest)

== Notes ==
Parliament of the United Kingdom
Preceded by John Mackintosh	Member of Parliament for Berwick and East Lothian; 1974	Succeeded by John Mackintosh
Preceded by Michael Hutchison	Member of Parliament for Edinburgh South; 1979–1987	Succeeded by Nigel Griffiths
Preceded by Charles Morrison	Member of Parliament for Devizes; 1992–2010	Succeeded by Claire Perry
Political offices
Preceded by William Hague; Michael Howard	Shadow Constitutional Affairs Spokesperson; 1997–1998	Succeeded by Liam Fox
Preceded by Francis Maude	Shadow Secretary of State for Foreign and Commonwealth Affairs; 2001–2005	Succeeded by Liam Fox
Preceded by Nicholas Soames	Shadow Secretary of State for Defence; 2005	Succeeded by Liam Fox
Party political offices
Preceded by Cecil Parkinson	Chairman of the Conservative Party; 1998–2001	Succeeded by David Davis
Vacant Title last held by Peter Lilley	Deputy Leader of the Conservative Party; 2001–2005	Vacant Title next held by Alex Burghart
Peerage of Scotland
Preceded by Peter Kerr	Marquess of Lothian; 2004–2024	Succeeded by Ralph Kerr
