= Women of the Year Lunch =

Women of the Year Lunch and Awards
- Abbreviation: WOYLA
- Formation: 29 September 1955
- Founder: Tony Lothian, Georgina Coleridge, Odette Hallowes
- President: Julie Etchingham
- Website: womenoftheyear.co.uk

The Women of the Year Lunch, later known as the Women of the Year Lunch and Awards (WOYLA), is an annual charity lunch for women achievers. The inaugural lunch was held on 29 September 1955 at the Savoy Hotel, and raised money for the Greater London Fund for the Blind. All of the 500 invitees were regarded as women of the year, with none singled out for individual acclaim. Since 2001, prizes have been awarded at the event. In 2014, the Women of the Year Lunch marked its 60th anniversary.

== History ==
The Women of the Year Lunch was co-founded in 1955 by Tony Lothian, Georgina Coleridge (journalist and Marchioness of Tweeddale), and Odette Hallowes (a British spy captured and tortured by the Nazis during World War II). Lothian, a freelance journalist, had the inspiration for the Lunch – the first such event for what she called 'career women of distinction' – when she was refused entry to a men-only event. She recruited her two co-founders and together they drew up a list of 40 categories of employment. They then approached a woman working in each of these fields, asking them to nominate colleagues worthy of inviting to the Lunch.

As the founding president of the Women of the Year Lunch, Lothian was keen to invite and celebrate women whose achievements were not otherwise being acknowledged, rather than using the event to further congratulate the few who were already famous. However, many of her unknown invitees did go on to achieve fame. In later years, a Nominating Council made up of women from all walks of life has selected those who are invited to the Lunch".

Writing in The Observer in October 2005, Viv Groskop noted, "Since 1955, the list of guest speakers reads like a Who's Who of female achievement: Margaret Thatcher (1960), Sheila Hancock (1969), Germaine Greer (1975), Zandra Rhodes (1981)." She added: "I have enjoyed the unlikely pairings the lunches have inspired: Kate Adie and Toyah Willcox shared a platform in 1986 (theme: 'Vision'), Floella Benjamin and the Duchess of York in 1991 ('Harmony')".

In November 2005, following her appointment as president of the Women of the Year lunch, Joan Armatrading told The Guardian's Helen Birch:

"Lady Lothian was such an inspiration. She invited me to the lunch in 1980 and I was totally bemused to see a room full of women who have been high achievers in all sorts of ways. You realise you never see that. And she managed to keep the spirit and the enthusiasm alive for 45 of the 50 years it's been going. I think they asked me because the president is someone who has to have a care and concern for the organisation."

Armatrading's successor as president, Helena Kennedy, described The Women of the Year Lunch as being about: "women who do amazing things for each other and other people. There was a time when the lunch was only for women in hats of a certain class. But now it's a real celebration of women of all backgrounds who have done incredible things. There are women who have been through terrible experiences of losing a child or having cancer. And instead of taking it lying down, they put their pain into doing good for others. Women are fabulous".

Taking a more negative view in 2005, Groskop recalled: "I remember asking a (female) newspaper editor 10 years ago if it was necessary to have a women's page in the paper. Isn't everything in the news of interest to everyone? She saw what I was getting at but replied: 'If those topics were not written about there, they would not be written about at all.' If this is true, then WOYLA is still a revolutionary thing: a women's hall of fame. But it does seem a shame that their refrain – 'If we don't celebrate ourselves, who else will?' – hasn't changed since the 1950s."

== Prizes ==
Since 2001, prizes have been awarded at the lunch. In the same year, Women of the Year established its own Foundation to help underprivileged women in the United Kingdom and abroad. Amongst those awarded prizes are British singer Ms Dynamite, who received an award in 2003 for her contribution to the campaign against gun crime.

In November 2005, the five sisters and partner of Robert McCartney, who was murdered in a Belfast pub in January of that year, declined the Women of the Year's Outstanding Achievement award when they discovered shortly before the Lunch that in accepting it they would be sharing a platform with former British Prime Minister Margaret Thatcher. Catherine and Claire McCartney said: "Our campaign is one of justice, and as an Irish republican family we feel we cannot share the same platform with a former PM who inflicted injustices on our community". The board of directors of Women of the Year issued a statement saying: "Women of the Year would like to reiterate that we are proud to recognise their remarkable achievement and wish them all our continued support".

=== Frink Award ===
The Frink Award, a bronze eagle sculpted and donated by Elisabeth Frink, is presented in recognition of "women enriching other people's lives while overcoming their own problems". Recipients include the author of the Adrian Mole books Sue Townsend.

== Lectures ==
In 2008, the organisation established the Women of the Year Lectures. The inaugural Lecture was given in February of that year by Mary Robinson, a former United Nations High Commissioner for Human Rights and the Republic of Ireland's first female President. Subsequent lectures have been given by:

- Susan Greenfield (2009),
- Tessa Jowell (2010),
- Nava Dekel (2011),
- Helena Kennedy (2012),
- Helen Prejean (2013), and
- Helen Clark (2014)

== Presidents ==
Founding president Tony (Antonella) Lothian served from 1955 until 2001. She was succeeded by:

- Diana Makgill (2001–2005)
- Joan Armatrading (2005–2010)
- Helena Kennedy (2010–2015)
- Sandi Toksvig (2015–2017)
- Julie Etchingham (2017–)

== See also ==
- List of awards honoring women
