= James FitzRoy, Earl of Euston =

English financier (1947–2009)

Earl of Euston FCA
- Born: James Oliver Charles FitzRoy; 13 December 1947; London, England
- Died: 1 October 2009 (aged 61); Thetford, Norfolk, England
- Spouse: Lady Clare Kerr (m. 1972)
- Issue: Lady Louise Vaughan; Lady Emily FitzRoy; Henry FitzRoy, 12th Duke of Grafton; Lady Charlotte Hook; Lady Isobel FitzRoy
- Parents: Hugh FitzRoy, 11th Duke of Grafton; Ann Fortune Smith

James Oliver Charles FitzRoy, Earl of Euston FCA (13 December 1947 – 1 October 2009) was the eldest child of the 11th Duke of Grafton and his wife Fortune.

== Early life ==
Born in 1947 to the then Earl of Euston, later the 11th Duke, he was styled Viscount Ipswich and was baptised with Queen Elizabeth The Queen Mother as one of his godparents. He was educated at Eton and Magdalene College, Cambridge, graduating BA in 1973, later promoted to MA.

== Career ==
Between 1973 and 1982, Euston was an assistant director of Schroders (J. Henry Schroder Wagg), an asset management company, and then from 1982 to 1987 an executive director of Enskilda Securities.

== Personal life ==
On 16 September 1972, FitzRoy married Lady Clare Amabel Margaret Kerr, daughter of the 12th Marquess of Lothian and Antonella Kerr, Marchioness of Lothian. They had five children:

- Lady Louise Helen Mary FitzRoy (born 11 June 1973)
- Lady Emily Clare FitzRoy (born 6 December 1974)
- Henry Oliver Charles FitzRoy, 12th Duke of Grafton (born 6 April 1978)
- Lady Charlotte Rose FitzRoy (born 10 March 1983)
- Lady Isobel Anne FitzRoy (born 1985)

In 2003, Euston was living at 6 Vicarage Gardens, Kensington. He died at home on 1 October 2009. His funeral took place at St Genevieve's Church, Euston, on 14 October. He predeceased his father, and on the latter's death in 2011, the title of Duke of Grafton passed to Euston's only son Henry.

Court offices
Preceded by David Hughes-Wake-Walker	Page of Honour; 1962–1963	Succeeded by Heneage Legge-Bourke
