= Prince's Gate =

Princes' Gate may refer to:

- Princes' Gates, a monumental gate at Exhibition Place, Toronto, Canada
- the line of recessed buildings and four service roads on Kensington Road facing railings of Hyde Park in Knightsbridge, London, England, part of which is Kingston House East and North
- Princes Gate Spring Water, a Welsh brand of mineral water
- Princes Gate Towers, a now demolished set of tower blocks in Melbourne, Australia
