= Componée =

Heraldic variation

Coat of arms of Beaufort, earls and dukes of Somerset: the royal arms of England differenced with a bordure compony argent and azure, which indicate the first earl's illegitimate birth

In heraldry, an ordinary componée (anciently gobonnée), anglicised to compony and gobony, is composed of a row of squares, rectangles or other quadrilaterals, of alternating tinctures, often found as a bordure, most notably in the arms of the English House of Beaufort.

The Capetian counts of Évreux differenced the French royal arms with a bend compony.

Like a baton sinister, a bordure compony can be used as a difference to delineate cadency and often indicates an illegitimate son, acknowledged but legally barred from inheritance of the feudal estates of his father. The first Earl of Somerset was later legitimized (allowed to inherit the feudal estates) by an act of Parliament, yet retained his original arms as also displayed by his legitimate descendants.

Certain charges cannot be compony, for practical reasons, for example common charges and the chief as they are generally not long and thin in shape. The alternative for thicker shapes is paly or barry, as shown for example in the arms of Strangways, featuring lions paly argent and gules.

Usually only two tinctures are used, but the arms of Formia, Italy, show an unusual bordure which could be blazoned compony of 24 vert, gules, argent, vert, argent, gules.

A variant is counter-compony, with two rows of panes.

A bend or fess billety-counter-billety is, in effect, chequy of three rows of stretched (rather than square) panes, as in the arms of Cullimore in Canada: Azure; a fess billetty counter billetty gules and argent, between, in chief, two crescents and, in base, a wheel or; a bordure or for difference.

Sometimes compony-like arrangements, such as in the arms of the Duke de Vargas Machuca, are not so described in blazon. The coat of arms of the 108th Aviation Regiment of the United States Army is blazoned bordered gyronny of ten.
