= Peter Kerr, 12th Marquess of Lothian =

British politician (1922–2004)

The Most Honourable The Marquess of Lothian KCVO
- by Walter Stoneman, 1949
- Tenure: 12 December 1940 – 11 October 2004
- Predecessor: Philip Kerr, 11th Marquess
- Successor: Michael Kerr, 13th Marquess
- Born: Peter Francis Walter Kerr; 8 September 1922; Shardlow, Derbyshire, England
- Died: 11 October 2004 (aged 82); Jedburgh, Scotland
- Spouse: Antonella Reuss Newland (m. 1943)
- Issue: Lady Mary von Westenholz; Michael Kerr, 13th Marquess of Lothian; Lady Cecil Cameron; Clare FitzRoy, Dowager Countess of Euston; Elizabeth Scott, Duchess of Buccleuch; Ralph Kerr, 14th Marquess of Lothian
- Father: Andrew William Kerr
- Mother: Marie Kerr

Peter Francis Walter Kerr, 12th Marquess of Lothian, KCVO (8 September 1922 – 11 October 2004) was a British peer, politician and landowner. He was the son of Captain Andrew William Kerr by his wife, Marie Kerr. Both of his parents were male-line descendants of William Kerr, 5th Marquess of Lothian.

== Life and career ==
His father, Andrew Kerr, and grandfather, Lord Walter Kerr, the son of the 7th Marquess of Lothian, were officers in the Royal Navy. He was educated at Ampleforth College and Christ Church, Oxford, and joined the Scots Guards. He succeeded his cousin, Philip Kerr, 11th Marquess of Lothian, in 1940, and married a distant cousin, Antonella Newland (d. 2007), daughter of Major General Sir Foster Newland, on 30 April 1943. Lord and Lady Lothian had six children: two sons and four daughters. His wife pursued her own career as a journalist, and founded the Women of the Year Lunch. The family were mainly based at their estates in the Borders, at Newbattle Abbey and Monteviot. The 11th Marquess had left Blickling Hall in Norfolk to the National Trust. Another family house at Melbourne Hall in Derbyshire was opened to the paying public in 1952.

Lothian took part in the Wolfenden inquiry into the UK's laws on homosexuality and prostitution from 1954. He joined the UK's delegation to the United Nations General Assembly during the Suez Crisis in 1956, and was later sent as a delegate to the Council of Europe in 1959 and the Western European Union. He served as parliamentary private secretary to the foreign secretary, Lord Home, from 1960, and was also a whip in the House of Lords. He served as a junior minister at the Ministry of Health during the short period of Lord Home's term as prime minister in 1964. He returned to the Foreign Office with Alec Douglas-Home (then formerly Lord Home) in 1970, serving as parliamentary under-secretary for two years. He was nominated as a member of the European Parliament in 1973, when the UK joined the European Economic Community.

Lord Lothian retired from politics in 1977, after which he served as Lord Warden of the Stannaries, Keeper of the Privy Purse to the Duke of Cornwall, and Chairman of the Prince's Council for the Duchy of Cornwall. He was appointed KCVO in 1983. He was also a member of the Royal Company of Archers, commandant of the Special Constabulary in the Scottish Borders, and a Knight of Malta.

He returned the Franciscan monastery of San Damiano, near Assisi, to the Franciscan Friars Minor in 1979, and he ceded control of Monteviot and Melbourne House to his elder and younger son, respectively, in the 1980s, to take on the restoration of Ferniehirst Castle in Roxburghshire.

== Family ==
The 12th Marquess married Antonella Newland on 30 April 1943. They had five children:

- Lady Mary Marianne Anne Kerr (20 March 1944), who married Charles Freiherr von Westenholz (17 March 1945 – 9 March 2006) on 6 April 1971. They had three sons and six grandchildren.
- Michael Andrew Foster Jude Kerr, 13th Marquess of Lothian (1945–2024), known as Michael Ancram. He married Lady Jane Fitzalan-Howard, later 16th Lady Herries of Terregles, on 7 June 1975. They had three daughters and two grandchildren.
- Lady Cecil Nennella Therese Kerr (22 April 1948), who married Donald Angus Cameron of Lochiel, 27th Chief of Clan Cameron on 1 June 1974. They have four children (including Donald Cameron, Baron Cameron of Lochiel) and five grandchildren.
- Lady Clare Amabel Margaret Kerr (15 April 1951), who married James FitzRoy, Earl of Euston, on 16 September 1972. They have five children and three grandchildren.
- Lady Elizabeth Marion Frances Kerr (1954–2023) she married Richard Scott, 10th Duke of Buccleuch on 31 October 1981. They had four children.
- Ralph William Francis Joseph Kerr, 14th Marquess of Lothian (b. 1957), who married Lady Virginia FitzRoy on 6 September 1980; they were divorced in 1987. He married Marie-Claire Black in 1988. They have six children.

His elder son, the Conservative politician Michael Ancram, succeeded to the marquessate on his death.

== Notes ==
Court offices
Preceded by The Earl Waldegrave	Lord Warden of the Stannaries; 1977–1983	Succeeded by Nicholas Henderson
Peerage of Scotland
Preceded by Philip Kerr	Marquess of Lothian; 1940–2004	Succeeded by Michael Kerr
