= Vision Foundation =

British charity

Vision Foundation, formerly the Greater London Fund for the Blind, is a British charity. It was formed in 1921 by Sir Arthur Pearson to co-ordinate the raising of funds to improve the lives of blind and visually impaired people in London and adopted its current name in 2019. It ran an annual Geranium Day appeal to raise funds.

In 2023, Vision Foundation merged with fellow charity Fight for Sight.
