= Euston Hall =

Historic home in Euston, England

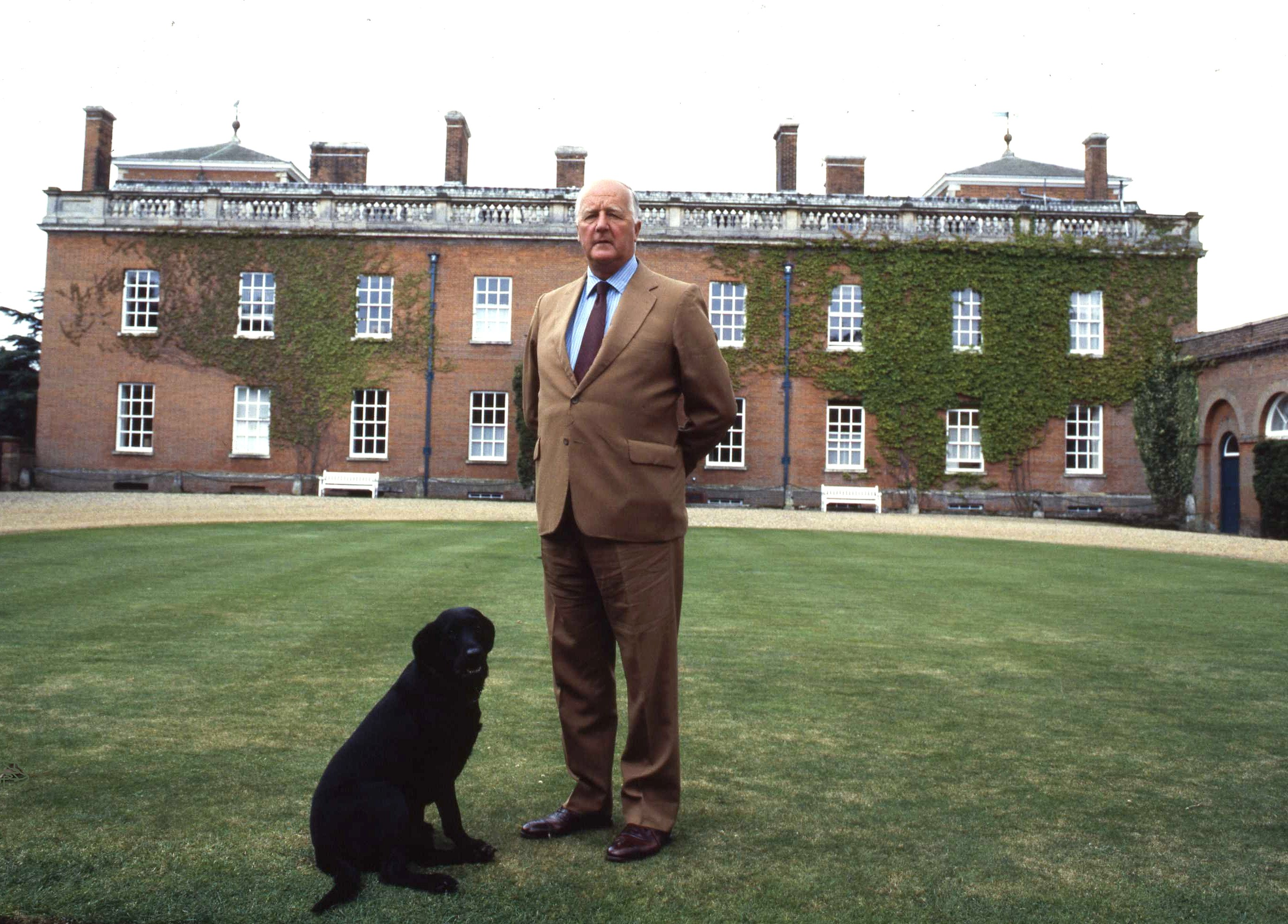
- The 11th Duke of Grafton in front of Euston Hall

- Location within Suffolk

General information
- Location: Euston, Suffolk, England
- Coordinates: 52.37345°N 0.78676°E
- Construction started: 1666
- Completed: 1904
- Owner: Henry FitzRoy, 12th Duke of Grafton

Website
- www.eustonhall.co.uk

Euston Hall is a country house, with park by William Kent and Capability Brown, in Euston, a small village in Suffolk, England, just south of Thetford. It is the family home of the Dukes of Grafton.

== The Hall ==
Euston first appears in the Domesday Book in 1086 as a manor belonging to Bury St. Edmunds Abbey. In August 1578, Elizabeth I stayed at the manor hall with the Rookwood family on her way to Norwich. The owner was a recusant and during the royal visit an image of the Virgin Mary was discovered hidden in a hay rick. The estate, in near ruin, was purchased in 1666 by Henry Bennet, Earl of Arlington and Secretary of State to the newly restored King, Charles II. He constructed a grand house in the French style, built around a central court with large pavilions on each corner. Charles II paid the first of several visits to Euston in 1671. John Evelyn, the diarist, was amongst the large court that accompanied the King.

In 1672 Charles II arranged a marriage between nine-year-old Henry FitzRoy, his illegitimate son by Barbara Villiers, and Isabella Bennet, the Earl of Arlington's five-year-old heiress. FitzRoy was created 1st Duke of Grafton in 1675, and the young couple went through a second wedding ceremony in 1679 when Isabella had reached the age of twelve, then the minimum legal age to marry with consent. The Duke and Duchess inherited Euston Hall in 1685. In about 1750 their son, the second Duke, decided to re-model the house and employed Matthew Brettingham, who supervised the execution of William Kent's and Lord Burlington's design of Holkham Hall in Norfolk. The domes at Euston were replaced by the low pyramid roofs seen today, and part of the house was refaced. On 5 April 1902, a disastrous fire destroyed the south and west wings and the fine Verrio ceilings. The house was soon rebuilt on the same plan, but later the south wing, and most of the west wing, were pulled down by the 10th Duke in 1952.

Euston Hall has a fine art collection, but one Canaletto deserves special mention. According to the Sporting Magazine, February 1793: "About the year 1735 he [the 2nd Duke of Grafton] kept foxhounds at Croydon and went to London very early on the days he hunted. The old Duke used to complain bitterly of the interruption he met with (in crossing the Thames at Westminster) for the delay and inattention of the ferry man, etc., by which he often lost several hours of a fine morning before he arrived in Croydon. To remove this inconvenience he projected a bridge at Westminster, and brought a bill into Parliament for its erection, which was completed in the year 1748." For many years there hung at Euston Hall a contemporary Canaletto of the bridge being built.

The estate gives its name to Euston railway station, the dukes having owned the land in the area where the station was built and promoted its development.

== The Park ==
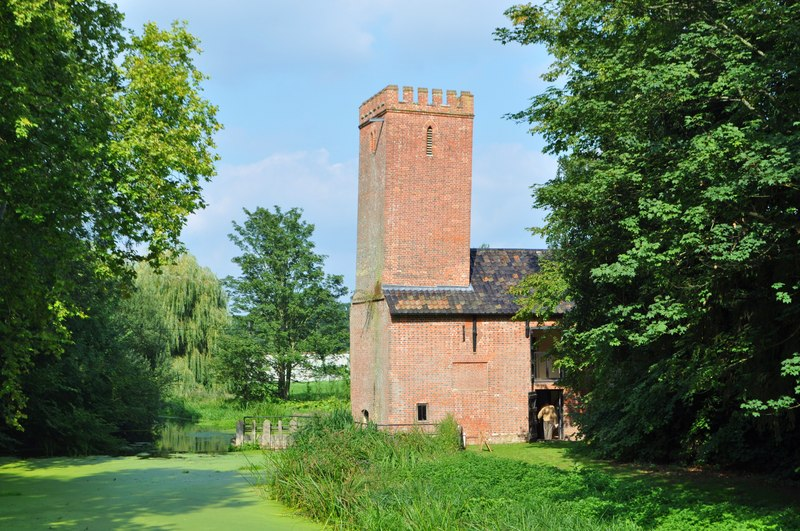
The Watermill in 2010

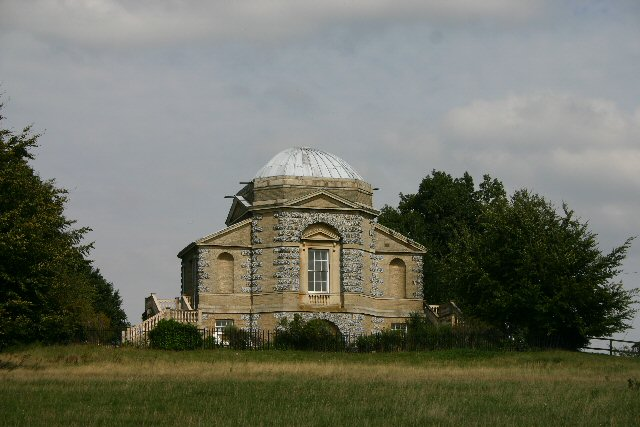
The Temple

The old park was designed by the diarist John Evelyn, a noted landscape gardener and an expert on trees, with a canal, straight rides and avenues. His designs for Euston included the walk through the pleasure grounds which can still be enjoyed today. The whole park and river layout was designed by William Kent in 1738, and is considered one of his great works. His temple and entrance archway survive.

Capability Brown worked at Euston intermittently from 1776 until his death in 1783. He remodelled water features for 3rd Duke of Grafton, expanding Kent's system of small lakes & rivulets into a large new lake, Broadwater, with a central island, designed to give views towards the house through trees. He built a weir to direct water from River Blackbourne into the lake and may have landscaped the river bank in front of Euston Hall & along the river to the south, and planted trees by the lodges on the western boundary of the estate.

Euston's watermill was built in the 1670s by Sir Samuel Morland for irrigation and grinding corn. In 1731, it was redesigned by William Kent to resemble a church, and in 1859 an iron waterwheel was added by Charles Burrell.

The Temple (not open to the public) is an unusual octagonal folly designed by William Kent in 1746. It was his last work. It has a magnificent octagonal banqueting hall rising to a dome.

The current house and grounds comprise about 110 acres of parkland and 65 acres of pleasure grounds. The landscaping underwent major restoration work in advance of the Capability Brown tercentenary in 2016.
