= Euston, Suffolk =

Village in Suffolk, England

Coordinates: 52.375°N 0.786°E

Euston
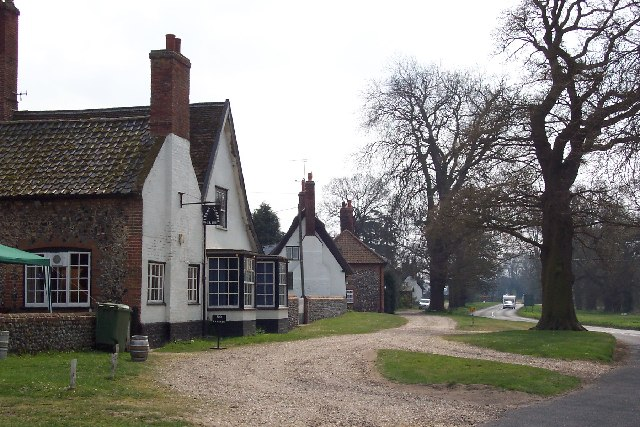

- Location within Suffolk
- Population: 130 (2005); 138 (2011)
- District: West Suffolk
- Shire county: Suffolk
- Region: East
- Country: England
- Sovereign state: United Kingdom
- Post town: Thetford
- Postcode district: IP24
- Dialling code: 01842
- Police: Suffolk
- Fire: Suffolk
- Ambulance: East of England
- UK Parliament: West Suffolk

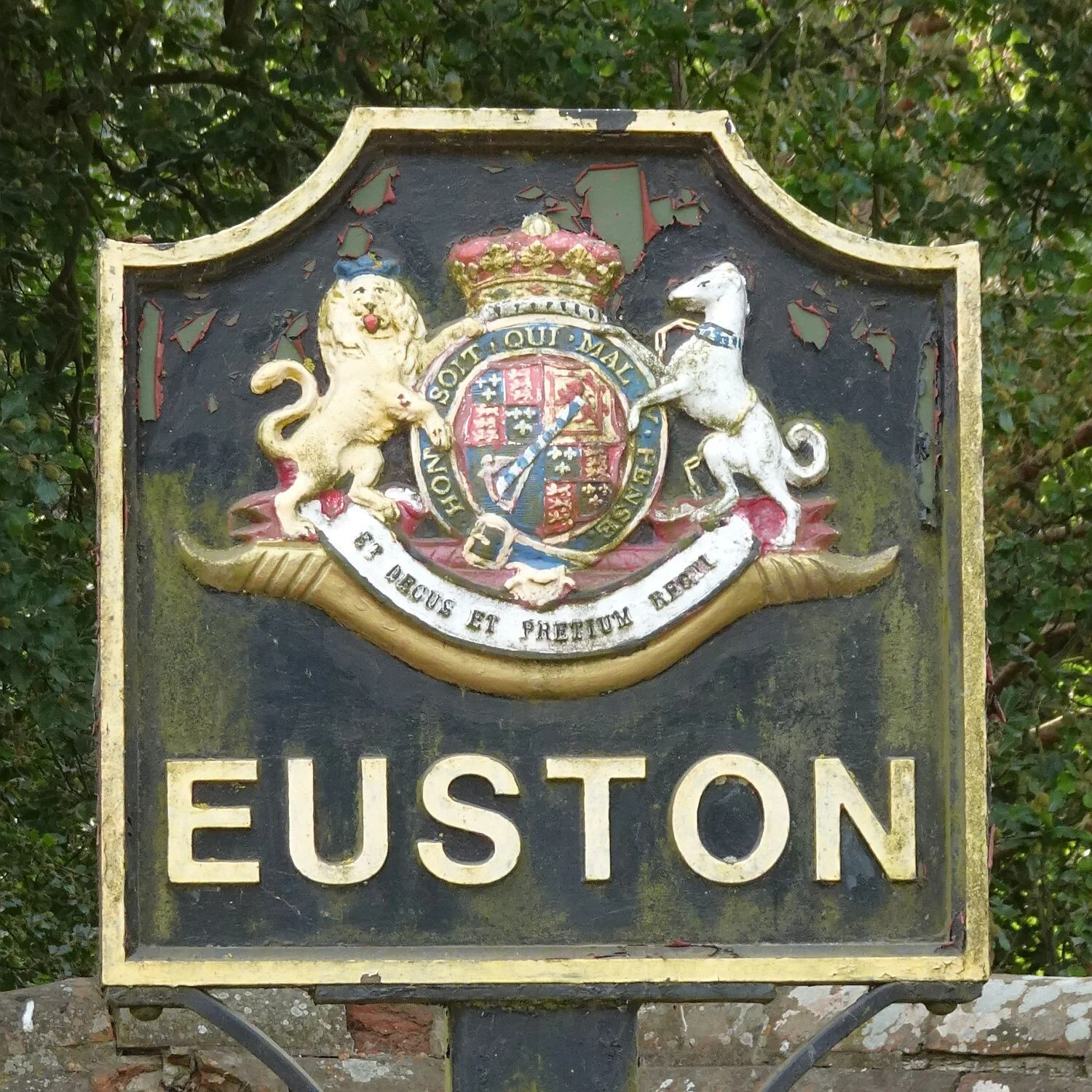
Euston Village Sign

Euston is a village and civil parish in the West Suffolk district of Suffolk in eastern England, on the A1088 two miles south of Thetford.

== Etymology ==
The name of the village was first recorded in Domesday Book, and may have been of Anglo-Saxon origin. It has been suggested that it is derived from "Efe's Tun", with "tun" referring to a farmstead and Efe being a personal name.

== Geography ==
The parish contains Euston Hall and the surrounding Euston Park designed by William Kent and Capability Brown, as well as the Fakenham Wood SSSI. The parish's northern border is the River Little Ouse, which marks the boundary between Norfolk and Suffolk. Euston Hall is the country seat of the Duke of Grafton.

== St Genevieve Church ==
The parish church in Euston Park is dedicated to Saint Genevieve. The foundation stone was laid by the Duchess of Grafton in 1676; it is the only church in Suffolk to have been built in the 17th century, and is on the site of an earlier medieval building. It has a four-stage tower and round headed windows in a style called "Venetian tracery". The interior is noted for the original wooden box pews, screen and pulpit. Some medieval brasses survive, as well as fine monuments to the Dukes of Grafton buried in the church and the adjacent churchyard. The church is a Grade I Listed building. It is open to the public in the summer months, but regular traditional Sunday services are held throughout the year. The Parish of Euston is part of the Blackbourne Team Ministry.

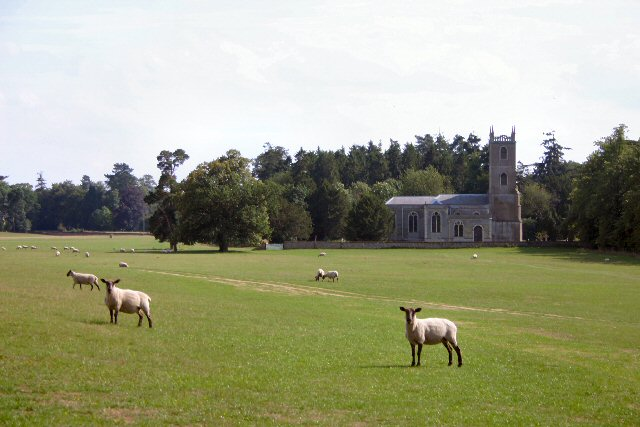
The Church of St Genevieve, Euston

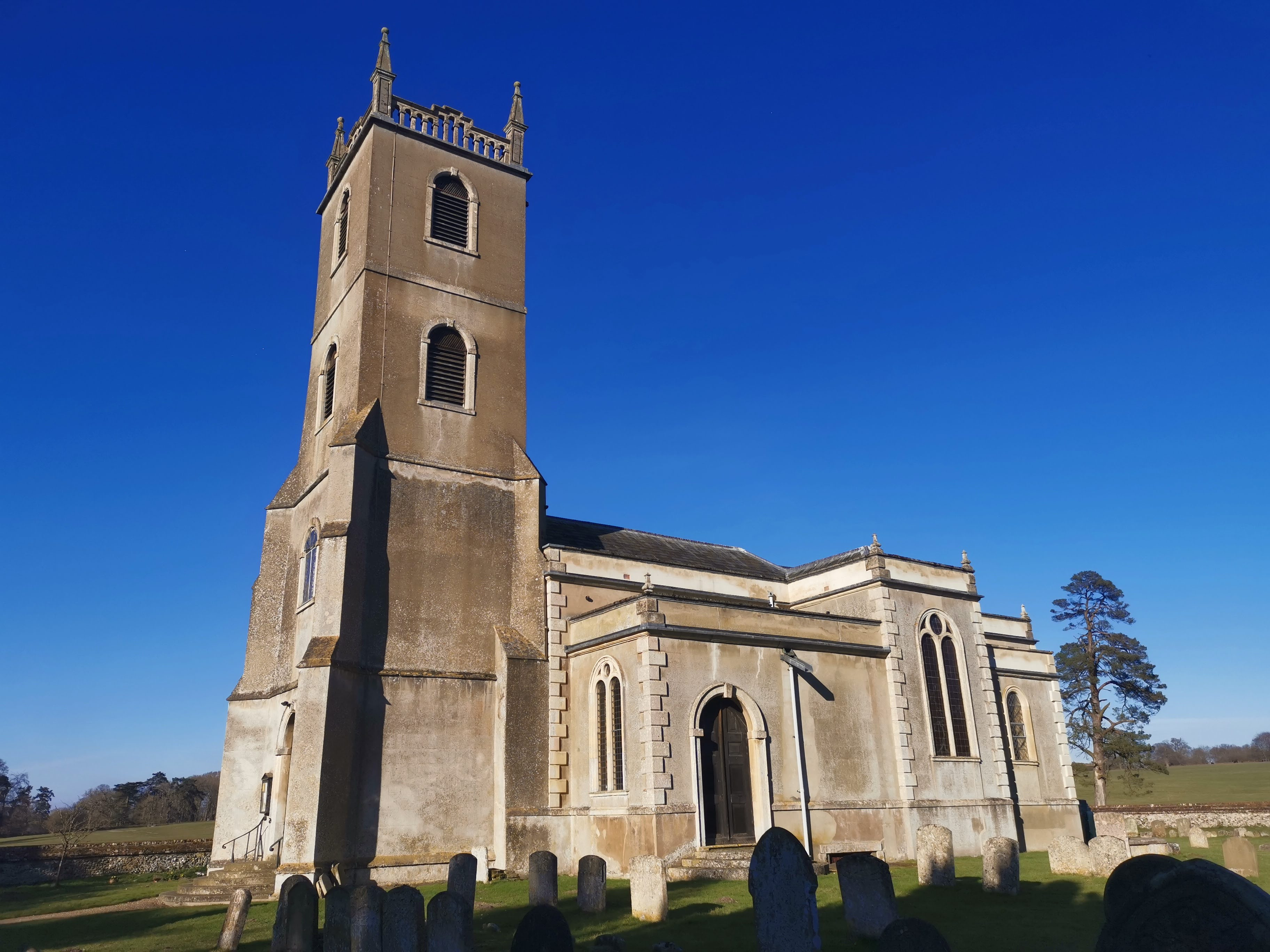
South side of Church of St Genevieve

== Other ==
The Icknield Way Path passes through the village on its 110-mile journey from Ivinghoe Beacon in Buckinghamshire to Knettishall Heath in Suffolk. The Icknield Way Trail, a multi-user route for walkers, horse riders and off-road cyclists also passes through the village.

Barnham Heath Site of Special Scientific Interest is on the western edge of the parish, which also includes land in the Breckland Farmland and Forest SSSI units.

Euston Park Endurance is a facility for endurance riding. The Endurance World Championships 2012 took place in Euston Park.
