= Clare FitzRoy, Countess of Euston =

British official (born 1951)

Countess of Euston
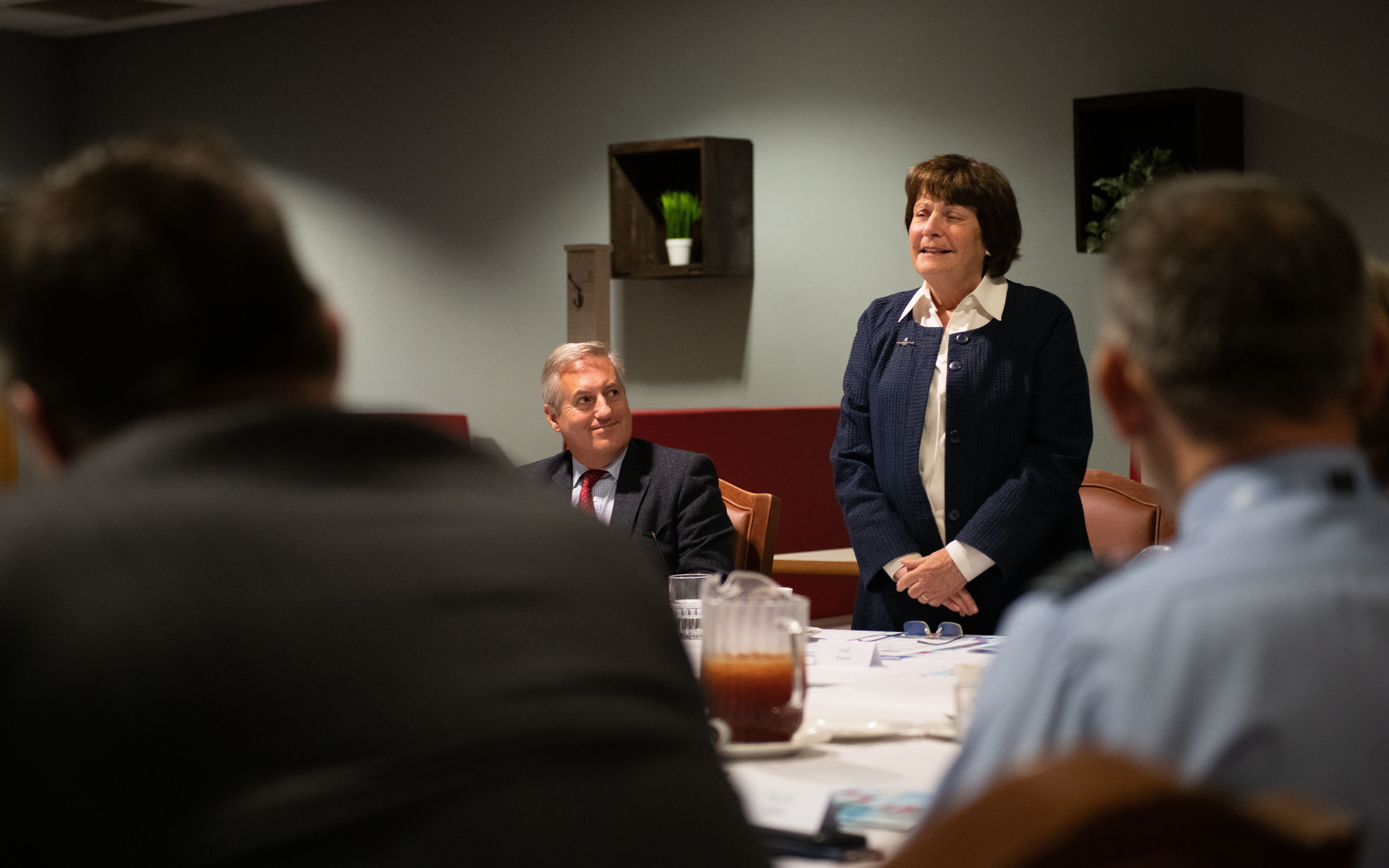
- Born: Lady Clare Amabel Margaret Kerr; 15 April 1951 (age 75); Jedburgh, Roxburghshire, Scotland
- Spouse: James, Earl of Euston (m. 1972; died 2009)
- Issue: Lady Louise Vaughan; Lady Emily FitzRoy; Henry FitzRoy, 12th Duke of Grafton; Lady Charlotte Hook; Lady Isobel FitzRoy
- Parents: The 12th Marquess of Lothian; Antonella Newland

Clare Amabel Margaret FitzRoy, Countess of Euston, CVO (née Kerr; born 15 April 1951), is a Scottish aristocrat who served as Lord Lieutenant of Suffolk from 2014 to 2026. She is also President of the Suffolk Agricultural Association with a particular interest in local breeds the Suffolk Punch horse and the Red Poll cow.

Born in Jedburgh as Lady Clare Kerr, Lady Euston is the fourth child of the 12th Marquess of Lothian and his wife, Antonella (née Newland)

Clare married James FitzRoy, Earl of Euston, son and heir apparent to the 11th Duke of Grafton, on 16 September 1972. Lord Euston predeceased his father in October 2009.

Lord and Lady Euston had five children:

- Lady Louise Helen Mary FitzRoy (born 11 June 1973)
- Lady Emily Clare FitzRoy (born 6 December 1974)
- Henry Oliver Charles FitzRoy, 12th Duke of Grafton (born 6 April 1978)
- Lady Charlotte Rose FitzRoy (born 10 March 1983)
- Lady Isobel Anne FitzRoy (born 1985)

Lady Euston served as Lord Lieutenant of Suffolk from 2014 to April 2026. She had previously been High Sheriff and Deputy Lieutenant of Suffolk.

Lady Euston was appointed a Companion of the Royal Victorian Order (CVO) in the 2025 Birthday Honours.

Honorary titles
Preceded by Lord Tollemache	Lord Lieutenant of Suffolk; 2014–present	Succeeded by Mark John Pendlington
