= Henry FitzRoy, 1st Duke of Grafton =

English royal bastard (1663–1690)

His Grace The Duke of Grafton KG
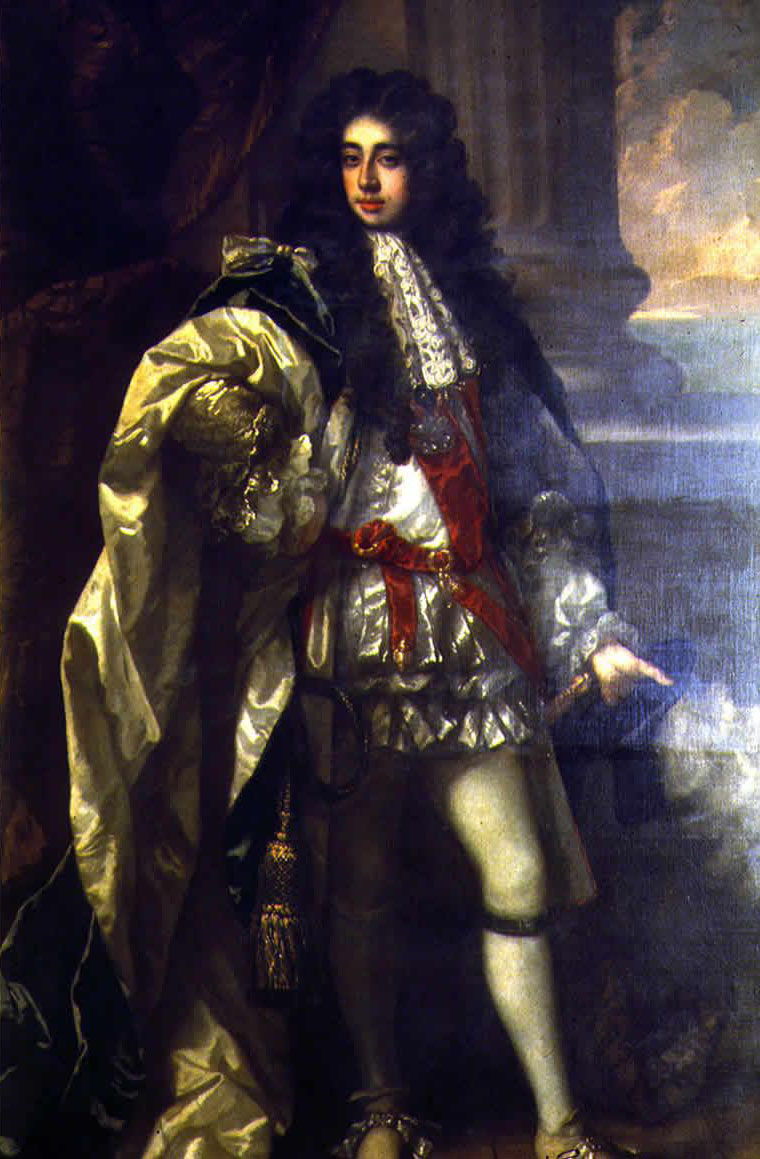

Vice-Admiral of England
- In office 1682–1689
- Preceded by: The Duke of Cumberland
- Succeeded by: The Earl of Torrington

Personal details
- Born: Henry FitzRoy; 28 September 1663
- Died: 9 October 1690 (aged 27) Cork, Ireland
- Spouse: Isabella Bennet, 2nd Countess of Arlington (m. 1672)
- Children: Charles FitzRoy, 2nd Duke of Grafton
- Parent(s): Charles II of England; Barbara Villiers, 1st Duchess of Cleveland

Henry FitzRoy, 1st Duke of Grafton (28 September 1663 – 9 October 1690) was an illegitimate son of King Charles II of England and his mistress Barbara Villiers. A military commander, Henry FitzRoy was appointed colonel of the Grenadier Guards in 1681 and Vice-Admiral of England from 1682 to 1689. He was killed in the storming of Cork during the Williamite–Jacobite War in 1690.

== Early life and military career ==
Born to Barbara Villiers, Countess of Castlemaine, on 28 September 1663, Henry FitzRoy was an illegitimate son of King Charles II of England, the second by Barbara Villiers. His mother was the daughter of William Villiers, 2nd Viscount Grandison, a colonel of one of King Charles I's regiments who was killed in action during the Civil War. On 1 August 1672, at the age of 8, marriage was arranged to the 5-year-old Isabella, daughter and heiress of Henry Bennet, 1st Earl of Arlington. A wedding ceremony took place on 4 November 1679 witnessed and recorded by John Evelyn in his diary of that date describing him as "exceedingly handsome, by far surpassing any of the Kings other naturall Issue". At the time of his marriage, Henry FitzRoy was created Baron Sudbury, Viscount Ipswich, and Earl of Euston. In 1675, he was created Duke of Grafton, and Charles II made him a Knight of the Order of the Garter in 1680. He was appointed colonel of the Grenadier Guards in 1681.

FitzRoy was brought up as a sailor and saw military action at the siege of Luxembourg in 1684. In that year, he received a warrant to supersede Sir Robert Holmes as Governor of the Isle of Wight, when the latter was charged with making false musters. However, Holmes was acquitted by court-martial and retained the governorship. In 1686, he killed John Talbot, brother of the Earl of Shrewsbury, in a duel; Talbot having given Grafton some "unhandsome and provoking language". He was appointed Vice-Admiral of the Narrow Seas from 1685 to 1687. At King James II's coronation, Grafton was Lord High Constable. During the rebellion of the Duke of Monmouth he commanded the royal troops in Somerset. However, he later acted with John Churchill, and joined William of Orange to overthrow the King in the Glorious Revolution of 1688.

== Death ==
FitzRoy died in Ireland on 9 October 1690 of a wound received at the storming of Cork while leading William's forces, aged 27. His body was returned to England for burial—with some internal organs removed and buried (in Ballintemple, Cork) to preserve his remains for transport.

In October 1697, his widow, Isabella, married Sir Thomas Hanmer, a young Flintshire baronet, who became Speaker of the House of Commons and an authority on the works of William Shakespeare. She died in 1723.

== Legacy ==
The Duke of Grafton owned land in what was then countryside near Dublin, Ireland, which later became part of the city. A country lane on this land eventually developed into Grafton Street, one of Dublin's main streets. Grafton Alley in Cork, close to where he was shot, also bears his name.

Through his son, Charles, he is an ancestor of the late Diana, Princess of Wales.

== Arms ==
Coat of arms of Henry FitzRoy, 1st Duke of Grafton
| Coronet A Coronet of a Duke Crest On a Chapeau Gules turned up Ermine a Lion statant guardant Or ducally crowned Azure and gorged with a Collar counter-compony Argent and of the fourth. Escutcheon The Royal Arms of Charles II, viz Quarterly: 1st and 4th, France and England quarterly; 2nd, Scotland; 3rd, Ireland; the whole debruised by a Baton sinister compony of six pieces Argent and Azure. Supporters Dexter: a Lion guardant Or ducally crowned Azure; Sinister: a Greyhound Argent, each gorged with a Collar counter-compony Argent and Azure. Motto Et Decus Et Pretium Recti (Latin: "The ornament and recompense of virtue") |

== Notes and references ==
Political offices
| Preceded by The Duke of Cumberland | Vice-Admiral of England; 1682–1689 | Succeeded by The Earl of Torrington |
Honorary titles
| Vacant Title last held by The Earl of Northumberland | Lord High Constable of England; 1685 | Vacant Title next held by The Duke of Ormonde |
| Preceded by The Earl of Arlington | Lord Lieutenant of Suffolk; 1685–1689 | Succeeded by The Lord Cornwallis |
Military offices
| Preceded by John Russell | Colonel of the 1st Regiment of Foot Guards; 1681–1688 | Succeeded by The Earl of Lichfield |
| Preceded by The Earl of Lichfield | Colonel of the 1st Regiment of Foot Guards; 1688–1689 | Succeeded by Henry Sydney |
Peerage of England
| New creation | Duke of Grafton; 1675–1690 | Succeeded by Charles FitzRoy |
| New creation | Earl of Euston; 1672–1690 | Succeeded by Charles FitzRoy |
