= Sir Dudley Forwood, 2nd Baronet =

English soldier

Sir Arthur Forwood Bt CMG

Personal details
- Born: Dudley Baines Forwood; 31 May 1875
- Died: 22 December 1961 (aged 86)
- Spouse: Norah Isabella Lockett (m. 1901; died 1961)
- Children: 2
- Parent(s): Sir Arthur Forwood, 1st Baronet; Mary Anne Eliza Baines
- Relatives: William Bower Forwood (uncle)
- Education: Harrow School
- Occupation: Soldier

Sir Dudley Baines Forwood, 2nd Baronet CMG (31 May 1875 – 22 December 1961) was an English soldier and baronet.

== Early life ==
Forwood was born on 31 May 1875. He was the eldest son of Sir Arthur Forwood, 1st Baronet and, his second wife, Mary Anne Eliza Baines. They lived at The Priory, Gateacre, Liverpool. From his father's first marriage to Lucy Crosfield (niece of Joseph Crosfield), he had three elder half-sisters. Lucy died in 1873, and the next year his father married his mother, and had they had four sons and a daughter. His father, a wealthy merchant who was the Conservative MP for Ormskirk, served as Parliamentary and Financial Secretary to the Admiralty from 1886 to 1892.

His paternal grandparents were merchant Thomas Brittain Forwood and Charlotte (née Bower) Forwood, the daughter of a cotton broker. His uncle was the merchant, shipowner and politician William Bower Forwood. His maternal grandparents were Frances "Fanny" (née Higgins) Baines and the journalist and historian Thomas Baines, FRS, of Liverpool and of London. Through his maternal aunt, Frances Jane Baines, the wife of industrialist Edmund Knowles Muspratt, he was a first cousin of Suffragists, Nessie Stewart-Brown, Julia Solly, and Liberal MP, Max Muspratt.

He was educated at Harrow School.

== Career ==
Upon the death of his father, he succeeded as the 2nd Baronet Forwood on 27 September 1898. He fought in World War I, where he was mentioned in despatches. He gained the rank of Major and Honorary Lieutenant-Colonel in the 2nd Lancashire Royal Field Artillery. He gained the rank of Lieutenant-Colonel in the Royal Field Artillery. He was appointed Companion, Order of St Michael and St George in 1919. He was Master of the New Forest Buck Hounds between 1950 and 1957.

== Personal life ==
On 24 July 1901, Forwood was married to Norah Isabella Lockett (1875–1962), daughter of Richard Robertson Lockett and Isabella Paterson. Together, they were the parents of two sons:

- Arthur Dudley Forwood (1908–1908), who died in infancy.
- Sir Dudley Richard Forwood, 3rd Baronet (1912–2001), who was sole equerry to the Duke of Windsor after his abdication in 1937 until the outbreak of war in 1939; he married, as her fourth husband, Mary Gwendoline Foster, daughter of Basil Samuel Foster and Gwendoline Brogden, in 1952. She was previously married to Inigo Freeman-Thomas, 2nd Marquess of Willingdon (when he was Viscount Ratendone), Frederick Robert Cullingford, (Note: From her marriage to Frederick Robert Cullingford, she was the mother of Rodney Simon Dudley Cullingford (1940–1999), who changed his name to Rodney Simon Dudley Forwood by deed poll. He married Jennifer Jane Nelson, Baroness Arlington, daughter of Maj.-Gen. Sir Eustace John Blois Nelson and Lady Margaret Jane FitzRoy (sister of the 9th Duke of Grafton and granddaughter of the 8th Duke of Grafton), in 1964.) and Brig. Donald Croft-Wilcock.

Sir Dudley died on 22 December 1961 and was succeeded in the baronetcy by his only surviving son, Dudley.

Baronetage of the United Kingdom
Preceded by Arthur Bower Forwood	Baronet (of The Priory); 1898 – 1961	Succeeded by Dudley Richard Forwood
