= Sir Dudley Forwood, 3rd Baronet =

English courtier and soldier

Sir Arthur Forwood Bt

Personal details
- Born: Dudley Baines Forwood; 6 June 1912
- Died: 25 January 2001 (aged 88)
- Spouse: Mary Croft-Wilcock (m. 1952; died 1999)
- Parent(s): Sir Dudley Forwood, 2nd Baronet; Norah Isabella Lockett
- Education: Stowe School
- Occupation: Soldier

Sir Dudley Richard Forwood, 3rd Baronet (6 June 1912 – 25 January 2001) was an English diplomat and courtier who was sole equerry to the Duke of Windsor after his abdication in 1937 until the outbreak of war in 1939.

== Early life ==
Forwood was born on 6 June 1912 into an old Lancashire family who had made their wealth in Liverpool from shipping. He was the son of Sir Dudley Baines Forwood, 2nd Baronet and Norah Isabella Lockett.

His paternal grandparents were Sir Arthur Forwood, 1st Baronet, (Note: His grandfather, Sir Arthur Forwood, 1st Baronet, for whom the baronetcy was created in 1895, was the Conservative MP for Ormskirk, and served as Parliamentary and Financial Secretary to the Admiralty from 1886 to 1892.) and, his second wife, Mary Anne Eliza Baines (a daughter of journalist Thomas Baines). His maternal grandparents were Richard Robertson Lockett and Isabella (née Paterson) Lockett.

He was educated at Stowe School in Buckingham and then joined the reserve of the Scots Guards as a subaltern.

== Career ==
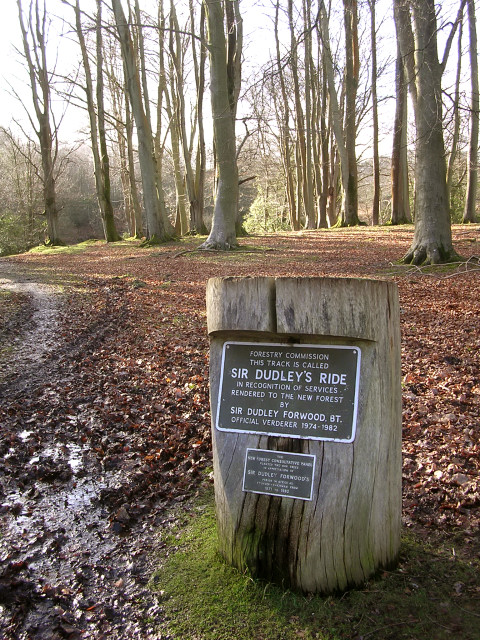
Start of Sir Dudley's Ride, New Forest. This plaque marks the start of a forest track named "Sir Dudley's Ride" to the west of the Old House.

Between 1934 and 1937, he was honorary attaché at the British Legation in Vienna under Sir Walford Selby. After his service with the Windsors, he joined the Scots Guards during World War II, gaining the rank of Temporary Major in the Scots Guards Reserve of Officers.

After the war, he became a farmer in the New Forest and, upon the death of his father, succeeded as the 3rd Baronet Forwood on 22 December 1961. He was Master of the New Forest Buckhounds from 1956 to 1965, chairman of the New Forest and Hampshire County Show from 1964 to 1978, and the New Forest Consultative Panel from 1970 to 1982.

From 1974 to 1982, he was Official Verderer of the New Forest, presiding over the Verderers' Courts which governed the area. With his wife, he was a breeder of Cavalier King Charles Spaniels. He also served as chairman of Crufts dog show from 1973 to 1987.

=== Equerry to the Duke of Windsor ===
In 1934, while honorary attaché in Vienna, Forwood was asked to serve as aide-de-camp to Prince Edward, the Prince of Wales, during his skiing holiday with Wallis Simpson at the Grand Hotel, Kitzbühel, in Austria. Immediately after the Abdication in 1936, the now Duke of Windsor went to stay at Schloss Enzesfeld in Austria, which was owned by Baron Eugène von Rothschild. The Duke summoned Forwood to Enzesfeld. The Duke's two equerries had left, Sir Piers Legh and the Hon. John Aird, who was recalled to Buckingham Palace by the King, and he asked Forwood to become his equerry. Forwood accepted, earning £400 a year, and dealt with the Duke's official correspondence and with the running of his household, as well as being responsible for arranging the Duke's marriage to Wallis Simpson at the Château de Candé in France in 1937.

Forwood attended the couple on a trip to Venice where Mussolini planned an escort of gondolas to accompany the party to the Lido. Also that year, he went on the 1937 tour of Germany by the Duke and Duchess of Windsor and was present when the Duke and Duchess met Adolf Hitler at Obersalzberg, above Berchtesgaden. Upon the Windsors move to Paris in 1939, Forwood joined them at their new house at 24 Boulevard Suchet. While there, his duties included escorting the Duchess while she called on various English residents in Paris. Forwood left the Windsor's service in 1939 when he was summoned back to the Scots Guards.

== Personal life ==
On 27 May 1952, he was married to Mary Croft-Wilcock (née Foster), the daughter of Basil Samuel Foster and Gwendoline Brogden. She was previously married to Inigo Freeman-Thomas, 2nd Marquess of Willingdon (when he was styled Viscount Ratendone), Frederick Robert Cullingford, and Brig. Donald Croft-Wilcock. From her marriage to Cullingford, she was the mother of Rodney Simon Dudley Cullingford (1940–1999). Upon Forwood adopting him, Rodney changed his name to Rodney Simon Dudley Forwood by deed poll. He married Jennifer Jane Nelson, Baroness Arlington, daughter of Maj.-Gen. Sir Eustace John Blois Nelson and Lady Margaret Jane FitzRoy (sister of the 9th Duke of Grafton and granddaughter of the 8th Duke of Grafton), in 1964.

Lady Forwood died in 1999. Sir Dudley died on 25 January 2001. As his adopted stepson could not inherit the baronetcy, it passed to his cousin, Peter Noel Forwood. Upon the 4th Baronet's death in 2019, the baronetcy became extinct.

Baronetage of the United Kingdom
Preceded by Dudley Baines Forwood	Baronet (of The Priory); 1961 – 2001	Succeeded by Peter Noel Forwood
