= Basil Foster =

English actor and cricketer (1882–1959)

Basil Samuel Foster
Personal information
- Born: 12 February 1882; Malvern, Worcestershire, England
- Died: 28 September 1959 (aged 77); Hillingdon, Middlesex, England
- Batting: Right-handed

Career statistics
Competition	First-class
Matches	34
Runs scored	753
Batting average	14.76
100s/50s	0/2
Top score	86
Balls bowled	81
Wickets	0
Bowling average	–
5 wickets in innings	–
10 wickets in match	–
Best bowling	–
Catches/stumpings	32/–
- Source: Cricinfo, 8 November 2022
- Foster as Vernon in The Sunshine Girl (1912), with Phyllis Dare as Delia
- Occupations: Actor; Theatre manager
- Spouse(s): Gwendoline Brogden (m. 1910, divorced) Lillian F. Norton
- Children: 1
- Military career
- Branch: British Army
- Unit: 2/8th Hampshire Territorials
- Conflicts: World War I

Basil Samuel Foster (12 February 1882 – 28 September 1959) was an English actor and cricketer who played 34 first-class matches in the early 20th century. He was the inspiration for the Wodehouse character, Catsmeat Potter-Pirbright, having become a stage actor so that he could also play county cricket.

== Early life ==
Foster was born in Malvern, Worcestershire on 12 February 1882. He was one of eleven children, seven sons and four daughters, of Henry Foster and Sophia Mary (née Harper) Foster. Among his siblings were Geoffrey Norman Foster, Henry Knollys "Harry" Foster, Maurice Kirshaw Foster, Neville John Acland Foster, Reginald Erskine "Tip" Foster and Wilfrid Lionel "Bill" Foster. Basil and his brothers were all educated at Malvern College.

== Career ==
During World War I, Foster was machine-gun instructor to the 2/8th Hampshire Territorials.

=== Cricket career ===
One of the seven Foster brothers who played for Worcestershire, he made his first-class debut for that county against Kent in August 1902, but scored only 4 and 0 as Worcestershire lost by nine wickets. He played against Surrey a few days later, taking three catches, and against Hampshire the following June, but made ducks in both his innings.

Foster did not play first-class cricket again until 1906, when he made 27 and 26 for Marylebone Cricket Club (MCC) against Worcestershire at Lord's. Between then and early May 1912, he played mostly for MCC, making 15 appearances for them in all while turning out only four more times for Worcestershire. It was for MCC that he made his two half-centuries: 86 (from number eight) against the South Africans in 1907, and 74 against Leicestershire in 1910.

After his last match for MCC, Foster returned to county cricket, but now, living in London, with Middlesex. For his new county he made 12 first-class appearances, but in 15 innings never scored more than 35. His final game came against Kent in late August, but only one day's play was possible in the match and Foster made just 8 in his only innings before being caught and bowled by Woolley.

=== Actor ===
Foster made his stage debut in 1906, as Norman Popple in Mr Popple of Ippleton by Paul Rubens, at the Marlborough Theatre, Holloway, London. In The Dollar Princess of 1909, the Daily Mirror critic wrote that Foster (Earl of Quorn) and Gabrielle Ray (Daisy) "make a fine pair, and play to each other splendidly."

In 1907, Foster played cricket against P.G. Wodehouse in the Actors against Authors game at Lord's. Foster later collaborated with Wodehouse, portraying the lead role, in the 1928 New Theatre production of A Damsel in Distress, as well as the role of Psmith in the 1930 Shaftesbury Theatre production of Leave It to Psmith; both productions were adapted by Wodehouse and Ian Hay from novels written by Wodehouse.

Foster became manager of the Richmond Theatre in 1939.

== Personal life ==
On 12 June 1910 at Hampstead, Foster was married to actress Gwendoline Brogden. Before their divorce, they were the parents of one daughter:

- Mary Gwendoline Foster (1916–1999), who married, as his second wife, Inigo Freeman-Thomas, 2nd Marquess of Willingdon (when he was styled Viscount Ratendone) in 1934. They divorced in 1939 and she married Frederick Robert Cullingford. They divorced and she married Brig. Donald Croft-Wilcock in 1944. They too divorced and she married Sir Dudley Forwood, 3rd Baronet in 1952.

After his divorce from Brogden, he married Lillian F. Norton. They too divorced.

Foster died in Pield Heath, Hillingdon, Middlesex, aged 77.

=== Descendants ===
Through his daughter Mary, he was a grandfather of Rodney Simon Dudley Cullingford (1940–1999), who was adopted by her fourth husband, Sir Dudley Forwood, 3rd Baronet. Upon Forwood adopting him, Rodney changed his name to Rodney Simon Dudley Forwood by deed poll. He married Jennifer Jane Nelson, Baroness Arlington, daughter of Maj.-Gen. Sir Eustace John Blois Nelson and Lady Margaret Jane FitzRoy (sister of the 9th Duke of Grafton and granddaughter of the 8th Duke of Grafton), in 1964.
