= Dudley Forwood =

Dudley Forwood may refer to:

- Sir Dudley Forwood, 2nd Baronet (1875–1961), English soldier
- Sir Dudley Forwood, 3rd Baronet (1912–2001), English diplomat and courtier
