= Baron Arlington =

Barony in the Peerage of England

Barony of Arlington
- Creation date: 1672
- Created by: Charles II of England
- Peerage: Peerage of England
- First holder: Sir Henry Bennet
- Present holder: Jennifer Forwood, 11th Baroness Arlington (Baroness Arlington)
- Heir apparent: Patrick John Dudley Forwood
- Remainder to: grantee's heirs of the body lawfully begotten

Baron Arlington is a title in the Peerage of England which was created, on 14 March 1665, for Sir Henry Bennet, younger brother of John Bennet, 1st Baron Ossulston. In 1672, he was made Earl of Arlington and Viscount Thetford, and was regranted the title of Baron Arlington, with a special remainder allowing it to pass to both male and female descendants, rather than only heirs male, as was customary with most peerages. Its territorial designation is the birthplace of its first holder Harlington, London, which was also known as Arlington.

The 11th Baroness Arlington was the last woman to take her seat in the House of Lords under the provisions of the Peerage Act 1963. She became a member of the Lords on 27 May 1999 and remained in the House until 11 November 1999, when the House of Lords Act 1999 took effect.

== Co-descent with the dukedom of Grafton ==
The first Earl of Arlington died, as anticipated, without male heirs so the titles went to his daughter Isabella. At age five, Isabella was engaged to Henry FitzRoy, the illegitimate son of Charles II of England and his mistress Barbara Villiers. Henry would be created Duke of Grafton in 1679. Their son Charles inherited the Arlington and Grafton substantive titles.

The two titles continued united until the death of the 9th Duke in a high-speed racecar accident in 1936.

== Separation from Dukedom ==
The Grafton dukedom passed to a cousin yet the three Arlington/Thetford titles fell into abeyance under the principle of moieties between his two sisters, neither of whom petitioned the Sovereign to terminate this. After the death of the elder sister, her eldest child Jennifer petitioned the Sovereign, and the abeyance of the barony of Arlington was terminated in her favour, restoring it upon her, rather than her aunt's descendants. The earldom of Arlington, however, remains abeyant, along with the viscountcy of Thetford.

== Abeyance of senior titles ==
Of peerages in the United Kingdom, the earldom of Arlington and the viscounty of Thetford are rare examples of a title with a higher rank than baron falling into abeyance, another case being that of the earldom of Cromartie in 1893.

== Barons Arlington (1672) ==

- Henry Bennet, 1st Earl of Arlington (1618–1685)
- Isabella FitzRoy, Duchess of Grafton, 2nd Countess of Arlington (c. 1668–1723)
- Charles FitzRoy, 2nd Duke of Grafton, 3rd Earl of Arlington (1683–1757)
- Augustus Henry FitzRoy, 3rd Duke of Grafton, 4th Earl of Arlington (1735–1811)
- George Henry FitzRoy, 4th Duke of Grafton, 5th Earl of Arlington (1760–1844)
- Henry FitzRoy, 5th Duke of Grafton, 6th Earl of Arlington (1790–1863)
- William Henry FitzRoy, 6th Duke of Grafton, 7th Earl of Arlington (1819–1882)
- Augustus Charles Lennox FitzRoy, 7th Duke of Grafton, 8th Earl of Arlington (1821–1918)
- Alfred William Maitland FitzRoy, 8th Duke of Grafton, 9th Earl of Arlington (1850–1930)
- John Charles William FitzRoy, 9th Duke of Grafton, 10th Earl of Arlington (1914–1936) (abeyant 1936)
- Jennifer Jane Forwood, 11th Baroness Arlington (b. 1939) (abeyance terminated 1999)
  - The heir apparent is the present holder's elder son Patrick John Dudley Forwood (b. 1967)
    - The next heir-in-line is his younger brother James Roland Nelson Forwood (b. 1969).

== Co-heirs to the earldom of Arlington and the viscountcy of Thetford (in abeyance) ==
- Jennifer Forwood, 11th Baroness Arlington (b. 1939)
- Sir Frederick Sebastian Cholmeley (b. 1968)
- Linda Jane Auriol Williams (b. 1947)

== See also ==
- Baron Ossulston
- House of Lords
