= Roland Nelson =

English barrister and rower

Roland Hugh Nelson (7 February 1881 – 19 December 1940) was an English barrister and rower who won Silver Goblets at Henley Royal Regatta.

Nelson was born in London, the son of John Henry Nelson of Stanhope Gardens. He was educated at Eton and Trinity College, Cambridge. At Cambridge he was a member of the Pitt Club. He rowed for Cambridge in the Boat Race in 1901, 1902 and 1903 and Cambridge won the race in 1902 and 1903. In 1905 he won the Silver Goblets at Henley Royal Regatta with P H Thomas.

Nelson was called to the Bar, at Inner Temple in June 1906. He was private secretary to the First Lord of the Admiralty from 1909 to 1911, to the Home Secretary from 1912 to 1913 and to the First Lord of the Admiralty again from 1914 to 1916. Office holders in this period were Reginald McKenna and Winston Churchill.

Nelson lived at Chilterns End, Henley-on-Thames and died in London at the age of 59.

Nelson married Hylda Letitia Grace Blois, daughter of Sir John Ralph Blois, 8th Baronet and Eliza Ellen Chapman, on 11 June 1908. He was the father of Major General Sir Eustace John Blois Nelson and grandfather of Jennifer Forwood, 11th Baroness Arlington

== See also ==
- List of Cambridge University Boat Race crews
