= Horcher (restaurant) =

Restaurant in Madrid

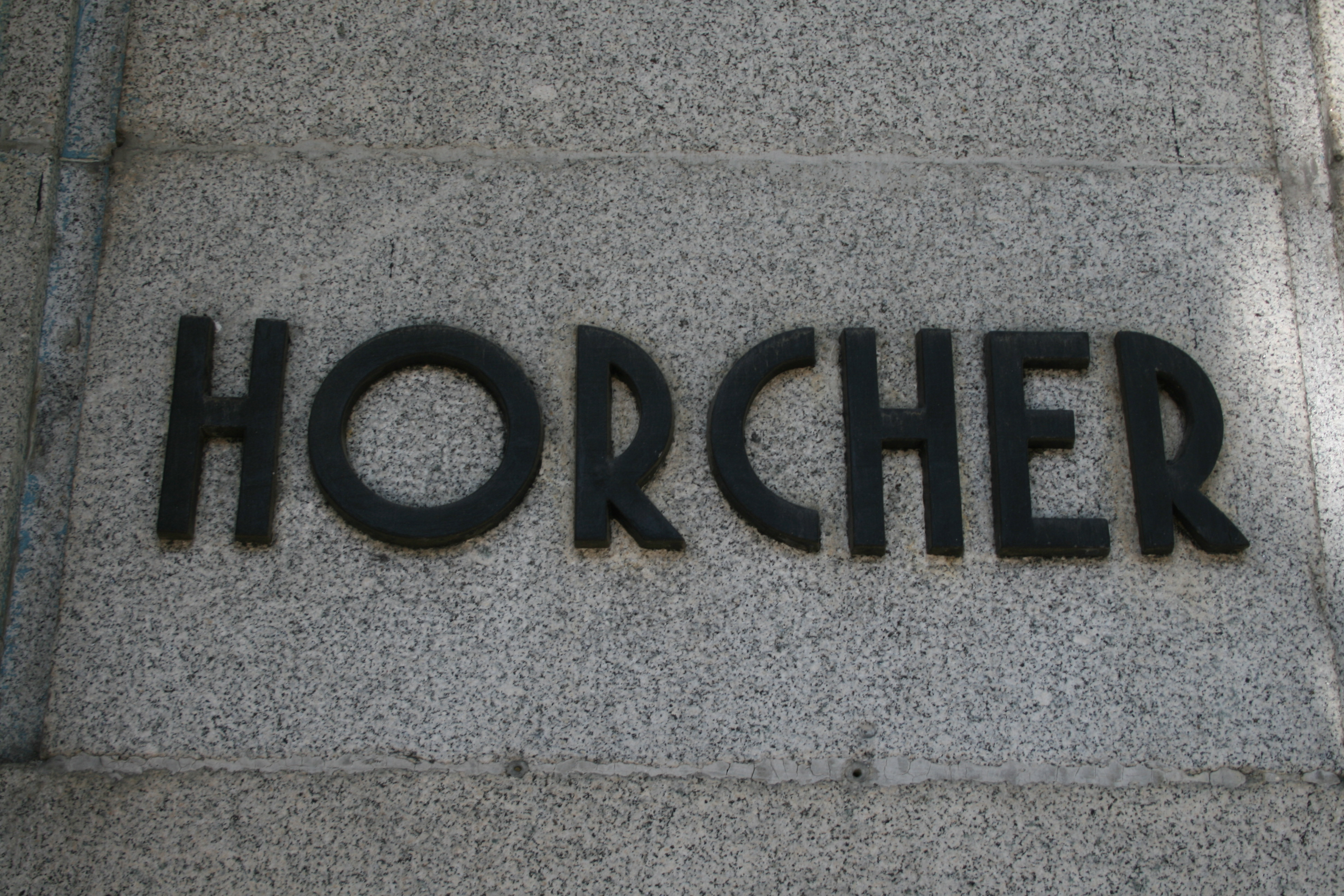
- The Horcher logo in Madrid
- Interactive map of Horcher

Restaurant information
- Established: 1904; 122 years ago
- Food type: German cuisine
- Dress code: Business smart
- Location: 6 Calle de Alfonso XII, Madrid, 28014, Spain
- Other information: Nearest station: Banco de España
- Website: Official website

Horcher is a restaurant in Madrid, Spain. It moved to Madrid in 1943 having originally opened in Berlin, Germany, in 1904. It was a popular restaurant with the elite of Nazi Germany.

== History ==
=== In Berlin ===
During World War I Horcher served game meat from the Black Forest, food that was exempt from wartime rationing restrictions.

In her diary Blood and Banquets, Bella Fromm wrote that "Even before 1933, [Horcher's] was largely patronized by the Nazi leaders"

In 1934 Hermann Göring, Heinrich Himmler, and other senior Nazis dined on crab at a celebratory meal at Horcher, following the Night of the Long Knives. Edward, Duke of Windsor, and Wallis, Duchess of Windsor dined at Horcher on the first night of their tour of Germany in 1937. They were joined by the Foreign Minister Joachim von Ribbentrop for dinner. The night was attended by Albert Speer (with whom the Windsors discussed classical music) and Joseph and Magda Goebbels.

Horcher opened a branch in London in March 1938.

The staff of Horcher were exempt from conscription during World War II.

During lunch at Horcher in December 1939, German diplomat Hasso von Etzdorf told Prince Otto von Bismarck and Raoul Wallenberg of Adolf Hitler's plans to invade Denmark and Norway.

British double agent Duško Popov was told by his German case officer Johnny Jebsen that there were hidden microphones in the flower vases at Horcher during a 1941 meal.

Horcher closed following Joseph Goebbels's 1943 Total War speech during World War II. Goebbels announced the closure of restaurants in the speech, saying that "It may be that an occasional person thinks that, even during war, his stomach is the most important thing. We cannot pay him any heed". Horcher's was the favourite restaurant of Hermann Göring, who dined there free of charge. Göring would entertain guests there and frequently hired Horcher's as caterers for his events. The historian Nicholas O'Shaughnessy has interpreted the closure of Horcher's by Goebbels as part of power struggles between Goebbels and Göring.

The first act of Carl Zuckmayer's 1946 play The Devil's General is set at Horcher.

=== In Madrid ===
Göring assisted with the moving of the restaurant to Madrid. The escape of senior Nazis from Europe in the aftermath of the war, dubbed the Ratlines, was planned at Horcher's, often by Charles Lescat. Horcher is believed to have transferred 250,000 Swiss francs to Nazi German diplomats in Lisbon and then subsequently converted the Swiss notes into Spanish pesetas to facilitate the opening of his restaurant in Madrid. A letter drop was established at Horcher's for German spies in Madrid. The Counterintelligence Corps of the United States Army described Otto Horcher as having moved to Madrid to "establish a centre of German subversive and espionage activities...the restaurant, after the war, became the collecting and distributing point for Germans who fled to Spain". Otto Skorzeny dined at Horcher's in Madrid with Hjalmar Schacht after the war.

In his 1979 memoir, My Stomach Goes Traveling, the actor Walter Slezak wrote that Horcher's was "The best restaurant in Madrid...There food is regarded as a religion". Notable patrons of Horcher's included Salvador Dalí, Ernest Hemingway and Sophia Loren.

In 2003 Fodor's guide to Madrid wrote of Horcher's that "Once Madrid's best restaurant, this classic at the edge of the Retiro is now widely considered little more than an overpriced reminder of its former glory".

As of 2019 Horcher's was owned by a member of the fourth generation of the Horcher family, Elisabeth Horcher. The historian Giles MacDonogh said of Horcher's that "There is no other restaurant in the history of the twentieth — or indeed any — century...that has relocated from one European capital to another without losing a jot of its social exclusivity". In a 2018 interview with El Confidencial, Elisabeth Horcher referred to her grandparents as "survivors" who had "...had to live through a very convulsive time. They had to leave their country...My grandparents were not supporters of the regime". Elisabeth Horcher's historical novel her family's story, Los Horcher, was published in 2018.

In a 2019 article in The Washington Post the novelist Diana Spechler described Horcher's "revisionist history-chic decor" and an "open-arms policy [that] is as charming as it is discomfiting. Though restaurateurs aren't obligated to police their customers' decency, egalitarian treatment becomes ethically murky against politically perilous backdrops".

== Cuisine ==
The novelist Diana Spechler ate at Horcher's with a companion for a 2019 article in The Washington Post. Their meal began with vichyssoise, followed by kartoffelpuffer with 'fermented herring in cream sauce', deep-fried crab and stroganoff, with baumkuchen was served for dessert, praised by the waiter as the "star" of Horcher.
