= Forwood baronets =

Extinct baronetcy in the Baronetage of the United Kingdom

The Forwood baronetcy, of The Priory, Gateacre, in the parish of Childwall in the County Palatine of Lancaster, was a title in the Baronetage of the United Kingdom. It was created on 5 September 1895 for the Conservative politician Sir Arthur Forwood, 1st Baronet, son of Thomas Friend Brittain Peploe Forwood of Thornton Manor, and brother of Sir William Bower Forwood and Ernest Harrison Forwood. He served as Parliamentary and Financial Secretary to the Admiralty from 1886 to 1892.

The baronetcy became extinct on the death of the 4th Baronet in 2019.

== Forwood baronets, of The Priory (1895) ==
- Sir Arthur Bower Forwood, 1st Baronet (1836–1898)
- Sir Dudley Baines Forwood, 2nd Baronet (1875–1961)
- Sir Dudley Richard Forwood, 3rd Baronet (1912–2001)
- Sir Peter Noel Forwood, 4th Baronet (1925–2019)

== Arms ==
Coat of arms of Forwood baronets

Crest
Between two wings Argent the battlements of a tower thereon in front of a stag's head two hatchets in saltire Proper.
Escutcheon
Per fess Or and Azure in chief a cormorant Sable beaked and legged Gules between two fleurs-de-lis of the second and in base an ancient ship with three masts of the first sail Argent colours flying of the fourth.

Baronetage of the United Kingdom
Preceded by Renals baronets	Forwood baronets of The Priory; 5 September 1895	Succeeded by Fayrer baronets
