= Limerick Grand Prix =

Car race in Ireland

The Limerick Grand Prix ran on the streets of Limerick, Ireland, between 1935–1938 (except 1937). The race was a milestone in Irish Grand Prix racing, as it was the first time an ERA racing car came to Ireland. ERA was the only British manufacturer to specialise in building Grand Prix cars at the time and was one of the top teams in the 1930s. The 2.76 miles (4.44 km) long route included William St, Roxborough Road, Careys Road, Rossbrien Road, Punches Cross, O'Connell Avenue and back down O'Connell St.

== Teams ==
Several major teams were represented, including well-known car manufacturers such as Alfa Romeo, Ford, Fiat, Austin, MG, Bugatti and Maserati.

Other entries came from less well-known manufacturers such as Adler, Alta, Lea Francis, Riley, Sunbeam and Frazer Nash.

== Race results ==
1935

1st Luis Fontés Alfa Romeo 2300sc
2nd Pat Fairfield ERA 1090sc
3rd Peter Whitehead Alta 1074sc

1936

1st Andrew Hutchinson MG PB 939sc
2nd Arthur Dobson ERA 1498sc
3rd Percy MacClure Riley 9 1087

1938

1st J McClure MG TA 1292
2nd R Campbell Morgan 1122
3rd W McQuillan McQuillan Special 3622

== Fatality ==
In the 1936 race, The Duke of Grafton was killed when his Bugatti crashed in William Street.

== Commemoration ==
On Sunday, 4 September 2011, the Limerick Classic and Vintage Car Club (LCVCC) hosted an event to mark the 75th anniversary of the 1936 Limerick Grand Prix. The race attracted many of the finest cars and drivers, who lapped the city streets in front of 50,000 spectators. The highlight was the gathering of pre-1940 sports and racing cars, the type that took part in the original race, including Bugattis, Bentleys, Lagondas, Mercedes, etc.

== Newsreel Clips ==
Pathé News produced newsreel clips of the 1935 and 1936 races.

https://www.youtube.com/watch?v=ZiA-f6LiEWU

https://www.youtube.com/watch?v=lmZvlsXBwIk&t=78s
