= Arthur Forwood =

English businessman and politician

The Right Honourable Sir Arthur Forwood Bt

Parliamentary and Financial Secretary to the Admiralty
- In office 1886–1892
- Prime Minister: Robert Gascoyne-Cecil
- Preceded by: J. T. Hibbert
- Succeeded by: Ughtred Kay-Shuttleworth

Member of Parliament for Ormskirk
- In office 18 December 1885 – 27 September 1898
- Preceded by: Constituency created
- Succeeded by: Arthur Stanley

Mayor of the Borough of Liverpool
- In office 1877–1878
- Preceded by: Andrew Barclay Walker
- Succeeded by: Thomas Royden

Personal details
- Born: 23 June 1836 Edge Hill, Liverpool, England
- Died: 27 September 1898 (aged 62) Gateacre, Liverpool
- Spouse(s): Lucy Crosfield (m. 1858; died 1873) Mary Anne Eliza Baines (m. 1874; died 1898)
- Children: 8
- Relatives: William Bower Forwood, brother
- Education: Liverpool Collegiate
- Occupation: Businessman, politician

Sir Arthur Bower Forwood, 1st Baronet, PC (23 June 1836 – 27 September 1898) was an English merchant, shipowner, and politician. He was a Conservative Member of Parliament from 1885 until his death, and in 1895 he was created a baronet.

== Early life and business ==
Forwood was born in Edge Hill, Liverpool, the eldest son of Thomas Brittain Forwood, a merchant, and Charlotte née Bower, the daughter of a cotton broker. He was educated at Liverpool College and then joined the family business. When his father retired from the business in 1862, he ran it with his younger brother, William. This was at a time when the cotton trade was being disrupted by the American Civil War. The brothers made a fortune "first from wartime speculation and blockade running, and then from exploiting telegraph and cotton futures". They set up offices in New York City, New Orleans and Bombay and ran a small fleet of ships that traded in the West Indies, Costa Rica and New York.

== Political life ==
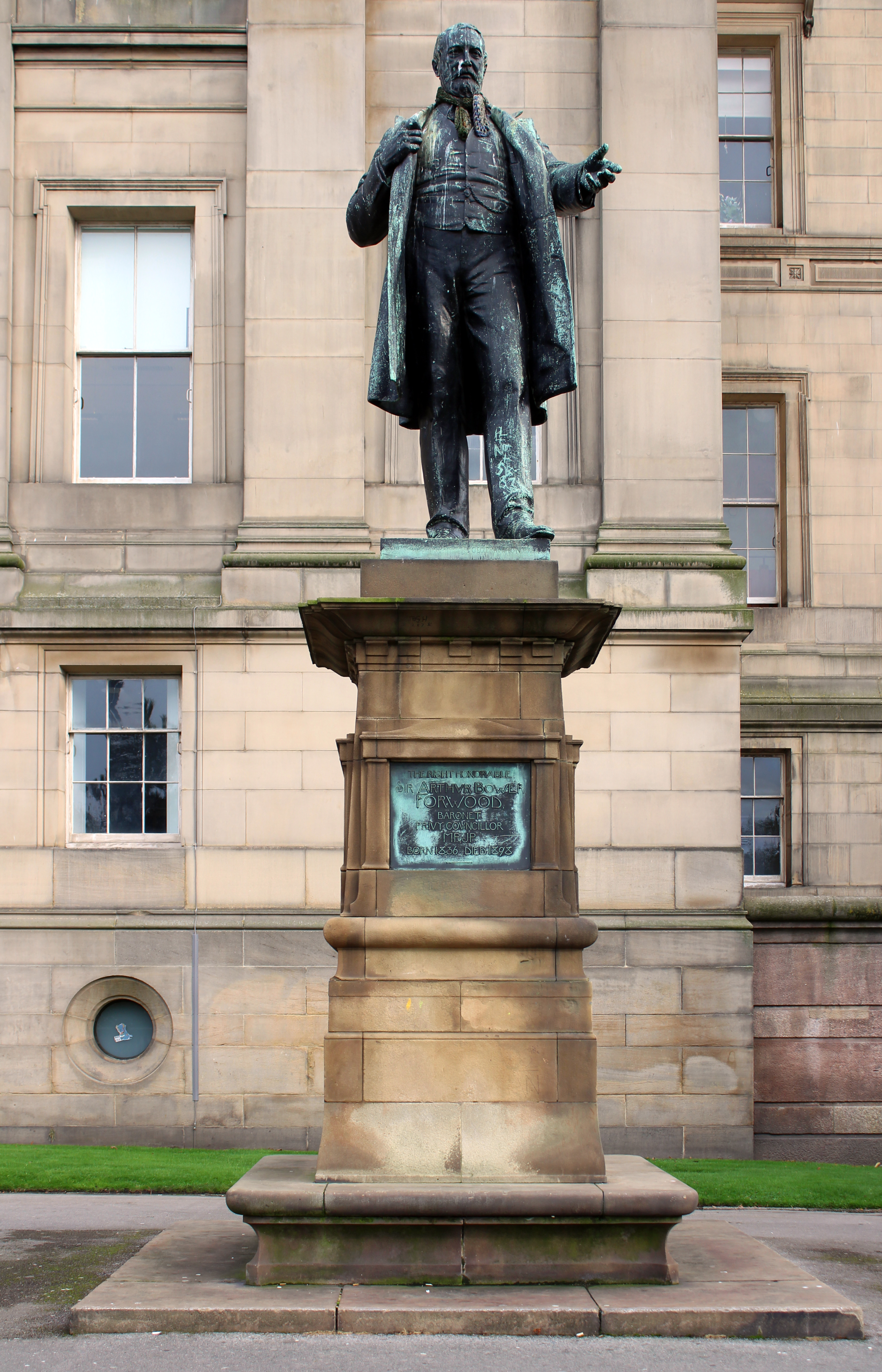
Monument in St John's Gardens, Liverpool.

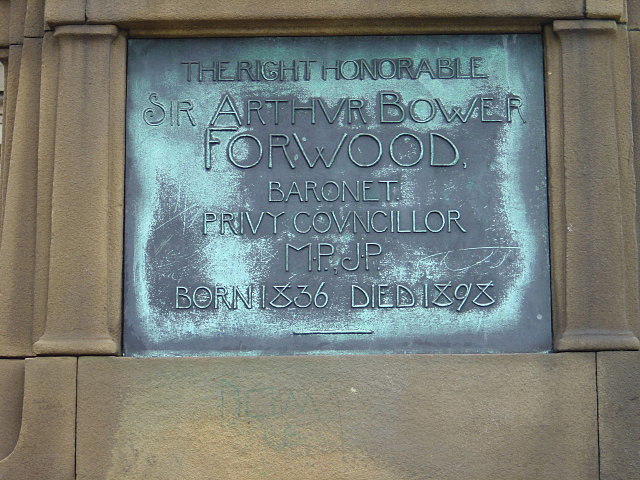
Plaque on Forwood's statue

=== Career ===
Forwood's political life started in 1871 when he was elected as a city councillor. He served as Lord Mayor of Liverpool in 1878–79, and became effectively the leader of Liverpool's Conservatives. He stood for the Liverpool constituency in an 1882 by-election, but lost the Conservative held seat to the Liberal candidate. In the general election of 1885 Forwood was returned for Ormskirk, a seat he held until his death. In 1886 Lord Salisbury appointed him as Parliamentary and Financial Secretary to the Admiralty, a post he retained until 1892. He was the first shipowner to become an Admiralty minister. In 1892 he was appointed as a privy councillor, and was the first serving town councillor to be appointed to this position. He was created a baronet in 1895.

=== Policies and personality ===
Forwood was "orthodox, a resolute champion of the union and Empire, monarchy and church, Lords and Commons", he was concerned that the Conservative leaders were "too faint-hearted or stuck up", and was worried about the "timidity" of the Liverpool merchants. He supported the establishment of an episcopal see and a University College in Liverpool and, more generally, advocated universal suffrage, the redistribution of parliamentary seats, temperance reform, comprehensive employers' liability, old age pensions, council housing, public utilities and public transport. When he was a minister, he was described as being "a hustler" and as having drive as an administrator and reformer, but he did not have "the knack of making himself popular". His manner was described as being "unvarnished" and he was "short of the instincts of a Gentleman". Nevertheless, he was praised for his effectiveness and for his determination.

== Personal life ==
On 26 October 1858 Forwood married Lucy Crosfield, daughter of Simon Crosfield (brother of the businessman Joseph Crosfield), of Liverpool. Before her death in 1873, they had three daughters:

- Emily Crosfield Forwood (1861–1955), who married Henry Grey Kellock in 1893.
- Ethel Charlotte Forwood (1863–1937), who married Hugh Cunninghame Kelly in 1901.
- Mildred Lucy Forwood (1870–1967), who died unmarried.

After Lucy died in 1873, the following year on 1 September 1874 Forwood married Mary Anne Eliza Baines, daughter of the journalist and historian Thomas Baines, FRS, of Liverpool and of London. Together, they had four sons and a daughter.

- Sir Dudley Baines Forwood, 2nd Baronet (1875–1961), who married Norah Isabella Lockett, daughter of Richard Robertson Lockett and Isabella Paterson, in 1901.
- Ida Baines Forwood (1877–1959), who married solicitor Charles Nicholas Theodore Jeffreys, son of Walter Powell Jeffreys and Agnes Robinson, in 1904.
- Lt.-Col. Talbot Brittain Forwood (1879–1940), who married Geraldine Mumford, daughter of G. W. Mumford, in 1923.
- Arthur Noel Forwood (1881–1959), who married Evelyn Agnes Heathcote Addie, daughter of W. Forrester Addie, in 1903. They divorced in 1923 and he married Hyacinth Pollard, daughter of Henry Pollard, in 1923.
- Eric Baines Forwood (1884–1949), who married Mary Katharine Herbert, daughter of John Herbert, in 1911.

Forwood died in September 1898 at his home, The Priory, Gateacre, Liverpool and was buried nearby in the graveyard of All Saints Church, Childwall. He had been suffering from colitis, and this led to heart failure. Forwood's estate amounted to a little over £87,320 (£9.81 million as of 2025). His statue stands in St John's Gardens, Liverpool.

== Arms ==
Coat of arms of Arthur Forwood

Crest
Between two wings Argent the battlements of a tower thereon in front of a stag's head two hatchets in saltire Proper.
Escutcheon
Per fess Or and Azure in chief a cormorant Sable beaked and legged Gules between two fleurs-de-lis of the second and in base an ancient ship with three masts of the first sail Argent colours flying of the fourth.

== See also ==
- List of statues and sculptures in Liverpool

Parliament of the United Kingdom
New constituency	Member of Parliament for Ormskirk; 1885 – 1898	Succeeded by Arthur Stanley
Political offices
Preceded by John Tomlinson Hibbert	Parliamentary and Financial Secretary to the Admiralty; 1886 – 1892	Succeeded by Sir Ughtred Kay-Shuttleworth
Baronetage of the United Kingdom
New creation	Baronet (of The Priory); 1895 – 1898	Succeeded by Dudley Baines Forwood
