= John Nelson (British Army officer) =

British Army officer

Major-General Sir John Nelson KCVO CB DSO OBE MC
- Born: Eustace John Blois Nelson; 15 June 1912; Shenley, Hertfordshire, England
- Died: 23 December 1993 (aged 81); Oban, Argyll and Bute, Scotland
- Military career
- Allegiance: United Kingdom
- Branch: British Army
- Service years: 1933–1968
- Rank: Major-General
- Service number: 53116
- Unit: Grenadier Guards
- Commands: British Forces in Berlin; London District; 4th Guards Brigade Group; 1st Battalion, Grenadier Guards; 1st Guards Parachute Battalion; 3rd Battalion, Grenadier Guards
- Conflicts: Second World War; Palestine Emergency
- Awards: Knight Commander of the Royal Victorian Order; Companion of the Order of the Bath; Companion of the Distinguished Service Order; Officer of the Order of the British Empire; Military Cross

Major-General Sir Eustace John Blois Nelson, KCVO, CB, DSO, OBE, MC (15 June 1912 – 23 December 1993) was a senior British Army officer who commanded the 3rd Battalion, Grenadier Guards during the Second World War and later served as Commandant of the British Sector in Berlin.

== Military career ==
Nelson was born in Hertfordshire, the son of barrister Roland Nelson and Hyla Letitia Grace, sixth daughter of Sir John Ralph Blois, 8th Baronet. He was educated at West Downs School and Eton College, Nelson entered the Royal Military College, Sandhurst where he was commissioned as a second lieutenant into the Grenadier Guards in 1933.

He served in the Second World War, latterly as Commanding Officer (CO) of the 3rd Battalion, Grenadier Guards during the Italian Campaign.

After the war he became CO of the 1st Guards Parachute Battalion in Palestine, before transferring to the War Office as a General Staff Officer (GSO) in 1948. He was CO of the 1st Battalion, Grenadier Guards in Tripoli from 1950 until 1952, when he became a GSO at London District. In 1954 he joined the British military staff in Washington, D.C. and in 1959 he commanded the 4th Guards Brigade Group in Germany. He was made Major-General commanding the Household Brigade and General Officer Commanding (GOC) London District in 1962 and Commandant of the British Sector in Berlin in 1966. He retired from the British Army in 1968.

Following his death in 1993, a memorial service was held at Wellington Barracks, London.

== Family ==
Nelson married Lady (Margaret) Jane Fitzroy, granddaughter of the 8th Duke of Grafton, who was granted the rank of a duke's daughter in 1931. In 1999, their elder daughter, Jennifer Forwood, received the title of Baroness Arlington, which had been abeyant since the death of Nelson's brother-in-law the 9th Duke of Grafton in 1936. Their second daughter, Juliet Auriol Sally Nelson, married Captain Sir Montague John Cholmeley, 6th Bt.

Military offices
Preceded by Sir George Burns	GOC London District; 1962–1965	Succeeded by Sir Basil Eugster
Preceded by Sir David Yates	Commandant, British Sector in Berlin; 1966–1968	Succeeded by Sir James Bowes-Lyon
