= Gwendoline Brogden =

British stage actress and singer (1891–1973)

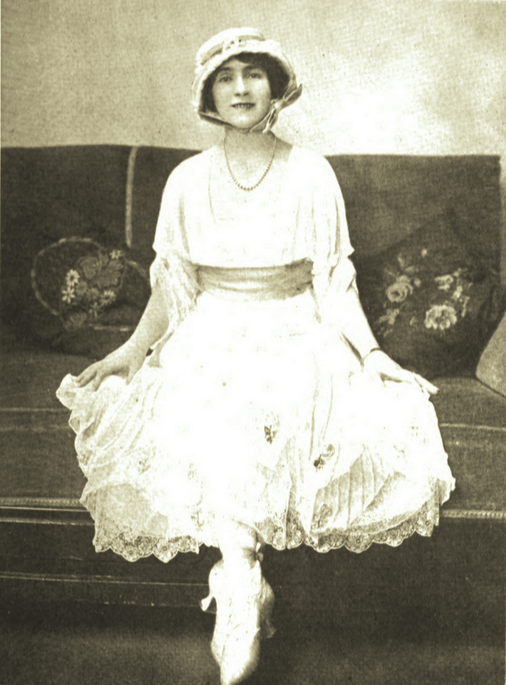
- Born: 28 September 1891; Kingston upon Hull
- Died: 1973
- Occupations: Actor, singer
- Spouse: Basil Foster
- Children: Mary Gwendoline Foster

Gwendoline Brogden (28 September 1891 – 1973) was an English stage actress and singer.

== Career ==
Gwendoline Brogden was born on 28 September 1891 in Hull, the daughter of Thomas Brogden and Gertrude Walsh.

She first appeared on stage as a child, starring as The Water Lily in Bluebell in Fairyland in 1901. After her schooling, she returned to the stage in Miss Hook of Holland in 1907. Her many stage appearances include roles in The Merry Widow, Pinkie and the Fairies, Peter Pan, The Marionettes, The Sunshine Girl, The Girl on the Film, A Pantomime Rehearsal, After the Girl, Vanity Fair, and Bubbly.

She appeared in the revue The Passing Show at the Palace Theatre in 1914 and released a recording of a song from the show, "I'll Make a Man Out of You", which became popular with World War I troops.

== Personal life ==
She was engaged to actor and cricketer Basil Foster when they were both in the cast of The Dollar Princess. They married in 1910 and later divorced. Their daughter Mary Foster married Inigo Freeman-Thomas, 2nd Marquess of Willingdon.
