= John Vincent (historian) =

British historian (1937–2021)

John Russell Vincent (20 December 1937 – 18 March 2021) was a British historian and newspaper columnist.

== Early life and education ==
Born in Stockport, Vincent was educated at Bedales School. He studied history at Christ's College, Cambridge, under J.H. Plumb, and in 1959 began studying for a PhD on mid-Victorian Liberalism under the supervision of George Kitson Clark. His thesis was published in 1966 as The Formation of the British Liberal Party, 1857–1868.

== Academic career ==
Vincent taught at Cambridge from 1967 until 1970, when he joined the University of Bristol as Professor of Modern History. From 1984 he was Professor of History, until his retirement in 2002 when he became Emeritus Professor. He subsequently became Visiting Professor at the University of East Anglia.

== Journalist ==
In the 1980s, Vincent was a columnist for The Times and The Sun newspapers; the latter association ended in 1987. Although he had been left-wing in his youth, Vincent became a conservative and supporter of Thatcherism, and this was reflected in his newspaper columns. His column in The Sun was condemned by some students as sexist and racist, for his opposition to women in part-time jobs and insistence that Asian immigrants "must learn to be British". In February and March 1986, students from the University of Bristol picketed his lectures to demand he cease his column or stop associating it with his post as university professor. As a result he took two-terms' unpaid leave. He continued to contribute articles to many other publications, including book reviews and articles for New Society, the New Statesman, The Listener, The Spectator, the London Review of Books, The Observer, The Sunday Times, and The Guardian.

== Publications ==
In his book on historiography, An Intelligent Person's Guide to History, Vincent observed that if we went solely by the documentary standards most prized by modern historians nothing would be more historically certain than the existence of actual witches in the Middle Ages, given the large volume of solemnly-sworn testimony available in original documents. In 1995, Oxford University Press refused at the last minute to publish the book, having commissioned and overseen much of its writing. A reader's report had described it as being "a sad and bitter diatribe" with a "general absence of the appreciation of the project of social history". Peter Oborne later wrote that it is "one of the most brilliant works of British historiography since the war".

== Death ==
Vincent died on 9 March 2021, aged 83.

== Bibliography ==
- Vincent, John, The Formation of the Liberal Party, 1857–68 (Constable, 1966; second edition, 1980).
- Vincent, John (1967). Pollbooks: How Victorians Voted. Cambridge University Press.
- Vincent, John; Cooke, A. B. (1971). Lord Carlingford's Journal. Oxford University Press.
- Vincent, John; Stenton, M. (1971). McCalmont's Parliamentary Poll Book 1832–1918. Harvester.
- Cooke, Alistair Basil; Vincent, John (1974). Governing Passion: Cabinet Government and Party Politics in Britain, 1885–86. Harvester. ISBN 9780855274924.
- Vincent, John, ed. (1978). Disraeli, Derby and the Conservative Party: The Political Journals of Lord Stanley 1849–69. Harvester.
- Vincent, John (1979). Gladstone and Ireland. Raleigh Lecture. British Academy.
- Vincent, John, ed. (1984). The Crawford Papers: The Journals of David Lindsay, Twenty-Seventh Earl of Crawford and Tenth Earl of Balcarres during the years 1892 to 1940. Manchester University Press.
- Vincent, John (1987). "The Thatcher Governments, 1979–1987". In Hennessy, Peter; Seldon, Anthony (eds.). Ruling Performance: British Government from Attlee to Thatcher. Blackwell.
- Vincent, John (1990). Disraeli. Oxford Paperbacks.
- Vincent, John (2005). An Intelligent Person's Guide to History. Gerald Duckworth & Co Ltd.
- Vincent, John, ed. (1995). The Derby Diaries 1869–1878: A Selection from the Diaries of Edward Henry Stanley, 15th Earl of Derby. Cambridge University Press.
- Vincent, John (1996). 1874–1880' in Anthony Seldon (ed.), How Tory Governments Fall. Fontana Press. pp. 159–187.
- Vincent, John, ed. (2003). The Diaries of Edward Henry Stanley, 15th Earl of Derby, between 1878 and 1893. Leopard's Head Press.
