= The Sunshine Girl =

Edwardian musical comedy by Paul A. Rubens and Cecil Raleigh

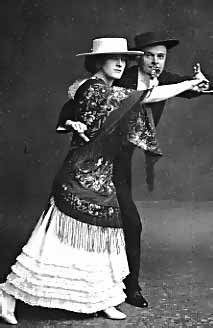
George Grossmith, Jr. and Phyllis Dare

Edmund Payne

The Sunshine Girl is an Edwardian musical comedy in two acts with a book by Paul A. Rubens and Cecil Raleigh, music and lyrics by Rubens and additional lyrics by Arthur Wimperis. The story involves a working girl who falls in love with the heir to the factory. He is in disguise and wants to be loved for himself, not his position, so he gets his friend to pose as the heir, leading to complications for both men.

The musical was first produced by George Edwardes at the Gaiety Theatre in London, opening on February 24, 1912, and running for 336 performances. It starred George Grossmith, Jr. as Lord Bicester, Edmund Payne as Floot and Phyllis Dare as Delia Dale. It also had a Broadway run in 1913 at the Knickerbocker Theatre starring Grossmith's in-law, Vernon Castle.

Port Sunlight is the real life suburb on which the setting of the musical is based. The show introduced the tango to British audiences.

== Synopsis ==
Setting: Port Sunshine, England

The hero, Vernon Blundell, has inherited the great "Sunshine" Soap Factory at Port Sunshine, but in the will his uncle inserted a clause that Vernon must not be engaged or married before the expiration of five years; otherwise the whole property will be vested in the various heads of departments on a co-operative basis. Vernon, however, had for some months been working in the factory as an ordinary "hand", and in that period of time had fallen in love with pretty Delia Dale, an assistant in the perfumery department. He wants her to love him for himself, rather than for his position, and accordingly he arranges for his stockbroker friend, Lord Bicester, commonly known as "Bingo", to personate him and pose as head of the establishment.

After some demur, "Bingo" agrees to the proposition and trusts to chance that his identity will not be discovered. Unfortunately, he quickly finds himself in a tangle of complications. He is recognised by his fiancée, Lady Rosabelle Meridew, and also by Floot, an ex-cabman, who once drove him from a Covent Garden Fancy Dress Ball after a night of more than ordinary exhilaration. Floot arrives at Port Sunshine on his way from Land's End to John o' Groats, his purpose being to win a £50 prize for walking offered by an enterprising newspaper to whomsoever shall accomplish the journey without begging, borrowing or stealing. Floot immediately sees that he has a good thing on, and Bingo has to purchase his silence by making him the general manager of the soap works.

Floot is married to Brenda Blacker, who was Bingo's travelling companion on his journey home from the ball. She is now engaged as a cook in the household of the Lady Rosabelle and is also carrying on a flirtation with a longshoreman, known as Commodore Parker. At the end, it is declared that no law can stop a man from marrying the woman he loves, and so the terms of the will are over-ridden, and Vernon and Delia prepare to "live happily ever after".

== Roles and original cast ==
Basil Foster and Phyllis Dare

- Lord Bicester (known as "Bingo," a young Stockbroker) – George Grossmith, Jr.
- Vernon Blundell – Basil Foster
- Commodore Parker (known as "Nosey," of the Blundell Line of Boats) – George Barrett
- Hodson (Chief Manager of the Works) – Tom Walls
- Stepneyak (Manager of the Foreign Department) – Robert Nainby
- Dever, Whitley, Telfridge, Garing, Wears and Nelgrove (Managers of the various Departments of the Works)
- Clarence (a Footman) – F. Raynham
- Floot (An ex-four-wheeler driver) – Edmund Payne
- Lady Rosabelle Merrydew (Lord Bicester's Fiancée) – Olive May
- Marie Silvaine (Head of the Packing Department at the Works) – Mabel Sealby
- Emmeline (A Workgirl) – Violet Essex
- Sybil, May, Lucy, Violet, Lily and Kit (Heads of the various Departments)
- Miss Molyneux – Gladys Wray
- Hon. Miss Grey – Pattie Wells
- Brenda Blacker (Floot's wife, calling herself by her maiden name) – Connie Ediss
- Delia Dale (of the Perfume Department of the Works) – Phyllis Dare

== Musical numbers ==
Act I – Port Sunshine.

- No. 1. Chorus – "When you want a cake of soap to finish off your toilet, we're the folks who boil it"
- No. 2. Marie & Chorus – "There's a little fable: When the cat's away, on the kitchen table, mice begin to play"
- No. 3. Delia & Vernon – "There is a fever that few understand – you must take care when it is there!"

Brenda Blacker and Commodore Parker

- No. 4. Lord Bicester – "Two young chaps may be sent, perhaps, to the same old Public School"
- No. 5. Mrs. Blacker & Parker – "It was leg-o'-mutton day when I first met you"
- No. 6. Chorus – "Here comes our new proprietor!"
- No. 7. Lord Bicester & Delia – "Ladies, you were born to rule us ever since the world began"
- No. 8. Marie & Floot – "Man's no longer Lord of all Creation, as he used to be"
- No. 9. Octet – "Men of Business" – "Each one of us has a special occupation"
- No. 10. Mrs. Blacker & Chorus – "Lots of people nowadays, they go abroad for a holiday"
- No. 11. Delia & Chorus – "You should always try to look your very best; men will be impressed"
- No. 12. Finale – "Now, Mister Blundell, we wait for you instructions"

Act II – Mr. Blundell's Private House at Port Sunshine.

- No. 13. Chorus – "Every kind of party we have read about"
- No. 14. Emmeline & Chorus – "Here's to love and laughter, never mind what comes after"
- No. 15. Marie, Mrs. Blacker, Floot & Lord Bicester – "When there's a party held upstairs"
- No. 16. Delia & Chorus of County Ladies – "There lived a little lady once, as dull as she could be"
- No. 17. Floot – "The art of being lazy is a science in its way"
- No. 18. Lord Bicester & Girls – "When a man sees a maid, and a maid sees a man"
- No. 19. Lord Bicester & Floot – "We get some funny cases to attend to nowadays"
- No. 20. Lady Rosabelle & Chorus of Workgirls – "There lived a little lady just a hundred years ago"
- No. 21. Delia & Lord Bicester – "Wouldn't it be jolly if we took a little holiday?"
- No. 22. Mrs. Blacker & Chorus – "I've had a trip on board of a ship" (known as "I've been to the Durbar")
- No. 23. Finale – "Little girl, little girl, little girl, little girl, you are a dear!"

== Critical reception ==
The Times praised the piece. "We have never known a gayer evening in the gay and absurd world behind the footlights of the Gaiety. … As to the acting and the singing, every one was at their best." The English Review thought the performances finer than the play: "Strip The Sunshine Girl of the ladies, and not even the turns of the Payne-Grossmith-Barrett trio could hold it together … yet all Mr. Grossmith has to do is to appear now and then in fashionable suitings, just to see, as it were, how things are going." The Manchester Guardian commented, "The whole is as good as any other Gaiety piece. The plot goes entirely to waste in the second act. … The great successes of the evening were Miss Ediss's uproariously funny songs about Brighton and the Durbar and a duet sung by Mr. Payne and Mr. Grossmith (as Lord Bicester) representing the adventures of two London policemen." The Illustrated London News gave a uniformly excellent notice: "The Sunshine Girl is an appropriate title: all is brightness and light and geniality in the new Gaiety entertainment. ... The music of Mr. Rubens is deliciously light and tuneful, and there is more than the customary amount of clever dancing.
