= Thomas Baines (journalist) =

English journalist and historian (1806–1881)

- Born: 1806; Leeds
- Died: 1881 (aged 74–75)
- Parent: Edward Baines (1774–1848)

Thomas Baines (1806–1881) was an English journalist and historian.

== Biography ==
Baines was born at Leeds in 1806, the third son of Edward Baines, M.P.

In 1829 he settled in Liverpool acting editor of the Liverpool Times newspaper; having acquired the paper as the Billinge's Advertiser; the paper closed in 1858 due to competition from cheap dailys. After 1858 he became secretary of the Liverpool's office in London, as an employee of the city's corporation.

For thirty years was an active promoter of liberal interests in Lancashire. In 1852 he published a valuable history of the commerce and town of Liverpool, and in 1867 Lancashire and Cheshire Past and Present, having in 1859 settled in London at the Liverpool Office as a parliamentary agent. His last work, Yorkshire Past and Present, was published in 1871; Two minor books of his were Agricultural Resources of Great Britain and the Colonies, and Observations on the River Plate. His county histories are characterised by fullness of details, clearness of statement, and orderly arrangement.

On 31 October 1881, he died at Seaforth Hall, near Liverpool, the residence of his son-in-law Edmund Knowles Muspratt.

== Family ==
In 1836 Baines married Fanny Higgins (1815–1856), daughter of Vincent Higgins (1789–1854) an iron merchant and his first wife Mary Anne née Wall (c1792–1836). Thomas and Fanny had seven children, of which six survived him. Two of his daughters married prominent Liverpool figures:

- Frances Jane Baines (1840–1910) married Edmund Knowles Muspratt and
- Mary Anne Eliza Baines (1842–1928) was the second wife of Arthur Bower Forwood.

== Works ==
- Baines, Thomas (1845), Observations on the present state of affairs of the River Plate, Liverpool Times
- Baines, Thomas (1845), The Agricultural Resources of Great Britain, Ireland, and the Colonies Considered: In Connection with the Rise in the Price of Corn, and the Alarming Condition of the Irish People
- Baines, Thomas (1852), History of the commerce and town of Liverpool: and of the rise of the manufacturing industry in the adjoining counties, Longman, Brown, Green, and Longmans, in several parts
- Baines, Thomas (1859), Liverpool in 1859: The Port & Town of Liverpool, and the Harbour, Docks, and Commerce of the Mersey in 1859, Longman and Co.
- Baines, Thomas; Fairburn, William (1868), Lancashire and Cheshire, past and present: a history and a description of the palatine counties of Lancaster and Chester forming the North-western division of England, from the earliest ages to the present time, William MacKenzie
  - Lancashire and Cheshire, vol. 1, 1868
- Baines, Thomas; Baines, Edward (1871), Yorkshire, past and present: a history and a description of the three ridings of the great county of York, from the earliest ages to the year 1870; with an account of its manufactures, commerce, and civil and mechanical engineering, William Mackenzie
  - Yorkshire, past and present..., vol. 1, 1871
  - Yorkshire, past and present..., vol. 2
