= William Bower Forwood =

English merchant, shipowner and politician

Sir William Bower Forwood KBE DL
- Born: 21 January 1840; Edge Hill, Liverpool, England
- Died: 23 March 1928 (aged 88); Funchal, Madeira
- Resting place: Windermere Cemetery, Rayrigg Road, Windermere, Cumbria
- Education: Liverpool Collegiate Institution, Pestalozzian school, Worksop, Derbyshire
- Occupation: Businessman
- Spouses: Mary Miles Moss; Elizabeth le Fleming
- Children: Three sons, seven daughters
- Parent(s): Thomas Brittain Forwood; Charlotte Bower
- Relatives: Sir Arthur Forwood, brother

Sir William Bower Forwood KBE DL (21 January 1840 – 23 March 1928) was an English merchant, shipowner and politician. He was a wealthy businessman and a local politician in Liverpool who raised money for the building of the Liverpool Overhead Railway and Liverpool Cathedral.

== Early life and business ==
Forwood was born in Edge Hill, Liverpool, the second son of Thomas Brittain Forwood, a Liverpool merchant, and Charlotte née Bower. He was educated at Liverpool Collegiate and at a Pestalozzian school in Worksop. He joined the family business in 1859 and, when his father retired from it on 22 November 1862, ran it with his elder brother, Arthur. This was when the cotton trade was being disrupted by the American Civil War. The brothers made a fortune "first from wartime speculation and blockade running, and then from exploiting telegraph and cotton futures".

The brothers set up offices in New York City, New Orleans and Bombay and ran a small fleet of ships that traded in the West Indies, Costa Rica and New York. William entered politics in 1868 when he was elected to Liverpool Town Council, serving on it for over 40 years, and was a JP for Lancashire from 1882. He was president of the American chamber of commerce in 1872 and of its Liverpool equivalent in 1871 and 1878–81, became president of the Liverpool Cotton Association.

== Civic and charitable work ==
William Forwood was chairman of Liverpool's Libraries Museum and Art committee from 1890 to 1909, and persuaded Andrew Carnegie to give £50,000 towards building new libraries. He was knighted on 19 July 1883 for his work as the city's Lord Mayor in opposing the Fenians. In 1888 he played an important part in raising money for the building of the Liverpool Overhead Railway, and in 1893 became its first chairman. He was a director of the Cunard Line from 1888 to 1923 and its deputy chairman from 1906 to 1909. From 1887 to 1928 he was a director of the Bank of Liverpool and its chairman from 1898 to 1901. As part of his charitable work, he was President of the Seaman's Orphanage. Forwood was treasurer of the executive committee responsible for raising money towards the building of Liverpool Cathedral at the beginning of the 20th century. He took six weeks away from his other affairs and raised a total of £168,000 (£23 million as of 2023). Forwood was appointed a deputy lieutenant of Lancashire in April 1902, and was High Sheriff of Lancashire for 1909.

He received the Freedom of the City of Liverpool on 4 June 1902 ″in recognition of the eminent services he has rendered to the municipality throughout his membership of the council, extending over a period of 33 years, ... and especially for the deep interest he has taken in the establishment of libraries and reeding-rooms in the city". When the sitting mayor William Rutherford stepped down to contest a by-election for the UK Parliament in early 1903, Forwood was asked to serve as mayor of Liverpool for the election campaign. He served a brief period between 10 January and 4 February 1903, when he stepped down and the recently elected MP Rutherford was unanimously re-elected as mayor.

== Personal life ==
Forwood's first marriage was in 1862 to Mary Eleanor née Moss (1841-1896), daughter of William Miles Moss (1809-1871), a Liverpool merchant and shipowner, and Esther (née Johnson; 1809-1876). Forwood and Mary had three sons and seven daughters. Mary died in 1896. In 1898, he married Elizabeth Constant (née Hughes, later Hughes Le Fleming) (1860-1933), the daughter of Major-General George Cumberland Hughes le Fleming and his second wife Anne Jane (née Rennick) of Rydal Hall, Cumbria.

Forwood was a committed Anglican Christian who, as well as raising funds for the construction of Liverpool Cathedral, also developed a lasting relationship with St Martin's Church, Bowness-on-Windermere, where he funded the construction of a War Memorial Chapel in the early 1920s.

He developed an interest in yachting, was commodore of the Mersey and the Windermere yacht clubs, and was co-founder of the Yacht Racing Association. Forwood died at the Belmond Reid's Palace hotel in Funchal, Madeira. He was buried in Windermere Cemetery, Rayrigg Road in Windermere. His estate amounted to a little more than £356,000 (£27.1 million as of 2023).
