= Cholmeley baronets of Easton (1806) =

Escutcheon of the Cholmeley Baronets of Easton

The Cholmeley baronetcy, of Easton in the County of Lincoln, was created in the Baronetage of the United Kingdom on 4 March 1806 for Montague Cholmeley, subsequently Member of Parliament for Grantham. His son, the second Baronet, sat as Member of Parliament for North Lincolnshire. He was succeeded by his son, the third Baronet, who also represented Grantham as MP. His grandson, the fifth Baronet, was High Sheriff of Lincolnshire in 1961 and a Vice-Lord-Lieutenant and Deputy Lieutenant of the county.

As of 2023, the title is held by his grandson, the seventh Baronet, who succeeded his father in 1998. The family seat was Easton Hall, Grantham, Lincolnshire, which was demolished in 1951.

== Cholmeley baronets, of Easton (1806) ==
- Sir Montague Cholmeley, 1st Baronet (1772–1831)
- Sir Montague John Cholmeley, 2nd Baronet (1802–1874)
- Sir Hugh Arthur Henry Cholmeley, 3rd Baronet (1839–1904)
- Sir Montagu Aubrey Rowley Cholmeley, 4th Baronet (1876–1914)
- Sir Hugh John Francis Sibthorp Cholmeley, 5th Baronet (1906–1964)
- Sir Montague John Cholmeley, 6th Baronet (1935–1998)
- Sir (Hugh John) Frederick Sebastian Cholmeley, 7th Baronet (born 1968)

The heir apparent is the present holder's son Montague Hugh Peter Cholmeley (born 1997).

== Notes ==
Baronetage of the United Kingdom
Preceded by Shelley baronets	Cholmley baronets of Easton; 4 March 1806	Succeeded by Sutton baronets
