= Inigo Freeman-Thomas, 2nd Marquess of Willingdon =

British Liberal politician (1889–1979)

The Most Honourable The Marquess of Willingdon
- Willingdon in 1943
- Born: 25 July 1898
- Died: 19 March 1979 (aged 80)
- Military career
- Allegiance: United Kingdom
- Branch: British Indian Army; Royal Air Force
- Service years: 1915–1918, 1940–1954
- Rank: Squadron Leader
- Conflicts: World War I World War II

Inigo Brassey Freeman-Thomas, 2nd Marquess of Willingdon (25 July 1898 – 19 March 1979), was a British Liberal Party politician and the second son of Freeman Freeman-Thomas, 1st Marquess of Willingdon, a former Viceroy of India. From 1931 to 1941 he was styled Viscount Ratendone.

== Biography ==
Willingdon was the second son of Freeman Freeman-Thomas, 1st Marquess of Willingdon, and his wife Lady Marie Brassey, daughter of Thomas Brassey, 1st Earl Brassey. When his elder brother, Second Lieutenant Hon. Gerard Freeman-Thomas, was killed in action on 12 September 1914, he became heir apparent to his father. From 1919 to 1920, he served as an aide-de-camp on the personal staff of the Viceroy of India, Frederic Thesiger, 1st Viscount Chelmsford.

His father was raised in the peerage from Viscount Willingdon to Earl of Willingdon in 1931, a few months before the end of his tenure as Governor General of Canada. With the earldom came the subsidiary title of Viscount Ratendone, which the younger Freeman-Thomas used as a courtesy title. His father was created Marquess of Willingdon in 1936, and when he died in 1941, the younger Freeman-Thomas became the second marquess.

In the House of Lords, he served as a Liberal Party whip from 1948 and then Liberal Chief Whip from 1949 to 1950.

== Marriages ==
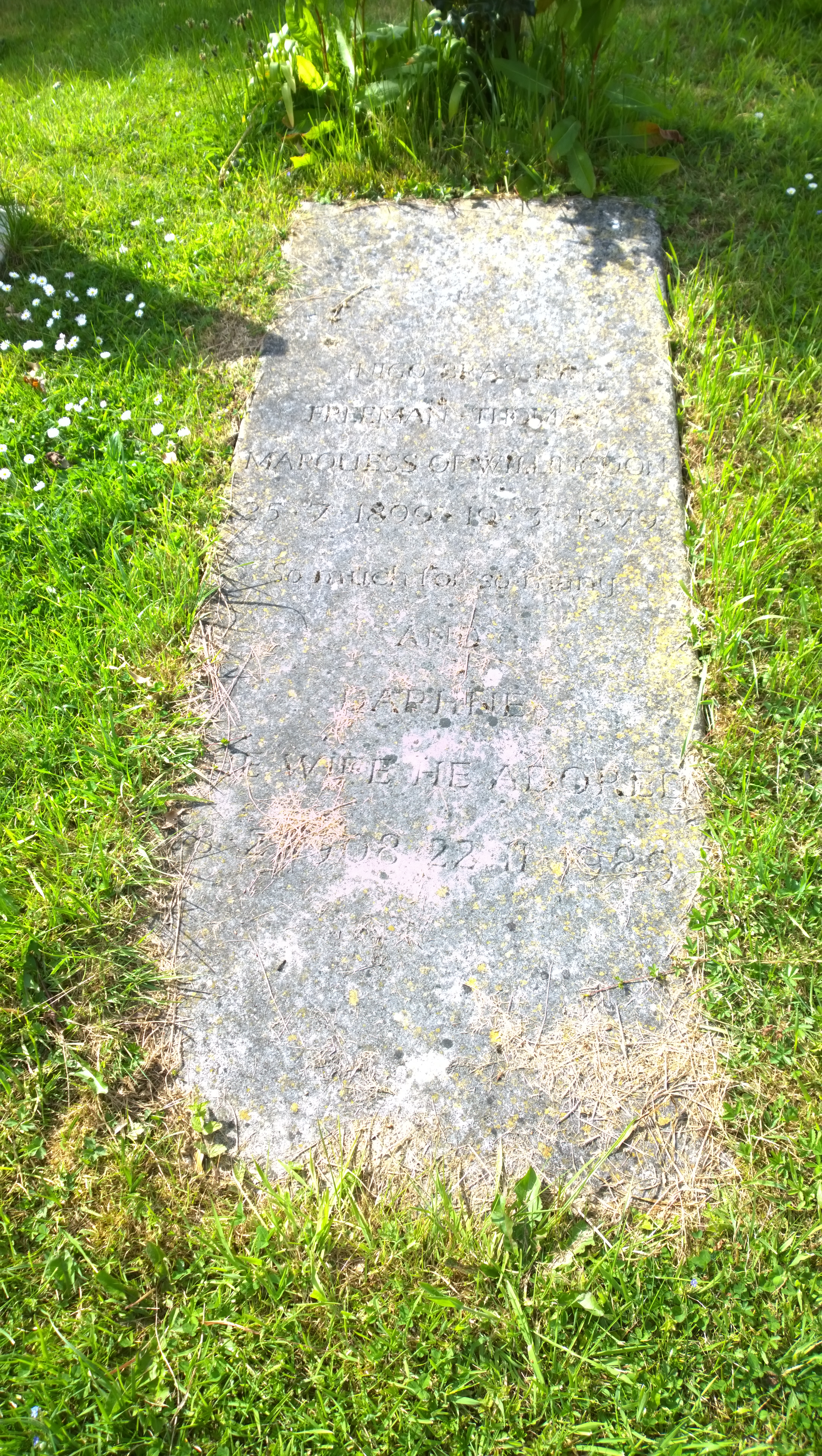
Grave of Inigo Freeman-Thomas

He was married three times:

- 8 October 1924 to Maxine Forbes-Robertson, daughter of Sir Johnston Forbes-Robertson, divorced 1932.
- 6 June 1934 to Mary Foster, daughter of Basil Foster and Gwendoline Brogden, divorced 1939.
- 9 June 1943 to Daphne Caldwell, daughter of Seymour Caldwell.

He had no children and the marquessate became extinct on his death. He was buried at St Peters, Cranbourne, England.

== Styles ==
- 1898–1910: Mr Inigo Freeman-Thomas
- 1910–1931: The Honourable Inigo Freeman-Thomas
- 1931–1941: Viscount Ratendone
- 1941–1979: The Most Honourable The Marquess of Willingdon

== Arms ==
Coat of arms of Inigo Freeman-Thomas, 2nd Marquess of Willingdon
Crest 1st, a demi-lion rampant gules charged on the shoulder with an ermine spot argent (Thomas); 2nd, issuant out of an antique crown azure, a boar's head proper (Freeman). Escutcheon Quarterly: 1st and 4th argent, three lions rampant gules, a chief azure (Thomas); 2nd and 3rd ermine, two pallets azure, over all three fusils conjoined in fesse or (Freeman). Supporters On either side a freeman armed cap-à-pie in English armour of the 17th century proper. Motto Honesty is the best policy.

== Sources ==
- Patrick Cracroft-Brennan, Willingdon, Marquess of (UK, 1936 - 1979) in Cracroft's Peerage. Accessed 22 December 2013.

Peerage of the United Kingdom
Preceded by Freeman Freeman-Thomas	Marquess of Willingdon; 1941–1979	Extinct
