= Jennifer Forwood, 11th Baroness Arlington =

British baroness (born 1939)

Jennifer Jane Forwood, 11th Baroness Arlington (born 7 May 1939 in London, née Nelson), is the daughter of General Sir John Nelson (died 1993) and Lady Margaret Jane Fitzroy (died 1995), sister of the 9th Duke of Grafton.

== Life ==
Educated at Downham School, Hatfield Heath, Essex (now Down Hall), on 8 December 1965, she married Capt. Rodney Simon Dudley Forwood (died 1999), the adopted stepson of Sir Dudley Forwood, 3rd Baronet. They have two sons:

- Hon. Patrick John Dudley Forwood (b. 23 April 1967), heir apparent to the title;
- Hon. James Roland Nelson Forwood (b. 16 March 1969)

== Peerage title claim ==
In May 1999, she succeeded as Baroness Arlington when the abeyance of the Arlington barony was terminated. Under the provisions of the Peerage Act 1963, she took her seat in the House of Lords on 27 May 1999, and remained in the House until 11 November 1999 when the House of Lords Act 1999 took effect. She made her only speech the week after the death of her husband, who had helped her to prepare it, on 18 October 1999 in a series of questions to the Transport Minister in the Lords, on the subject of speeding.

Lady Arlington, after having succeeded in claiming her ancestral title out of abeyance in her favour, was reminded with tongue-in-cheek by the Labour hereditary peer, Lord Berkeley (also cr. Lord Gueterbock in 2000), that she was now well prepared to petition for the restoration of the ancient titles of Earl of Arlington and/or Viscount Thetford in her favour, being one of the four co-heirs to those titles. Her barony was the last peerage to be brought out of abeyance while hereditary peers had an automatic right to attend the House of Lords.

== See also ==
- Baron Arlington
- Forwood baronets
- House of Lords

Peerage of England
In abeyance from 1936 Title last held by John FitzRoy	Baroness Arlington; 1999–present	Incumbent
