= Alfred FitzRoy, 8th Duke of Grafton =

British noble (1850–1930)

His Grace The Duke of Grafton DL
- Born: Alfred William Maitland FitzRoy; 3 March 1850; London, England
- Died: 10 January 1930 (aged 79); Euston, Suffolk, England
- Spouses: Margaret Smith (m. 1875; died 1913) Susanna McTaggart-Stewart (m. 1916)
- Children: Lady Lillian Robertson; Lady Mary FitzRoy; William FitzRoy, Viscount Ipswich; Lady Elfrida FitzRoy; Cecilia Howard, Baroness Howard
- Parent(s): Augustus FitzRoy, 7th Duke of Grafton; Anna Balfour

Alfred William Maitland FitzRoy, 8th Duke of Grafton DL (3 March 1850 – 10 January 1930), styled Lord Alfred FitzRoy between 1882 and 1912 and Earl of Euston between 1912 and 1918, was a British peer and soldier.

== Early life ==
He was the second son of Augustus FitzRoy, 7th Duke of Grafton, and his wife Anna Balfour, daughter of James Francis Balfour (1785–1845) and aunt of Arthur Balfour. His elder brother and heir to the dukedom Henry James FitzRoy, Earl of Euston died in 1912, before their father's death.

== Career ==
Upon the death of his father, he succeeded as the 8th Duke of Grafton in 1918.

On 15 March 1920, he was appointed a Deputy Lieutenant of Suffolk.

== Personal life ==
=== Marriages and children ===
On 27 April 1875 he married Margaret Rose Smith (1855–1913). Before her death in 1913, they were the parents of three children:

- Lady Lillian Rose FitzRoy (1876–1960), who married Charles Robertson.
- Lady Mary Margaret FitzRoy (1877–1966), who died unmarried.
- William Henry Alfred FitzRoy, Viscount Ipswich (1884–1918), who married Auriol Brougham; he fought in World War I and was killed in an airplane accident on 23 April 1918.

The Duke remarried on 8 January 1916 to Lady Borthwick (née Susanna Mary MacTaggart-Stewart) (1878–1961), widow of Archibald Patrick Thomas Borthwick, 20th Lord Borthwick and daughter of Sir Mark McTaggart-Stewart, 1st Baronet. Together, they had two daughters:

- Lady Elfrida Marie Susanna FitzRoy (1919–1920), who died in infancy.
- Lady Cecilia Blanche Genevieve FitzRoy (1922–1974), who married the life peer Lord Howard of Henderskelfe and had issue.

=== Residences ===
Alfred's father had leased a London house at No. 6 Chesterfield Gardens since 1902, and following his accession to the Dukedom in 1918 Alfred continued to maintain a London residence at 6 Chesterfield Gardens until his death in January 1930.

His widowed second wife Susanna, Duchess of Grafton (step-grandmother of the 9th Duke) and their daughter Lady Cecilia FitzRoy occupied No. 18 Prince’s Gate, which continued to be the Dowager Duchess’ London home until her death in 1961. 18 Prince’s Gate continued to be the home of Lady Cecilia, who sold the house in 1965.

=== Death and estate ===
The Duke died in 1930 and was succeeded by his grandson, John, Viscount Ipswich.

In April 1930 it was reported that the Duke had left an unsettled personal estate valued at £97,333 gross, with net value of £92,942. In his will he bequeathed £1,000 to his groom and chauffeur T. Jeffcoate, £500 to his estate agent William D. Paterson, and a life annuity of £200 to his former agent W. R. Johnstone; his keeper George Smith received his Johnson guns and case, while indoor servants with at least four years' service received one year's wages. He also left a Rufus violin by Hill to Mabel Landon, £100 and his Purdey guns and case to Captain Eric Walter Harbord, and £100 to Sir Herbert Walter Samuelson; the residue of his estate was bequeathed to his widowed second wife.

=== Descendants ===
Through his eldest son William, he was a grandfather of John FitzRoy, 9th Duke of Grafton, Lady Margaret Jane FitzRoy (who married Maj. Gen. Sir John Nelson), and Lady Mary-Rose FitzRoy; and a great-grandfather of Jennifer Forwood, 11th Baroness Arlington.

Peerage of England
| Preceded by Augustus FitzRoy | Duke of Grafton; 1918–1930 | Succeeded by John FitzRoy |
