= John FitzRoy, 9th Duke of Grafton =

British duke (1914–1936)

His Grace The Duke of Grafton

9th Duke of Grafton
- In office 1930–1936
- Preceded by: Alfred FitzRoy, 8th Duke of Grafton
- Succeeded by: Charles FitzRoy, 10th Duke of Grafton

Personal details
- Born: John Charles William FitzRoy; 1 August 1914 London, England
- Died: 4 August 1936 (aged 22) Limerick, County Limerick, Irish Free State
- Parents: William FitzRoy, Viscount Ipswich (father); Auriol Brougham (mother)

John Charles William FitzRoy, 9th Duke of Grafton (1 August 1914 – 4 August 1936), was a British peer, politician, and race car driver, styled The Honourable John FitzRoy from 1914 to 1918 and Viscount Ipswich from 1918–1930. He inherited the dukedom at age 15, but died of severe burns following a crash in a motor race, aged 22.

== Early life and education ==
FitzRoy was born in London — three days before the UK entered the First World War — the first child and only son of William FitzRoy, Viscount Ipswich and his wife, Auriol Margaretta Brougham. His father, an agriculturalist, was styled Viscount Ipswich as the eldest son and heir of Alfred FitzRoy, Earl of Euston, himself son and heir of Augustus FitzRoy, 7th Duke of Grafton.

He was baptised at eight weeks in Potterspury, Northamptonshire. His godparents were his great-grandfather the 7th Duke of Grafton, a retired general who was severely wounded in the Crimean War; his grandfather Major James Brougham; his first cousin Lt. Edward FitzRoy (1893–1917), who was killed aboard HMS Simoom (1916); and his aunt Lady Mary FitzRoy.

Shortly after John's birth, his father, Viscount Ipswich, enlisted in the military as a gentleman ranker in the 5th Buffs. Before the end of the year he obtained a commission in the Coldstream Guards. In the summer of 1915, he returned home to Whittlebury Lodge after being wounded in France, suffering a burst eardrum from the bursting of a shell next to him. After recovering, he joined the Royal Air Force and was killed in April 1918 in an accident in Wiltshire.

On 4 December 1918, his great-grandfather the 7th Duke died, and John became heir to his grandfather, the 8th Duke.

He was educated at Harrow and Trinity College, Cambridge. He had two younger sisters, Lady (Margaret) Jane FitzRoy (1916–1995), who married Maj.–Gen. Sir John Nelson; and Lady Mary Rose FitzRoy (1918–2010), who married Francis Trelawny Williams. (His sisters were granted the rank of a duke's daughter in 1931.)

In 1929, when styled as Viscount Ipswich, gave away his mother on the occasion of her second marriage, to Major Gavin Hume-Gore.

He succeeded his grandfather in 1930 at age 15, becoming the youngest duke in England at the time as well as youngest Duke of Grafton. In 1935, on the occasion of his 21st birthday, a large coming-of-age party was held at Euston Hall. The duke shook hands with all 1,400 guests, crippling his right hand for the rest of the night.

== Adventures ==
The Duke enjoyed thrill-seeking activities. In August 1930, he was slightly injured while he trying out a new motorcycle at Euston Hall. He was thrown to the ground when the motorcycle skidded, and he received several abrasions on his face and hands.

In December 1935, he passed his test as a glider pilot and was a member of the Cambridge Gliding Club.

In early 1936, he made his motor-racing debut at Brooklands.

=== Death ===
On 3 August 1936, two days after his 22nd birthday, the Duke suffered fatal burns after his Bugatti T59 crashed during the Limerick Grand Prix motor race in Limerick, Ireland.

He was reported to have "struck the ridge of a cement-surfaced road early in the first lap, and this caused him to lose control of his machine. It leapt into the air, struck a stone wall, and at once burst into flames and was completely destroyed. Stewards at once made gallant efforts to extricate the Duke from the blazing car, but did not succeed before he was seriously burned."

He was taken unconscious to Limerick Hospital, where he died early the following morning.

==== Estate ====
In October 1936 probate of the Duke's will was granted to his cousin and successor Charles FitzRoy, 10th Duke of Grafton. His gross personal estate was valued at £120,695, with a net value of £117,607; in his will he bequeathed £1,000 outright and £10,000 in trust each to his sisters Lady Jane and Lady Mary Rose FitzRoy, and £1,000 outright and an annuity of £1,500 to his mother Auriol, Viscountess Ipswich; his residuary estate was bequeathed to the 10th Duke.

== Titles ==
The dukedom was inherited by his first cousin Rev. Charles FitzRoy. The viscountcy of Thetford and earldom and barony of Arlington, created in 1672 with a special remainder allowing it to pass to both male and female heirs, fell into abeyance between his sisters, Lady Jane and Lady Mary Rose. The viscountcy and earldom remain abeyant, but the abeyance of his barony was terminated in 1999, in favour of Lady Jane's eldest daughter, Jennifer.

== Arms ==
Coat of arms of John FitzRoy, 9th Duke of Grafton
Coronet The coronet of a Duke Crest On a Chapeau Gules turned up Ermine a Lion statant guardant Or ducally crowned Azure and gorged with a Collar counter-compony Argent and of the fourth. Escutcheon The Royal Arms of Charles II, viz Quarterly: 1st and 4th, France and England quarterly; 2nd, Scotland; 3rd, Ireland; the whole debruised by a Baton sinister compony of six pieces Argent and Azure Supporters Dexter: a Lion guardant Or ducally crowned Azure; Sinister: a Greyhound Argent, each gorged with a Collar counter-compony Argent and Azure. Motto Et Decus Et Pretium Recti ("The ornament and recompense of virtue")

Peerage of England
Preceded by Alfred FitzRoy	Duke of Grafton; 1930–1936	Succeeded by Charles FitzRoy
Preceded by Alfred FitzRoy	Earl of Arlington; 1930–1936	In abeyance
Preceded by Alfred FitzRoy	Baron Arlington; 1930–1936	In abeyance Title next held by Jennifer Forwood
