= Marquess of Willingdon =

Title in the Peerage of the United Kingdom

Marquessate of Willingdon
- Blazon Arms:Quarterly: 1st and 4th argent, three lions rampant gules, a chief azure (Thomas); 2nd and 3rd ermine, two pallets azure, over all three fusils conjoined in fesse or (Freeman). Crest: 1st, a demi-lion rampant gules charged on the shoulder with an ermine spot argent (Thomas); 2nd, issuant out of an antique crown azure, a boar's head proper (Freeman). Supporters: On either side a freeman armed cap-à-pie in English armour of the 17th century proper. Motto: Honesty is the best policy.
- Creation date: 26 May 1936
- Created by: King Edward VIII
- First holder: Freeman Freeman-Thomas, 1st Earl of Willingdon
- Last holder: Inigo Freeman-Thomas, 2nd Marquess of Willingdon
- Subsidiary titles: Earl of Willingdon; Viscount Willingdon; Viscount Ratendone; Baron Willingdon
- Status: Extinct
- Extinction date: 19 March 1979
- Motto: Honesty Is The Best Policy

Marquess of Willingdon was a title in the Peerage of the United Kingdom. It was created on 26 May 1936 for the Liberal politician and colonial governor Freeman Freeman-Thomas, 1st Earl of Willingdon. He was Governor General of Canada from 1926 to 1931 and Viceroy of India from 1931 to 1936.

Freeman-Thomas had previously been created Baron Willingdon, of Ratton in the County of Sussex, in 1910, Viscount Willingdon, of Ratton in the County of Sussex, on 23 June 1924, and on 20 February 1931, on his retirement as Governor General of Canada, he was made Viscount Ratendone, of Willingdon in the County of Sussex, and Earl of Willingdon. (Ratendone was the Domesday Book spelling of the Freeman-Thomas's ancestral home in Ratton, Sussex.) These titles were also in the Peerage of the United Kingdom.

Upon his death in 1941, the 1st Marquess of Willingdon was succeeded by his only surviving son, Inigo. Inigo was a soldier and also served as Liberal Chief Whip in the House of Lords from 1948 to 1949. Though married three times, he was childless and all the titles became extinct upon his death in 1979.

The marquessate of Willingdon was the most recent marquessate to be created in the Peerage of the United Kingdom. The most recently created extant marquessate is now that of Reading, created in 1926.

== Marquesses of Willingdon (1936) ==
- Freeman Freeman-Thomas, 1st Marquess of Willingdon (1866–1941)
  - Hon. Gerard Frederick Freeman-Thomas (4 May 1893 † 14 September 1914)
- Inigo Brassey Freeman-Thomas, 2nd Marquess of Willingdon (1899–1979)
