= Fitzroy (surname) =

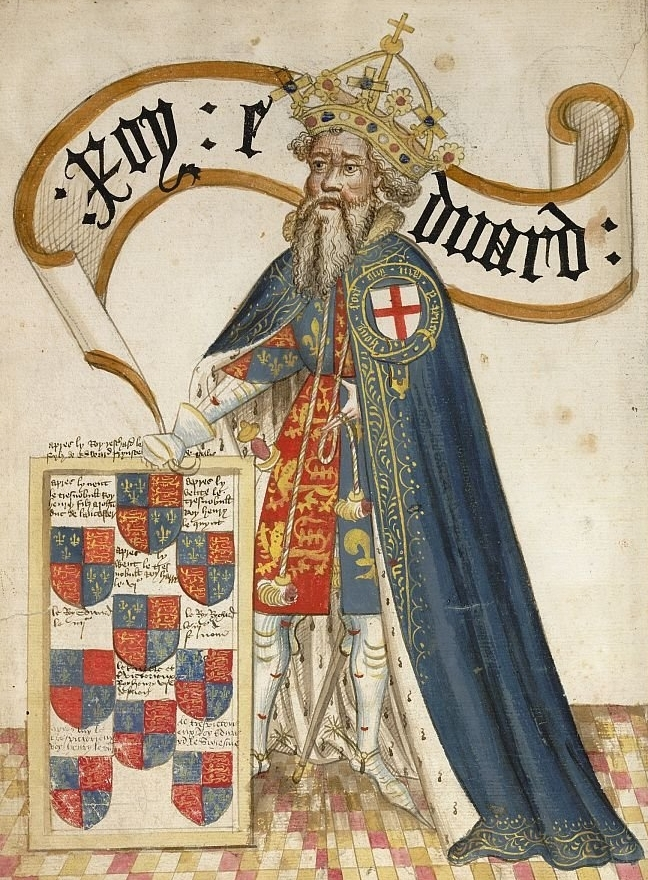
- "Roy" Edward III, Bruges Garter Book.
- Gender: Male

Origin
- Origin: Anglo-Norman
- Meaning: Son of the King
- Region of origin: England

Other names
- Related names: Fitz, Roy, Leroy, Leroi

Fitzroy, FitzRoy or Fitz Roy is a patronymic surname derived from the Anglo-Norman Fi(t)z "son of" and Roy "king". The name implied the original bearer was a "son of the king".

== Children of Charles II ==
Illegitimate children of Charles II of England known by the name FitzRoy include:

- Anne Lennard, Countess of Sussex or Lady Anne Fitzroy (1661–1722)
- Lady Barbara FitzRoy (1672–1731)
- Charles FitzRoy, 2nd Duke of Cleveland (1662–1730)
  - William FitzRoy, 3rd Duke of Cleveland (1698–1774), his son and last of the Cleveland-Southampton line
- Charlotte Lee, Countess of Lichfield (Charlotte FitzRoy, 1664–1718)
- Charlotte Paston, Countess of Yarmouth (Charlotte Jemima Henrietta Maria Paston, née FitzRoy; c. 1650 – 1684)
- George FitzRoy, Duke of Northumberland (1665–1716)
- Henry FitzRoy, 1st Duke of Grafton (1663–1690)
- James Scott, 1st Duke of Monmouth (1649–1685), originally called James Crofts or James Fitzroy

== Dukes of Grafton, Earls of Euston and Barons Southampton and ==
- FitzRoy is the family name of the Dukes of Grafton, with subsidiary titles Earl of Euston, Viscount Ipswich, and Baron Sudbury, and the related Barons Southampton.

== Children of Henry I ==
- Alice FitzRoy, or Alix or Aline (d. before 1141), illegitimate daughter of King Henry I of England
- Fulk FitzRoy (c. 1092 – 1132), illegitimate son of Henry I of England
- Robert, 1st Earl of Gloucester (c. 1090 – 1147), an illegitimate son of King Henry I

== Children of other kings ==
- Adam FitzRoy (died 1322), illegitimate son of Edward II of England
- Philip of Cognac or Philip FitzRoy (died 1220), illegitimate son of Richard I of England
- Richard FitzRoy (c. 1190 – 1246), son of King John of England
- Henry FitzRoy (c. 1519 – 1536), son of King Henry VIII of England

== Other people with the surname ==
- Almeric FitzRoy (1851–1935), British civil servant
- Augustus FitzRoy (disambiguation), several people
- Cecil Fitzroy (1844–1917), New Zealand politician
- Charles FitzRoy (disambiguation), several people
- Charlotte Fitzroy (disambiguation), several people
- Edi Fitzroy (1955–2017), Jamaican reggae singer
- Edward FitzRoy (1869–1943), British politician and Speaker of the House of Commons
  - Muriel FitzRoy, 1st Viscountess Daventry, his wife
- Emily Fitzroy (1860–1954), English actress in the United States
- George FitzRoy (disambiguation), several people
- Henry FitzRoy (disambiguation), several people
- Isabella FitzRoy (disambiguation), several people
- Izo FitzRoy (Isobel FitzRoy, born 1985), English musician
- James FitzRoy (disambiguation), several people
- John FitzRoy (disambiguation), several people
- Matilda FitzRoy (disambiguation), several people
- Maurice FitzRoy (1897–1976), English cricketer
- Nancy Deloye Fitzroy (1927–2024), American engineer
- Olga FitzRoy, (b. 1982), German-born British politician and sound engineer
- Olivia FitzRoy (1921–1969), British author of children's books
- Robert FitzRoy (1805–1865), Royal Navy officer, Captain of HMS Beagle
  - Robert O'Brien FitzRoy (1839–1896), Royal Navy officer, son of Robert FitzRoy
- William FitzRoy (disambiguation), several people

== Fictional characters ==
- Trevor Fitzroy, a Marvel Comics and X-Men villain
- Daisy Fitzroy, a character in Bioshock series
- Walter Fitzroy, better known as Fuse, a playable character in the game Apex Legends

== See also ==
- Fitzroy (given name)
- Admiral FitzRoy (disambiguation)
- General FitzRoy (disambiguation)
