= Fitzroy =

Fitzroy or FitzRoy may refer to:

== People ==
- Fitzroy (surname), including a list of people and fictional characters with the surname
- Fitzroy (given name), including a list of people and fictional characters with the given name
- Izo FitzRoy, an English singer, songwriter, and musician

== Places ==
=== Australia ===
- Fitzroy, South Australia, a suburb of Adelaide
- Fitzroy, Victoria, a suburb of Melbourne
  - Fitzroy railway station, Melbourne
  - Electoral district of Fitzroy (Victoria)
- Shire of Fitzroy, Queensland
  - Electoral district of Fitzroy (Queensland)
- Fitzroy County, New South Wales
- Fitzroy Island (Queensland)
  - Fitzroy Island National Park
- Fitzroy Islands (Tasmania)

=== New Zealand ===
- Fitzroy, Hamilton
- Fitzroy, New Plymouth
  - Fitzroy railway station, New Zealand
- Port Fitzroy, Great Barrier Island

=== Elsewhere ===
- Fitzroy, Falkland Islands
- Fitz Roy, a mountain in Patagonia on the border between Argentina and Chile
- Fitz Roy, Santa Cruz, Argentina
- Fitzroy Channel, a river in Chile
- Fitzroy Harbour, a town in Ontario, Canada
  - Fitzroy Provincial Park
- Fitzroy Island (Antarctica)
- Fitzroy Township, Ontario, Canada
- FitzRoy, a Shipping Forecast sea area in the Atlantic Ocean

== Sport ==
- Fitzroy Baseball Club, in Fitzroy, Victoria, Australia
- Fitzroy Football Club (disambiguation), several uses
- Fitzroy SC (disambiguation), several uses

== Other uses ==
- Fitzroy (1912), a steamship
- HMS Fitzroy, several ships of the Royal Navy
- The Fitzroy, an apartment building in New York City, US
- Fitzroy Tavern, a pub in Fitzrovia, London, England
- Fitzroy High School, Fitzroy, Melbourne, Australia

== See also ==
- Fitzroy Bay (New Zealand)
- Fitzroy Crossing, Western Australia
- Fitzroy Falls, New South Wales, Australia
- Fitzroy House, in Lewes, East Sussex, England
- Fitzroy Park, in Highgate, London, England
- Fitzroy Place (disambiguation)
- Fitzroy River Barrage (disambiguation)
- Fitzroy River (disambiguation)
- Fitzroy Road, Primrose Hill, London, England
- Fitzroy Square, London, England
- Fitzroy Street (disambiguation)
- Fitzroya, a genus of tree
- Fitzrovia, an area of London, England
- Admiral Fitzroy Inn, Newport, RI, US
