= Exhibition 211 =

Coordinates: 40.722637°N 73.994315°W

Exhibition 211 (at the time referred to as simply 'Exhibition' or '211') was an art exhibition that ran from March to August 2009 in New York City. It was initiated through a series of discussions between Warren Neidich and Mathieu Copelands in 2010 in Paris and New York City. But the series of instruments for its production, like the role of the roll of dice, the picking of cut up names out of a hat and the rules of engagement, see below, came later through discussions between Warren Neidich and Eric Angles. These were further formulated when the program was initiated and programmed by artist friends Elena Bajo, Eric Anglès, Jakob Schillinger, Nathalie Anglès, and Warren Neidich, offering "an experimental and contradictory artistic and curatorial approach", notably a set of rules, defining when, where, and who by, artistic interventions would take place.

The project was established in the loaned storefront of 211 Elizabeth, a luxury condominium development. Being close to the New Museum, and two blocks from Prada and Armani, Exhibition spoke not only to the current economic climate, after the 2008 financial crisis, but the problems of art treated as a (luxury) commodity.

About Exhibition, Artist Diana Artus wrote: "The most important principle was that only one exhibition will be shown, during which time it will be in continuous development, as new people – artists, curators, and others known by the initiators – are invited to participate", she also wrote that "a fundamental aim was to provoke differences of opinion, rather than placate them."

Exhibition (211) exhibited over 50, and up to 100 artists, including: Boshko Boskovic, Mathieu Copeland, Loretta Fahrenholz, Donna Huanca , Sean Raspet, Alexis Knowlton, Liz Magic Laser, David Levine, An Te Lieu, Jen Liu, Jason Loebs, Emily Mast, Amy Patton, Georgia Sagri, Alexandre Singh

Mark Tribe, and B. Wurtz. Although each artist's work was not specifically identified due to the rules of adaptation and evolution involved in their participation.

== Rules ==
The approach, guided by a set of rules, became integral to the forms and conversations that pursued. Elena Bajo, Eric Anglès, Jakob Schillinger, Nathalie Anglès, and Warren Neidich discussed many potential artists to be invited, the names of which were then put into, and subsequently drawn from a hat. The artist would then be invited to space and asked if they would work with the concept and requirements:

- 1. The artist is drawn from a hat.
- 2. The artist works in one of six areas determined by a roll of dice.
- 3. The artist could then decide to add to, modify or clear out the section before going on.
- 1. The work is not for sale and belongs to no one.
- 2. The work is an intervention upon interventions.
- 3. The work can be modified, parasitized and destroyed.

On May 12, 2009, Kemi Ilesanmi described Exhibition for Art 21 Magazine: "at least every three days, there is a new artist intervention, and while they can make whatever manner of changes inside the space, artists may not remove their own art works afterwards."

The approach of Exhibition echoed the cut-up technique by Bryon Gysin and William S. Burroughs, which is also visible in Warren Neidich's own artistic practice.

The method is simple. Here is one way to do it. Take a page. Like this page. Now cut down the middle and cross the middle. You have four sections: 1 2 3 4 ... one two three four. Now rearrange the sections placing section four with section one and section two with section three. And you have a new page. Sometimes it says much the same thing. Sometimes something quite different--(cutting up political speeches is an interesting exercise)--in any case you will find that it says something and something quite definite. Take any poet or writer you fancy. Heresay, or poems you have read over many times. The words have lost meaning and life through years of repetition. Now take the poem and type out selected passages. Fill a page with excerpts. Now cut the page. You have a new poem. As many poems as you like. As many Shakespeare Rimbaud poems as you like.

== Topics and discussions ==
Reflecting on the standard exhibition format, where "under the right light and organized by a strict aesthetic, the works displayed and valued are typically individual, finished objects", Diana Artus explained that exhibitions are therefore generally complicit with capitalism: "extolling the rules of a market society".

Contrasting to this Exhibition worked against this system, "when an exhibition diverges from this format, the result is revealing not only art's continual complicity with capitalism, but also how, and with what consequences, the notion of such a ritual could be reconfigured". As a summary of the type of engagement between the collaborators in Exhibition Artus said at the end of her article: "The notion of striving in a competitive world is reinterpreted in such a way that is promising: not only are we struggling against each other, but – more importantly – for each other."

In an important dialogue between the founders, published by Art Lies, Elena Bajo further mused on the problem of capital explicit in exhibition formats: "Perhaps limiting actions to a specific site, which is free of rent, and creating a temporary time-frame of six months and a set of rules in which chance and conversation play a significant role frees us from the dangers of capitalistic assimilation that beset most large cultural institutions that rely on private funding."

"What is beyond doubt is the amazing density of heady conceptualizing and self-reflexive musing this echo chamber has been injecting into our daily conversation." said Eric Anglès, emphasizing that the social engagement became the most important factor, "what might at first glance look like a theater of freedom and constraint, the rehearsal of a tired dialectic between an artist/curator enforcing the law and an artist/Houdini dancing her way out of those shackles, is far more immediately and compellingly an experimental site where each one of us present in this space is made to decide, over and over again, how to face one other."

Given the complexity of the project, little documentation remains. Warren Neidich discussed the question of the archive "when this experiment closes on the last day of August, what traces will be left for future audiences now transformed into historical readers? Is having a physical archive a complete contradiction to the spirit of the project? Or is it a form of generosity?"
