= Warren Neidich =

American artist (born 1958)

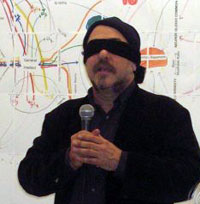
- Warren Neidich performance at The Drawing Center in 2009. Photograph by Chris Lee.
- Known for: Contemporary art
- Awards: Vilém Flusser Theory Award 2010, presented at Transmediale, Fulbright Program Scholar Fellowship, Fine Arts Category, 2013

Warren Neidich (/ˈnaɪdɪk/ NYE-dik/; born 1958) is an American conceptual artist, theorist, and educator whose multimedia work explores the intersection of art, neuroscience, social justice, and the digital age. Operating between Los Angeles and Berlin, he transforms complex scientific and philosophical ideas into installations, writings, and public art projects. He was a professor at Kunsthochschule Weißensee School of Art, Berlin and Goldsmiths, London.

Neidich is founding director of the Saas-Fee Summer Institute of Art (SFSIA). He has collaborated with artists, curators and critics including: Barry Schwabsky (co-director of SFSIA), Armen Avanessian, Nicolas Bourriaud, Tiziana Terranova, Franco Berardi, Hans-Ulrich Obrist, Isaac Julien, Hito Steyerl, Chris Kraus (American writer), and many others.

His work has been exhibited at numerous institutions including: MoMA PS1, Whitney Museum of American Art, LACMA – Los Angeles County Museum of Art, California Museum of Photography, ICA – Institute of Contemporary Arts, London, Museum Ludwig, Cologne, and Walker Art Center, Minneapolis, Minnesota.

In relation to his exhibitions and extended theories he has edited and published over 10 books, including Neuromacht, Merve Verlag (German), 2017, the Psychopathologies of Cognitive Capitalism: Part One (2013), Two (2014), and Three (2017), Archive Books (English), the Noologist's Handbook and Other Art Experiments, Anagram, 2013, From Noopower to Neuropower: How Mind Becomes Matter, 2010 and, Cognitive Architecture. From Biopolitics to Noopolitics. Architecture & Mind in the Age of Communication and Information, 2010.

He was collaborator, along with Elena Bajo and others, on Exhibition 211 in New York, 2009.

== Main themes ==
A major theme in Neidich's practice can widely be summarised as neuroaesthetics (not to be confused with mainstream neuroesthetics), an area of critical and constructive thought, which can loosely be seen as the confluent impact of the brain on a cultured environment and, importantly, vice versa, upon which he began lecturing in 1996 at the School of Visual Arts in New York City. His website artbrain.org, which includes The Journal of Neuro-Aesthetic Theory, was published online in 1997. Cognitive capitalism (cognitive-cultural economy), 'critical' neuroscience, neuroplasticity, post-Workerism, immaterial labor, and epigenesis are recurring themes since 1996, while earlier themes, between 1985 and 1996, were interested in culturally based work about race, politics, historical reenactment, fictive documentary, staging, photographic practice, the archive, and anachronistic technology.

On these topics he has published several books including: Neuromacht, 2017, Psychopathologies of Cognitive Capitalism: Part One, Two, and Three, The Noologist's Handbook and Other Art Experiments, 2013, From Noopower to Neuropower: How Mind Becomes Matter, 2010 and Cognitive Architecture (From Biopolitics to Noopolitics. Architecture & Mind in the Age of Communication and Information), 2010, and Blow Up: Photography, Cinema and the Brain, 2003.

Neidich's work has examined the co-evolution of the history of art, brain, and mind, which provides a critical foundation to his understanding of neuroaesthetics as an ontologic process. The key to neuroaesthetics is the investigation of apparatuses in which a network of heterogeneous discourses is administered. As the world and technology change, so to the apparatuses which organize it, and the cognitive strategies with which one can understand it. This is especially true of the information age, which distributes such apparatuses non-linearly and profusely. Neidich's work is inspired by Michael Snow, Stan Brakhage, Jean-Luc Godard and the Apparatus Theory of Stephen Heath.

== Studies and teaching ==
Warren Neidich has studied in diverse fields since 1970 including Photography, Psychology, Biology, (BA Magna Cum Laude Washington University in St. Louis), Neurobiology (as research fellow at California Institute of Technology, under the laboratory of Roger Wolcott Sperry who later won the 1981 Nobel Prize in Physiology and Medicine) and Architecture, he is also a Board Certified Ophthalmologist from Tulane Medical Center.

Neidich has collaborated with Goldsmiths College on several occasions since 2003, when he served as a visiting artist and lecturer. In 2005, he organized the first symposium on Neuroaesthetics and in 2014, with Mark Fisher, he organized a symposium titled 'The Psychopathologies of Cognitive Capitalism: The Cognitive Turn Organized'.

At the Delft School of Design, Delft University of Technology in the Netherlands (where he was a PhD candidate under Professor Dr. Arie Graafland), in 2008, he co-organized "Architecture in Mind: From Biopolitics to Noo politics."

== Art practice and theories ==
=== Early works (1985–1996) ===
From 1985 to 1997 Neidich worked on a number of projects investigating the relationship between power and representation, focusing on reenactment, staging, fictive documentary and performance. Major works from this time include the American Civil War studies The Battle of Chickamauga and Amputation without Anaesthesia exhibited at The Photographic Resource Center, Boston in 1991 and "American History Reinvented" (1986–1991) at Burden Gallery, Aperture Foundation, New York City, in 1989. Neidich's appropriation of historical moments by means of photography has been discussed by John Welchman, Christopher Phillips, Graham Clarke, and David Joselit.

The series of altered photographs "Unknown Artist", which recast the early 20th-century art coterie as a social rather than an individual phenomenon, were installed at Berlin's Paris Bar in 1994 in collaboration with Martin Kippenberger and Michel Wertle.

In 1994, Neidich's photography-based sculptural installation Collective Memory and Collective Amnesia (1991–94) used the culturally-constructed story of Anne Frank to reflect upon pop culture's vulgarization of history. Neidich's slide show projection "Beyond the Vanishing Point: Media Myth in America" was shown at N.Y. Kunsthalle, NYC in 1995. It traced a journey across America fifty years after Jack Kerouac, culminating in a surrealist photographic exposé of the media encampment that grew outside the courthouse during the O.J. Simpson trial in Los Angeles (1995–97). The book Camp O.J., published by D.A.P. exposed the condition of infotainment.

=== The introduction of Neuroaesthetics (1996–2002) ===
In 1996 Neidich, began to explore the phenomenological conditions surrounding the cultural and historical aspects of his work. These research projects took the form of texts and lectures entitled "Neuroaesthetics", first delivered at the School of Visual Arts in New York, 1995–1996, when Neidich was visiting lecturer in the Department of Photography and Related Media under Charles Traub. In 1997, with the help of Nathalie Angles, the current director of Residency Unlimited, he launched the platform artbrain.org, consisting of The Journal of Neuroaesthetics and Netspace Gallery. Neuroaesthetics, (differing from the scientific approach with the same name often spelled neuroesthetics), believes that artists in all their modes such as poetry, cinema, installation art and architecture, using their own spaces, apparatuses, materials, sense of time, and performative gestures, can elaborate truths about the noumenal and phenomenal world on part with those generated by the sciences. These truths compete effectively in the marketplace of ideas.

The post-structuralist brain/mind/body/world complex, in which cultural mutations are transposed into parallel changes in the mind, brain and body, expressed in works such as "Brainwash" (1997), Neidich's first application of his hybrid dialectics, developed greater tenacity in 1999 when Neidich curated "Conceptual Art as Neurobiological Praxis" at Thread Waxing Space in New York which "rather than being a show about the collaboration between art and science or a reductive methodology of how the brain works, the exhibition attempted to promote the idea of a becoming brain" and included artists: Uta Barth, Sam Durant, Charline von Heyl, Jason Rhoades, Liam Gillick, Douglas Gordon, Thomas Ruff, Simon Grennan and Christopher Sperandio, and others.

Neidich's video-works from this period include Apparatus, Memorial Day (1998), Kiss, and Law of Loci(1998–99). The exhibitions "The Mutated Observer Part 1" (2001), and "The Mutated Observer Part 2" (2002) at the California Museum of Photography showcased a number of handmade apparatuses, so-called "Hybrid Dialectics", in vitrines adjacent to those of the museum's collection.

=== Recent work (2006–2017) ===
Neidich's essay The Neurobiopolitics of Global Consciousness, published in the Sarai Reader 'Turbulence' in 2006, clearly connected the ideas of neural plasticity, epigenesis and Empire. Topics such as Neuro biopolitics were extended to include the political impact of immaterial labor and the Information Age on the production of architecture and built space, specifically in relation to the ways in which intense sensory and perceptual effect are now used to organize cultural attention.

These ideas later evolved into a series of performative drawings staged in his studio at IASPIS in Stockholm (2008) and at The Drawing Center, New York (2009). The same year Neidich also organized the conference "The Power of Art" at The Drawing Center, New York.

In 2008 Onomatopee published Neidich's book Lost Between the Extensivity-Intensivity Exchange for which he outlined that the "inauguration of the 21st century could be described as a time of cultural torpor resulting from free floating anxiety, ambivalence, and wavering", going on to say, "the condition, suggested by the title, that of being lost in the ‘in-between zone’ of extensive and intensive labor and two evolving partially incommensurable world views, the local (tribal) and global (cosmopolitan) or the nation-state and the Earthling, merged"

"What has become obvious to me is that in our moment of cognitive capitalism in which the brain and mind are the new factories of the twenty-first century, forms of activism invented during industrial capitalism like refusal to work, absenteeism, and labor strikes are no longer up to the task" – Warren Neidich 2017

In Pizzagate (2017) Neidich returned to his earlier work on apparatus entitled 'Hybrid Dialectics' (1997–2003). In the work he delineates the new apparatuses of the knowledge economy like clickbait and memes as they produce new forms of subjectivity.

=== Drive-By-Art ===
In May 2020, in response to the impact of the COVID-19 epidemic, Neidich curated the exhibition Drive-By-Art (Public Art in This Moment of Social Distancing) which took place at various locations, first in the Hamptons and then later in Los Angeles. The exhibitions featured work by 174 artists spread over multiple locations in "an attempt to bring back a sense of solidarity to the artistic and cultural community". The exhibition was featured in numerous publications including Artforum, Time, The Chicago Tribune and The New York Times.

== Saas-Fee Summer Institute of Art ==
The Saas-Fee Summer Institute of Art (SFSIA) is a nomadic academy that originated in Saas-Fee, Switzerland in 2015, and moved to Berlin in 2016 where it could engage with the local active art scene. SFSIA maintains the moniker today simply as a nod to its origins. It was founded by fine artist and theorist Warren Neidich, and is co-directed by art critic and poet Barry Schwabsky. The school has included many notable collaborators in workshops or as speakers. SFSIA was born as a parallel program to the activities at the neighboring European Graduate School (EGS), sharing the evening public program, however with no formal connection.

Schwabsky, in conversation with Jennifer Teets for Art & Education, has described his desire for the school to respond to a "crisis" across the sector wherein art academies are "controlled by administrators—not by faculty—an ever-expanding layer of bureaucrats who are removed from the real needs of students and the realities of teaching and research."

Each year SFSIA has approached a new theme, the founding being 'Art and the Politics of Estrangement' (2015), followed by 'Art and the Politics of Individuation: Affect and the Multiple Body in Cognitive Capitalism' (2016) and 'Art & the Politics of Collectivity' (2017). The 2018 program circulates around the theme of 'Art and Politics in the Age of Cognitive Capitalism' and will take place in Los Angeles and Berlin.

List of collaborators:

- Elena Agudio (2017)
- Marie-Luise Angerer (2017)
- Julieta Aranda (2016)
- Armen Avanessian (2015)
- Defne Ayas (2017)
- Elena Bajo (2016)
- Heidi Ballet (2017)
- Franco Berardi 'Bifo' (2015, 2017)
- Benjamin Bratton (2015)
- Nicolas Bourriaud (2017)
- Arne De Boever (2017)
- Yann Moulier-Boutang (2017)
- Mathieu Copeland (2015, 2017)
- Jodi Dean (2017)
- Nikola Dietrich (2017)
- Keller Easterling (2015)
- Gale Elston (2015)
- Oriol Fontdevila (2016)
- Anselm Franke (2015)
- Charles Gaines (2015)
- Julieta Gonzalez (2017)
- Krist Gruijthuijsen (2017)
- Anke Hennig (2015)
- Robby Herbst (2017)
- Helen Hester (2017)
- Yuk Hui (2017)
- Isaac Julien (2017)
- Sanford Kwinter (2015)
- Brandon LaBelle (2017)
- Quinn Latimer (2015)
- Dan Levenson (2017)
- Deborah Ligorio (2017)
- Isabell Lorey (2017)
- Jens Maier-Rothe (2017)
- Antonia Majaca (2017)
- Lambros Malafouris (2017)
- Augustin Maurs (2017)
- Achim Menges (2015)
- Ari Benjamin Meyers (2017)
- Suzana Milevska (2015)
- Hans Ulrich Obrist (2017)
- Matteo Pasquinelli (2017)
- Peter Pelbart (2017)
- Susan Philipsz (2016)
- John Rajchman (2015)
- Gerald Raunig (2015, 2017)
- Dorothee Richter (2015)
- Tomás Saraceno (2016)
- Aaron Schuster (2016)
- Hito Steyerl (2015)
- Ludwig Seyfarth (2017)
- Eric Golo Stone (2015)
- Jennifer Teets (2017)
- Ana Teixeira Pinto (2016)
- Tiziana Terranova (2017)
- Ben Vickers (2015, 2017)
- Anuradha Vikram (2017)
- Joanna Warsza (2017)
- Markus Weisbeck (2017)
- Ming Wong (2017)

== Exhibitions ==
=== Selected solo exhibitions ===
- The Politics of Color, Kunstverein am Rosa-Luxemburg-Platz e.V., Berlin, DE (2017)
- The Palinopsic Field, Los Angeles Contemporary Exhibitions, Los Angeles, CA (2016)
- The Artists’ Library, LAXART, Los Angeles, CA
- Manifesta 10 Parallel Program, curated by Joanna Warsza, Saint Petersburg, RU (2014)
- The Townhouse Gallery, Cairo, EG (2013)
- Fons Welters Gallery, Amsterdam, NL(2011)
- Galerie Moriarty, Madrid (2011)
- Glenn Horowitz Gallery, East Hampton, NY, US (2010)
- Gallery Magnus Müller, Berlin (2008)
- Trolley Gallery, London (2007)
- Andrew Mummery Gallery, New York (2006)
- Storefront for Art and Architecture, New York (2002)
- Laguna Art Museum, Laguna Beach, CA (2001)
- UCR/California Museum of Photography, Riverside, CA (2001)
- Villa Arson, Nice, France (1994)
- Photographic Resource Center, Boston University (1991)
- MIT's List Visual Arts Center, Cambridge, MA (1991)
- Aperture Foundation, New York (1989)

=== Selected group exhibitions ===
- The Search Drive, Globale: Infosphäre at Center for Art and Media Karlsruhe, curated by Peter Weibel, Daria Mille and Giulia Bini, Karlsruhe (2015)
- The Fax Show, Drawing Center, curated by João Ribas, New York (2009)
- Everything is connected he, he, he, Astrup Fearnley Museum of Modern Art, Oslo, Norway (2004)
- Bitstreams, Whitney Museum of American Art, New York (2001)
- Ports of Entry: William S. Burroughs and the Arts, Los Angeles County Museum of Art, curated by Robert Sobieszek, Los Angeles (1996)
- Photography of Invention, (touring exhibition), Smithsonian American Art Museum, Museum of Contemporary Art, Chicago and Walker Art Center, curated by Joshua Smith (1989)
- Queens Museum, Queens, New York (1988)
- Museum Ludwig, Cologne, Germany (1988)
- White Columns, New York (1988)

== Public projects ==
- 2004 Madrid Abierto Public Sculpture, Madrid, Spain

== Books ==
- The Color of Politics, BOM DIA BOA TARDE BOA NOITE, 2018.
- Neuromacht, Merve Verlag (German), 2017.
- Psychopathologies of Cognitive Capitalism: Part One (2013), Two (2014), and Three (2017), Archive Books (English).
- The Noologist's Handbook and Other Art Experiments, Anagram, 2013.
- From Noopower to Neuropower: How Mind Becomes Matter, 2010.
- Cognitive Architecture. From Biopolitics to Noopolitics. Architecture & Mind in the Age of Communication and Information, 2010.
- Lost Between the Extensivity/Intensivity Exchange, Onomatopee, 2009.
- Earthling, Pointed Leaf Press, New York, NY, 2005.
- Blow-up: Photography, Cinema and the Brain, DAP/UCR/California Museum of Photography, 2003.
- Camp O.J., Bayly Art Museum, 2001.
- Cultural Residue: Contamination and Decontamination, Villa Arson, Nice, France, 1994.
- Unknown Artist, Fricke and Schmid, 1994.
- Historical in (Tervention), MIT List Visual Arts Center, 2001.
- American History Reinvented, Aperture, 1989.
