= Chela Sandoval =

American feminist scholar

- Born: 31 July 1956 (age 69); San Jose

Chela Sandoval (born July 31, 1956), associate professor of Chicana Studies at University of California, Santa Barbara, is a noted theorist of postcolonial feminism and third world feminism. Beginning with her 1991 pioneering essay 'U.S. Third World Feminism: The Theory and Method of Oppositional Consciousness in the Postmodern World', Sandoval emerged as a significant voice for women of color and decolonial feminism.

== Personal life ==
Sandoval was born and raised in San Jose, California. She has described her working-class parents as a "machinist/philosopher father", Jose Machlavio Lucero-Sandoval and a "warehouse-fork-lift driver/spiritual-activist mother", Pearl Antonia Doria-Sandoval. She has four sisters, Janet, Robin, Sandy and Julie.

== Education ==
Sandoval received a bachelor of arts and a bachelor of science from UC Santa Cruz. She became interested in feminism in 1971 when she enrolled in a course "Women in Literature". As a result of this course, she became involved in the Santa Cruz Women's Media Collective, a group that made television programming for a local public access channel. In 1978, Sandoval moved to New York to intern at ABC News, a position arranged for her by Barbara Walters. However, ultimately Sandoval decided to pursue a doctorate rather than documentary film career. In a 2005 interview, Sandoval explained her decision as motivated by a desire to make activism more effective.

"I felt the activism was...frustrating; we were repeating the same practices over and over again. I really needed to think about what we were committing our lives to, to see if there was another way to make positive social change. That's when I applied to HistCon to learn from activist- theorists and philosophers, in those early stages."

Her professors in the History of Consciousness program included Stephen Heath, Teresa de Lauretis, Vivian Sobchack and Janey Place. She has cited Hayden White, Donna Haraway, James Clifford and Teresa de Lauretis as her mentors at Santa Cruz. Although she initially intended to write a dissertation on women and video, Sandoval's reading led her to philosophy. Her dissertation developed her first major theoretical contribution, the idea of oppositional consciousness.

Even as a graduate student, Sandoval played an important role in US feminism. She wrote a report on behalf of the Third World Women's Alliance following a divisive splintering around the 1981 National Women's Studies Association conference's theme of women and racism.

== Theories ==
Her most important work, Methodology of the Oppressed, developed fully her idea of a differential oppositional consciousness, a mode of "ideology-praxis" rooted in the experiences of US Third World that resists binary categories of identity in favor of a fluidity that moves between them. She credits Frederic Jameson with recognizing the idea of oppositional consciousness in her work and encouraging her to develop it, although her work is both a critique of and extension of Jameson's own work.

Sandoval's work has been widely influential within second wave feminism and her notion of oppositional consciousness is central to Donna Haraway's cyborg feminism. However the concept has been adopted by scholars working in many fields.

In more recent years, Sandoval has joined her earlier interests in culture with her work on oppositional consciousness to focus on what she terms artivism, a neologism she developed with Guisella LaTorre to describe activist art.

Sandoval has proposed anti-gender feminism as a type of feminism which regards gender as a harmful social construct based on the model of anti-racism discourse.

Sandoval is included in Brown University's Feminist Theory Archives.

== Works ==
- "Comment on Krieger's" Lesbian Identity and Community: Recent Social Science Literature"." Signs (1984): 725-729. JSTOR. Web.
- "Feminism and racism: A report on the 1981 National Women’s Studies Association Conference." Making Face, Making Soul: Creative and Critical Perspectives by Feminists of Color. Ed. Gloria Anzaldúa. San Francisco: Aunt Lute (1990): 55–71. Print
- "US third world feminism: The theory and method of oppositional consciousness in the postmodern world." Genders 10 (1991): 1-24.
- "Re-entering cyberspace: sciences of resistance." Dispositio (1994): 75–93. JSTOR. Web.
- "New Sciences: Cyborg Feminism and the Methodology of the Oppressed", in The Cyborg Handbook, ed. Chris Hables Gray. New York: Routledge, 1995. Print.
- "Theorizing white consciousness for a post-empire world: Barthes, Fanon, and the rhetoric of love." Displacing whiteness: Essays in Social and Cultural Criticism. Ed. Ruth Frankenberg. Duke UP,1997. 86-107. Print.
- "Mestizaje as method: Feminists-of-color challenge the canon." Living Chicana theory (1998): 352–370.
- Methodology of the Oppressed. By Chela Sandoval. Foreword by Angela Y. Davis. Minneapolis and London: University of Minnesota Press, 2000.
- "New Sciences: Cyborg Feminism", CyberSexualities: A Reader on Feminist Theory, Cyborgs and Cyberspace, Ed. Jenny Wolmark. University of Edinburgh Press, Britain, 2000.
- The Chicano Studies Reader: An Anthology of Aztlán, 1970–2000. Co-edited with Chon Noriega, KarenMary Davelos, and Rafael Perez-Torres. University of California Center for Chicano Research Center Publication, 2001.
- "Foreword: AfterBridge/Technologies of Crossing", In This Bridge We Called Home: Radical Visions for Transformation, Eds., Gloria Anzaldúa and AnaLouise Keating. Routledge UP, 2002. Print.
- "Dissident Globalizations, Emancipatory Methods, Social Erotics." By Chela Sandoval. In Queer Globalizations: Citizenship and the Afterlife of Colonialism. Edited by Arnaldo Cruz-Malave and Martin F. Manalansan. New York: New York University Press, 2002. Print.
- Sandoval, Chela, and Guisela Latorre. "Chicana/o artivism: Judy Baca’s digital work with youth of color." Learning race and ethnicity: Youth and digital media (2008): 81-108. Web.
