= Neidich =

Neidich is a surname. Notable people with the surname include:

- Charles Neidich (born 1953), American classical clarinetist, composer, and conductor
- Warren Neidich (born 1958), American artist
