= Matilda of England (disambiguation) =

Matilda of England or Empress Matilda (1102–1167) was the daughter and dispossessed heiress of Henry I.

Matilda of England may also refer to:

- Matilda of Flanders (c.1031 – 1083), Queen consort of England, consort to William I
- Matilda of Scotland (1080–1118), Queen consort of England, consort to Henry I
- Matilda of Boulogne (1105?–1152), Queen consort of England, consort to Stephen of England
- Matilda of England, Duchess of Saxony (1156–1189), daughter of Henry II of England

== See also ==
- Matilda FitzRoy (disambiguation)
