= Fitzroy Place =

Fitzroy Place may refer to:

- Fitzroy Place (Colorado), United States
- Fitzroy Place (London), England
