= Admiral FitzRoy (disambiguation) =

Robert FitzRoy (1805–1865) was a Royal Navy vice admiral known for being captain of HMS Beagle during Charles Darwin's voyage.

Admiral FitzRoy may also refer to:

== People ==
- Henry FitzRoy, Duke of Richmond and Somerset (1519–1536), Lord High Admiral of England, an honorary title with no corresponding authority
- Robert O'Brien FitzRoy (1839–1896), British Royal Navy vice admiral
- Lord William FitzRoy (1782–1857), British Royal Navy rear admiral

== Other uses ==
- Admiral Fitzroy Inn, Newport, RI, United States
- Admiral Fitzroy, a lifeboat at Anstruther Lifeboat Station, Scotland, 1865–1888
