= Fitzroy (given name) =

Fitzroy is a given name.

== Somerset family ==
Several members of the Somerset family (Dukes of Beaufort) have this as a given name or middle name:

- FitzRoy Somerset, 1st Baron Raglan (1788–1855)
- FitzRoy Somerset, 4th Baron Raglan (1885–1964)
- FitzRoy Somerset, 5th Baron Raglan (1927–2010)
- Charles Somerset, 8th Duke of Beaufort (Henry Charles FitzRoy Somerset; 1824–1899)
- Henry Somerset, 9th Duke of Beaufort (Henry Adelbert Wellington FitzRoy Somerset; 1847–1924)
- Henry Somerset, 10th Duke of Beaufort (Henry Hugh Arthur FitzRoy Somerset; 1900–1984)
- Henry Somerset, 12th Duke of Beaufort (Henry FitzRoy Somerset; born 1952), called Bunter Worcester

== Other people with the given name ==
- Lord Melody (Fitzroy Alexander, 1926–1988), a calypsonian from Trinidad
- Fitzroy Anstruther-Gough-Calthorpe (1872–1957), born FitzRoy Hamilton Niall Lloyd-Anstruther, English baronet
- Fitzroy Bedeau (born 1944), politician and police officer from Grenada
- Fitzroy Buffonge (born 1960), West Indian attorney and cricketer
- Fitzroy Brown (born 1959), Guyanese boxer
- Fitzroy Carrington (1869–1954), English-born American editor and authority on prints
- Fitzroy Crozier (born 1936), cricketer for Ceylon
- Fitzroy Dunkley (born 1993), Jamaican sprinte
- Fitzroy Gordon (1954–2019), Jamaican-Canadian broadcaster
- Fitzroy Hemphill, 3rd Baron Hemphill (1860–1930), Liberal Party politician
- Fitzroy Hutton (1894–1975), Royal Navy officer
- Fitzroy Henry Lee (1699–1750), Royal Navy officer and colonial administrator
- Fitzroy Hoyte (1940–2008), cyclist from Trinidad and Tobago
- Fitzroy Kelly (1796–1880), English commercial lawyer, politician and judge
- Sir Fitzroy Maclean, 1st Baronet (1911–1996), Scottish soldier, writer and politician
- Sir Fitzroy Maclean, 8th Baronet (c. 1770 – 1847)
- Sir Fitzroy Maclean, 10th Baronet of Morvern (1835–1936)
- Fitzroy Newsum (1918–2013), American military pilot
- Fitzroy Simpson (born 1970), English footballer
- Fitzroy Talbot (1909–1998), Royal Navy officer

== Fictional characters ==
- Fitzroy Vacker, a character from the Keeper of the Lost Cities book series

== See also ==
- Fitzroy (surname)
