= The Fitzroy =

Residential building in Chelsea, Manhattan

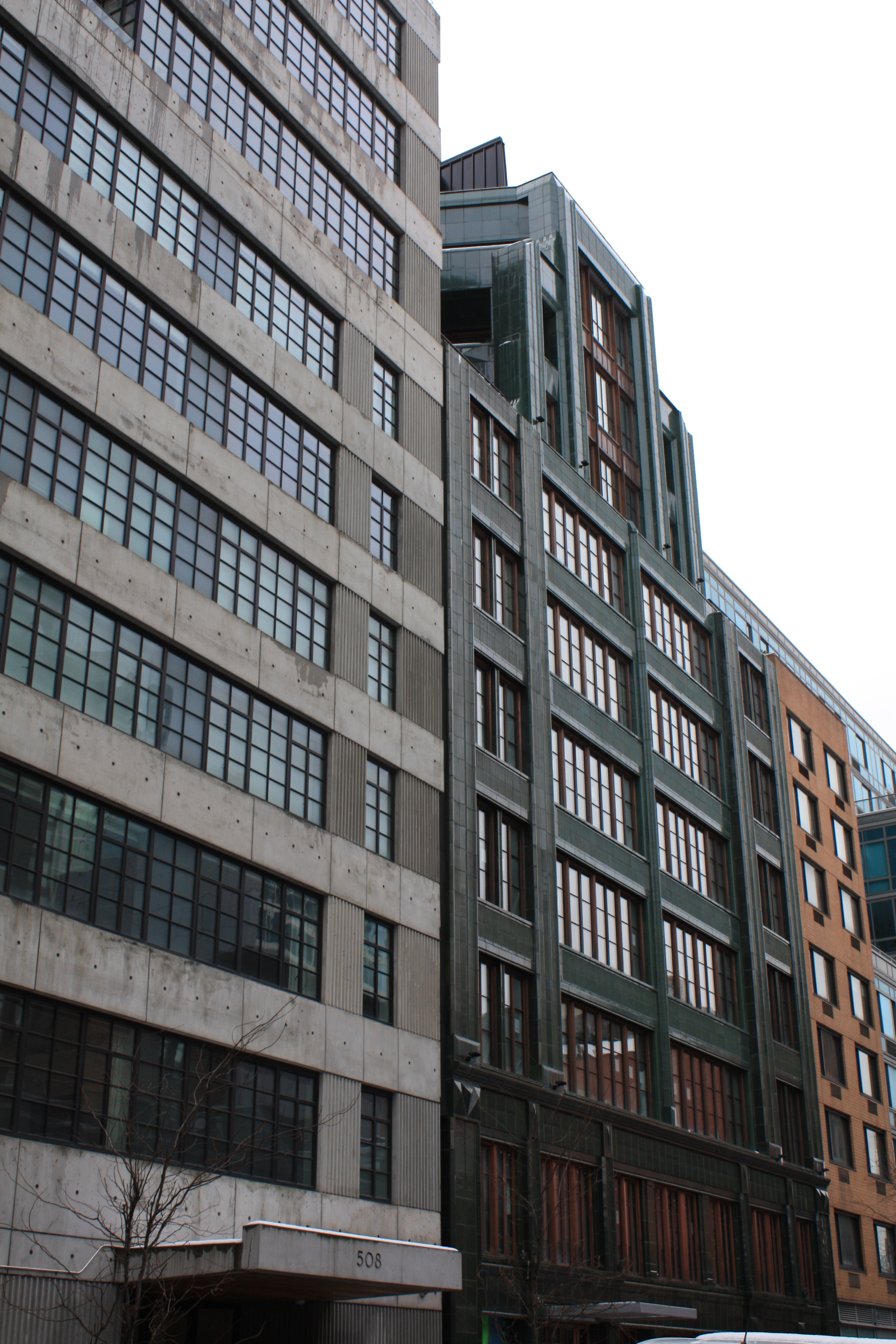
- The Fitzroy pictured to the right of 508 W. 24th.
- Interactive map of the The Fitzroy area

General information
- Status: Completed
- Type: Residential
- Location: 514 West 24th Street; Manhattan, New York City
- Coordinates: 40.748606°N 74.004846°W
- Construction started: 2015
- Topped-out: June 2017
- Completed: 2019

Height
- Roof: 120 feet (37 m)

Technical details
- Floor count: 10
- Floor area: 65,300 square feet (6,070 m^{2})

Design and construction
- Architect: Roman and Williams
- Developer: JDS Development Group and Largo

The Fitzroy is a ten-story residential building in the Chelsea neighborhood of Manhattan in New York City. The building was developed by Largo and JDS Development Group and designed by Roman and Williams, a New York City-based architecture and design team. It is the firm’s third building design, after 211 Elizabeth and the Viceroy Hotel.

== History and construction ==
JDS Development purchased the development site at 514 West 24th Street for $35 million in 2014. Preliminary plans for the building were released in early 2015. Largo and JDS Development secured a $57 million construction loan from Banco Santander for the structure in 2014 along with $17.5 million in preferred equity from First Key Residential. Renderings for the building were made available to the public in mid-2015.

The building broke ground in late 2015. Sales of units in the building also began late in 2015. The building topped out in June 2017. Installation of the building's facade ended in August 2018. Construction wrapped up in early 2019.

The building's name refers to a road in Chelsea that no longer exists.

== Design ==
Early designs for the building were first released in early 2015, with more developed versions released in July 2015. The building has received praise for its design.

The building is one of several in New York City designed and built around the same time featuring terra cotta. Buildings such as the Steinway Tower, designed by SHoP Architects and completed in 2021, and One Vanderbilt, designed by Kohn Pedersen Fox and completed in 2020, also use terra cotta.

== Usage and amenities ==
The building is exclusively residential, with fourteen apartments spread over ten stories. Amenities include wine cellars, extra storage, a children’s playroom, and a fitness center. The building also features eleven-foot ceilings, in response to the inclusion of tall ceilings in other luxury developments.

== Controversy ==
Gallery owner Mike Weiss claimed noise from the construction site forced him to close his business.

== Gallery ==
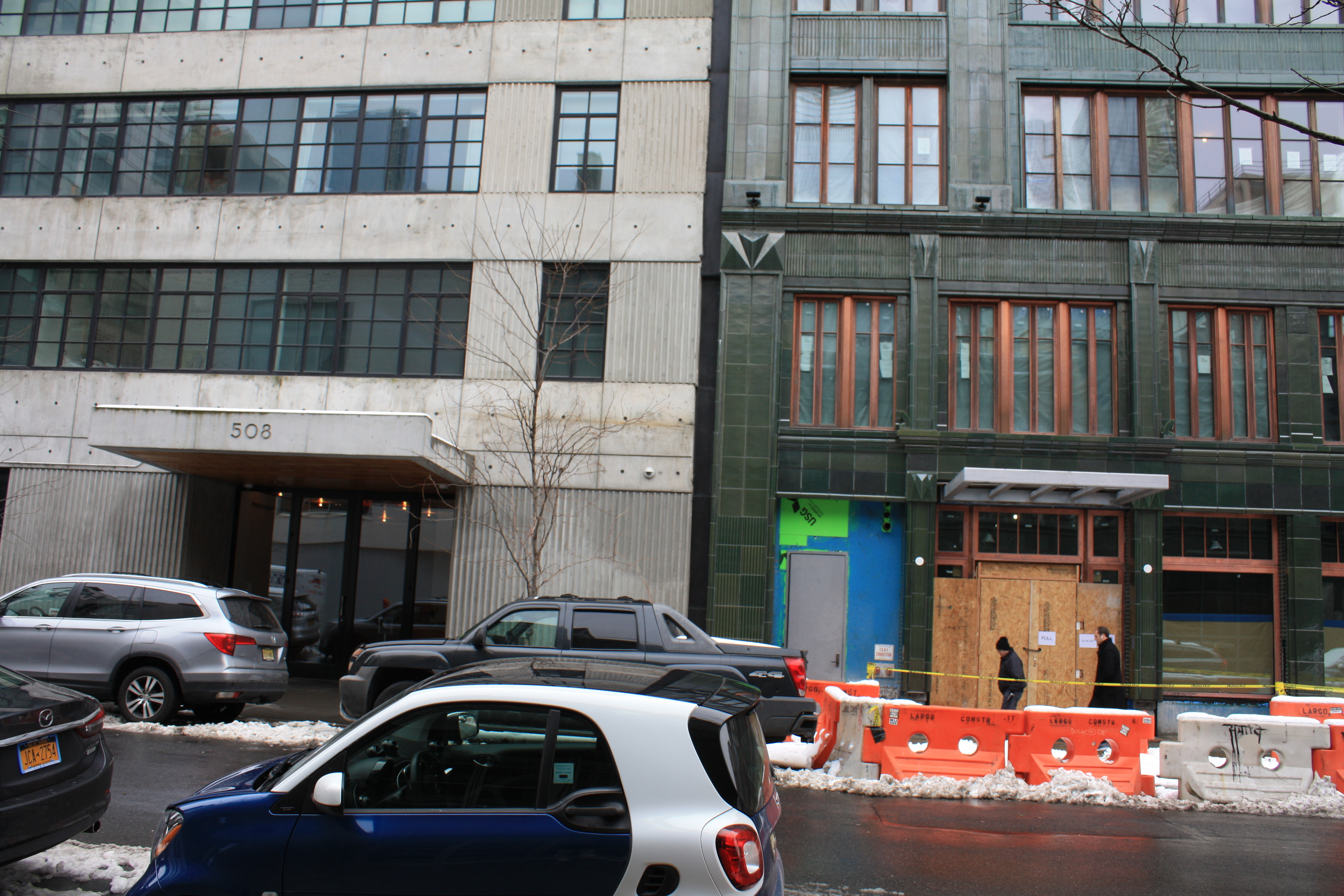
Facades of 508 W 24th & the Fitzroy

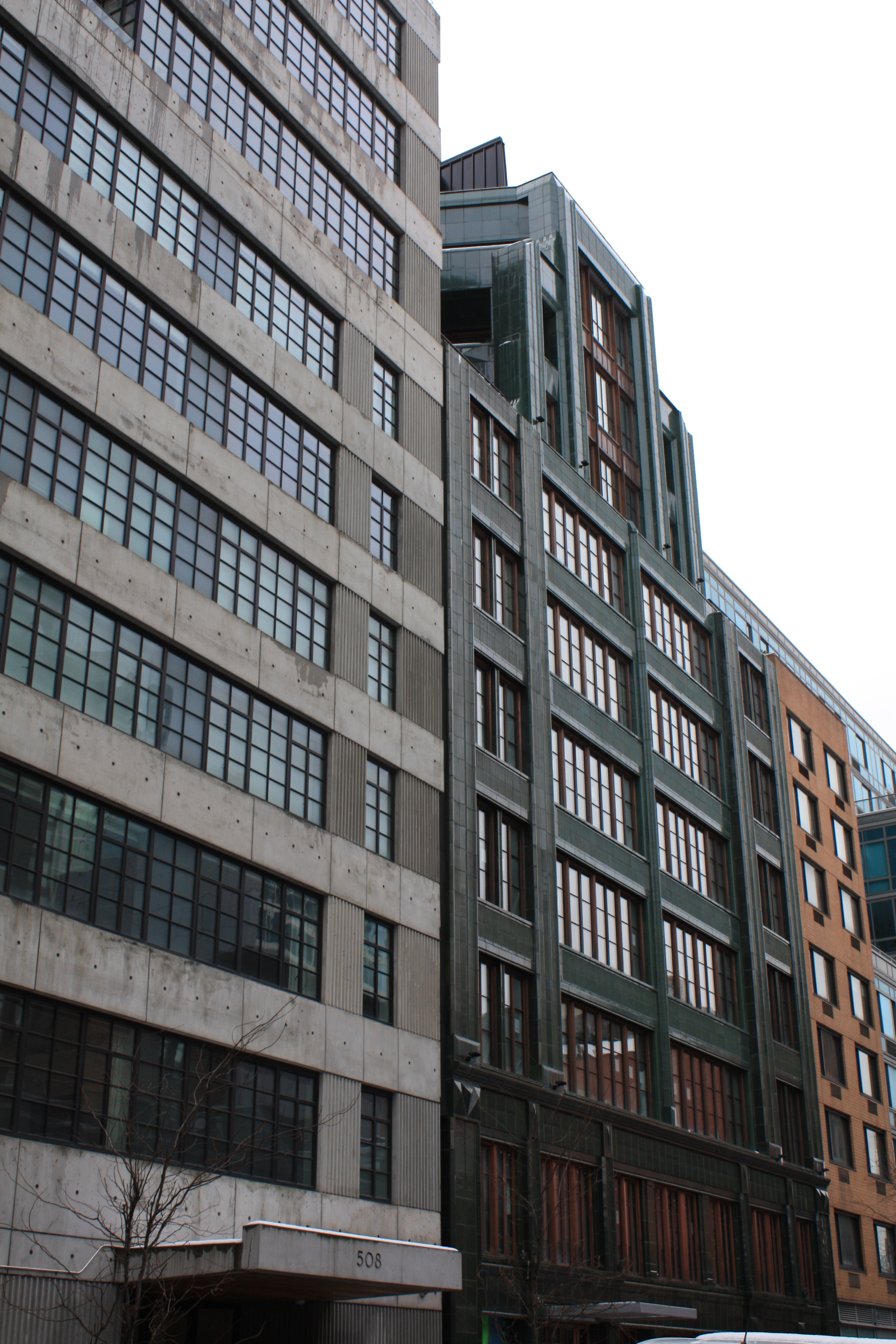
508 W 24th & the Fitzroy seen from the East

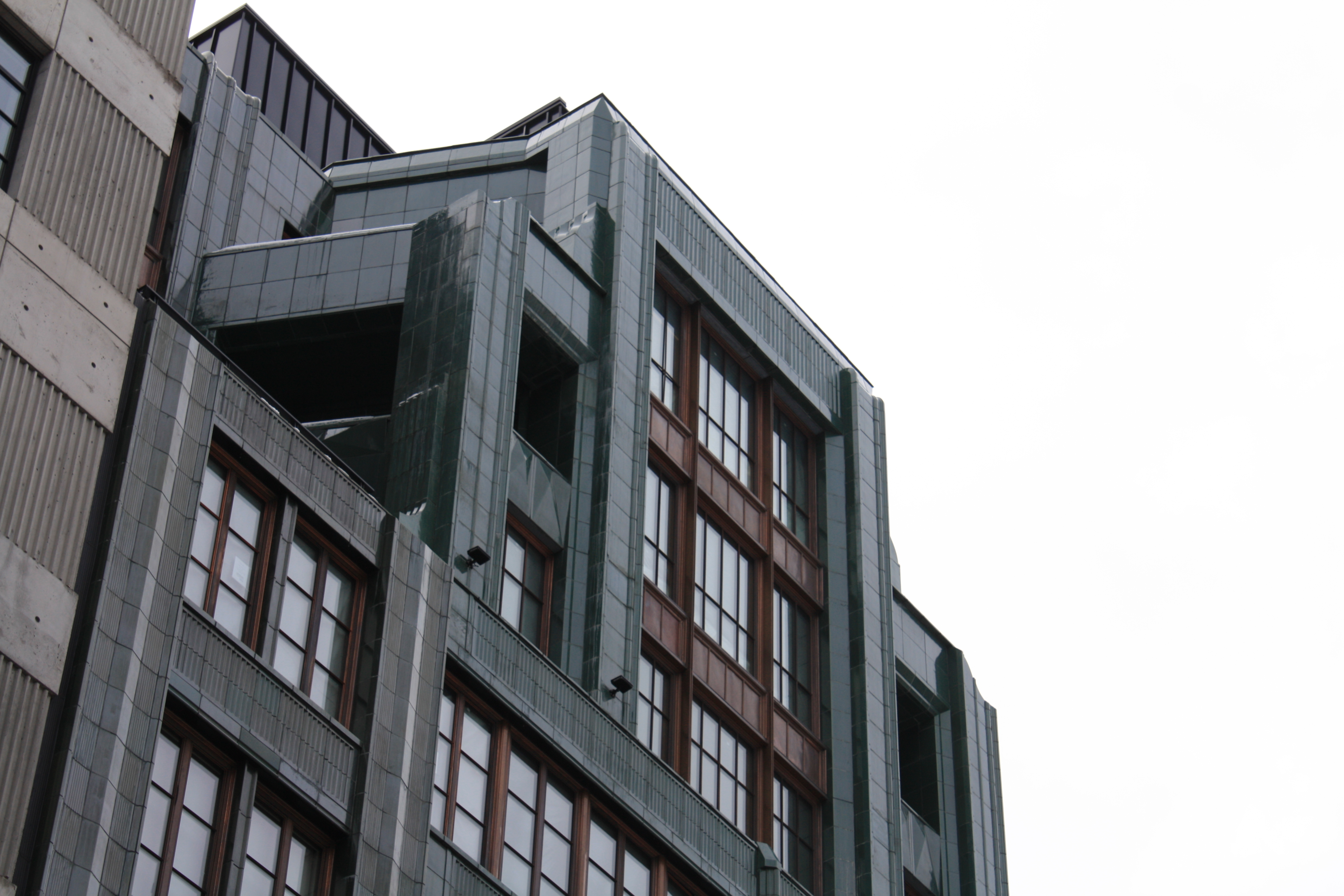
The building's crown
