= Fitzroy Football Club (disambiguation) =

The Fitzroy Football Club is an Australian rules football club based in the Melbourne suburb of Fitzroy.

Fitzroy Football Club may also refer to:

- Fitzroy Community Club, an Australian rules football club based in Adelaide
- Fitzroy Junior Football Club, a junior Australian rules football club
- Fitzroy Reds Amateur Football Club, a defunct Australian rules football club
- Fitzroy Stars Football Club, an Australian rules football club based in the Melbourne suburb of Thornbury
- Fitzroy SC, the name of various association football (soccer) clubs in Melbourne
