= Fitzroy River Barrage =

Fitzroy River Barrage may refer to:

- Fitzroy River Barrage (Queensland)
- Fitzroy River Barrage (Western Australia)

== See also ==
- Fitzroy River (disambiguation)
- Fitzroy (disambiguation)
