= Emily Mast =

American artist

Emily Mast (born 1976, Cleveland, Ohio) is a Los Angeles–based visual and performing artist. Her video and performance work has been exhibited internationally and was included in the Hammer Museum's "Made in LA" biennial in 2014. She has also performed live at LACMA, Human Resources, the Velaslavasay Panorama, Night Gallery, Public Fiction, and REDCAT. Many of Mast's pieces begin with an abstract text and she says of her work, "I'm someone who's always trying to squeeze things into their very essence." In 2013, she received a grant from the Harpo Foundation to develop a new series of performances. Mast was a contributor to the project Exhibition 211 in New York, 2009.
