= Fitzroy River =

Fitzroy River may refer to:

- Fitzroy River (Queensland), Australia
- Fitzroy River (Victoria), Australia
- Fitzroy River (Western Australia), Australia
- Fitzroy Channel, Chile

== See also ==
- Fitzroy River Barrage (disambiguation)
- Fitzroy (disambiguation)
