= Fitzroy SC =

Fitzroy SC may refer to:

- Fitzroy City SC, an Association football (soccer) club based in Richmond, Victoria, Australia
- Fitzroy District FC, a defunct Association football (soccer) club based in Fitzroy, Victoria, Australia
- Fitzroy SC (1966–1973), a defunct Association football (soccer) club based in Fitzroy, Victoria, Australia
- Heidelberg United FC, formerly 'Fitzroy United Alexander FC', an Association football (soccer) club based in Heidelberg West, Victoria, Australia
