= Fitzroy Hutton =

Royal Navy officer during World War II

Rear-Admiral Fitzroy Hutton CB
- Born: Fitzroy Evelyn Patrick Hutton; 1894
- Died: 1975 (aged 80–81)
- Military career
- Allegiance: United Kingdom
- Branch: Royal Navy
- Rank: Rear-Admiral
- Commands: HMS Penelope; HMS Hermes; HMS Warspite
- Conflicts: World War II

Fitzroy Evelyn Patrick Hutton (1894–1975) was a Royal Navy officer during World War II.

He commanded the light cruiser Penelope in 1936–1939, then commanded the aircraft carrier HMS Hermes (95) in 1939–1940 before becoming Chief of Staff for the Commander-in-Chief, China, in 1940–1941.

== Bibliography ==
- Halpern, Paul G., ed. (2016). The Mediterranean Fleet, 1930–1939. Publications of the Navy Records Society. Vol. 163. London: Routledge for the Navy Records Society. ISBN 978-1-4724-7597-8.
