= Fitzroy (1912) =

Australian steamship (1912–1921)

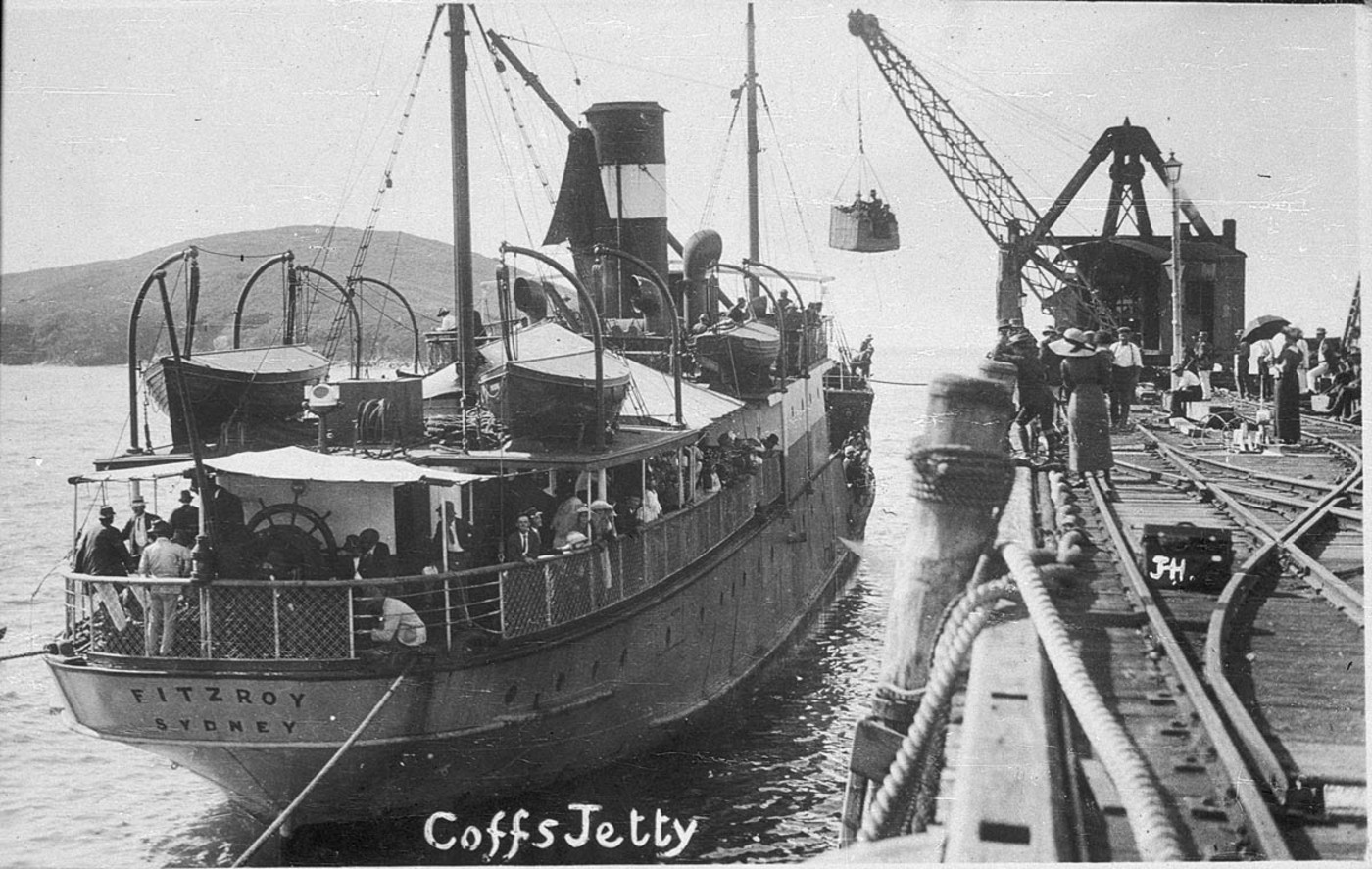
- Fitzroy being Loaded at Coffs Harbour

History
- Name: Fitzroy
- Owner: Langley Brothers
- Port of registry: Sydney
- Ordered: Designed by and ordered through James Pollock, London (Project No 438) in 1911
- Builder: Napier and Miller, Old Kilpatrick, Scotland
- Yard number: 184
- Launched: Saturday 30 March 1912
- Completed: 1912
- Identification: UK official number 131512; registration number 34/1912
- Fate: Wrecked 26 June 1921

General characteristics
- Type: Steamship
- Tonnage: 623 GRT; 282 NRT
- Length: 170 ft 2 in (51.87 m)
- Beam: 30 ft 7.5 in (9.33 m)
- Draught: 11 ft 4 in (3.45 m)
- Depth of hold: 10 ft 6.5 in (3.21 m)
- Decks: one and bridge
- Installed power: 72 NHP
- Propulsion: 3-cylinder triple-expansion steam engines; single screw
- Speed: 11 knots (20 km/h)
- Crew: 26

Fitzroy was a steel-hulled steamship built in 1912 at Old Kilpatrick, Scotland in 1912. Thirty-one people were killed when Fitzroy capsized in a gale whilst carrying a general cargo between Coffs Harbour and Sydney off Cape Hawke, New South Wales on 26 June 1921.

== Ship description and construction ==
=== Ship description ===
The vessel was a steel single deck and the bridge ship with two masts and an elliptical stern. Its dimensions were:

Length from foredeck of stem to stern post: 170 feet 2 inches (51.87 m)
Length at ¼ depth front top of weather deck at amidships to bottom of keel: 169 feet 4 inches (51.61 m)
Main breadth to outside plank: 30 feet 7.5 inches (9.33 m)
Depth of hold from tonnage deck to ceiling at amidships: 10 feet 6.5 inches (3.21 m)
Depth from top of beam amidships to top of keel: 11 feet 8 inches (3.56 m)
Depth from top of deck as side amidships to bottom of keel: 11 feet 4 inches (3.45 m)
Length of engine room: 36 feet 7 inches (11.15 m)

Displacement:

Total to ¼ the depth from weather deck at side amidships to bottom of keel 849 tons (649?)
Displacement per inch immersion at same depth 9 tons

The vessel had a 623.38 gross register tons (GRT) and a 281.57 net register tons (NRT) when first manufactured.

==== Propulsion ====
Fitzroy was powered by a single steel boiler producing 160 pounds per square inch (1,100 kPa) of steam with the pressure relief valves set to open 180 pounds per square inch (1,200 kPa).

This steam fed a triple-expansion steam engine built by Aitchison, Blair Ltd of Clydebank. It had cylinders of 14 inches (360 mm), 23 inches (580 mm) and 38 inches (970 mm) bore by 24 inches (610 mm) stroke, developed 72 NHP and gave the ship a speed of 11 knots (20 km/h).

== Ship service history ==
Fitzroy was mainly used by the shipping firm Langley Brothers as a passenger and general cargo vessel between Coffs Harbour and Sydney.

On 1 May 1913 the ship lost a passenger overboard:

on its voyage from Sydney, was six miles north of Seal Rocks, New South Wales, a passenger Thomas Brown, sprang overboard. The vessel was stopped, a buoy thrown, and a search made for an hour, but no sign could be seen of Brown. The passenger had behaved in a peculiar manner, and Captain Colvin locked him in a room When the captain was taking Brown's tea in, Brown rushed out and leaped overboard before he could be stopped.

== Captain James Colvin's service history ==
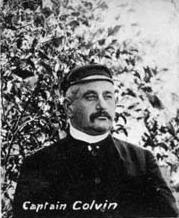
Captain James Colvin drowned with the sinking of the SS Fitzroy.

In July 1893 James Colvin was a crew member of the North Coast Steam Ship Company's City Of Grafton. He was charged with taking part in a strike as the whole of the crew had refused duty. He was remanded in jail till the hearing with then bail was allowed, themselves in £10 and surety of £10 each.

The strike also included the crews of the Wodonga, Barcoo, Wyrallah, Bega, and Burrawong.

By 1896 Colvin was in command of the 117-ton steamer Wollumbin which went ashore at Norah Head on 27 January 1896 while on a trip from Sydney to Newcastle.

William May who was in charge of the deck on the vessel at the time of her stranding was found to have committed a wrongful act in not taking soundings, or otherwise taking sufficient steps to keep the vessel away from the land.

In 1899 Colvin was the mate of the Orara when she was wrecked on the Tweed bar on 16 February 1899. The Orara was a wooden screw steamer of 181 tons registered in Sydney, and was owned by Mr G W Nicoll.

Colvin had made four trips in the ship to the Tweed River. He stated that the bar was at all times a dangerous bar to work. He had 10 years' experience in bar harbours, and he considered the Tweed bar the worst.

By 1901 Colvin was chief officer of the steamer Augusta and had rescued five different people from drowning. In one instance, in early April 1901, he plunged into Sydney Harbour and succeeded in keeping afloat a struggling man until further assistance arrived.

From February 1903 to December 1904, Colvin was in command of the Dorrigo doing the Coffs, Woolgoolga Sydney run.

In January 1905 Colvin was the first captain of the newly built 238-ton wooden screw steamer Cooloon, which plied between Woolgoolga Coffs Harbour and Sydney. He remained in charge of the vessel until at least August 1906.

In December 1908 it was found that he was associated with the "Page millions". The last Page who was the holder of the lands died without heirs in 1829. The bequest was made by the last owner, Harry Page, to Henry Young, who will probably be held to be entitled to the wealth lying in Chancery.

A granddaughter of Major-General Young was the late wife of Captain James Colvin, her maiden name being Lucy Goff. Captain Colvin trades between Sydney and Coffs Harbor, and he intends probing the matter further to show that his late wife and her children, and the four grandchildren of Major-General Young, now living at Bathurst, are the only direct representatives of Henry Young, to whom the Page millions were legally left.

Captain Colvin had no doubt that Major General Young was the son or the grandson of Henry Young, and he "had strong grounds for believing that this Henry Young was identical with the Henry Young who inherited from the last of the Pages."

He was in command of Fitzroy by 1913 and until her sinking in 1921 and his death.

== Shipwreck ==
During the night of Saturday 25 June 1921 and early on Sunday 26 June 1921 a storm raged on the mid-New South Wales Coast that was variously described as a gale or a cyclone.

On Sunday morning the Fitzroy foundered as did a little further south the steamer Our Jack.

Events reached Sydney by telegraph.

Inspector Mitchell inspector general of police tonight received the following message from the prison camp at Tuncurry Beach The steamer Fitzroy foundered south of Cape Hawke at half past 7o clock this morning There were on board 30 persons including passengers and crew Three men have been washed ashore. Henry Ramsay, Carl Jensen, and Peter Hansen The bodies of Roy Daley and George Carlsen have been washed up. Captain Colvin who is a native of Woolgoolga remained on the bridge to the last. Two lifeboats are still out. One containing seven or eight persons was capsized

The story of the wreck was outlined in the papers of the time:

The vessel left Coffs Harbour for Sydney on Saturday afternoon. When ploughing through heavy seas on Sunday morning the deck cargo of the Fitzroy shifted. A little later seas flooded the engine room and the vessel took a heavy list and capsized Four members of the crew and a passenger managed to reach a swamped lifeboat and after drifting all day were cast up on Tuncurry Beach Two were dead when the waves threw them up on shore A sixth man went down with ship but on reaching the surface made for the shore and he got there after being 12 hours in the water Captain Colvin was last seen standing on the bridge, and when she sank he was thrown into the water

Herbert H Ramsay, one of the survivors, when interviewed, said-“there was no panic, and a body of bluejackets could not been more orderly than the passenger and crew. Everybody remained cool to the last To launch the boats was almost impossible I cannot say how I went overboard but I know I went down with the ship When I came to the Surface I was near a waterlogged boat, and I managed to get to it. There were four members of the crew in it, and we landed at Prison Camp Two of the unfortunate men were unable to stand the strain of the surf and they died as we landed As I got into the boat I saw another boat with about eight persons in it I don t know who they were, but the boat was, in good condition and seemed to be dry My brother was a passenger, and I fear he has been lost. There was no time to get any lifesaving appliances ready Everyone tried help each other One of the sailors seeing the stewardess on deck, told her to get a lifebelt, but she replied that she wanted to get blankets for the passengers.

Further stories from the wreck included:

Roy Daly, aged 17 years, the steward, and George Carlsen, aged 21 years, seaman, members of the crew of the S.S. Fitzroy. Both men reached shore in a lifeboat but lost their lives in landing on Tuncurry beach.

Karl Jansen, able seaman on the Fitzroy, said that after the steamer left Coffs Harbour on Saturday night the wind was from the south-west. There was not much sea, until midnight. "I was called at half-past 6 a.m.," he said, "along with all hands to remove the deck cargo, which was endangering the ship. No steam could be got at the winch and the logs could not be moved. The captain gave instructions to don lifebelts but owing to the list of the vessel the boats could not be launched. There was about 9ft. of water in the stoke- hold and engine-room. The Fitzroy listed to port and sank. One boat broke away, but I do not know what became of the others. I was taken down with the ship On coming to the surface I saw a boat, which I swam to and managed to get in. Daly and Carlsen and another seaman and passenger were in the boat when I reached it. The chief engineer and the second officer were on the bottom of a boat near to me, and there were several people floating on wreckage. Our boat drifted to the beach and was overturned in the breakers, throwing us in the water. I reached the shore and saw Daly and Carlsen floating in the surf together. With Hansen, another A.B., I got them ashore but they were dead."

HMAS Marguerite, a mine sloop, was dispatched to look for survivors, and searched all day, but reported that she did not find anything. The Marguerite passed the bodies of cattle and pigs, which were all mutilated by sharks. Between Cape Hawke and Cloudy Heads there a large patch of water was coated with oil. Little wreckage was passed, and there was no sign of a lifeboat.

Olaf Johnannsen managed to swim ashore, a distance of 14 miles through the raging seas. He was in the water all day, and said:

I was on the bridge when the captain gave orders to get the boats out. There were two lady passengers on board and a stewardess. When the ship sank I had hold of the stewardess, but I lost her, as we were both carried down. When the Fitzroy sank she had turned and was heading for the beach, the captain intending to beach her.

— Olaf Johnannsen

== The Marine Court inquiry ==
Out of 35 persons on board at the time, 31 were drowned, including the master and all the officers.

The Court was informed that the Fitzroy left Coffs Harbor for Sydney on the afternoon of Saturday, 25 June. During the night the weather became bad and the vessel ran into a cyclonic storm. A large quantity of water came aboard at about half past 6 o'clock on Sunday morning, and thereupon the vessel took a list to port which gradually increased. Later water was found to be pouring in, apparently from an open ash shoot and from a porthole which had been smashed. Attempts were made to jettison the cargo but there was no steam available for the winches. The engineer announced that the position was hopeless. Boats were got in readiness for launching but, as it seemed that they would be overturned or smashed if launched, the captain thought it best to let them float off as the vessel sank. At about 8 o'clock the vessel capsized. Two of the boats with people in them floated off, but one immediately sank.

The Court found that everything possible was done to preserve the vessel and the lives of the passengers and crew. It could not discover from the evidence that there had been any misconduct or error of judgment on the part of the captain or officers. In the opinion of the Court the writer got into the stokehold but by what means excepting by stress of weather, it was unable to say.
