= Fitzroy SC (1966–1973) =

Fitzroy
- Full name: Fitzroy Soccer Club
- Nickname: Azzurri
- Founded: 1966; 60 years ago
- Dissolved: 1973; 53 years ago as 'Fawkner'
- League: Football Victoria State Leagues
Home colours

Fitzroy Soccer Club was an Australian association football (soccer) club based in the inner-northern Melbourne suburb of Fitzroy. The club was founded in 1966 by the local Italian community and competed in the modern day Victorian state league system. In its eighty-year existence the club achieved three league premierships, and was nicknamed the 'Azzurri' after the Italy national football team. In its last season in 1973, the club relocated to the outer northern suburb of Fawkner and was renamed as 'Fawkner Soccer Club' before dissolving at the season's conclusion, but had no connection to the present Fawkner Soccer Club.

== History ==
The club was initially known as 'Fitzroy', assumably being named after the relevant inner north-eastern suburb where many European immigrants settled in Melbourne following the second world war. Throughout its entire existence, the kit colours consisted of a blue jersey, white shorts, and blue socks. Whilst playing under the name of 'Fitzroy', the club's home matches were played on the soccer ovals of Royal Park in the nearby suburb of Parkville. In its final season in 1973, the club was renamed as 'Fawkner' but kept the 'Azzurri' nickname and relocated to CB Smith Reserve in Fawkner.

The club achieved three premierships throughout its eight-year existence. In the 1967 and 1972 seasons, the club were premiers of the modern day Victorian State League 4 being respectively known as the District League (northern conference) and Provisional League (division B) at the time. The club's highest league achievement was the District Premier League premiership in 1971, being of the modern day Victorian State League 3.

== Honours ==
- District Premier League (state sixth division)

Premiers (1): 1971

- District League - North/Provisional League Division - Division B (state seventh division)

Premiers (2): 1967, 1972
