= Charlotte Fitzroy =

Charlotte Fitzroy may refer to one of the following:

Two illegitimate daughters of Charles II of England:

- Charlotte Lee, Countess of Lichfield, daughter by Barbara Villiers
- Charlotte Jemima Henrietta Maria FitzRoy, daughter by Elizabeth Killigrew
- Charlotte FitzRoy, Countess of Euston (1761–1808), whose husband was descended from an illegitimate son of Charles II
