= Henry FitzRoy =

Henry FitzRoy may refer to:

- Henry FitzRoy (died 1157), illegitimate son of Henry I of England
- Henry FitzRoy, Duke of Richmond and Somerset (1519–1536), the only illegitimate child acknowledged by Henry VIII
- Henry FitzRoy, 1st Duke of Grafton (1663–1690), illegitimate son of Charles II of Great Britain
- Henry FitzRoy (cricketer) (1765–1794), English cricketer
- Henry FitzRoy, 5th Duke of Grafton (1790–1863), descendant of the 1st Duke of Grafton
- Henry FitzRoy (politician) (1807–1859), First Commissioner of Works during the mid-19th century
- Henry James FitzRoy, Earl of Euston (1848–1912), eldest son of Augustus FitzRoy, 7th Duke of Grafton
- Henry FitzRoy, 12th Duke of Grafton (born 1978), present Duke of Grafton
