= An Te Liu =

Exhibition view, Mono No Ma, Gardiner Museum, Toronto, 2013

An Te Liu is a Taiwanese-Canadian artist based in Toronto. Liu has become well known for his predominantly sculptural practice that involves a creative and insightful use of everyday found objects that are reconfigured into often playful yet critical commentaries on the ideals of modernism.

== Early life and education ==
Born in 1967 in Tainan, Taiwan, Liu emigrated to Canada with his parents at the age of four. He grew up in the town of Guelph, Ontario and attended Victoria College at the University of Toronto, where he received an Honors B.A. with a Specialist in Art History and Major in Renaissance Studies. Liu completed his M. Arch at the Southern California Institute of Architecture (SCI-Arc), Los Angeles in 1995, where he was awarded Outstanding Graduate Thesis.

== Art practice ==
Liu's work "takes as its starting point the history of twentieth-century architecture and its relationship to parallel or oblique modes of enquiry during the same era: the utopian social and theoretical goals of architecture; the relationship of cultural forms to the imagined environment and the organisation and housing of bodies; the history of the appliance and the product; the economies of obsolescence that undergird mass-production. Liu’s art reveals the staging of this longing, while foregrounding—through techniques of tessellation across forms and media—a possibility and reality of the failure of such projects".

Liu has had solo exhibitions nationally and internationally in a number of museums and galleries, including La Durée (Galerie Division, Montréal and Toronto), New Life (Fundación Marso, Mexico City), Transmission (Anat Ebgi Gallery, Los Angeles), The Knowing Nothing of the Thing (Art Labor, Shanghai; cat.), Naine Blanche (Musée d’art de Joliette), In Absentia (Southern Alberta Art Gallery), Mono No Ma (Gardiner Museum Toronto; cat.), Matter (Künstlerhaus Bethanien, Berlin; cat.), Tackiness and Anti-Power (Artists Space, New York), Ether (Mercer Union, Toronto), and Condition (Henry Urbach Architecture, New York).

Liu has participated in group exhibitions such as Nothing Stable Under Heaven (San Francisco Museum of Modern Art), Terminal P (La Panacée, Montpellier), Sticky Fingers (Arsenal Contemporary, New York), Der Brancusi Effekt (Kunsthalle Vienna; cat.), Museum for the End of the World (Nuit Blanche Toronto), Fremtidens arkitektur er grøn! (Louisiana Museum of Modern Art, Humlebæk; cat.), Hier ist Amerika oder Nirgends (Galerie Ben Kaufmann, Berlin; cat.), Street: behind the cliché (Witte de With Center for Contemporary Art, Rotterdam), Modelle für Morgen: Köln (European Kunsthalle, Cologne), Figuration in Contemporary Design (Art Institute of Chicago; cat.), Paradox Practice: Architecture in the Wake of Conceptualism (UCI Art Gallery, Irvine cat.), Sense of the City (Centre Canadien d’Architecture/CCA, Montréal; cat.), mosiaCanada: Sign and Sound (Seoul Museum of Art; cat.), Domestic Odyssey (San Jose Museum of Art; cat.), Therefore Beautiful (Ursula Blickle Stiftung, Kraichtal; cat.), New Reduction as Expansion (Galerie Fotohof, Salzburg) and New Modulr (Blackwood Gallery, Toronto).

Liu’s work has also been featured in several international biennial exhibitions such as the 2017 Chicago Architecture Biennial Make New History, the 2014 Canadian Biennial of the National Gallery of Canada Shine a light, the 2009 EVA International Ireland Biennial Reading the City, and the 11th Venice Biennale of Architecture Out There: Architecture Beyond Building. For the latter, Liu created his installation, Cloud, which was subsequently acquired by SFMOMA.

For 2007-2008, Liu was awarded the International Artist Residency of the Künstlerhaus Bethanien, Berlin by the Canada Council for the Arts. Among other honors, he received the Emerging Voices Award from the Architectural League of New York (2007) and was Finalist for the Sovereign Asian Art Prize (2015). Liu has won first prize in several public art competitions, including the SWN Neuss competition, Düsseldorf (2009), the Concord Park competition, North York (2016), and the Park Hyatt competition, Toronto (2019).

Liu has been the recipient of several peer-awarded individual research and creation grants, including those given by the Graham Foundation for Advanced Studies in the Fine Arts (2002-3), the Canada Council for the Arts (2003-4, 2006-7, and 2011–12), the Ontario Arts Council (2004, 2007, 2011, and 2015), the Toronto Arts Council (2003-4, 2006-7, and 2015), and the Connaught Fund (2002-2003).

As an artist and academic, Liu has been an invited speaker and symposium participant at various venues including the Whitney Museum of American Art, Power Plant Centre for Contemporary Art, Witte de With Center for Contemporary Art, Architectural League of New York, Université de Paris I-Panthéon Sorbonne, BASE Beijing, Yale University School of Architecture, California College of the Arts, Verein zur Förderung von Kunst und Kultur Berlin, MOCA Toronto, University of Illinois, USC School of Architecture, McGill University, National Gallery of Canada, Kitchener-Waterloo Art Gallery, and most recently, SMU Meadows School of the Arts.

In 2017, Liu held his first solo exhibition at Anat Ebgi Gallery ANAT EBGI GALLERY in Los Angeles, "Transmission". The show was featured in The Los Angeles Times Review: From packaging material to modern totem: The wry art of An Te Liu, Art Review An Te Liu: Transmissions, reviewed by Andrew Berardini, and Artforum An Te Liu.

In 2020, An Te Liu and Alejandro Cardenas exhibited a two person show at Anat Ebgi Gallery Alejandro Cardenas & An Te Liu.

In 2022, Liu was featured in his second LA solo exhibition, "Low Fidelity" An Te Liu: Low Fidelity at Anat Ebgi Gallery ANAT EBGI GALLERY. The show was featured in Visual Art Source Visual Art Source.

== Works ==
Eidolon series of bronze sculptures (2016). As an idol or apparition in ancient Greek literature, the Eidolon is a phantom double, an elusive entity. This series is a family of seven figures conjured from found materials. Each of them is Janus-like, with two faces - one looking to the past and the other to the future. Assimilating and expressing multiple identities, they may resemble toy robots, early arcade game characters, or archaic Polynesian sculpture. They seem like something already known.

The Tropos series (2016) embodies tributes to four female figures from the modern age: Gertrude Stein, Djuna Barnes, Elsa von Freytag-Loringhoven and Mina Loy. Each was renowned for their advanced attitudes and avant-garde postures. Stein, artistically, was known for working with a self-limited range of words that were repeated and manipulated in order to stretch out the possible number of meanings and associations. Barnes was also a modernist American writer and prominent bohemian; Freytag-Loringhoven was a German-born Dadaist poet, artist and provocateuse; and Loy was a British futurist artist and writer. In each Tropos ( a Greek term for “turn” and indicating change) the repetition, twisting, and mirroring of the same elements speaks to the playful and experimental approach to art adopted by these four figures, and also to their vivid personalities. (excerpt from Shannon Anderson, An Te Liu: Tradition and the Historical Sense)

White Dwarf, 2012

The 2013 exhibition Mono No Ma at the Gardiner Museum, Toronto comprises numerous ceramic works that specifically explore the space around things. Drawn at first to the burnished surfaces and anthropomorphic features of funerary ware in the Gardiner’s Ancient Americas collection, Liu has transformed discarded styrofoam packing from consumer goods into ceramic sculptures that evoke a multiplicity of references. Using remnants of the contemporary world, he conjures forms recalling iconic works of both the ancient and modern periods. While each sculpture bears the imprint of an object in use today, the ambiguity of their origin invites reflection upon our relationship to things, both utilitarian and artistic, old and new. As such, the works stand like fossils of an evolving, unconscious present.

Title Deed, 2009

White Dwarf (2012) is named after a dead star, one that has burned out and contracted into a dense, faintly emitting mass. It is a collage of many items associated with nostalgic feelings, such as the first Playstation, a 56k fax modem, and a VHS tape rewinder. Liu states that this assemblage of obsolete objects is meant to portray the life-cycle of everyday objects, ones that have outlived their comfort and convenience they once possessed.

Title Deed (2009). As part of the Leona Drive group exhibition in Toronto, Liu refashioned a vacant suburban tract house as a life-sized Monopoly piece. Liu uses the artistic strategy of 'change in scale' to restore an ordinary house to its status as an icon of 20th century suburban development. Title Deed is a site-specific artwork. In an interview with Canadian Art editor Richard Rhodes, Liu states that he was first commissioned to do this project "at the height of the subprime mortgage crisis". He notes that the suburban tract house reduced to its iconic form, provides a frame of reference for understanding the financial crisis as an event caused by the trading of mortgages as if they were pieces in a Monopoly game. Title Deed relates to, Pattern Language (1999) an earlier work by Liu. Pattern Language creates wallpaper from aerial photographs of Levittown the "first truly mass-produced suburb" in North America. By using the tract house as a basic compositional unit for a wallpaper pattern, Liu ironically renders the modular design aspirations of the suburbs as mere decor.

Cloud (2008) Shown at the 11th Venice Biennial of Architecture in 2008 Cloud is an assemblage of 136 domestic use air purifiers, ionizers and dehumidifiers hung in formation above the viewer's head. When multiplied, the functional purpose of these objects is obscured and new metaphorical readings become apparent. Liu combines "formal ingenuity with conceptual clarity" to show that the preference in 20th century industrial design for clean, functional lines was influenced by the wider concerns of modernism. Implicit to this work is the Modernist rejection of decorative embellishment and a related concern for the "modern" values of purity and hygiene.

Liu's work is included in the permanent collections of the San Francisco Museum of Modern Art the Art Institute of Chicago and the Art Gallery of Ontario. In 2008, he was the Canada Council for the Arts' Artist in Residence at the Künstlerhaus Bethanien in Berlin, and published the catalogue An Te Liu: Matter.

== Exhibitions ==
=== Solo exhibitions ===
- 2023 Signal to Noise, Blouin Division, Toronto
- 2019 La Durée, Galerie Division, Montréal
- 2018 La Durée, Division Gallery, Toronto
- 2018 New Life, Fundación Marso, Mexico City
- 2017 Transmission, Anat Ebgi Gallery, Los Angeles
- 2016 An Te Liu, Volta, New York
- 2016 Naine Blanche, Musée d’art de Joliette, Joliette
- 2016 Solid States, Museum of Contemporary Canadian Art (MOCA) at the Toronto Sculpture Garden
- 2015 Des bribes et des morceaux, Galerie Division, Montréal
- 2015 An Te Liu, Division Gallery, Toronto
- 2015 In Absentia, Southern Alberta Art Gallery, Lethbridge
- 2015 In Absentia, Kitchener-Waterloo Art Gallery
- 2015 In Absentia, Art Gallery of Grande Prairie
- 2014 The Knowing Nothing of the Thing, Art Labor Gallery, Shanghai, China
- 2013 Mono No Ma, Gardiner Museum, Toronto
- 2013 Recodings, Bulthaup, Toronto
- 2012 Blast, Allen Lambert Galleria, Brookfield Place, Toronto
- 2012 Lost in Transaction, No. 9 Contemporary Art, Pearson International Airport Toronto
- 2011 Blast, Michael Klein Gallery (MKG127), Toronto
- 2009 Pook X Pookie, SCI-Arc Gallery, Los Angeles
- 2008 Matter, Künstlerhaus Bethanien, Berlin (cat.)
- 2008 Style and Epoch, Michael Klein Gallery (MKG127), Toronto
- 2007 Ether, The News at Five, Toronto International Art Fair
- 2004 Ether, Mercer Union, Toronto
- 2004 Tackiness and Anti-Power, Artists Space, New York
- 2001 Condition, Henry Urbach Architecture, New York
- 2000 Pathology, Contemporary Art Gallery (CAG), Vancouver

== Publications ==
=== Monographs and catalogues of solo exhibitions ===
- Larois, Pablo; Lum, Ken; Scott, Kitty; Berardini, Andrew (2015). An Te Liu. London: Black Dog Publishing. ISBN 978-1-910433-38-6.
- Ho, Daniel (2014). An Te Liu - The Knowing Nothing of the Thing. Shanghai: Art Labor.
- Prokapow, Michael John (2013). An Te Liu: Mono No Ma. Toronto: George R. Gardiner Museum. ISBN 978-0978499976.
- Mania, Astrid; Müller, Vanessa Joan; Schafhausen, Nicolaus (2008). An Te Liu: Matter. Berlin: Künstlerhaus Bethanien. ISBN 978-3-932754-97-5.
