= Charles FitzRoy =

Charles FitzRoy may refer to:

- Charles FitzRoy, 2nd Duke of Cleveland (1662–1730), 18th century nobleman
- Charles FitzRoy, 2nd Duke of Grafton (1683–1757), nobleman who was Lord Lieutenant of Ireland
- Lord Charles FitzRoy (1718–1739), fourth son of Charles FitzRoy, 2nd Duke of Grafton
- Charles FitzRoy, 1st Baron Southampton (1737–1797), British statesman and soldier, MP for Bury St. Edmunds
- Charles FitzRoy (British Army officer, born 1762) (1762–1831), son of Charles FitzRoy, 1st Baron Southampton
- Lord Charles FitzRoy (British Army officer, born 1764), second son of Augustus FitzRoy, 3rd Duke of Grafton, general and MP for Bury St. Edmunds
- Lord Charles FitzRoy (British Army officer, born 1791), second son of George FitzRoy, 4th Duke of Grafton, British Army officer and MP for Bury St. Edmunds
- Sir Charles Augustus FitzRoy (1796–1858), governor of Prince Edward Island and New South Wales
- Lord Charles Edward FitzRoy (1857–1911), third son of Augustus FitzRoy, 7th Duke of Grafton
- Charles FitzRoy, 10th Duke of Grafton (1892–1970), soldier and farmer
- Lord Charles Oliver Edward FitzRoy (1923–1944), second son of Charles FitzRoy, 10th Duke of Grafton, soldier
- Lord Charles Patrick Hugh FitzRoy (born 1957), second son of Hugh FitzRoy, 11th Duke of Grafton, author
- Charles FitzRoy, 3rd Baron Southampton (1804–1872), British peer
