= John FitzRoy =

John FitzRoy may refer to:

- Lord John FitzRoy (1785–1856), British MP
- John FitzRoy, 9th Duke of Grafton (1914–1936), English peer, kinsman of the above
- Maurice FitzRoy (John Maurice Fitzroy, 1897–1976), English cricketer
