= General FitzRoy =

General FitzRoy may refer to:

- Charles FitzRoy (British Army officer, born 1762) (1762–1831), British Army general
- Lord Charles FitzRoy (British Army officer, born 1764) (1764–1829), British Army general
- William FitzRoy (British Army Officer) (1830–1902), British Army major general
- George FitzRoy, Duke of Northumberland (1665–1716), British Army lieutenant general
