= Fitzroy Place (Colorado) =

Historic building in Colorado

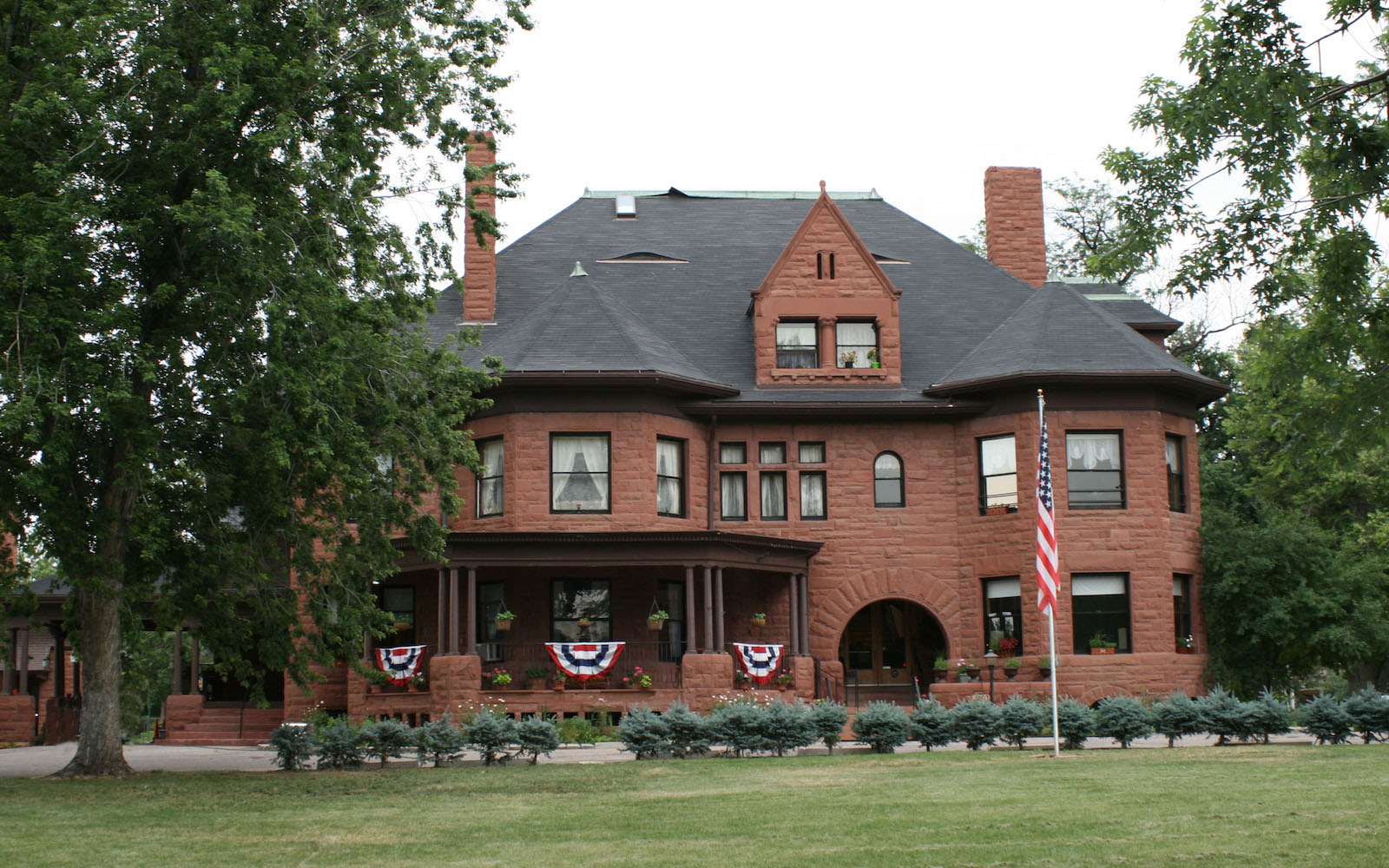

General information
- Status: Completed
- Architectural style: Richardsonian Romanesque
- Location: 2160 S Cook St; Denver, Colorado
- Current tenants: Accelerated Schools
- Construction started: 1891
- Completed: 1893
- Cost: US$65.000 (US$2.33 million in 2025 dollars)
- Client: Elizabeth Iliff Warren
- Owner: Accelerated Schools

Technical details
- Material: Red Stone
- Size: 19,000+ square ft
- Floor count: 3
- Lifts/elevators: 1 (no longer in the building)

Design and construction
- Architects: Fuller and Wheeler

Other information
- Number of rooms: 120
- Parking: Parking Lot, Street

- Warren/Iliff Mansion
- U.S. National Register of Historic Places
- U.S. National Historic Landmark
- NRHP reference No.: 75000508

Significant dates
- Added to NRHP: February 20, 1975
- Designated NHL: September 12, 1974

The Fitzroy Place is a historic home in Denver, Colorado. Completed in 1893, it was designed by Fuller and Wheeler, New York architects, and was built in the Richardsonian Romanesque style that was extremely popular on the American West Coast. The architects were noted for the numerous educational buildings they designed in the United States and overseas. Elizabeth Iliff Warren, widow of John Wesley Iliff, a successful cattle baron and Denver philanthropist, commissioned the mansion. John Wesley died in 1878 of gall bladder obstruction, leaving Elizabeth, at 34, with four children, cattle, and a land empire. The Fitzroy Mansion was named on the National Register of Historic Places in 1975 and designated a Denver Historic Landmark in 2008.

== Name origin ==
The Warren-Iliff Mansion, more commonly known as The Fitzroy Place, was named after the Elizabeth's birthplace in Ontario, Canada.

== History ==
When Iliff Hall was started, construction had begun on a stone residence for the Warrens on South Cook Street. They had engaged the services of Fuller Wheeler, architects of Albany, New York. Though the plans for Iliff Hall have been lost, one would expect to have both buildings made with Lyons red sandstone and simultaneously designed by the same architects. They were, for William S. Iliff paid Fuller and Wheeler $1,750 for the architectural designs on June 10, 1892. For many years, it was believed that the architect had been Frank E. Edbrooke of Denver because it was known that he had designed many Denver homes of the period.

Fuller and Wheeler had offered to build the structure for "not less than $50,000," and by January 25, 1893, the total cost was $62,250.

== Building statistics ==
Behind the over one hundred different doors of the property, separating between three different buildings, is sixteen basement doors, twenty-eight first-floor doors, eighteen-second floor doors, twenty-one third-floor doors, and one fourth-floor door.
