= Augustin Maurs =

French musician and composer

Augustin Maurs is a French musician and composer. After completing his music education at the Hanns Eisler Music Academy in Berlin, he was a scholarship holder at the International Music Institute Darmstadt (IMD) and a guest of the Ensemble Modern Akademie. He lives in Berlin.

== Music ==
Focussing on the interpretation and the contextualisation of music, Augustin Maurs explores different forms of music making and musical practices as such. He subsequently does not compose music in a typical sense, but he works through oral agreements, with chosen sites, found documents and other visual associations - an array of interactive movements that he describes with the term “musicality”.

In recent years he also became active in the realm of visual arts, sometimes extending his musical practice to curatorial projects and collaborations with artists, like among others Saâdane Afif, Annika Larsson, Anri Sala, Tracey Rose, Angela Bulloch or Tino Sehgal.

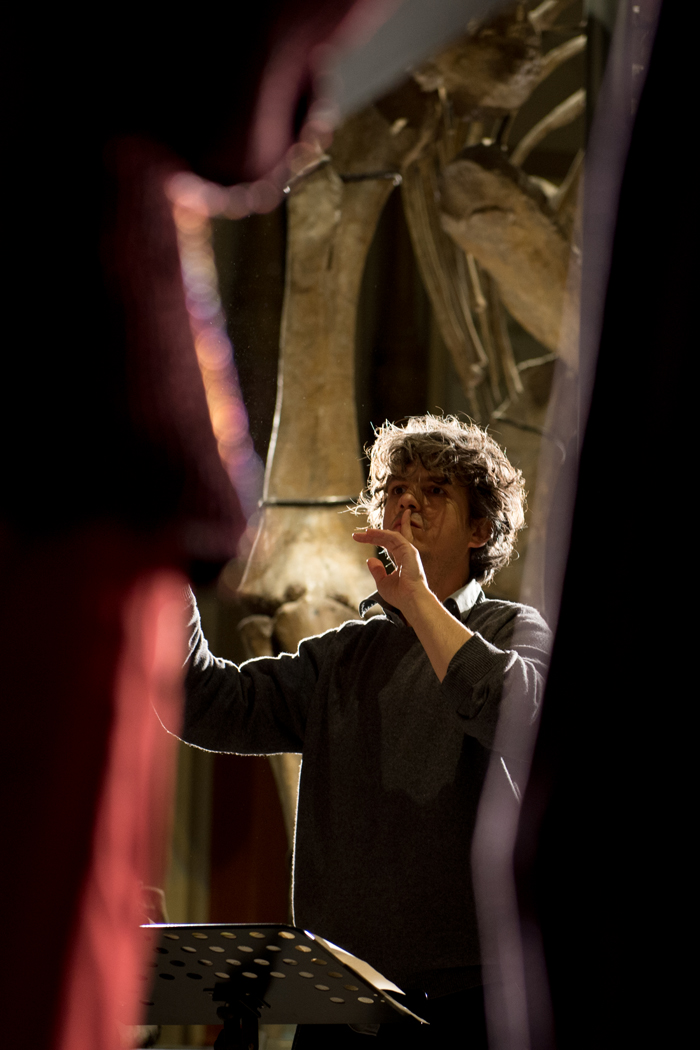
Augustin Maurs, Museum of Natural History, Berlin 2015

His projects have been presented at among others the Berlin Philharmonie, the Auditorium Parco della Musica in Rome, the New York Goethe Institute, the Schinkel Pavillon in Berlin, the Dilijan Arts Observatory in Armenia, the Hamburger Bahnhof Museum Berlin, the Beishan Broadcast Wall in Taiwan, the Geneva art fair, the Berlin Academy of Arts or the Busan Biennale 2018.

The musicologist Christian Baier wrote about his work: "Augustin Maurs has gone to a no man's land of the undefined, close to the intersection of art and existence.”

== Selected projects ==
2018 I Have No Words, for voices and propaganda loudspeakers, Beishan Broadcast Wall, Kinmen Island, Taiwan and Busan Biennale 2018

2018 Musiques pour Tuyauteries, commissioned by Saâdane Afif, for bird-bone flutes especially designed on the occasion of Saâdane Afif’s exhibition “Musiques pour Tuyauteries”, Mor Charpentier Gallery / Silencio, Paris

2018 The Dilijan Transcriptions, Hamburger Bahnhof, Berlin

2017 Myth, Music and Electricity, Herkulessaal, Munich, with Monica Bonvicini, Angela Bulloch Nina Canell & Robin Watkins, Annika Larsson, Susan Philips and Karin Sander.

2017 Die Blaue Stunde, with Angela Bulloch, artgenève 2017

2016 7 Ideas of Stolen Time, Schinkel Pavillon Berlin

2016 Water Music (Again), Monaco Nuit Blanche

2015 Das Ende der Welt – for vocal ensemble and percussion, commissioned by Saâdane Afif on the occasion of his exhibition “Das Ende der Welt”, Museum für Naturkunde, Berlin

2014 Found Melodies and Stains, Geneva Art Fair

2014 Canon - for loudspeakers, Villa Massimo, Rome

2013 Sept Notes sur le travail de Peter Roehr, commissioned by Saâdane Afif, on the occasion of his exhibition “Sept Notes sur le travail de Peter Roehr” Mehdi Schouakri Gallery, Berlin

2013 Bach Practice Files, New York Goethe Institute

2013 Virtuosity – on skill and disruption, strength and nonchalance, morale and cheating, with the Kammerensemble Neue Musik Berlin and artists Saâdane Afif, Bethan Huws, Christoph Keller, Annika Larsson, Klara Lidén, Olaf Nicolai, Elliott Sharp, Tracey Rose and Tino Sehgal. Berlin Philharmonie

2012 Speak Museum, Musée du Château des ducs de Wurtemberg, Montbéliard (France)

2012 Alphorn Walk, Festival Pièces d'Été, Malbuisson, (France)

2011 The Story of the Wolf Tone - for cello and a wolf, with Ana Teixeira Pinto, Salon Populaire, Berlin

2011 Allemande - reiterations on an empty stage, Sophiensaele, Berlin

2011 Concerto for Cello, Gong Ensemble, Orations and Table Ceremony, with the ensemble “The Tenth Assault on Kazan”, St. Elisabeth-Church, Berlin

2010 Symphony - concert-essay with Wolfgang Amadeus Mozart, Nam June Paik, Georges de Scudéry, Gustav Mahler, Annika Larsson, Coma Gallery, Berlin

2010 Attempt of a dialog, Hoffmann Collection, Berlin

2010 Winterreisen - a commentary on Schubert's “Winter Journey”, St. Elisabeth-Church, Berlin, Hebbel am Ufer theatre

2010 Music for Drunk Audience, Cello, Piano and Acoustical Handicaps, Coma Gallery, Berlin
