= HMS Fitzroy =

HMS Fitzroy has been the name of more than one British ship of the Royal Navy, and may refer to:

- HMS Fitzroy (J03), a Hunt-class minesweeper completed as a survey ship, later minesweeper, launched in 1919 and sunk in 1942
- HMS Fitzroy (K553), a Captain-class frigate, originally a US warship, in commission with the RN from 1943 to 1945
