= Isabella FitzRoy =

Isabella FitzRoy may refer to:

- Isabella FitzRoy, Duchess of Grafton (née Bennet, 1668–1723), mother of Charles FitzRoy, 2nd Duke of Grafton
- Isabella Seymour-Conway, Countess of Hertford (née FitzRoy), daughter of Charles FitzRoy, 2nd Duke of Grafton

== See also ==
- Izo FitzRoy (Isobel FitzRoy, born 1985), English musician
