= Robert O'Brien FitzRoy =

Royal Navy officer

Vice-Admiral Sir Robert O'Brien FitzRoy KCB
- Born: 2 April 1839
- Died: 7 May 1896 (aged 57)
- Military career
- Allegiance: United Kingdom
- Branch: Royal Navy
- Service years: 1853–1896
- Rank: Vice-admiral
- Commands: HMS Alexandra; Channel Squadron
- Conflicts: Second Opium War
- Awards: Knight Commander of the Order of the Bath

Vice-Admiral Sir Robert O'Brien FitzRoy KCB (2 April 1839 – 7 May 1896) was a Royal Navy officer who served as Commander-in-Chief, Channel Squadron.

== Naval career ==
Born the son of Admiral Robert FitzRoy, FitzRoy Junior joined the Royal Navy in 1853. He served in the Second Opium War in 1857 and was promoted to captain in 1872. In 1878 he commanded HMS Alexandra, flagship of Admiral Sir Geoffrey Hornby through the Dardanelles to Constantinople and although he grounded the ship, it was later re-floated. On 16 April 1886 he was made a Naval Aide-de-Camp to the Queen.

He served as Commander-in-Chief, Channel Squadron from 1894 to 1895 and was appointed KCB shortly before his death in 1896.

Military offices
Preceded by Sir Henry Fairfax	Commander-in-Chief, Channel Fleet; 1894–1895	Succeeded by Lord Walter Kerr
