= Stephen Heath =

English cricketer

Personal information
- Full name: Stephen David Heath
- Born: 7 July 1967 (age 59); Bristol, England
- Batting: Right-handed
- Bowling: Leg break

Domestic team information
- Years: Team
- 1986–1988: Cambridge University

Career statistics
Competition	First-class
Matches	10
Runs scored	170
Batting average	11.33
100s/50s	–/–
Top score	33*
Balls bowled	42
Wickets	0
Bowling average	–
5 wickets in innings	–
10 wickets in match	–
Best bowling	–
Catches/stumpings	2/–
- Source: Cricinfo, 12 January 2022

Stephen David Heath (born 7 July 1967) is an English former first-class cricketer.

Heath was born at Bristol in July 1967. He was educated at King Edward's School in Birmingham, before going up to Trinity College, Cambridge. While studying at Cambridge, he played first-class cricket for Cambridge University Cricket Club from 1986 to 1988, making ten appearances. Playing as a middle order batsman in the Cambridge side, Heath scored 170 runs at an average of 11.33, with his highest score being 33 not out.
