= Elena Bajo =

Spanish painter

Elena Bajo is a visual artist, born in Spain, who currently works out of Los Angeles, California, USA.

== Biography ==
Bajo received a Master of Arts in architecture in 2002 from the Escola de Architectura in Barcelona Spain. She then received a Master of Fine Arts from Central Saint Martins School of Art in London. She lives and works in Los Angeles, CA United States and Berlin, Germany

== Career ==
Bajo's work bridges a variety of media including installation, sculpture, painting, performance, participatory events, film and text.

== Works ==
=== Individual shows ===
- 2016 Throwing Car Parts from a Cliff before Sunrise - Garcia Galeria, Madrid (Spain)
- 2015 Isle of Innocence" After Fordlandia Kunsthalle São Paulo, Brazil
- 2014 With Entheogenic Intent (Burn the Witch)18th Street Arts Center, Los Angeles, California USA
- 2007 The Garden of Dreams – Museum of the City Galway Ireland
