= 211 Elizabeth =

Residential building in Manhattan, New York

Coordinates: 40°43′20″N 73°59′40″W

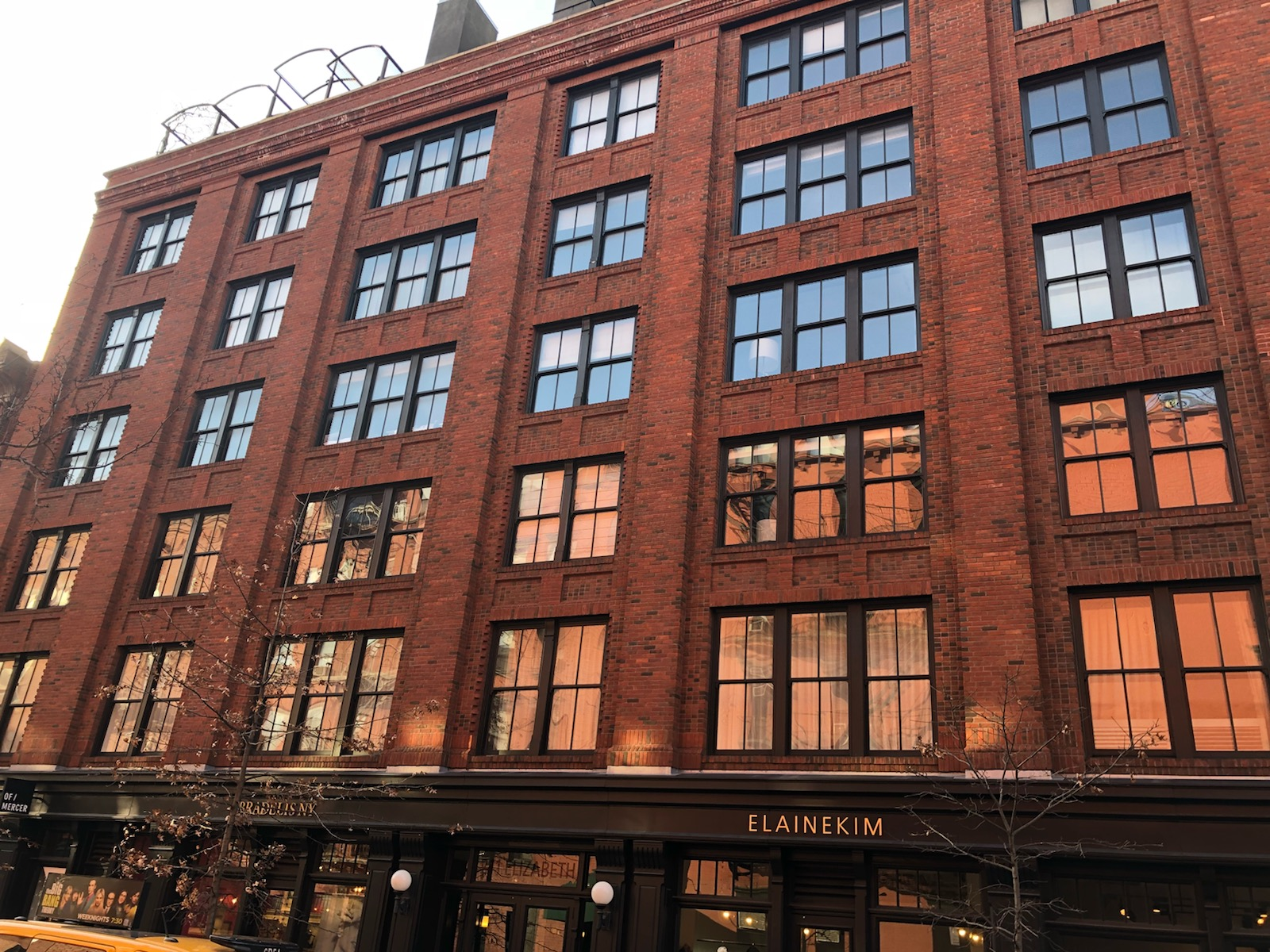
- Interactive map of the 211 Elizabeth area

General information
- Status: Completed
- Type: Mixed use
- Location: 211 Elizabeth
- Completed: 2009

Technical details
- Floor count: 7

Design and construction
- Architect: Roman and Williams

211 Elizabeth is a residential building at 211 Elizabeth Street in the Nolita neighborhood of Manhattan in New York City. It was designed by architecture and interior design firm Roman and Williams and was the organization's first full building design. The building is primarily residential, but also includes space for three separate commercial developments on the first floor. It has fifteen units spread across seven stories, and room for three separate commercial developments in the structure's basement. Billy Joel and Gabriel Byrne are both residents of the building, as were Karlie Kloss and Josh Kushner until 2019.

The bricks of the building were placed by hand, which is atypical for contemporary construction, as most buildings use pre-fabricated brick facades. Construction was led by Irish masons, and individual bricks cost up to $300 apiece.

The building sold out in 2010, after failing to sell out when first placed on the market in 2008 due to the recession, a fact that resulted in the brief withdrawal of listings in the buildings. Tenants received a custom bike upon purchasing a residence. The building won a Palladio Award in 2010 for its use of traditional design and construction materials.
