= Matilda FitzRoy =

Matilda or Maud FitzRoy may refer to:

- Matilda FitzRoy, Duchess of Brittany, illegitimate daughter of Henry I of England by unnamed mistress
- Matilda FitzRoy, Countess of Perche, illegitimate daughter of Henry I of England by Edith
- Matilda FitzRoy, Abbess of Montivilliers, illegitimate daughter of Henry I of England by Isabel de Beaumont
- Constance/Maud FitzRoy, Viscountess de Beaumont, illegitimate daughter of Henry I of England by unnamed mistress
