= William Wescomb =

The Reverend William Wescomb (1788 – 25 May 1832) was an Anglican clergyman who owned Thrumpton Hall in Nottinghamshire.

== Early life ==
Wescomb was born at Langford Grove in 1788 and baptised on 6 June 1788 at St. Giles Church, Langford. He was the son of Nicholas Wescomb (1732–1808) and Lucy (née Marshall) Wescomb (1744–1835). His elder brother was John Emerton Wescomb.

His paternal grandparents were William Wescomb and Elizabeth (née Wotton) Wescomb. His maternal grandparents were William Marshall and Anne (née Gatwood) Marshall.

== Career ==
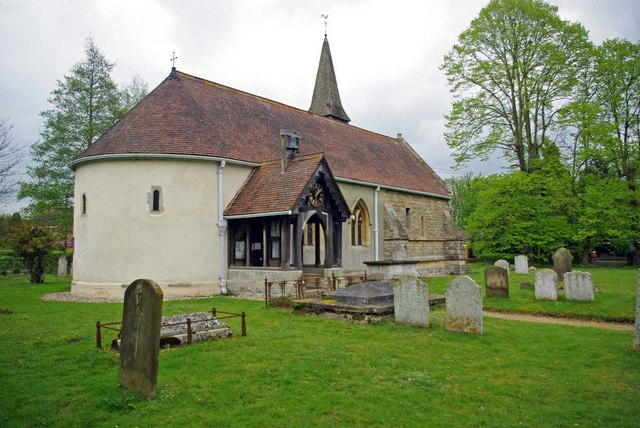
St. Giles Church, Langford, Essex

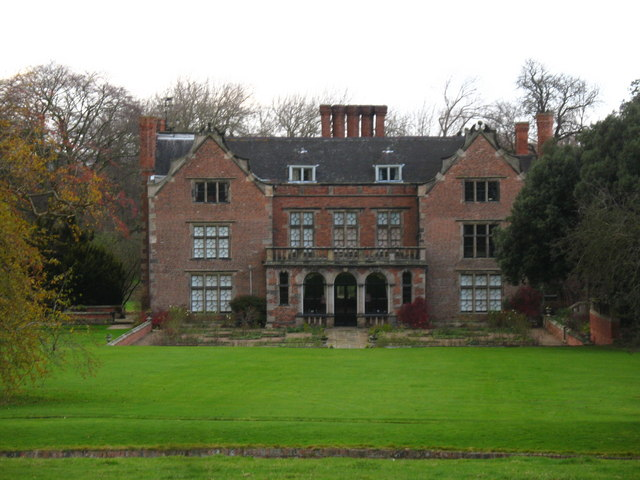
Thrumpton Hall

He was the Rector at Langford, Essex.

Upon the death of his unmarried brother, John Emerton Wescomb, in 1838, he inherited Thrumpton Hall in Nottinghamshire.

== Personal life ==
On 6 February 1816 at St George's, Hanover Square, Wescomb was married to Jane Douglas (c. 1790–1868), a daughter of William Douglas, a Judge at India. Her paternal grandfather was Archibald Douglas, MP for Dumfries Burghs and Dumfriesshire. Together, they lived at Thrumpton Hall, Nottinghamshire, and were the parents of:

- Lucy Elizabeth Jane Wescomb (1822–1912), who married George Byron, 8th Baron Byron, a son of George Byron, 7th Baron Byron and Elizabeth Mary Chandos-Pole (the daughter of Sacheverell Pole, of Radbourne Hall), in 1843. After his death in 1870, she married her cousin, the Rev. Philip Henry Douglas (a grandson of the Rev. Philip Douglas) in 1878. Douglas was the Vicar at Thrumpton in 1873.
- John William Wescomb (1824–1825), who died young.
- Mary Jane Wescomb (1826–1909), who married Hon. Frederick Byron, also a son of George Byron, 7th Baron Byron and Elizabeth Mary Chandos-Pole, in 1851.
- Catherine Sarah Wilhelmina Wescomb (1829–1914), who married Lord Frederick FitzRoy, MP for Thetford who was a son of Henry FitzRoy, 5th Duke of Grafton and Mary Caroline Berkeley (a daughter of Adm. Hon. Sir George Cranfield Berkeley).

The Rev. Wescomb died on 25 May 1832 at Langford, Maldon District, Essex, and was buried at St. Giles Churchyard there.

=== Descendants ===
Through his daughter Mary Jane, he was a grandfather of Hon. Eva Lucy Mary Byron (who married Col. Henry Robert Eyre of Middleton Lodge), George Byron, 9th Baron Byron (who married Fanny Lucy Radmall Brinckman), and the Rev. Frederick Byron, 10th Baron Byron (who married Lady Anna Ismay Ethel FitzRoy, a granddaughter of the 7th Duke of Grafton).
