= Philip Douglas =

British priest and academic (1758–1822)

The Reverend Philip Douglas D.D.
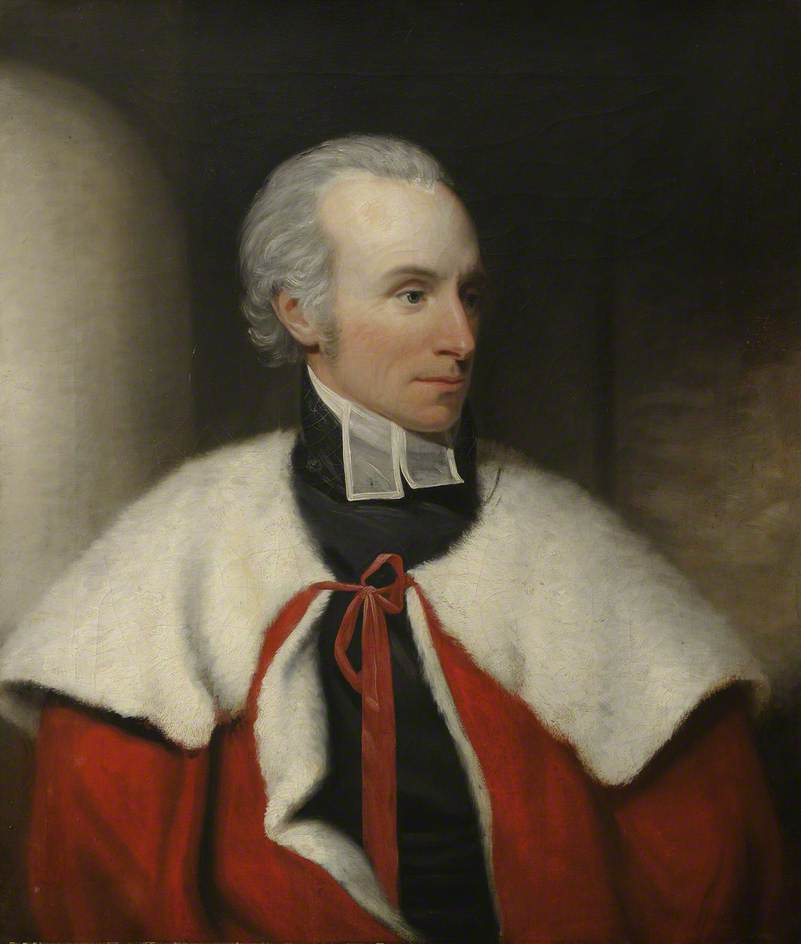

Vice-Chancellor of the University of Cambridge
- In office 1810–1811
- Preceded by: Isaac Milner
- Succeeded by: Thomas Browne
- In office 1795–1796
- Preceded by: Lowther Yates
- Succeeded by: Richard Belward

Personal details
- Born: 27 October 1758
- Died: 2 January 1822 (aged 63)
- Spouse: Mary Mainwaring (1797–1809)
- Parent(s): Archibald Douglas; Elizabeth Burchard
- Education: Harrow School
- Alma mater: Corpus Christi College, Cambridge

Philip Douglas, D.D. (27 October 1758 – 2 January 1822) was a British priest and academic in the second half of the eighteenth century and the first decades of the 19th.

== Early life ==
Douglas was born at Witham, Essex, the son of Archibald Douglas of Kirkton and his wife Elizabeth Burchard. Among his siblings were Capt. Archibald Martin John Douglas of the 13th Dragoons (who married Mary Elizabeth Crosbie), Judge William Douglas (who married Jane Bell), and Jane Douglas (who married William Van Mildert, the Bishop of Durham who was the last to rule the County Palatine of Durham).

After attending Harrow School, he was a student at Corpus Christi College, Cambridge, graduating B.A. in 1781; MA in 1784; and B.D. in 1793.

== Career ==
He was appointed Fellow in 1782; Tutor in 1787 and Master in 1795. He was Vice-Chancellor of the University of Cambridge from 1795 to 1796; and again from 1810 to 1811. He was ordained in 1783 and served his title at Whittlesford. He was vicar of Gedney from 1796 until his death.

== Personal life ==
On 15 Jun 1797 at St Bene't's Church, Cambridge, he married Mary Mainwaring (d. 1809), daughter of Anthony Mainwaring. She was brought up by her uncle, Dr. John Mainwaring, Lady Margaret's Professor of Divinity, both sons of Gilbert Mainwaring of Sherrall Hall in the manor of Drayton, near Tamworth, Staffordshire. Together, they were the parents of a son and a daughter:

- Rev. Philip William Douglas (1800–1872), the Vicar of Bonby and Horkstow, curate of Escot; he married Charlotte Barbour, fourth daughter of John Barbour of Adderbury Manor, near Banbury, Oxfordshire, in 1830.
- Mary Douglas (d. 1846), who died unmarried.

His wife died on 3 November 1809 and was buried at St Bene't's Church. Douglas died 2 January 1822, aged 64, and was buried in the Corpus Christi College chapel.

=== Descendants ===
Through his son Philip, he was a grandfather of the Rev. Philip Henry Douglas, who married his cousin, Lucy Elizabeth Jane (née Wescomb), Lady Byron, widow of George Byron, 8th Baron Byron; (Note: Lucy Elizabeth Jane Wescomb was the daughter of Jane (née Douglas) Wescomb and the Rev. William Wescomb of Thrumpton Hall.) John Ambrose Douglas, who married Mary Anne McLachlan and was the father of archaeologist Elizabeth Douglas (who married professor Albert William Van Buren); Sir Robert Kennaway Douglas, who married Rachel Charlotte Kirkby (née Fenton). (Note: They were the parents of Archibald Philip Douglas (1867–1953), Robert Noel Douglas (1868–1957), James Douglas (1870–1958), Sholto Douglas (1873–1916), and Stuart Monro Douglas (b. 1879).)
