= George Byron (disambiguation) =

George Gordon Byron, 6th Baron Byron, commonly known as Lord Byron (1788–1824), was a British poet and writer.

George Byron may also refer to:

- George Byron, 7th Baron Byron (1789–1868), British naval officer, cousin of the poet
- George Byron, 8th Baron Byron (1818–1870), British army officer
- George Byron, 9th Baron Byron (1855–1917), British army officer
- George Byron, American singer

== See also ==
- George Byron Smith (1839–after 1894), Ontario merchant and political figure
- George Byron Lyon-Fellowes (1815–1876), mayor of Ottawa in 1876
- George Byron Currey (1833–1906), American soldier
