= Frederick Byron =

Frederick Byron may refer to:

- Frederick Byron (cricketer) (1822–1861), English cricketer and barrister
- Frederick George Byron (1764–1792), English amateur artist and caricaturist
- Frederick Byron, 10th Baron Byron (1861–1949), Anglican clergyman, peer and politician
