= Lord Frederick FitzRoy =

Lord Frederick FitzRoy JP

Member of Parliament for Thetford
- In office 13 April 1864 – 23 April 1866 Serving with Alexander Baring
- Preceded by: William FitzRoy; Alexander Baring
- Succeeded by: Alexander Baring; Robert Harvey

Personal details
- Born: Lord Frederick John FitzRoy; 4 April 1823
- Died: 12 February 1919 (aged 95)
- Party: Liberal
- Spouse: Catherine Sarah Wilhelmina Wescomb (m. 1853)
- Children: 5
- Parent(s): Henry FitzRoy; Mary Caroline Berkeley
- Relatives: William FitzRoy (brother); Augustus FitzRoy (brother)

Lord Frederick John FitzRoy JP (4 April 1823 – 12 February 1919) was a British Liberal Party politician.

== Early life ==
FitzRoy was the youngest son of Henry FitzRoy, 5th Duke of Grafton and Mary Caroline Berkeley (1795–1873). Among his siblings were Lady Mary Elizabeth Emily FitzRoy (wife of the Rev. Hon. Augustus Phipps, the youngest son of The Earl of Mulgrave), Lady Maria Louisa FitzRoy (wife of Edward Douglas-Pennant, 1st Baron Penrhyn), William FitzRoy, 6th Duke of Grafton, and Augustus FitzRoy, 7th Duke of Grafton.

His paternal grandparents were George FitzRoy, 4th Duke of Grafton and Lady Charlotte Maria Waldegrave (a daughter of the 2nd Earl Waldegrave and Maria Walpole, herself the illegitimate daughter of Sir Edward Walpole). His maternal grandparents were Adm. Hon. Sir George Cranfield Berkeley and Emilia Charlotte Lennox (a daughter of Lord George Lennox).

== Career ==
FitzRoy was elected Liberal MP for Thetford at a by-election in 1863—caused by the succession of his brother William FitzRoy to 6th Duke of Grafton—and held the seat until 1865 when he stood down to seek election in South Northamptonshire, where he was unsuccessful.

FitzRoy was also a Justice of the Peace for Sussex and Northamptonshire, and a Colonel in the Grenadier Guards.

== Personal life ==
In 1853, he married Catherine Sarah Wilhelimna Wescomb, daughter of the Rev. William Wescomb and Jane (née Douglas) Wescomb (a granddaughter of Archibald Douglas, MP). Two of her sisters, married brothers: Lucy Elizabeth Wescomb married George Byron, 8th Baron Byron, and Mary Jane Wescomb, who married Hon. Frederick Byron (both sons of the 7th Baron Byron). Together, they had five children, two sons and three daughters:

- Frederick FitzRoy (1857–1857), who died young.
- Edith Catherine FitzRoy (1858–1858), who died young.
- Anne Ethel FitzRoy (1859–1939), who died unmarried; (Note: A noted eccentric, Ethel had a fear of motorised transport and the refused to acknowledge the existence of British Summer Time.) she lived at Bradfield Hall, Suffolk, during the 1920s.
- Evelyn FitzRoy (1860–1924), who married Emma Kamanu, a daughter of Enoch Kamanu Naea, of Kawaihae, Hawaii and Betty Davidson, in 1889.
- Helen FitzRoy (1861–1861), who died young.

Lady Frederick FitzRoy died on 9 March 1914. Lord Frederick died on 12 February 1919.

Parliament of the United Kingdom
Preceded by William FitzRoy; Alexander Baring	Member of Parliament for Thetford; 1863–1865; With: Alexander Baring	Succeeded by Alexander Baring; Robert Harvey
