= Frederick Byron (cricketer) =

English cricketer and barrister

Personal information
- Full name: Frederick Byron
- Born: 2 February 1822; Cheltenham, Gloucestershire, England
- Died: 4 April 1861 (aged 39); Westminster, London, England
- Batting: Unknown

Domestic team information
- Years: Team
- 1841: Oxford University

Career statistics
Competition	First-class
Matches	1
Runs scored	8
Batting average	4.00
100s/50s	–/–
Top score	6
Catches/stumpings	2/–
- Source: Cricinfo, 4 February 2020

Hon. Frederick Byron DL (3 February 1822 – 4 April 1861) was an English first-class cricketer and barrister.

== Early life ==
Byron was born at Cheltenham in February 1822. He was a younger son of George Byron, 7th Baron Byron and Elizabeth Mary Chandos-Pole, the daughter of Sacheverell Pole Esq., of Radbourne Hall.

He was educated at Westminster School, before going up to Balliol College, Oxford. While studying at Oxford, Byron made a single appearance in first-class cricket for Oxford University against the Marylebone Cricket Club at Oxford in 1841. Batting twice in the match, he was dismissed for 6 runs by James Cobbett in the Oxford first-innings, while in their second-innings he was dismissed for 2 runs by the same bowler. He became a fellow at All Souls College in 1843.

== Career ==
After graduating from Oxford, he became a member of Lincoln's Inn and was called to the bar in 1848. He was commissioned as a lieutenant in the Sherwood Foresters in April 1850. Byron was appointed as a deputy lieutenant for Essex in September 1853. He was promoted to captain in the Sherwood Foresters in March 1859.

== Personal life ==
In 1851, Byron married Mary Jane Wescomb, a daughter of the Rev. William Wescomb and Jane Douglas. Mary Jane's sister, Lucy Elizabeth Jane Wescomb, married his elder brother, George Byron, 8th Baron Byron. Another sister, Catherine Sarah Wilhelimna Wescomb, married Lord Frederick FitzRoy (youngest son of the 5th Duke of Grafton). Together, they lived at Thrumpton Hall and were the parents of three children:

- Hon. Eva Lucy Mary Byron (1853–1895), who married Col. Henry Robert Eyre of Middleton Lodge, son of Gen. Henry Eyre and Elizabeth Martha (née Allgood) Eyre, in 1879.
- George Byron, 9th Baron Byron (1855–1917), who married Fanny Lucy Radmall Brinckman, the fourth daughter of Thomas Radmall and Maria Isabella Clark, in 1901. After his death, she married Sir Robert Houston, 1st Baronet.
- Frederick Ernest Charles Byron, 10th Baron Byron (1861–1949), a Reverend who married Lady Anna Ismay Ethel FitzRoy, daughter of Rev. Lord Charles Edward FitzRoy (youngest son of the 7th Duke of Grafton) and Hon. Ismay Mary Helen Augusta FitzRoy (a daughter of the 3rd Baron Southampton), in 1921.

He died suddenly, aged 39, at Westminster in April 1861, predeceasing his father. Byron's son George later became the 9th Baron Byron upon the death of Bryon's elder brother, George Byron, 8th Baron Byron.
