= Bath House, Piccadilly =

Demolished residence in London, England

Coordinates: 51.506558°N 0.143524°W

Bath House was the London town house of the Barons Ashburton in the 19th century. Formerly the site of the Pulteney Hotel, the property was acquired by Mr. Alexander Baring from William Pulteney, 1st Earl of Bath in 1821 and rebuilt and renamed after the Earl.

== History ==
Located at 82 Piccadilly on the western corner of Bolton Street, facing Piccadilly, it ranked alongside Devonshire House, Burlington House, Montague House, Lansdowne House, Londonderry House, Northumberland House and Norfolk House. All of these have been long demolished, except Burlington and Lansdowne, both of which have been substantially altered.

In 1858 the house witnessed a marriage of Louisa Caroline as she became Lady Ashburton but by 1866 the Dowager Lady Ashburton relinquished ownership of Bath House and its contents to her brother-in-law Francis Baring, 3rd Baron Ashburton. His son, Alexander Baring, 4th Baron Ashburton succeeded to the peerage and the property on 6 September 1868 and died at the house on 18 July 1889.

Bath House was sold to Baron Maurice de Hirsch in 1890. After a while, it was bought by diamond mining magnate and art collector Julius Wernher. The house was demolished in 1960.

== Art collection ==
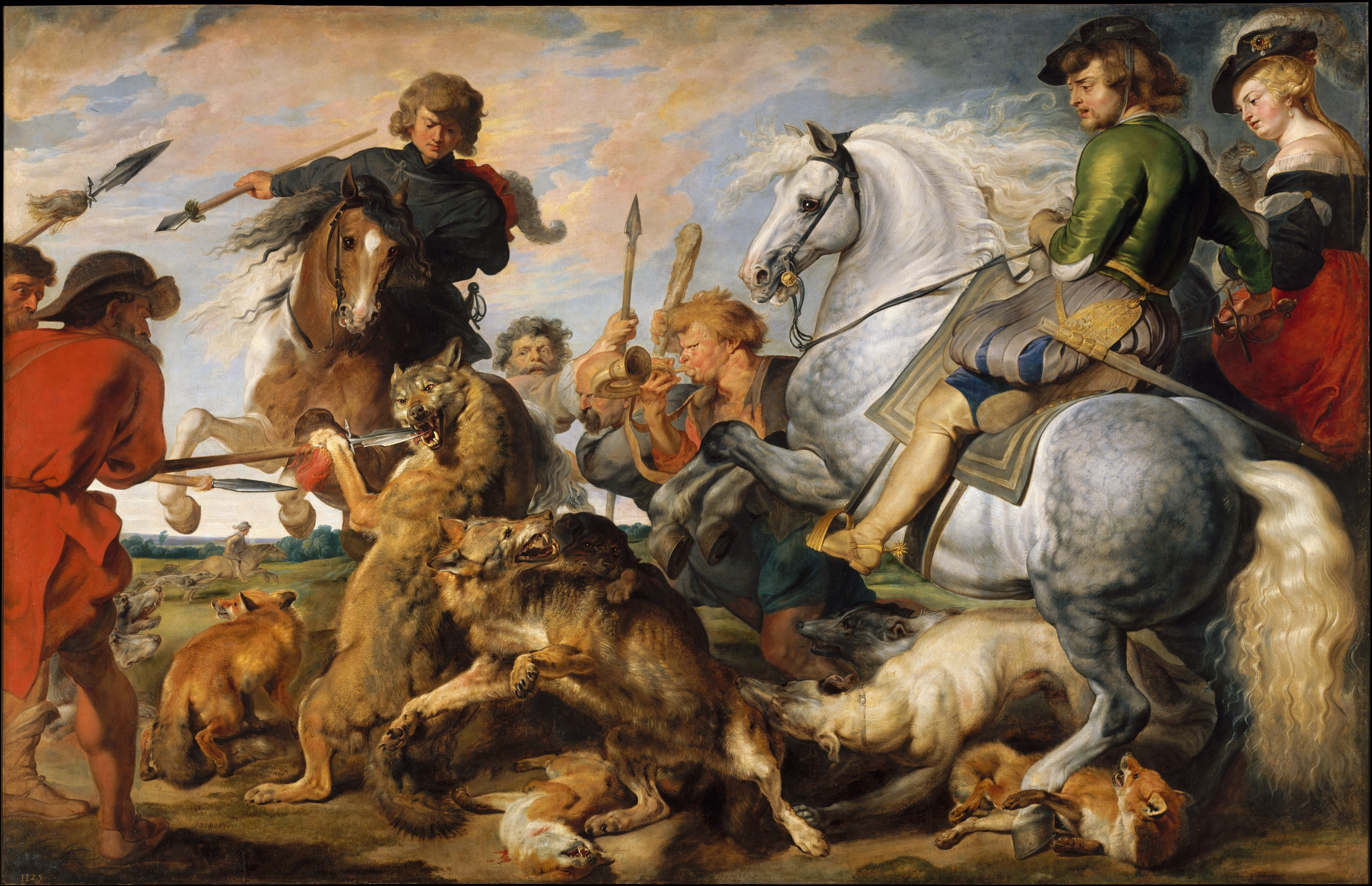
Wolf and Fox Hunt by Peter Paul Rubens.

Walford noted that it contained "a fine collection of pictures, chiefly of the Dutch and Flemish schools, formed by the builder of the mansion ... afterwards the first Lord Ashburton of the present creation. Dr. Waagen gives a list of the pictures to be seen here, in his work on Art and Artists in England."

Waagen included the 1st Lord Ashburton in a list of "the most distinguished collectors in England since 1792" (I:26-7) in the 1854 edition of his work, Treasures of Art in Great Britain.

By 1873, the house held part of the collection formed by the 1st & 2nd Lord Ashburton.

Julius Wernher housed part of his art collection at Bath House (the rest was at his country house Luton Hoo) and amongst his collection was Albrecht Altdorfer's painting Christ Taking Leave of His Mother now part of the National Gallery's collection.

=== 1873 fire ===
On 31 January 1873 a fire at the house burned "until the splendid drawing room and its contents had been somewhat severely damaged" (The Times, 3 Feb 1873: 12). A letter from Charlotte Polidori, quoted in another letter to Dante Gabriel Rossetti summarized the damage: "All the pictures except three [Leonardo, Titian, and Rubens]... in the Bath House drawing room are destroyed." The three paintings referred to were subsequently identified as Christ and the Baptist as children (likely by Bernardino Luini, now lost), Wolf and fox-hunt (Rubens, now in the Metropolitan Museum, from the collection of Lord Ashburton), and A woman with a dish of roasted apples (Pieter de Hooch, in fact destroyed in the fire).

Rossetti's correspondence regarding the losses described two pictures attributed to Giorgione, two attributed to Titian or Paris Bordone, and a Velazquez.
