= Alexander Baring =

Alexander Baring may refer to:

- Alexander Baring, 1st Baron Ashburton (1774–1848), British politician and financier
- Alexander Baring, 4th Baron Ashburton (1835–1889), British politician and landowner
- Alexander Baring, 6th Baron Ashburton (1898–1991), British politician and businessman
