= Francis Baring =

Francis Baring may refer to:

- Sir Francis Baring, 1st Baronet (1740–1810), English merchant banker
- Francis Baring, 1st Baron Northbrook (1796–1866), British politician
- Francis Baring, 2nd Earl of Northbrook (1850–1929), British politician
- Francis Baring, 3rd Baron Ashburton (1800–1868), British peer and politician
- Francis Baring, 5th Baron Ashburton (1866–1938), British peer and politician
- Francis Baring, 6th Baron Northbrook (born 1954), British peer and Conservative politician
