= Thomas Colby (MP for Thetford) =

16th-century English politician

Thomas Colby (died 1588), of Roos Hall, Beccles, Suffolk, was an English politician.

== Family ==
Colby was the son of John Colby of Beccles and his wife, Ursula née Rede, daughter of Edward Rede of Norwich. Ursula had been widowed three times before: by Thomas Garneys of Beccles, by Thomas Browne of Attleborough, Norfolk and by Sir John Brende of Beccles. Thomas Colby married Beatrice Felton, daughter of Thomas Felton of Playford, Suffolk. They had six sons and three daughters.

== Career ==
He was a Member (MP) of the Parliament of England for Thetford in 1572.

Parliament of England
Preceded by Philip Appleyard; Thomas Hogan	Member of Parliament for Thetford; 1572; With: William Humberston then Sir Valentine Browne	Succeeded by Edward Eden; Robert Whitney
