= James FitzRoy =

James FitzRoy may refer to:

- James FitzRoy, Earl of Euston (1947–2009)
- Lord James FitzRoy (1804–1834), British politician
