= Lord Charles FitzRoy (British Army officer, born 1791) =

British Army officer and politician

Lieutenant-Colonel The Right Honourable Lord Charles FitzRoy
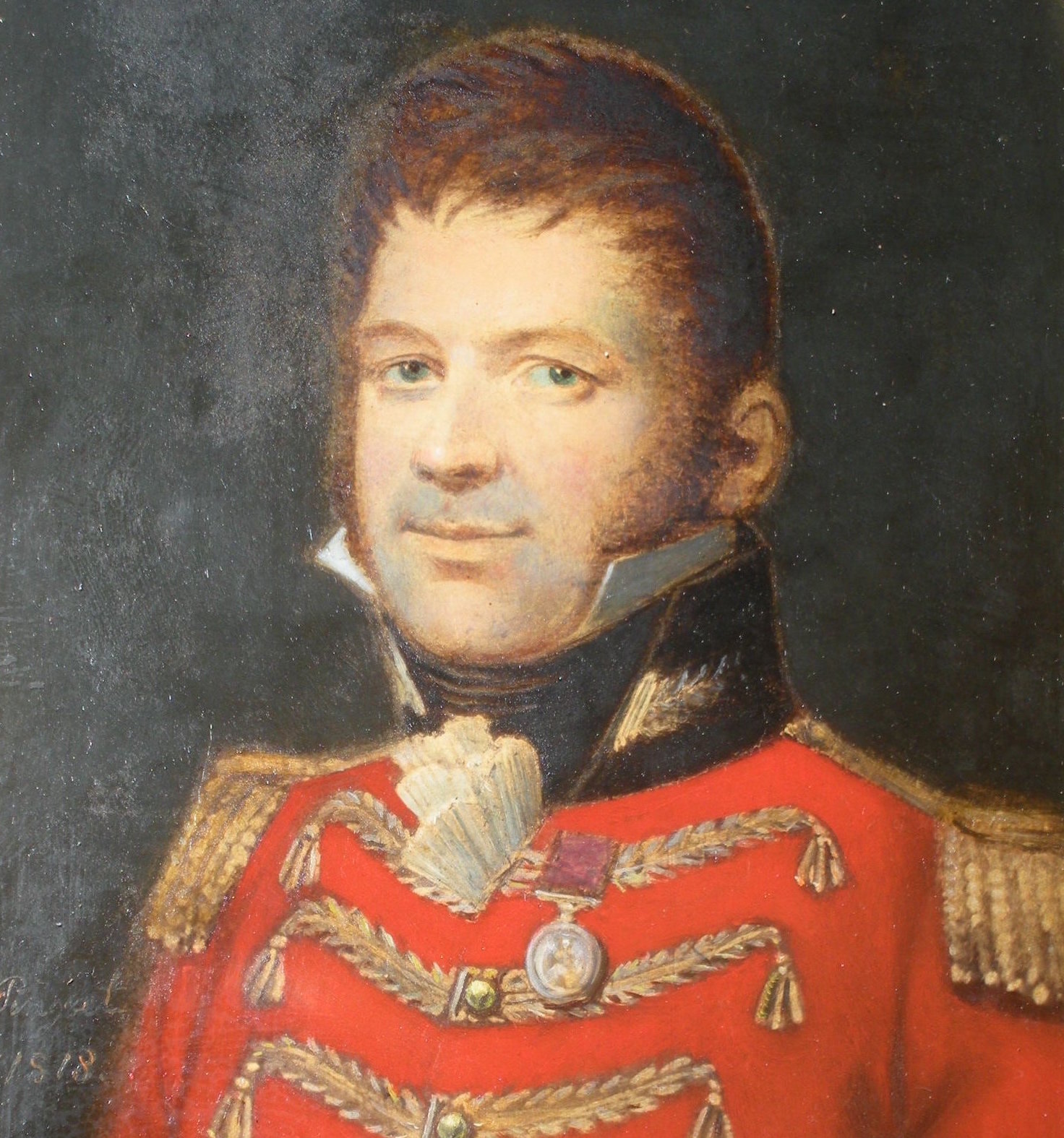
- Portrait by Édouard Pingret, 1818

Vice-Chamberlain of the Household
- In office 29 June 1835 – 27 April 1838
- Monarchs: William IV; Victoria
- Prime Minister: The Viscount Melbourne
- Preceded by: Viscount Castlereagh
- Succeeded by: The Earl of Belfast

Personal details
- Born: 28 February 1791
- Died: 17 June 1865 (aged 74)
- Party: Whig
- Spouse: Lady Anne Cavendish (m. 1825)

Military service
- Allegiance: United Kingdom
- Branch/service: British Army
- Years of service: 1807–1821
- Rank: Major; Brevet Lieutenant-Colonel
- Battles/wars: Napoleonic Wars; Peninsular War; Battle of Corunna; Walcheren Campaign; Battle of Vitoria; Battle of the Pyrenees; Battle of Nivelle; Battle of the Nive; Battle of Orthez; Battle of Toulouse (1814); Battle of Waterloo

Lieutenant-Colonel Lord Charles FitzRoy (28 February 1791 – 17 June 1865) was a British Army officer and Whig politician who served in the Napoleonic Wars. He fought at the Battle of Waterloo and later held political office as Vice-Chamberlain of the Household between 1835 and 1838.

== Background ==
Charles Fitzroy was born on 28 February 1791, the second son of George FitzRoy, 4th Duke of Grafton and his wife Lady Charlotte Maria Waldegrave, daughter of James Waldegrave, 2nd Earl Waldegrave. Henry FitzRoy, 5th Duke of Grafton was his elder brother.

== Army career ==
Fitzroy was commissioned into the British Army in 1807 and fought in the 1809 Battle of Corunna of the Peninsular War, before joining the Walcheren Campaign the same year. He subsequently joined Lord Hill's staff in Spain and was present at the capture of Badajoz in 1812 and the battles of Vittoria, the Pyrenees, Nivelle, the Nive, Orthez and Toulouse serving as a Deputy Assistant Adjutant General (DAAG).

At the Battle of Waterloo in 1815, Fitzroy served on Wellington's staff as a captain in the 1st Regiment of Foot Guards and an Assistant Adjutant General (AAG). He then served on Wellington's staff in the army of occupation in Paris after Waterloo. His portrait was painted by Edouard Pingret (who also painted a very similar portrait of Colonel Dawson Kelly) in 1818 wearing the Waterloo medal on his AAG uniform. He retired from the army on half pay as a major and brevet lieutenant-colonel of the 27th Regiment of Foot in 1821.

In retirement, he was chairman of the Finance Committee and honorary member of the 43rd Middlesex Rifle Volunteers.

== Political career ==
FitzRoy was elected as a Member of Parliament (MP) for Thetford at the 1818 general election, and held the seat until the 1830 general election, which he did not contest. He returned to Commons the following year, when he was elected at the 1831 general election as MP for Bury St Edmunds. He held the seat until 1847, when he did not stand again. When the Whigs came to power under Lord Melbourne in 1835, FitzRoy was sworn of the Privy Council and appointed Vice-Chamberlain of the Household, a post he held until 1838.

== Family ==
Fitzroy married Lady Anne Cavendish, daughter of George Cavendish, 1st Earl of Burlington and Lady Elizabeth Compton, on 25 October 1825. They had two sons and two daughters. He died on 17 June 1865 at Hampton, aged 74. Lady Charles FitzRoy died in May 1871, aged 83.

Parliament of the United Kingdom
Preceded by Lord John FitzRoy; Thomas Creevey	Member of Parliament for Thetford; 1818–1830; With: Nicholas Ridley-Colborne 1818–1826; Bingham Baring 1826–1830	Succeeded by Lord James FitzRoy; Francis Baring
Preceded by Charles Augustus Fitzroy; The Earl Jermyn	Member of Parliament for Bury St Edmunds; 1831–1847; With: The Earl Jermyn	Succeeded by Edward Bunbury; The Earl Jermyn
Political offices
Preceded by Viscount Castlereagh	Vice-Chamberlain of the Household; 1835–1838	Succeeded by The Earl of Belfast
