= Alexander Baring, 4th Baron Ashburton =

British landowner and Conservative Party politician

The Right Honourable The Lord Ashburton DL

Member of the House of Lords
- Lord Temporal
- In office 6 September 1868 – 18 July 1889
- Preceded by: The 3rd Baron Ashburton
- Succeeded by: The 5th Baron Ashburton

Member of Parliament for Thetford
- In office 1857–1867 Serving with: William FitzRoy, Earl of Euston, to 1863; Lord Frederick FitzRoy 1863–1865; Robert Harvey from 1865
- Preceded by: Francis Baring; William FitzRoy, Earl of Euston
- Succeeded by: Robert Harvey; Edward Gordon

Personal details
- Born: 4 May 1835
- Died: 18 July 1889 (aged 54); Bath House, Piccadilly, England
- Spouse: Leonora Caroline Digby (m. 1864)
- Relations: Hugues-Bernard Maret, duc de Bassano (grandfather)
- Children: 7
- Parent(s): Francis Baring, 3rd Baron Ashburton; Hortense Eugenie Claire Maret de Bassano
- Education: Harrow School
- Alma mater: Christ Church, Oxford

Alexander Hugh Baring, 4th Baron Ashburton, DL (4 May 1835 – 18 July 1889), was a British landowner and Conservative Party politician.

== Early life ==
Baring was the son of Francis Baring, 3rd Baron Ashburton (1800–1868), and his wife Hortense Eugenie Claire Maret de Bassano (c. 1812–1882). His sister, Marie Anne Louise Baring, was the wife of William FitzRoy, 6th Duke of Grafton.

His paternal grandparents were Alexander Baring, 1st Baron Ashburton, and the American heiress Ann Louisa Bingham (whose father was U.S. Senator William Bingham). His father was the younger brother of Bingham Baring, 2nd Baron Ashburton, and among his paternal relatives was Harriet Baring (wife of Henry Thynne, 3rd Marquess of Bath). His maternal grandfather was Hugues-Bernard Maret, duc de Bassano, the former Prime Minister of France.

He was educated at Harrow School and Christ Church, Oxford, graduating in 1857.

== Career ==
Baring was elected unopposed as a Member of Parliament (MP) for Thetford at a by-election in December 1857, filling the vacancy caused by his father's succession to the peerage. He was re-elected in 1859 and 1865, and held the seat until he succeeded to the peerage in 1868 on the death of his father.

On 16 June 1864, Baring was appointed to be a Deputy Lieutenant of the County of Norfolk. A member of the Baring family, he succeeded to the title of Baron Ashburton on 6 September 1868.

== Personal life ==
On 5 January 1864, Baring was married to Leonora Caroline Digby, daughter of Edward Digby, 9th Baron Digby, and Lady Theresa Anna Maria Fox-Strangways (eldest daughter of Henry Fox-Strangways, 3rd Earl of Ilchester). Together, they were the parents of:

- Francis Denzil Edward Baring, 5th Baron Ashburton (1866–1938), who married Mabel Edith Hood, eldest daughter of Francis Hood, 4th Viscount Hood, in 1889.
- Capt. Frederick Arthur Baring (1867–1961), who married Laura Louisa Hobson, a daughter of Frederick Hobson of Hockley House, in 1890.
- Alexander Henry Baring (1869–1948)
- Lt.-Col. Guy Victor Baring (1873–1916), who married Olive Alethea Smith, sister of Vivian Smith, 1st Baron Bicester, and youngest daughter of Hugh Colin Smith, a Governor of the Bank of England, in 1903. An MP for Winchester, he was killed in action on 15 September 1916.
- Lilian Theresa Clare Baring (1874–1962), who married Lt.-Col. Frederick Loch Adams, Military Secretary to the Viceroy of India and youngest son of William Patrick Adam, in 1906.
- Caryl Digby Baring (1880–1956), who served in the Boer War and the Great War and married Ivy Firman, a sister of Humphrey Firman and daughter of Humphrey Brooke Firman, in 1907.
- Dorothy Mary Baring (1885–1893)

He was an art collector and owned many prominent pieces, including Rembrandt's 1660 self portrait, Aelbert Cuyp's Horsemen and Herdsmen with Cattle (1655/1660), and Meindert Hobbema's Hut among Trees (c. 1664). Known affectionately as 'Aclick' to members of his family, he was also a keen yachtsman and embarked on many overseas tours including Scandinavia and the Caribbean. It was returning from such a trip that led to his final demise, after catching a sickness, whilst in Hong Kong from which he never seemed to fully recover. Shortly after, whilst in Chicago, his physician was very concerned for his health however, he made good improvements and was expected to fully recover before dying suddenly shortly after returning to England.

Lord Ashburton died at Bath House, Piccadilly, in London, and was succeeded in his title by his eldest son Francis. His widow died on 19 August 1930.

He owned 36,000 acres.

Parliament of the United Kingdom
Preceded by Francis Baring; William FitzRoy, Earl of Euston	Member of Parliament for Thetford; 1857–1867; With: William FitzRoy, Earl of Euston, to 1863; Lord Frederick FitzRoy 1863–1865; Robert Harvey from 1865	Succeeded by Robert Harvey; Edward Gordon
Peerage of the United Kingdom
Preceded by Francis Baring	Baron Ashburton; 2nd creation 1868–1889; Member of the House of Lords (1868–1889)	Succeeded by Francis Baring
