= Thrumpton Hall =

Country house in Thrumpton, Nottinghamshire, England

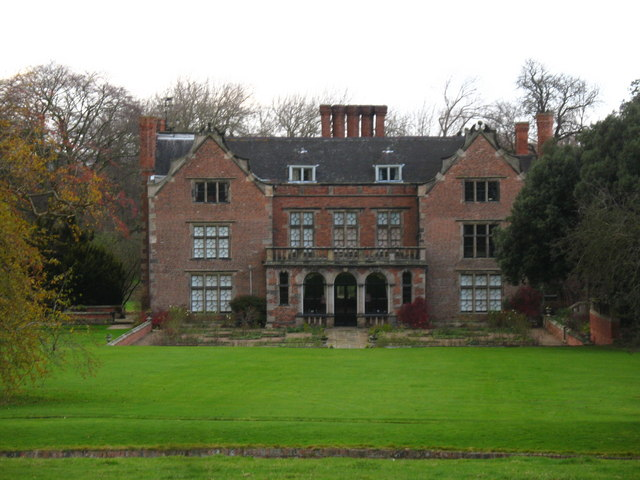

- Location within Nottinghamshire

General information
- Location: Thrumpton Hall, Church Lane, Thrumpton, NG11 0AX
- Coordinates: 52.875065°N 1.245784°W
- Completed: 1617
- Client: Gervase Pigot
- Owner: Miranda Seymour

Design and construction
- Designations: Grade I listed building

Website
- Thrumpton Hall

Thrumpton Hall is an English country house in the village of Thrumpton near Nottingham. It operated as a wedding venue until November 2020.

== History ==
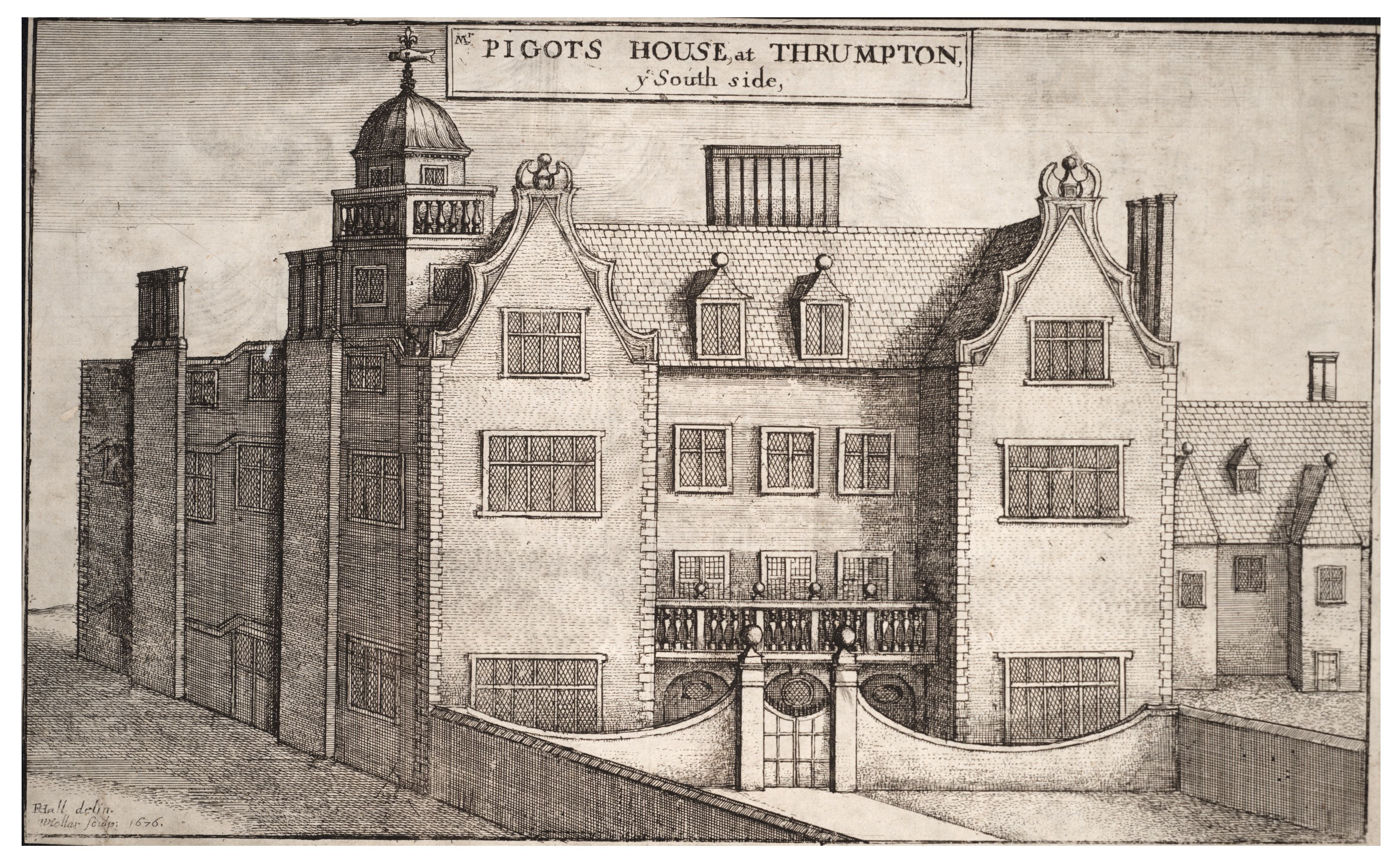
Engraving of Thrumpton Hall by Wenceslas Hollar

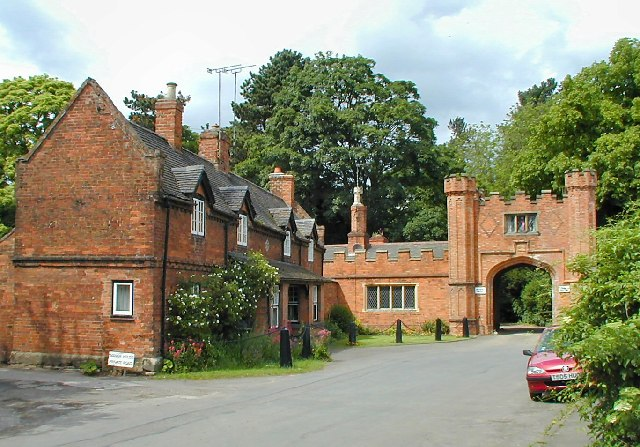
Gatehouse of Thrumpton Hall

This historic house incorporates a substantial part of an older house which was occupied by the Roman Catholic Powdrell family who were evicted following the Babington Plot.

The main part of the Hall dates from the early part of the seventeenth century and was built by the Pigot family in rose-coloured brick. it was largely complete by 1617.

In the 1660s it was altered and improved by his son Gervase Pigot. There were late eighteenth century alterations made for John Wescomb Emerton, further changes c.1830 for John Emerton Wescomb. Later, it passed into the hands of the Byron family for a hundred years; Byron's daughter, Ada, visited her relations at the Hall from her mother's home at Kirkby Mallory, and during visits to Newstead Abbey, which had passed out of Byron ownership.

=== Owners ===
- Powdrill or Powdrell family
- Gervase Pigot
- Gervase Pigot (son) ?–1685
- John Emerton 1685–1745
- John Wescomb Emerton 1745–1823
- John Emerton Wescomb 1823–1838
- Rev. William Wescomb
- George Byron, 8th Baron Byron ?–1870 who had, in 1843, married Lucy Wescomb, the daughter of the Rev. William Wescomb, the last of his family in the male line to own Thrumpton.
- George Byron, 9th Baron Byron 1870–1917 who had no children, so the estate once more went 'sideways' to his brother
- Frederick Byron, 10th Baron Byron 1917–1949, Vicar of Langford in Essex and while, as it were, 'in waiting' was Vicar of Thrumpton in 1914, succeeding his brother and so becoming 'Squarson' of the estate three years later. The 10th Lord married Lady Anna FitzRoy, sister of the 10th Duke of Grafton.
- George Fitzroy Seymour 1949–1994 (the son of Lady Byron's sister Lady Victoria Seymour (née FitzRoy) and a member of the family of the Marquess of Hertford) and his wife Rosemary, youngest sister of John Scott-Ellis, 9th Baron Howard de Walden
- Miranda Seymour since 1994

== Features ==
It contains a library, a medieval kitchen, a double cube reception room, baronial hall, and a priest hole. It also hosts a collection of portraits, furniture and needlework, as well as various relics of the poet Lord Byron, whose descendants lived at Thrumpton.

Thrumpton Hall is renowned for its cantilever Jacobean staircase, carved in wood from the estate. This was added to the earlier house by the Pigot family, and shows their coat of arms and that of the former Powdrell owners. The staircase was supervised by John Webb, a pupil of Inigo Jones.

== See also ==
- Grade I listed buildings in Nottinghamshire
- Listed buildings in Thrumpton
