= Henry James FitzRoy, Earl of Euston =

British nobleman (1848–1912)

Earl of Euston DL
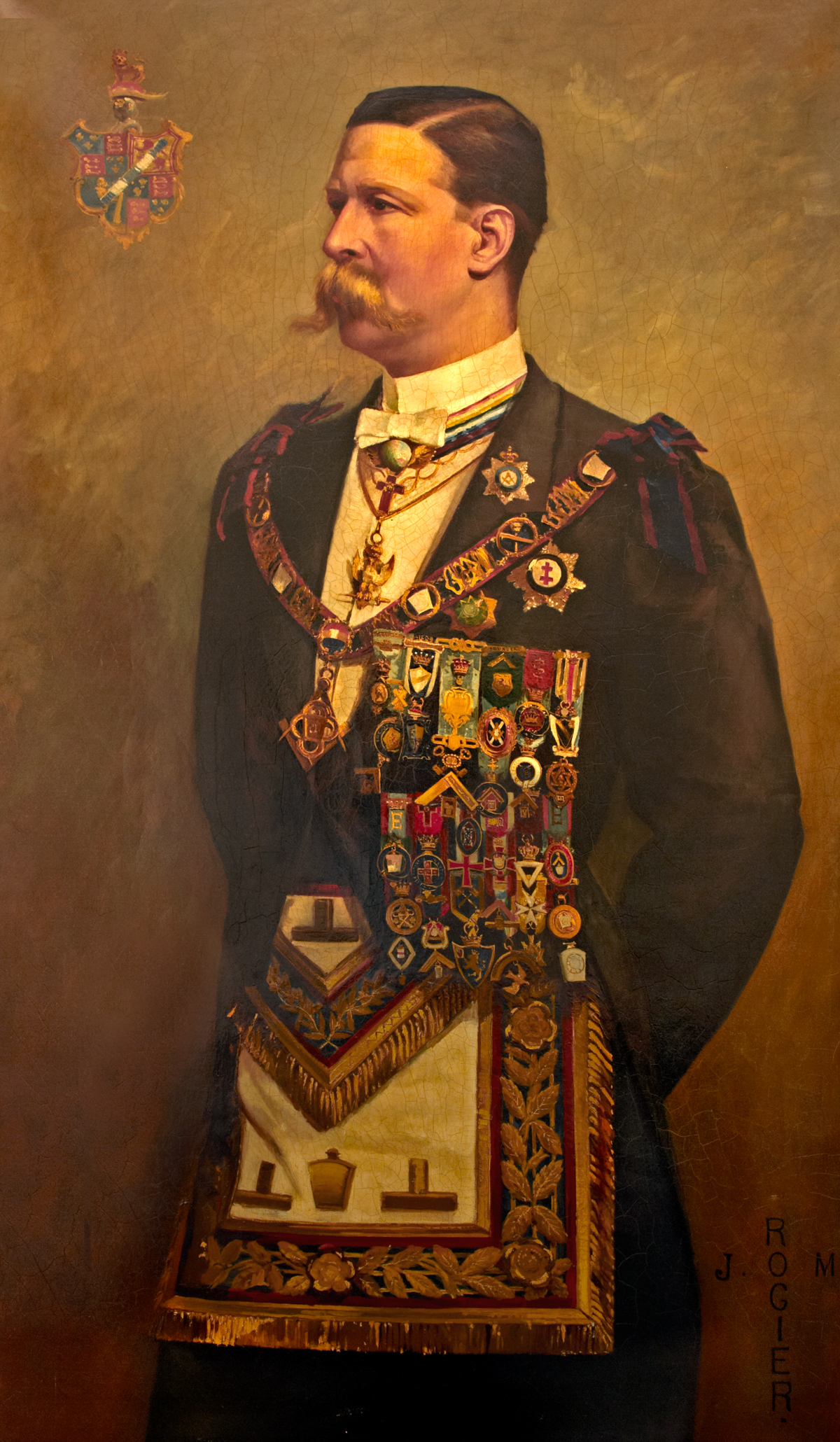
- Euston in Masonic attire. He was a Provincial Grand Master.
- Born: Henry James FitzRoy; 28 November 1848; London, England
- Died: 10 May 1912 (aged 63); Potterspury, Northamptonshire, England
- Spouse: Kate Walsh (m. 1871; died 1903)
- Parents: Augustus FitzRoy, 7th Duke of Grafton; Anna Balfour

Henry James FitzRoy, Earl of Euston DL (28 November 1848 – 10 May 1912) was the eldest son and heir apparent of Augustus FitzRoy, 7th Duke of Grafton. His mother was the daughter of MP James Balfour.

== Personal life ==
Euston married a music hall artiste "Kate Cooke", real name Kate Walsh, daughter of John Walsh, on 29 May 1871 at St. Michael's Church, Worcester. Described as "one of the most notorious women in London" she was at least ten years his senior. They had no children, and separated after three years, Euston securing a government position in Australia. Having discovered that Walsh had contracted a bigamous marriage, he returned to London to seek an annulment. At great expense Walsh's presumed husband was located in New Zealand and brought to London. In a case that was termed "stranger than fiction", at the last moment of the cross examination of Walsh's husband in court it was discovered that three years prior to marrying her, he had wedded another woman. His marriage to Walsh was therefore invalid, and hers to Euston legitimate. Walsh remained Lady Euston until she died in 1903, predeceasing Lord Euston by nine years.

=== Cleveland Street scandal ===
In 1890, Euston was embroiled in the Cleveland Street scandal when he was accused of visiting a male brothel at 19 Cleveland Street in London by The North London Press, an obscure radical weekly newspaper edited by Ernest Parke. Euston sued Parke for libel. At the trial Euston admitted that when walking along Piccadilly he had been given a card by a tout which read "Poses plastiques. C. Hammond, 19 Cleveland Street". Euston testified that he went along to the house, believing Poses plastiques to mean a display of female nudes. He paid a sovereign to get in. On entry, Euston said he was appalled to discover the "improper" nature of the place and immediately left. The defence witnesses contradicted each other, and could not describe Euston accurately.

The final defence witness, John Saul, was a male prostitute who admitted to earning his living by leading an "immoral life" and "practising criminality". The jury did not believe the defence witnesses and found in favour of Euston. H. Montgomery Hyde, an eminent historian of homosexuality, later wrote that there was little doubt that Euston was telling the truth and only visited 19 Cleveland Street once because he was misled by the card. However, Robert Cliburn, a young man who specialised in blackmailing older homosexual men, told Oscar Wilde that Euston was one of his victims.

== Later career ==
In 1894, while presiding at a police court in Towcester, Euston sentenced a man to one month's imprisonment for stealing a cake valued at 3d from a shop in the village of Blisworth, then part of the ducal estate. The heavy sentence drew newspaper coverage and caused widespread indignation.

In the coronation year of 1901, he was appointed aide-de-camp to Edward VII.

In 1902, Euston was taken to court by moneylenders over a dishonoured bill payment. It was stated that he was liable for up to fifteen thousand pounds to various moneylenders. In court, Euston stated the loans had been raised to assist the solicitor Arthur Newton out of "simple friendliness" while he had been acting for him. The court found against Euston. Newton had acted for Lord Arthur Somerset during the Cleveland Street scandal. A few months later Euston was declared bankrupt, with liabilities of over 54,269 pounds and assets of just 174 pounds.

Euston was appointed a deputy lieutenant of Northamptonshire in 1907.

He died in 1912 of dropsy at Wakefield Lodge, Potterspury, Northamptonshire. As his death occurred six years before the death of his father, he never inherited his father's lands and titles. His younger brother, Alfred, became the 8th Duke of Grafton.
