= William Daunce =

16th-century English politician

William Daunce (also Dauntesey) (c. 1500 – 28 May 1548) was an English Member of Parliament during the Tudor period.

He was the son of Sir John Daunce, General Surveyor of the King's Lands, from Thame in Oxfordshire and son-in-law of Sir Thomas More, having married his daughter, Elizabeth in 1525. Elizabeth and William had seven children together: John, Thomas, Bartholemew, William, Germain, Alice and Elizabeth. Three years later, William was appointed Teller of the Receipt of the Exchequer and was elected a Member of Parliament for Thetford from 1529 to 1536. He lived mostly in London, but also inherited land at Mursley in Buckinghamshire from his father. He died on 28 May 1548.
