= Sir Robert Harvey, 1st Baronet, of Crown Point =

Sir Robert John Harvey Harvey, 1st Baronet (16 April 1817 – 19 July 1870) was a British Conservative Party politician. He sat in the House of Commons from 1865 to 1868.

Harvey was the eldest son of General Sir Robert John Harvey of Mousehold House in Norwich. He was elected at the 1865 general election as a member of parliament (MP) for the borough of Thetford in Norfolk, having unsuccessfully contested the seat at a by-election in April 1863. The borough was disenfranchised at the 1868 general election, and Harvey did not stand for Parliament again. The latter year he was created a Baronet, of Crown Point in the parish of Trowse in the County of Norfolk.

Harvey married Lady Henrietta Augusta Lambart, daughter of George Frederick Augustus Lambart, Viscount Kilcoursie, in 1845. He shot himself in July 1870, aged 53, after the collapse of the Crown Bank, and is buried in a large mausoleum in the graveyard at Kirby Bedon, Norfolk. He was succeeded in the title by his son Charles. His grandson Oliver Harvey became British Ambassador to France and was created Baron Harvey of Tasburgh in 1954. Lady Harvey died in 1874.

== Sources ==
- Kidd, Charles, Williamson, David (editors). Debrett's Peerage and Baronetage (1990 edition). New York: St Martin's Press, 1990,
- Leigh Rayment's list of baronets
- Leigh Rayment's Historical List of MPs

Parliament of the United Kingdom
Preceded by Alexander Baring; Lord Frederick John Fitzroy	Member of Parliament for Thetford; 1865–1868; With: Alexander Baring 1865–1867; Edward Gordon 1867–1868	Constituency abolished
Baronetage of the United Kingdom
New creation	Baronet (of Crown Point); 1868–1870	Succeeded by Charles Harvey
