= Alexander Baring, 1st Baron Ashburton =

British politician, diplomat and financier (1774–1848)

The Right Honourable The Lord Ashburton PC
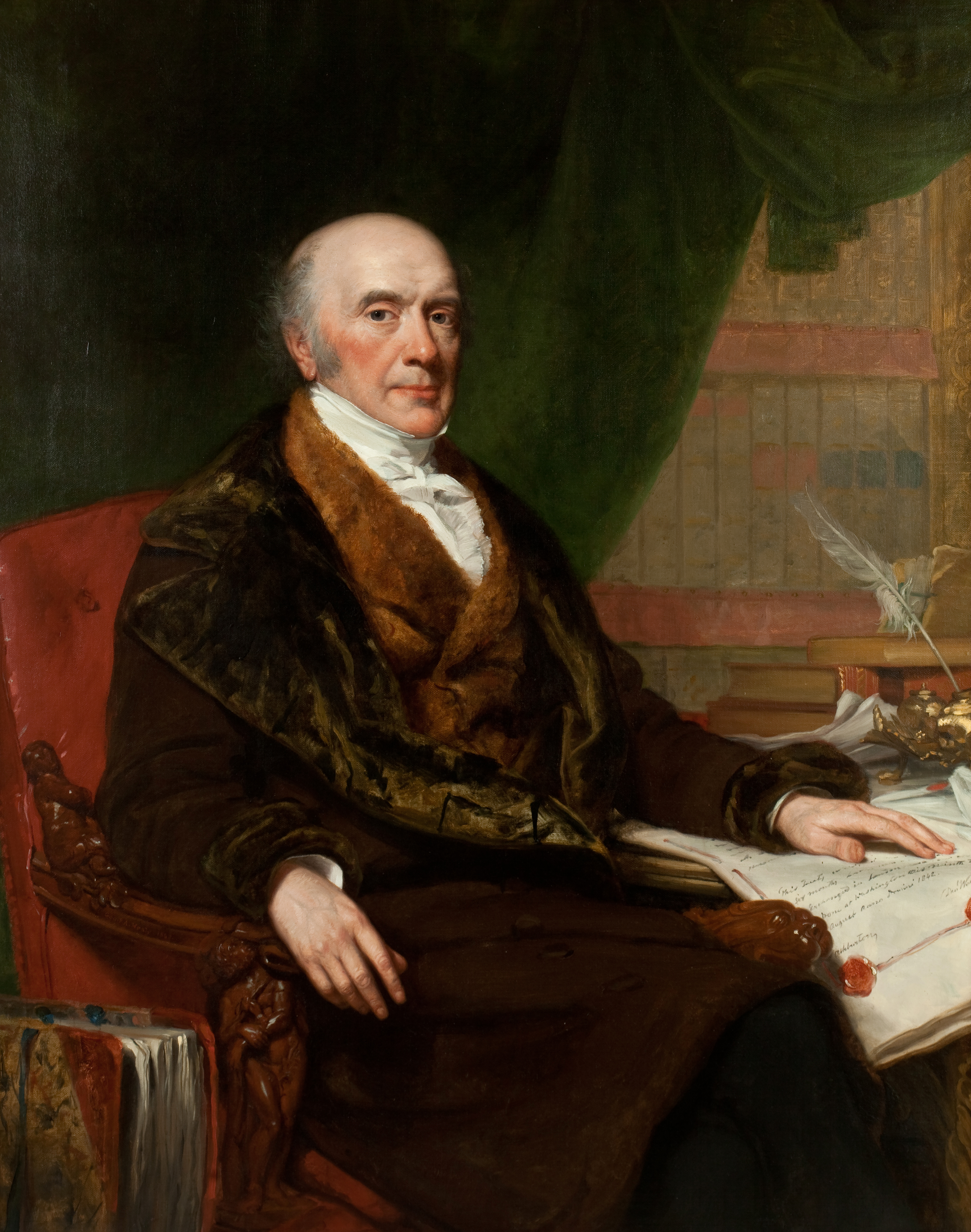
- Portrait by George Peter Alexander Healy, c. 1843

Member of the House of Lords
- Lord Temporal
- In office 8 April 1835 – 12 May 1848
- Preceded by: Peerage created
- Succeeded by: The 2nd Baron Ashburton

President of the Board of Trade
- In office 15 December 1834 – 8 April 1835
- Monarch: William IV
- Prime Minister: Sir Robert Peel, Bt
- Preceded by: Charles Poulett Thomson
- Succeeded by: Charles Poulett Thomson

Master of the Mint
- In office 23 December 1834 – 8 April 1835
- Monarch: William IV
- Prime Minister: Sir Robert Peel, Bt
- Preceded by: James Abercromby
- Succeeded by: Henry Labouchere

Personal details
- Born: 27 October 1774
- Died: 12 May 1848 (aged 73) Longleat, Wiltshire, England
- Party: Tory
- Spouse: Ann Louisa Bingham (m. 1798)
- Children: 9
- Parent(s): Sir Francis Baring, Bt; Harriet Herring Baring

Alexander Baring, 1st Baron Ashburton (27 October 1774 – 12 May 1848) was a British politician, diplomat and financier. A member of the Baring family, he was the second son of Sir Francis Baring, 1st Baronet.

== Early life ==
Alexander was born on 27 October 1774. He was the second son born to Harriet Herring (1750–1804) and Sir Francis Baring, 1st Baronet (1740–1810). Among his siblings was Maria (the mother of Francis Stainforth), Thomas, Henry (a Member of Parliament for Bossiney and Colchester), and George Baring (who founded the Hong Kong trading house of Dent & Co.). His father, alongside his uncle, John Baring, established the London merchant house of John and Francis Baring Company, which eventually became Barings Bank.

His paternal grandparents were Elizabeth Vowler and Johann Baring, a wool merchant who emigrated to England in 1717 from Germany and established the family in England. His maternal grandfather was merchant William Herring of Croydon and among his mother's family was her cousin, Thomas Herring, Archbishop of Canterbury.

== Career ==
Alexander was brought up in his father's business, and became a partner at Hope and Company. He was later sent to the United States for various land deals, and formed wide connections with wealthy, socially prominent American families. In 1807, Alexander became a partner in the family financial firm, along with his brothers Sir Thomas Baring, 2nd Baronet (1772–1848), and Henry Baring (1777–1848), and the name was then changed to Baring Brothers & Company. When Henry Hope died in 1811, the London offices of Hope & Company then merged with the bank of Baring Brothers & Company,

=== Political career ===
Baring sat in Parliament in the lower chamber of the House of Commons for Taunton 1806–1826, later for Callington 1826–1831, and then subsequently for Thetford 1831–1832 and following for North Essex 1832–1835. In 1835, he was elevated as a Lord Temporal to the upper parliamentary chamber of the House of Lords, sitting in London for 13 years until his 1848 death.

He regarded politics from the point of view of the businessman. He opposed the orders-in-council for "the restrictions on trade with the United States" in 1812, before the tragic renewed hostilities ensued between the two English-speaking nations of the War of 1812. Fifteen years later, in 1826, he also opposed the act for the suppression of small banknotes, as well as other reforms. He accepted the important post in the realm of Chancellor of the Exchequer in the government proposed of pivotal June 1815 Battle of Waterloo's victor, famed British Army general and now first Duke of Wellington's projected ministry of 1832 as prime minister; but afterwards, alarmed at the type of men then serving in Parliament declared: "he would face a thousand devils rather than such a House of Commons." After the financial Panic of 1847 and subsequent economic recession, Baring headed an external bi-metallist monetary movement hoping to prevent the undue restriction of the British currency and coinage of the pound sterling.

Baring was Master of the Mint in British Prime Minister Sir Robert Peel's government and, on Peel's retirement in 1835, was raised to the peerage as Baron Ashburton, of Ashburton, in the County of Devon, a title previously held by his uncle-in-law, John Dunning, 1st Baron Ashburton (1731–1783).

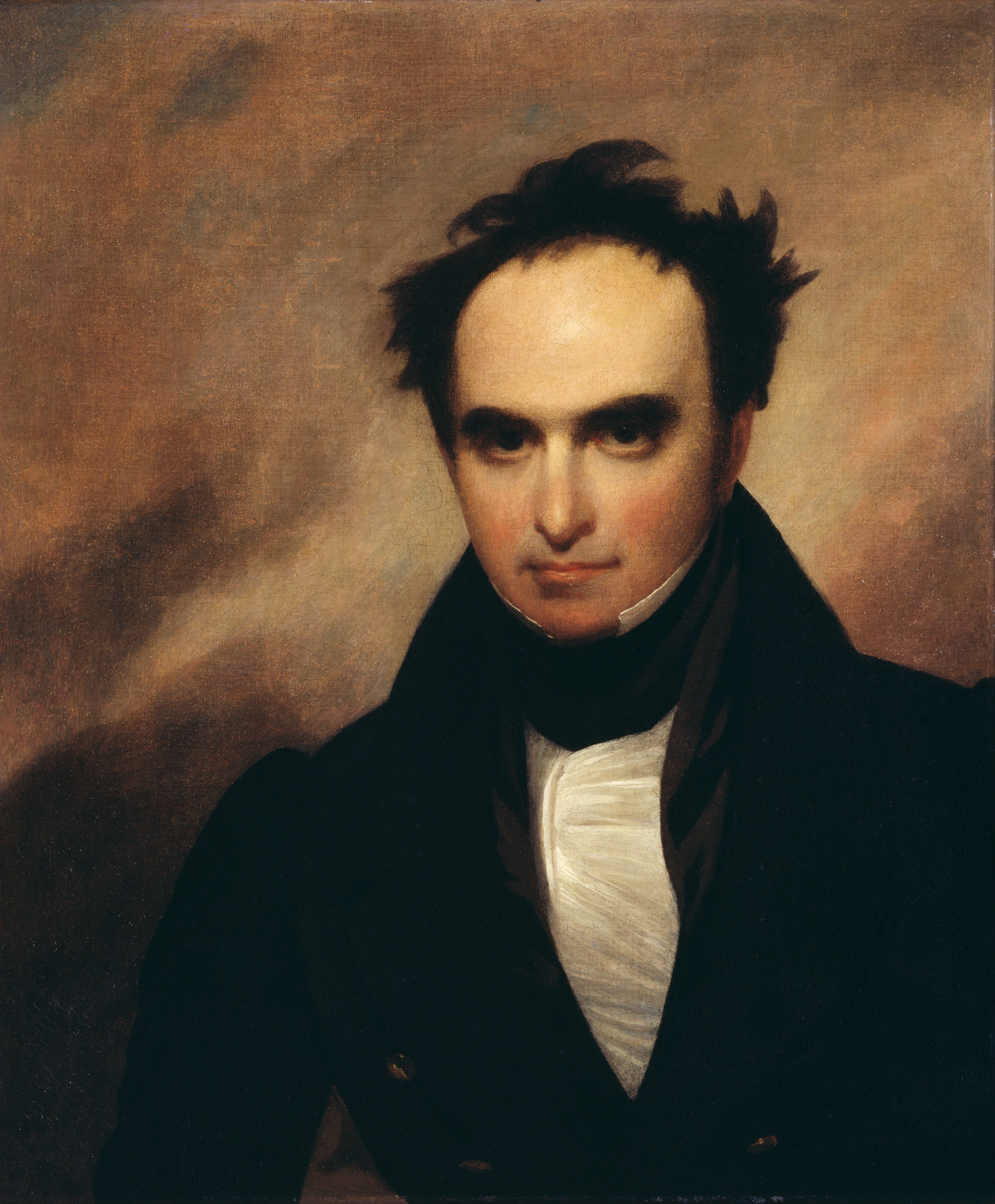
Daniel Webster, with whom Ashburton negotiated the Webster–Ashburton Treaty

In 1842, he was again sent to America, on a significant diplomatic mission, and the same year concluded the Webster–Ashburton Treaty, negotiated in the American federal national capital city of Washington, D.C., with United States Secretary of State Daniel Webster. A compromise was settled concerning the north-east boundary of the state of Maine with bordering provinces to the north of Nova Scotia, New Brunswick, and Quebec in neighboring Canada of British North America, plus other matters at issue remaining between the two governments of the extradition of certain criminals, which was arranged, and each state agreed to maintain a naval squadron of at least eighty guns onboard warships on the coast of West Africa for the suppression of the Atlantic slave trade, and the two governments then agreed to unite in a joint naval military effort to persuade other European powers to close all slave markets within their colonies.

Despite his earlier attitude, Lord Ashburton disapproved of Peel's free trade policies and opposed the Bank Charter Act 1844. Ashburton was a trustee of the British Museum and of the National Gallery, a privy councillor and DCL. He published, besides several speeches, An Enquiry into the Causes and Consequences of ... Orders in Council (1808), and The Financial and Commercial Crisis Considered (1847). Baring was the recipient of compensation under the Slave Compensation Act 1837. He received £10,090 in compensation for the emancipation of nearly 500 slaves spread across four slave plantations in British Guiana and Saint Kitts due to holding interests on those plantations.

== Personal life ==
On 23 August 1798, Ashburton married Ann Louisa Bingham (1782–1848), daughter of Ann Willing Bingham and William Bingham of Philadelphia, Pennsylvania, who served as a U.S. Senator and was one of the richest men in America, having made his fortune during the American Revolutionary War (1775–1783), through trading and ownership of privateers commerce raider warships. Her maternal grandfather was Thomas Willing (1731–1821), the president of the First Bank of the United States in Philadelphia, one of the most important American financial institutions of that time. Together, they had nine children:

- Bingham Baring, 2nd Baron Ashburton (1799–1864), who married Lady Harriet Mary Montagu, eldest daughter of George Montagu, 6th Earl of Sandwich.
- Francis Baring, 3rd Baron Ashburton (1800–1868), who married Hortense Maret (c. 1812–1882), daughter of Hugues-Bernard Maret, 1st Duke of Bassano, Prime Minister of France.
- Harriet Baring (1804–1892), married Henry Thynne, 3rd Marquess of Bath.
- Frederick Baring (1806–1868), Rector of Itchen Stoke, married Frederica Ashton on 24 April 1831.
- Anne Eugenia Baring (died 1839), married Humphrey St John-Mildmay.
- Alexander Baring (1810–1832), who died on board HMS Alfred in the Mediterranean.
- Arthur Baring (1818–1838), who died unmarried.
- Louisa Emily Baring (died 1888)
- Lydia Emily Baring (died 1868)

In 1830, Ashburton bought the country estate of Rudhall Manor in Herefordshire, England.

Lord Ashburton died at age 73 years old on 12 May 1848 at Longleat, in Wiltshire, England. His widowed wife Ann Louisa died seven months later on 5 December 1848.

=== Descendants ===
Through his eldest son, he was a grandfather of Mary Florence Baring (1860–1902), who married William Compton, 5th Marquess of Northampton. Through his second son, he was a grandfather of Alexander Baring, 4th Baron Ashburton (1835–1889), and Maria Anne Louisa Baring (1833–1928), who married William FitzRoy, 6th Duke of Grafton.

== Quotes ==
Of this great mercantile family the French Duke of Richelieu wittily remarked; "There are six main powers in Europe: Britain, France, Austria-Hungary, Russia, Prussia and the Baring-Brothers!" (Vicary Gibbs, from the "Complete Peerage" published 1910).

Parliament of the United Kingdom
Preceded by William Morland; John Hammet	Member of Parliament for Taunton; 1806–1826; With: John Hammet 1806–1811; Henry Powell Collins 1812–1818, 1819–1820; Sir William Burroughs, Bt 1818–1819; John Ashley Warre 1820–1826	Succeeded by Henry Seymour; William Peachey
Preceded by Matthias Attwood; William Thompson	Member of Parliament for Callington; 1826–1831; With: Matthias Attwood 1826–1830; Bingham Baring 1830–1831	Succeeded by Henry Bingham Baring; Edward Charles Hugh Herbert
Preceded by Lord James FitzRoy; Francis Baring	Member of Parliament for Thetford; 1831–1832; With: Lord James FitzRoy	Succeeded by Lord James FitzRoy; Francis Baring
New constituency	Member of Parliament for North Essex; 1832–1835; With: Sir John Tyrell, Bt	Succeeded by Sir John Tyrell, Bt; John Payne Elwes
Political offices
Preceded by Charles Poulett Thomson	President of the Board of Trade; 1834–1835	Succeeded by Charles Poulett Thomson
Preceded by James Abercromby	Master of the Mint; 1834–1835	Succeeded by Henry Labouchere
Peerage of the United Kingdom
New creation	Baron Ashburton; 2nd creation 1835–1848; Member of the House of Lords (1835–1848)	Succeeded by Bingham Baring
