= Bingham Baring, 2nd Baron Ashburton =

British politician

The Right Honourable The Lord Ashburton PC DL FRS
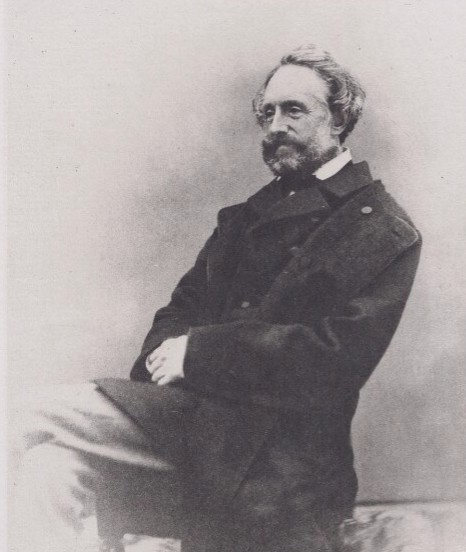

Member of the House of Lords
- Lord Temporal
- In office 12 May 1848 – 23 March 1864
- Preceded by: The 1st Baron Ashburton
- Succeeded by: The 3rd Baron Ashburton

Paymaster General
- In office 1 March 1845 – February 1846
- Monarch: Queen Victoria
- Prime Minister: Sir Robert Peel
- Preceded by: Sir Edward Knatchbull
- Succeeded by: Thomas Babington Macaulay

Personal details
- Born: June 1799 Philadelphia, Pennsylvania
- Died: 23 March 1864 (aged 64) The Grange, Hampshire
- Party: Whig (to 1837); Tory from 1837
- Spouse(s): (1) Lady Harriet Montagu m. 1823; d. 1857 (2) Louisa Stewart-Mackenzie m. 1858; wid. 1864
- Education: Oriel College, Oxford

William Bingham Baring, 2nd Baron Ashburton, PC, DL, FRS (June 1799 – 23 March 1864), was a British businessman and a Whig politician who later became a Tory.

== Background and education ==
William Bingham Baring was born in Philadelphia, Pennsylvania, in June 1799, the eldest son of the politician and banker Alexander Baring, 1st Baron Ashburton (1773–1848), and his wife Ann Louisa (died 1848), daughter of William Bingham. He was educated at Oriel College, Oxford, where he graduated in classics in 1821. He received a Master of Arts in 1836 and an Honorary Doctorate of Civil Law in 1856.

== Political career ==
Baring sat as Member of Parliament for Thetford between 1826 and 1830 and 1841 and 1848, for Callington between 1830 and 1831, for Winchester between 1832 and 1837, and for Staffordshire North between 1837 and 1841. He was elected as a Whig in 1832 and 1835, and from 1837 as a Tory. He served under Sir Robert Peel as Joint Secretary to the Board of Control from 1841 to 1845 and as Paymaster General, with a seat in the Cabinet, from 1845 to 1846. In 1845 he was sworn of the Privy Council. In 1848 he succeeded his father in the barony and entered the House of Lords.

Baring was a member of the Canterbury Association from 27 May 1848. He was a commandeur of the Légion d'honneur, awarded for his services to commerce. He served as captain in the Hampshire Yeomanry Cavalry. In 1853, he was appointed to be a Deputy Lieutenant of the County of Southampton. In 1854 he was elected a Fellow of the Royal Society. One of his on-going legacies is the National Rifle Association's competition for the Ashburton Shield which was donated by Lord Ashburton in 1861.

== Family ==
Lord Ashburton married as his first wife, Lady Harriet Mary Montagu, eldest daughter of George Montagu, 6th Earl of Sandwich, on 12 April 1823. Their only child, Alexander Montagu Baring (1828–1830), died as an infant. Lady Harriet is well known for inspiring the devotion of Thomas Carlyle, to the great dismay of his wife Jane Welsh Carlyle. Lady Harriet died on 4 May 1857, aged 51.

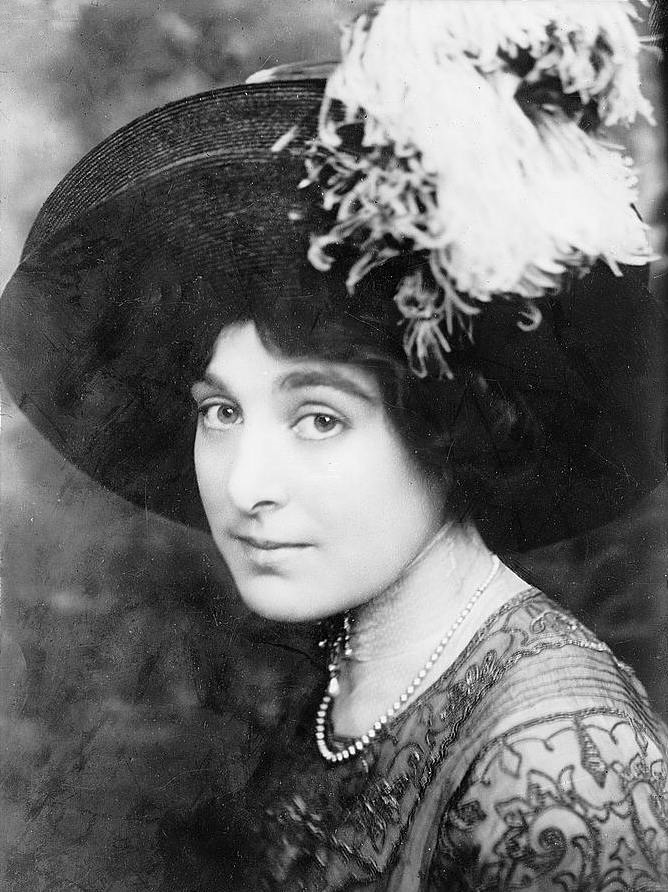
Lady Louisa Ashburton, Lord Ashburton's second wife

Lord Ashburton married as his second wife Louisa Caroline Stewart-Mackenzie, youngest daughter of James Alexander Stewart-Mackenzie, on 17 November 1858. They had one daughter, Mary Florence (named after Florence Nightingale), born on 26 June 1860 at Bath House, Piccadilly, London (a site now occupied by the Qualifications and Curriculum Authority), who married William Compton, 5th Marquess of Northampton. Lord Ashburton died at The Grange, Hertfordshire, in March 1864, aged 64.

He was succeeded in the barony by his younger brother Francis. Lady Ashburton subsequently had an intimate relationship with the sculptor Harriet Hosmer. Lady Ashburton died in London in February 1903, aged 75.

== Eponymous ==
The Ashburton River in New Zealand and the town of the same name located on the river were named by the chief surveyor of the Canterbury Association, Joseph Thomas, after Lord Ashburton.

== See also ==
- Baring family
- Baron Ashburton
- Barings Bank

Parliament of the United Kingdom
Preceded by Lord Charles FitzRoy; Nicholas Ridley-Colborne	Member of Parliament for Thetford; 1826–1830; With: Lord Charles FitzRoy	Succeeded by Lord James FitzRoy; Francis Baring
Preceded by Alexander Baring; Matthias Attwood	Member of Parliament for Callington; 1830–1831; With: Alexander Baring	Succeeded by Henry Bingham Baring; Edward Charles Hugh Herbert
Preceded by Paulet St John-Mildmay; James Buller East	Member of Parliament for Winchester; 1832–1837; With: Paulet St John-Mildmay 1832–1835; James Buller East 1835–1837	Succeeded by James Buller East; Paulet St John-Mildmay
Preceded by Sir Oswald Mosley, Bt; Edward Manningham-Buller	Member of Parliament for North Staffordshire; 1837–1841; With: Edward Manningham-Buller	Succeeded by Jesse David Watts Russell; Charles Adderley
Preceded by Francis Baring; The Earl of Euston	Member of Parliament for Thetford; 1841–1848; With: The Earl of Euston 1841–1842; Sir James Flower, Bt 1842–1847; Earl of Euston 1847–1848	Succeeded by Earl of Euston; Francis Baring
Political offices
Preceded by William Clay; Charles Buller	Secretary to the Board of Control with James Emerson Tennent; 1841–1845	Succeeded by Viscount Jocelyn; Viscount Mahon
Preceded by Sir Edward Knatchbull, Bt	Paymaster General; 1845–1846	Succeeded by Thomas Babington Macaulay
Peerage of the United Kingdom
Preceded by Alexander Baring	Baron Ashburton; 2nd creation 1848–1864; Member of the House of Lords (1848–1864)	Succeeded by Francis Baring
