= Listed buildings in Thrumpton =

Thrumpton is a civil parish in the Rushcliffe district of Nottinghamshire, England. The parish contains 21 listed buildings that are recorded in the National Heritage List for England. Of these, one is listed at Grade I, the highest of the three grades, one is at Grade II*, the middle grade, and the others are at Grade II, the lowest grade. The parish contains the village of Thrumpton and the surrounding area. The most important building in the parish is Thrumpton Hall, which is listed together with a number of associated structures. The other listed buildings are houses, cottages, farmhouses and farm buildings, a church, a font in the churchyard, and a railway tunnel portal.

== Key ==
Grade	Criteria
I	Buildings of exceptional interest, sometimes considered to be internationally important
II*	Particularly important buildings of more than special interest
II	Buildings of national importance and special interest

== Buildings ==
Name and location	Photograph	Date	Notes	Grade
All Saints Church; 52.87555°N 1.24415°W		13th century	The church has been altered and extended through the centuries, and in 1871 it was restored and partly rebuilt by G. E. Street. The church is built in stone and has tile roofs with decorative ridges. It consists of a nave, a chancel, a north organ chamber and vestry, and a west tower. The tower has two stages, a chamfered plinth, quoins, bands, lancet windows, two-light bell openings, and an embattled parapet.	II*
Font, All Saints Church; 52.87561°N 1.24392°W	—	13th century	The font in the churchyard to the north of the chancel is in stone. It has a tapering octagonal pedestal, and a circular bowl decorated with blind arcading.	II
Thrumpton Hall and outbuildings 52.87643°N 1.24785°W		1607–17	A country house that has been altered and extended through the centuries. It is in red brick on a chamfered stone plinth, with stone dressings, quoins, and tile roofs. There are two storeys, a cellar and attics, and an H-shaped plan with seven bays, the outer bays forming cross wings with gables decorated with horned pediments and orb finials. On the entrance and garden fronts are three-bay loggias, each with a balustraded parapet. On the left and recessed is a two-storey single-bay wing, behind which is a 17th-century wing. Projecting is a wing with two storeys and an attic and a single bay, and attached is the kitchen wing with a cupola on the roof, and a clock face in the gable apex. The attached outbuildings include a former ornamental dairy, and a service courtyard containing stables and a brewery.	I
Church House; 52.87572°N 1.24419°W		1713	The house is in brick, mainly with red stretchers and blue headers, on a plinth, with a chamfered blue brick band above it, a floor band, and a tile roof with decorative bargeboards and pendants. There are two storeys and two bays, a single bay on the right with two storeys and an attic, and a lean-to on the left. Steps lead up to the doorway, and the windows are casements, some with mullions, and some with quoined surrounds. In the south front is an oeil-de-boeuf, and the right gable contains an initialled and dated plaque.	II
Church Farmhouse; 52.87501°N 1.24293°W		Early 18th century	The farmhouse is in red brick, partly rendered, with dentilled eaves, and a tile roof with coped gables and kneelers. There are two storeys and three bays, the left bay projecting and gabled. The doorway has a hood, and the windows are tripartite casements with segmental heads.	II
The Garden House; 52.87508°N 1.24418°W		Early 18th century	The house, which was extended during the 19th century, is in brick, the original part with red stretcher and blue headers, and the extension completely in red brick. It has a stone plinth, a floor band, a raised eaves band and a tile roof. There are two storeys and attics, and three bays. On the front is a gabled porch, and the windows are tripartite casements, those in the ground floor under segmental heads.	II
The Manor House; 52.87682°N 1.24554°W	—	Early 18th century	The house, which was later extended, is in red brick, and has a roof of tile and slate with brick coped gabled and kneelers. There are two storeys and attics, an original range of six bays and a 19th-century projecting gabled bay on the right. The original part has a band in red and blue brick, and the extension has dogtooth eaves. Most of the windows are casements, in the original part is an oriel window, and the extension has a bay window. In the left gable wall is a stone plaque with an illegible inscription, and above it is blue brick diapering.	II
Yew Tree Cottage and The Cottage; 52.87625°N 1.24404°W	—	Early 18th century	A house divided into two cottages, it is in red brick with blue brick chequering, on a stone plinth, with a floor band, dentilled eaves, and a slate roof with coped gables and kneelers. The house has two storeys and attics, three bays, and a central doorway. There is one casement window in the upper floor, and the other windows are horizontally-sliding sashes. The ground floor windows have flush brick wedge lintels, and in the upper floor they are under segmental arches.	II
The Old Post Office; 52.87724°N 1.24361°W		1731	The cottage is in red brick, with a floor band of red and blue brick, dentilled eaves, and a roof of Swithland slate at the front and tile at the rear. There are two storeys and attics, a main range of three bays, a rear wing, and a two-storey rear extension. In the centre is a trellis porch flanked by casement windows, each with two pointed arched lights under segmental arches. In the attic are two half-dormers, gabled with bargeboards. Over the porch is an initialled and dated plaque.	II
Elm Cottage; 52.87718°N 1.24394°W		1735	The cottage is in red brick on a plinth, with a floor band of red and blue brick, dentilled eaves, and a tile roof with brick coped gables and kneelers. There are two storeys and three bays. On the front is a blocked doorway, casement windows in the ground floor, and sashes above. In the left gable end is a bay window, above which is a casement window, and in the apex is an initialled and dated plaque.	II
Hall Gates, Manor Cottage and wall 52.87706°N 1.24426°W		1735	A pair of cottages in red brick on a stone plinth, with a floor band of red and blue brick, dentilled eaves, and a tile roof with brick coped gables and kneelers. There is a single storey and attics, and six bays. In the middle is a projecting four-bay lean-to porch, with two doorways in the centre flanked by casement windows, and in the outer bays are horizontally-sliding sash windows. Above are four gabled dormers with bargeboards, containing casement windows under segmental arches. In the centre is an initialled and dated plaque, and to the right of the cottages is a brick wall with stone coping.	II
Barn and outbuilding, Thrumpton House; 52.87578°N 1.24448°W		Late 18th century	The barn and outbuilding are in red brick, with dentilled eaves, and tile roofs with brick coped gables and kneelers. The barn has a single storey and a loft and no openings, and the outbuilding on the left has a single storey and two bays, and contains a segmental-arched opening and a blocked doorway.	II
Ice House; 52.87465°N 1.24901°W		Late 18th century	The ice house in the grounds of Thrumpton Hall is in red brick. It has a round-arched entrance opening into a short passage which leads to the domed brick chamber.	II
Pair of gate piers (east); 52.87549°N 1.24453°W	—	Late 18th century	The pair of gate piers is at the entrance to the grounds of Thrumpton Hall. The piers are in red brick, with stone quoins and moulded coping.	II
Pair of gate piers (west); 52.87557°N 1.24647°W	—	Late 18th century	The pair of gate piers is in the grounds of Thrumpton Hall. The piers are in stone, and each pier has moulded coping and an orb finial.	II
Barn, Thrumpton House; 52.87576°N 1.24485°W		Early 19th century	The barn is in red brick, with some stone, and a tile roof with brick coped gables and kneelers. There are two storeys and six bays. The barn contains a large basket archway, lozenge-shaped ventilators, and a blocked doorway containing a smaller basket-arched doorway.	II
Laburnum Cottage; 52.87665°N 1.24400°W		1828	The cottage is in red brick on a stone plinth, with a floor band, dentilled eaves, and a slate roof with decorative bargeboards and pendant finials. There are two storeys and three bays. The windows are sashes, and in the right gable is an initialled and dated plaque.	II
East Gateway; 52.87709°N 1.24624°W	—	c. 1830	The gateway is in red brick with stone dressings, on a plinth, and it consists of a moulded Tudor archway. On the west side are buttresses, and on the east side is a dogtooth hood mould. Above the arch is a stone coped parapet with mock machicolations.	II
West Gateway; 52.87673°N 1.24767°W	—	c. 1830	The gateway is in red brick with stone dressings, on a plinth, and it consists of a moulded Tudor archway with panelled spandrels. On each side are buttresses with gabled finials decorated with blind trefoil-arched panels. The stone parapet rises to include a coat of arms, and on the west side is a dogtooth band. To the south is a red brick wall.	II
Gatehouse and Gatehouse Cottage; 52.87719°N 1.24422°W		c. 1830	The gatehouse and cottage are in red brick, and contains a gateway with a moulded Tudor arch. This is flanked by octagonal panelled turrets on moulded plinths, corbelled out at the top, and embattled. Over the arch is a hood mould that rises over a carved shield, above which is a three-light mullioned window flanked by lozenge panels in blue brick, and at the top is an embattled parapet. To the right is a brick wall with stone coping, and to the left is a single-storey single-bay cottage. This has a plinth, an embattled parapet, a tile roof hipped on the left, and it contains a four-light mullioned window.	II
North Portal, Redhill Tunnel; 52.87206°N 1.26554°W		1840	A pair of tunnel entrances. The east tunnel, built by the Midland Counties Railway, is the older, and the west tunnel was built in 1875 by the Midland Railway. The east portal has an embattled and machicolated parapet. To its left is an octagonal embattled turret with a corbel table, containing a slit vent. To the right is a smaller circular turret, and on each sided are embattled walls. The later west portal is similar.	II
