= Thetford (constituency) =

Parliamentary constituency in the United Kingdom, 1801–1868

- Former borough constituency for the House of Commons
- County: Norfolk

1529–1868
- Seats: Two
- Replaced by: West Norfolk

Thetford was a constituency of the British House of Commons. It elected two Members of Parliament (MPs) by the bloc vote system of election. It was disenfranchised under the Representation of the People (Scotland) Act 1868, which had resulted in a net increase of seven seats in Scotland, offset by the disenfranchisement of seven English Boroughs.

Below are those MPs who held the seat from just prior to the Restoration onwards.

== Members of Parliament ==
=== MPs 1529–1660 ===
Year	First member	Second member
1529	Giles Heron	William Dauntesey (or Daunce)
1536	?	
1539	?	
1542	?	
1545	?	
1547	John Brende	Richard Heydon
1553 (Mar)	Sir John Clere	Henry Northey
1553 (Oct)	William Hunston	Robert Drury
1554 (Apr)	Robert Drury	Nicholas Rookwood
1554 (Nov)	Robert Drury	Nicholas Rookwood
1555	Nicholas Rookwood	Robert Barker
1558	Edward Clere	Walter Haddon
1559	Edmund Gascoigne	Thomas Poley I
1562–3	Sir Richard Fulmerston	Edward Clere
1571	Philip Appleyard	Thomas Hogan
1572	William Humberston, died and repl. Jan 1576 by Sir Valentine Browne	Thomas Colby
1584	Edward Eden	Robert Whitney
1586	Sir Roger Woodhouse	Thomas Poley II
1588–9	William Waad	Philip Gawdy
1593	Charles Chewte	Bassingbourne Gawdy
1597	John Crofts	Philip Gawdy
1601	Henry Warner	Thomas Knyvet, 1st Baron Knyvet
1604	Bassingbourne Gawdy died and repl. 1606 by Sir William Twysden, 1st Baronet	Sir William Paddy
1614	Framlingham Gawdy	Sir William Twysden, 1st Baronet
1621	Framlingham Gawdy	Sir Thomas Holland
1624	Framlingham Gawdy	Drue Drury
1625	Sir Robert Cotton, 1st Baronet, of Connington	Framlingham Gawdy
1626	Sir John Hobart, 2nd Baronet	Framlingham Gawdy
1628	Edmund Moundeford	Sir Henry Spiller sat for Middlesex and repl.by Sir Henry Vane
1629–1640	No Parliaments summoned	
Apr 1640	Sir Thomas Wodehouse, 2nd Baronet	Framlingham Gawdy
Nov 1640	Sir Thomas Wodehouse, 2nd Baronet	Framlingham Gawdy secluded 1648
1648	Sir Thomas Wodehouse, 2nd Baronet	
1653–1658	Thetford not represented in Barebones and Protectorate Parliaments	
1659	William Stene	Robert Steward

=== MPs 1660–1868 ===
Year	First member	First party	Second member	Second party
April 1660	Sir Philip Wodehouse		Robert Paston	
March 1661	Sir Allen Apsley		William Gawdy	
October 1669	Sir Allen Apsley		Sir Joseph Williamson	
February 1679	William Harbord		Sir Joseph Williamson	
March 1685	Henry Heveningham		William de Grey	
January 1689	Sir Henry Hobart	Whig	William Harbord	
February 1689	Sir Francis Guybon		William Harbord	
June 1689	Sir Francis Guybon		John Trenchard	Whig
February 1690	Sir Francis Guybon		William Harbord	
May 1690	Sir Francis Guybon		Baptist May	
November 1695	Sir Joseph Williamson		Sir John Wodehouse	
January 1696	James Sloane	Whig	Sir John Wodehouse	
July 1698	James Sloane	Whig	Sir Joseph Williamson	
January 1699	James Sloane	Whig	Lord Paston	
January 1701	Sir Joseph Williamson		Edmund Soame	
March 1701	Sir Thomas Hanmer		Edmund Soame	
November 1701	Sir Thomas Hanmer		Sir John Wodehouse	
July 1702	Robert Benson		Edmund Soame	
May 1705	Sir Thomas Hanmer		Sir John Wodehouse	
May 1708	Robert Baylis		Thomas de Grey	
October 1710	Sir Thomas Hanmer		Dudley North	
December 1710	Sir Edmund Bacon		Dudley North	
August 1713	Sir William Barker	Tory	Dudley North	
January 1715	John Ward		Dudley North	
1722	Sir Edmund Bacon	Tory	Robert Jacomb	
1733 by-election	Sir Edmund Bacon	Tory	Charles FitzRoy-Scudamore	
1739 by-election	Lord Augustus FitzRoy		Charles FitzRoy-Scudamore	
Dec. 1741 by-election	Lord Henry Beauclerk	Whig	Charles FitzRoy-Scudamore	
1754	Lord Henry Beauclerk	Whig	Herbert Westfaling	
1761	Henry Seymour Conway	Rockingham Whig	Hon. Aubrey Beauclerk	
1768	Henry Seymour Conway	Rockingham Whig	John Drummond	
Sept. 1774 by-election	Henry Seymour Conway	Rockingham Whig	Viscount Petersham	
1774	Hon. Charles FitzRoy		Charles FitzRoy-Scudamore	
1780	Richard Hopkins		Charles FitzRoy-Scudamore	
1782 by-election	Richard Hopkins		Earl of Euston	Whig
1784	Sir Charles Kent, Bt		George Jennings	
1790	Robert John Buxton		Joseph Randyll Burch	
May 1796	John Harrison		Joseph Randyll Burch	
1802	John Harrison		Thomas Creevey	
1806	Lord William FitzRoy		James Mingay	
February 1807	Lord William FitzRoy		Thomas Creevey	
1812	Lord John FitzRoy		Thomas Creevey	
1818	Lord Charles FitzRoy	Whig	Nicholas Ridley-Colborne	
1826	Lord Charles FitzRoy	Whig	Bingham Baring	Whig
1830	Lord James FitzRoy	Whig	Francis Baring	Whig
1831	Lord James FitzRoy	Whig	Alexander Baring	Tory
1832	Lord James FitzRoy	Whig	Francis Baring	Tory
August 1834 by-election	Henry FitzRoy, Earl of Euston	Whig	Francis Baring	Tory
December 1834	Henry FitzRoy, Earl of Euston	Whig	Francis Baring	Conservative
1841	Henry FitzRoy, Earl of Euston	Whig	Hon. Bingham Baring	Conservative
May 1842	Sir James Flower, Bt	Conservative	Hon. Bingham Baring	Conservative
1847	William FitzRoy, Earl of Euston	Whig	Hon. Bingham Baring	Conservative
1848 by-election	William FitzRoy, Earl of Euston	Whig	Francis Baring	Conservative
1857 by-election	William FitzRoy, Earl of Euston	Whig	Alexander Baring	Conservative
1859	William FitzRoy, Earl of Euston	Liberal	Alexander Baring	Conservative
1863 by-election	Lord Frederick FitzRoy	Liberal	Alexander Baring	Conservative
1865	Robert Harvey	Conservative	Alexander Baring	Conservative
1867 by-election	Robert Harvey	Conservative	Edward Gordon	Conservative
1868	Constituency abolished			

== FitzRoy family ==
Due to the town's close proximity to Euston Hall (the main residence of the FitzRoy family), the seat for Thetford has been held by various members of the family:

- 1733-54 & 1774-82: Charles FitzRoy-Scudamore
- 1739-41: Lord Augustus FitzRoy
- 1774-80: Hon. Charles FitzRoy
- 1782-84: George FitzRoy, Earl of Euston
- 1806-12: Lord William FitzRoy
- 1812-18: Lord John FitzRoy
- 1818-30: Lord Charles FitzRoy
- 1830-34: Lord James FitzRoy
- 1847-63: William FitzRoy, Earl of Euston
- 1863-65: Lord Frederick FitzRoy

== Election results ==
=== Elections in the 1830s ===
General election 1830: Thetford
Party	Candidate	Votes	%
Whig	Lord James FitzRoy	Unopposed	
Whig	Francis Baring	Unopposed	
Registered electors		31	
Whig hold			
Whig hold			

General election 1831: Thetford
Party	Candidate	Votes	%
Whig	Lord James FitzRoy	Unopposed	
Tory	Alexander Baring	Unopposed	
Registered electors		31	
Whig hold			
Tory gain from Whig			

General election 1832: Thetford
Party	Candidate	Votes	%
Whig	Lord James FitzRoy	Unopposed	
Tory	Francis Baring	Unopposed	
Registered electors		146	
Whig hold			
Tory hold			

FitzRoy's death caused a by-election.

By-election, 8 August 1834: Thetford
Party	Candidate	Votes	%
Whig	Henry FitzRoy	Unopposed	
Whig hold			

General election 1835: Thetford
Party	Candidate	Votes	%
Whig	Henry FitzRoy	Unopposed	
Conservative	Francis Baring	Unopposed	
Registered electors		160	
Whig hold			
Conservative hold			

General election 1837: Thetford
Party	Candidate	Votes	%
Whig	Henry FitzRoy	Unopposed	
Conservative	Francis Baring	Unopposed	
Registered electors		161	
Whig hold			
Conservative hold			

=== Elections in the 1840s ===
General election 1841: Thetford
Party	Candidate	Votes	%	±%
Conservative	Bingham Baring	86	37.7	N/A
Whig	Henry FitzRoy	71	31.1	N/A
Conservative	James Flower	71	31.1	N/A
Turnout		137	87.8	N/A
Registered electors		156		
Majority		15	6.6	N/A
Conservative hold		Swing	N/A	
Majority		0	0.0	N/A
Whig hold		Swing	N/A	
Conservative win				

Due to the triple return, on petition, one vote was knocked off FitzRoy's total and Flower was declared elected in 1842.

Baring was appointed Paymaster General, requiring a by-election.

By-election, 24 February 1845: Thetford
Party	Candidate	Votes	%	±%
Conservative	Bingham Baring	Unopposed		
Conservative hold				

General election 1847: Thetford
Party	Candidate	Votes	%	±%
Conservative	Bingham Baring	Unopposed		
Whig	William FitzRoy	Unopposed		
Registered electors		200		
Conservative hold				
Whig hold				

Baring succeeded to the peerage, becoming 2nd Baron Ashburton and causing a by-election.

By-election, 3 August 1848: Thetford
Party	Candidate	Votes	%	±%
Conservative	Francis Baring	Unopposed		
Conservative hold				

=== Elections in the 1850s ===
General election 1852: Thetford
Party	Candidate	Votes	%	±%
Conservative	Francis Baring	Unopposed		
Whig	William FitzRoy	Unopposed		
Registered electors		200		
Conservative hold				
Whig hold				

General election 1857: Thetford
Party	Candidate	Votes	%	±%
Conservative	Francis Baring	Unopposed		
Whig	William FitzRoy	Unopposed		
Registered electors		218		
Conservative hold				
Whig hold				

Baring resigned, causing a by-election.

By-election, 9 December 1857: Thetford
Party	Candidate	Votes	%	±%
Conservative	Alexander Baring	Unopposed		
Conservative hold				

General election 1859: Thetford
Party	Candidate	Votes	%	±%
Conservative	Alexander Baring	Unopposed		
Liberal	William FitzRoy	Unopposed		
Registered electors		231		
Conservative hold				
Liberal hold				

=== Elections in the 1860s ===
FitzRoy succeeded to the peerage, becoming 6th Duke of Grafton and causing a by-election.

By-election, 21 April 1863: Thetford
Party	Candidate	Votes	%	±%
Liberal	Lord Frederick FitzRoy	93	53.4	N/A
Conservative	Robert Harvey	81	46.6	N/A
Majority		12	6.8	N/A
Turnout		174	75.0	N/A
Registered electors		232		
Liberal hold		Swing	N/A	

General election 1865: Thetford
Party	Candidate	Votes	%	±%
Conservative	Robert Harvey	193	48.4	N/A
Liberal	Alexander Baring	137	34.3	N/A
Liberal	Thomas Dakin	69	17.3	N/A
Majority		124	31.1	N/A
Turnout		200 (est)	89.1 (est)	N/A
Registered electors		224		
Conservative gain from Liberal		Swing	N/A	
Liberal hold		Swing	N/A	

Baring resigned, causing a by-election.

By-election, 2 December 1867: Thetford
Party	Candidate	Votes	%	±%
Conservative	Edward Gordon	Unopposed		
Conservative gain from Liberal				

== Sources ==
- D. Brunton & D. H. Pennington, Members of the Long Parliament (London: George Allen & Unwin, 1954)
- Cobbett's Parliamentary history of England, from the Norman Conquest in 1066 to the year 1803 (London: Thomas Hansard, 1808)
