= Elizabeth Douglas Van Buren =

British Classical and Near-eastern archaeologist

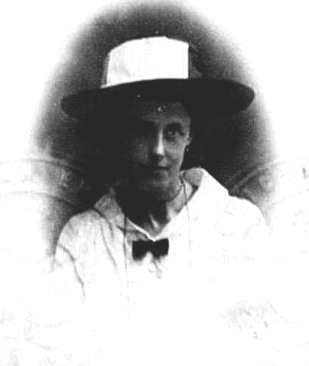
- Born: Elizabeth Douglas; 18 October 1881; London, England
- Died: 5 September 1961 (aged 79); Rome, Italy
- Occupation: Archaeologist
- Spouse: Albert William Van Buren (m. 1914)

Academic background
- Education: University of Cambridge

Academic work
- Institutions: British School at Rome

Elizabeth Douglas Van Buren (birth name Elizabeth Douglas; 18 October 1881 – 5 September 1961) was a British Classical and Near-eastern archaeologist.

== Early life and education ==
Elizabeth was born in London in 1881 to John Archibald Douglas and Mary Anne McLachlan. She studied at Girton College, University of Cambridge. She was a member of the British School at Rome from 1909 to 1911.

== Career ==
She studied art history and archaeology and subsequently went to Rome for research. There she married the American archaeologist Albert William Van Buren (1878–1968) on 19 August 1914, who had worked at the American School of Classical Studies, and later at the American Academy in Rome.

Van Buren initially specialized in ancient terracottas used as siding for archaic buildings in Italy and Greece. Later she turned to the figurative art of Mesopotamia as a research focus. Van Buren was a corresponding member of the German Archaeological Institute, and was elected member of the Society for the Promotion of Hellenic Studies.

She was noted for her contributions on excavations in Warka to Iraq. Her numerous publications on artefacts and iconography from Mesopotamia were described as "indispensable works of reference". In total she produced 66 publications in the subject of Near Eastern studies, and 18 publications in the areas of Greek, Etruscan and Roman archaeology.

Elizabeth died in 1961, and was buried in the Parte Antica of the Protestant Cemetery, Rome.

== Works ==
- Figurative Terra-cotta Revetments in Etruria and Latium in the VI. and V. Centuries B.C. London 1921 Full text.
- Archaic fictile revetments in Sicily and Magna Graecia. New York 1923 Full text.
- Greek Fictile Revetments in the Archaic Period. London 1926.
- Clay Figurines of Babylonia and Assyria. New Haven/Oxford 1931 (Yale Oriental Researches 26).
- Foundation Figurines and Offerings. Berlin 1931 Full text (PDF; 10,9 MB).
- The Flowing Vase and the God with Streams. Berlin 1933.
- The Fauna of Ancient Mesopotamia as Represented in Art. Rome 1939.
- "The Rosette in Mesopotamian Art". In: Zeitschrift für Assyriologie. 45, 1939, p. 99–107.
- The Cylinder Seals of the Pontifical Biblical Institute. Rome 1940 (Analecta Orientalia 21).
- Symbols of the Gods in Mesopotamian Art. Rome 1945.
- "The Dragon in Ancient Mesopotamia". In: Orientalia. 15, 1946, p. 1–45.
