= Albert William Van Buren =

American classicist, professor, and librarian

Albert William Van Buren (February 17, 1878 Milford, Connecticut - February 4, 1968) was an American classicist, professor, and librarian. He had expertise in Roman epigraphy, numismatics, and bibliography. He was awarded a prize in Classical Studies and Archaeology by the American Academy in Rome in 1906. Van Buren earned a B.A. in 1900 and a PhD in 1915 from Yale University.

== Early life and career ==
Albert William Van Buren was born in Milford, Connecticut, and was an American classicist, professor, and librarian.

Van Buren was an instructor at Yale University between 1906 and 1908. He served as a librarian at the American School of Classical Studies in Rome from 1908 to 1926. He also worked as a lecturer, for the same institution between 1908 and 1911.

He married the British Classical and Near-eastern archaeologist Elizabeth Douglas on 19 August 1914.

He subsequently became an Associate Professor of Archaeology (1911–23), Professor (1923–46), and eventually as Editor in Chief and Curator of the American Academy in Rome collections (1926–46). He was awarded a gold medal by the American Academy in Rome in 1962.

He had expertise in Roman epigraphy, numismatics, and bibliography. He was awarded a prize in Classical Studies and Archaeology by the American Academy in Rome in 1906.

== Fellowships, honors and awards ==
- Royal Numismatics Society, London
- Society for the Promotion of Hellenic Studies
- German Archaeological Institute
- Pontificia Accademia Romana di Archeologia
- Pontificia Insigne Accademia di Belle Arti e Letteratura dei Virtuosi al Pantheon, Honorary Member
- Keats-Shelley Memorial Association

== Publications ==
- Van Buren, A. W., 1907. 'Inscription of the Charioteer Menander.' American Journal of Archaeology 11: 179-81.
- Van Buren, A. W., 1908. 'The Palimpsest of Cicero's "De Re Publica": A Transcription, with Introduction.' Supplementary Papers of the American School of Classical Studies in Rome 2: 84-262.
- Van Buren, A. W., 1912. 'Inscriptions from Rome.' American Journal of Archaeology 16: 97-100.
- Van Buren, A. W., 1912-13. 'The Geography of Ancient Italy.' Classical Journal 8: 286-92, 327-40.
- Van Buren, A. W., 1913. 'The Ara Pacis Augustae.' Journal of Roman Studies 3: 134-41.
- Van Buren, A. W., 1918. 'Studies in the Archaeology of the Forum at Pompei.' Memoirs of the American Academy in Rome 2: 67-76.
- Van Buren, A. W., 1925. 'Further Studies in Pompeian Archaeology.' Memoirs of the American Academy in Rome 5: 103-13.
- Van Buren, A. W., 1926. 'Epigraphical Salvage from Pompeii.' American Journal of Philology 47: 177-79.
- Van Buren, A. W., 1926-42. 'Annual "News Items from Rome." American Journal of Archaeology 30-46: 1926-42.
- Van Buren, A. W., with Sir James George Frazer, ed., 1930. Graecia Antiqua, Maps and Plans to Illustrate Pausania's Description of Greece. London.
- Van Buren, A. W., 1933. 'Antiquities of the Janiculum.' Memoirs of the American Academy in Rome 11: 69-79.
- Van Buren, A. W., 1936. Ancient Rome as Revealed by Recent Discoveries. London.
- Van Buren, A. W., 1938. 'Pinocothecae, with Special Reference to Pompeii.' Memoirs of the American Academy in Rome 15: 70-81.
- Van Buren, A. W., 1944. 'Laurentinum Plinii Minoris (Ep. II, 17).' Rendiconti della Pontificia Accademia Romana di Archeologia 20: 166-92.
- Van Buren, A. W., 1948-52. 'Annual "News from Italy.' American Journal of Archaeology 52-56.
- Van Buren, A. W., 1953. A Bibliographical Guide to Latium and Southern Etruria, 5th edition. Rome.
- Van Buren, A. W., 1953-70. 'Annual "News Letter from Rome.' American Journal of Archaeology 57-70.
- Van Buren, A. W., 1956. 'Alcune osservazioni riguardanti materiale pompeiano.' Rendiconti della Pontificia Accademia Romana di Archeologia 28: 31-43.
