= Thomas Hogan (MP) =

16th-century English politician

Thomas Hogan, Huggen or Huggins (by 1521 – 7 March 1586), of East Bradenham, Norfolk, was an English politician.

He was the eldest son of Robert Hogan of East Bradenham and was educated at Trinity Hall, Cambridge (c. 1534) and admitted to Lincoln's Inn in 1539. He succeeded his father in 1547.

He was elected a member of parliament (MP) for New Shoreham in 1555, for King's Lynn in 1559, and for Thetford in 1571. He was a justice of the peace for Norfolk from 1569 until his death and was appointed High Sheriff of Norfolk for 1585–86, dying in office in March 1586.

He married twice; firstly Susan, with whom he had 2 sons and 2 daughters and secondly Anne, the daughter of Mr. Goddard.
