= George Byron, 8th Baron Byron =

British nobleman, army officer, peer and politician

Captain The Right Honourable The Lord Byron

Member of the House of Lords Lord Temporal
- In office 1 March 1868 – 28 November 1870; Hereditary peerage
- Preceded by: The 7th Baron Byron
- Succeeded by: The 9th Baron Byron

Personal details
- Born: 30 June 1818
- Died: 28 November 1870 (aged 52)
- Spouse: Lucy Elizabeth Jane Wescomb
- Parent(s): George Byron, 7th Baron Byron; Elizabeth Mary Chandos-Pole

Captain George Anson Byron, 8th Baron Byron (30 June 1818 – 28 November 1870) was a British nobleman, army officer, peer, politician, and the eighth Baron Byron, as the son of Admiral George Anson Byron, 7th Baron Byron, who was the cousin of Romantic poet and writer George Gordon Byron, 6th Baron Byron.

== Early life ==
Byron was the son of Admiral George Anson Byron, 7th Baron Byron and Elizabeth Mary Chandos-Pole.

== Career ==
He gained the rank of captain in the 19th Foot in 1842. He succeeded to the title of 8th Baron Byron in 1868 upon the death of his father.

== Personal life ==
In 1843, Lord Byron was married to Lucy Elizabeth Jane Wescomb, a daughter of the Rev. William Wescomb and Jane Douglas (a granddaughter of Archibald Douglas, MP). Lucy's sister, Mary Jane Wescomb, married his younger brother, Hon. Frederick Byron. Another sister, Catherine Sarah Wilhelimna Wescomb, married Lord Frederick FitzRoy (youngest son of the 5th Duke of Grafton).

Lord Byron died on 28 November 1870. As he had no children, he was succeeded by his nephew, George Frederick William Byron, 9th Baron Byron (born 1855).

=== Arms ===
Coat of arms of George Byron, 8th Baron Byron
Coronet A Coronet of a Baron Crest A Mermaid proper Escutcheon Argent three Bendlets enhanced Gules Supporters On either side a Horse of a brown bay colour unguled Or Motto Crede Byron (Trust Byron)

Peerage of England
Preceded by George Anson Byron	Baron Byron; 1868–1870	Succeeded by George Byron
