= William FitzRoy, 6th Duke of Grafton =

British peer, soldier and politician (1819–1882)

His Grace The Duke of Grafton
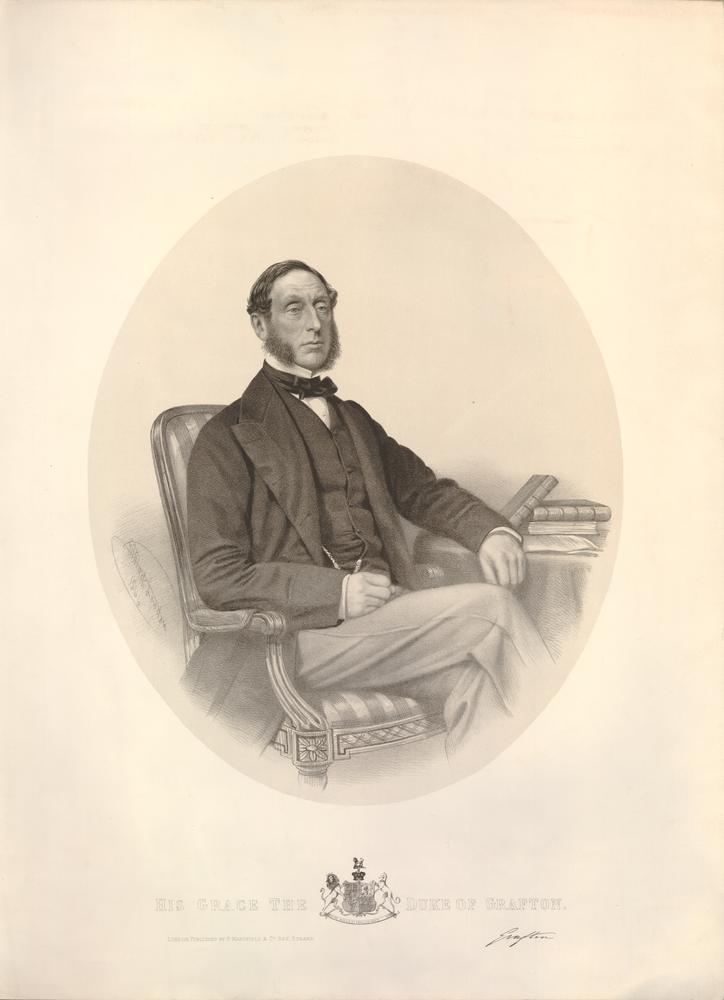

Member of Parliament for Thetford
- In office 1847–1863 Serving with Hon. William Baring, Francis Baring, Alexander Baring
- Preceded by: Hon. William Baring; Sir James Flower
- Succeeded by: Alexander Baring; Lord Frederick FitzRoy

Personal details
- Born: William Henry FitzRoy; 5 August 1819 Middlesex, England
- Died: 21 May 1882 (aged 62) London, England
- Spouse: The Hon. Marie Baring (m. 1858; died 1882)
- Parent(s): Henry FitzRoy, 5th Duke of Grafton; Mary Caroline Berkeley

Arms of the Duke of Grafton

William Henry Fitzroy, 6th Duke of Grafton (5 August 1819 – 21 May 1882), styled Viscount Ipswich until 1847 and Earl of Euston between 1847 and 1863, was a British peer and Liberal Party politician. He was born in London and educated at Harrow, and after went to the Royal Military College, Sandhurst.

== Early life ==
He was the eldest son of Henry FitzRoy, 5th Duke of Grafton and his wife Mary Caroline Berkeley, who were married on 20 June 1812 in Lisbon. At the time his father was an officer fighting with the Duke of Wellington in the Peninsular War.

== Career ==
At the 1847 general election, he was elected unopposed as a Member of Parliament (MP) for the borough of Thetford in Norfolk, a seat held by his father from 1834 to 1841. He was returned unopposed at the next three general elections, and held the seat until he succeeded to his father's peerage in 1863. As well as the titles, he inherited almost 26,000 acres.

In 1860, he was appointed lieutenant-colonel in command of the 1st Administrative Battalion of the Northamptonshire Rifle Volunteers.

== Personal life ==
=== Marriage ===
On 10 February 1858, Grafton married the Hon. Marie Anne Louise Baring (1833–1928), the daughter of Francis Baring, 3rd Baron Ashburton and Claire Hortense Maret (a daughter of the former Prime Minister of France, Hugues-Bernard Maret, 1st Duke of Bassano). He spent the winter and spring each year at Hyères because he and his wife both suffered from ill health.

The Duke and Duchess' London residence was No. 4 Grosvenor Place, Belgravia from April 1874.

=== Death ===
He died childless in 1882, aged 62, in London and was succeeded as Duke of Grafton by his younger brother, Augustus. His widow died on 8 April 1928.

=== Estate ===
In August 1882 probate of the Duke's will was granted to his brother and successor Augustus FitzRoy, 7th Duke of Grafton; his personal estate was valued at approximately £156,000.

In his will he made generous provision for his widow Marie Anne Louise, Dowager Duchess of Grafton, including:

- A life interest in the leasehold of his London townhouse at No. 4 Grosvenor Place, including its stables, pictures, furniture and other contents;
- £26,000 outright; and,
- An annuity for life of £4,000, charged on the family estates, in addition to the income she was entitled to under the terms of their marriage settlement.

In his will he also provided his widow with an alternative arrangement which she could elect to receive; this included a life-interest in the Euston estate, a life annuity of £1,000 charged on the Honour of Grafton estates, and an outright sum of £2,000, which would also be paid in addition to the income payable to her under their marriage settlement.

His bequeathed a life interest in his Grafton and Euston estates to his brother Augustus FitzRoy, 7th Duke of Grafton, subject to his widow's life interests, along with the right to choose who would inherit the estates after his own death. The 7th Duke also inherited his brother's residuary real and personal estate.

Under the terms of his will the 6th Duke also stipulated that his London properties in Clarges Street and Half Moon Street were to be sold and the proceeds settled on similar terms to the Grafton and Euston estates.

== Arms ==
Coat of arms of William FitzRoy, 6th Duke of Grafton
Coronet The coronet of a Duke Crest On a Chapeau Gules turned up Ermine a Lion statant guardant Or ducally crowned Azure and gorged with a Collar counter-compony Argent and of the fourth. Escutcheon The Royal Arms of Charles II, viz Quarterly: 1st and 4th, France and England quarterly; 2nd, Scotland; 3rd, Ireland; the whole debruised by a Baton sinister compony of six pieces Argent and Azure Supporters Dexter: a Lion guardant Or ducally crowned Azure; Sinister: a Greyhound Argent, each gorged with a Collar counter-compony Argent and Azure. Motto Et Decus Et Pretium Recti (The ornament and recompense of virtue)

Parliament of the United Kingdom
Preceded by Hon. William Baring; Sir James Flower	Member of Parliament for Thetford; 1847–1863; With: Hon. William Baring 1847–1848; Francis Baring 1848–1857; Alexander Baring 1857–1863	Succeeded by Alexander Baring; Lord Frederick FitzRoy
Peerage of England
Preceded by Henry FitzRoy	Duke of Grafton; 1863–1882	Succeeded by Augustus FitzRoy
