= Thrumpton =

Village and civil parish in Nottinghamshire, England

Coordinates: 52.875°N 1.244°W

- Village and civil parish
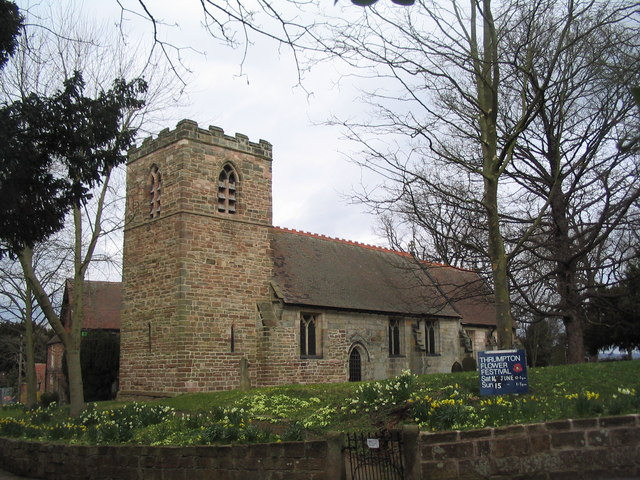
- Church of All Saints, Thrumpton

- Location within Nottinghamshire
- Interactive map of Thrumpton
- Area: 1.58 sq mi (4.1 km^{2})
- Population: 178 (2021)
  - Density: 113/sq mi (44/km^{2})
- OS grid reference: SK 516309
  - London: 105 mi (169 km) SSE
- District: Rushcliffe
- Shire county: Nottinghamshire
- Region: East Midlands
- Country: England
- Sovereign state: United Kingdom
- Post town: NOTTINGHAM
- Postcode district: NG11
- Dialling code: 0115
- Police: Nottinghamshire
- Fire: Nottinghamshire
- Ambulance: East Midlands
- UK Parliament: Rushcliffe
- Website: www.thrumpton.org.uk/

Thrumpton is a village and civil parish in Nottinghamshire, England. At the time of the 2001 census it had a population of 152, increasing to 165 at the 2011 census, and 178 at the 2021 census. It is located on the A453 road 6 miles (9.7 km) south-west of West Bridgford. The 13th century Church of All Saints is Grade II* listed and was restored in 1871. Many of the gabled brick houses in the village were built between 1700 and 1745 by John Emerton of Thrumpton Hall.

== See also ==
- Listed buildings in Thrumpton
