= Frederick Byron, 10th Baron Byron =

British Baron (1861–1949)

The Reverend and Right Honourable The Lord Byron

Member of the House of Lords Lord Temporal
- In office 30 March 1917 – 6 June 1949; Hereditary peerage
- Preceded by: The 9th Baron Byron
- Succeeded by: The 11th Baron Byron

Personal details
- Born: 26 March 1861
- Died: 6 June 1949 (age 88)
- Spouse: Anna Ismay Ethel FitzRoy
- Parent(s): Hon. Frederick Byron; Mary Jane Wescomb

Reverend Frederick Ernest Charles Byron, 10th Baron Byron (26 March 1861 – 6 June 1949) was an Anglican clergyman, nobleman, peer, politician, and the tenth Baron Byron, as a grandson of Admiral George Anson Byron, 7th Baron Byron, who was the cousin of Romantic poet and writer George Gordon Byron, 6th Baron Byron.

== Life ==
Byron was the son of the Hon. Frederick Byron and Mary Jane Wescomb. He graduated from Exeter College, Oxford, with the degree of Master of Arts (MA).

He was the Curate between 1888 and 1890 at Royston, Hertfordshire. He was the Rector between 1891 and 1914 at Langford, Essex, UK. He was the Vicar between 1914 and 1942 at Thrumpton, Nottinghamshire. He succeeded to the title of 10th Baron Byron in 1917 upon the death of his older brother Lt. George Frederick William Byron, 9th Baron Byron. He was the Rector between 1941 and 1942 at St. George's Church, Barton in Fabis.

Lord Byron died on 6 June 1949, and was succeeded by his first cousin once removed, Rupert Frederick George Byron, 11th Baron Byron (born 1903).

== Family ==
Lord Byron married Anna Ismay Ethel FitzRoy, daughter of Reverend Lord Charles Edward FitzRoy and the Hon. Ismay Mary Helen Augusta FitzRoy, in 1921. They had no children.

== Arms ==
Coat of arms of Frederick Byron, 10th Baron Byron
Coronet A Coronet of a Baron Crest A Mermaid proper Escutcheon Argent three Bendlets enhanced Gules Supporters On either side a Horse of a brown bay colour unguled Or Motto Crede Byron (Trust Byron)

Peerage of England
Preceded by George Byron	Baron Byron; 1917–1949	Succeeded by Rupert Byron
