= Francis Baring, 3rd Baron Ashburton =

American-born British politician and peer

The Right Honourable The Lord Ashburton

Member of the House of Lords
- Lord Temporal
- In office 23 March 1864 – 6 September 1868
- Preceded by: The 2nd Baron Ashburton
- Succeeded by: The 4th Baron Ashburton

Member of Parliament for Thetford
- In office 1830–1831 Serving with Lord James FitzRoy
- Preceded by: Bingham Baring; Lord Charles FitzRoy
- Succeeded by: Alexander Baring; Lord James Fitzroy

Member of Parliament for Thetford
- In office 1832–1841 Serving with: Lord James FitzRoy to 1834; Earl of Euston (1) from 1834
- Preceded by: Alexander Baring; Lord James Fitzroy
- Succeeded by: Bingham Baring; Earl of Euston (1)

Member of Parliament for Thetford
- In office 1848–1857 Serving with Earl of Euston (2)
- Preceded by: Earl of Euston (2); Bingham Baring
- Succeeded by: Earl of Euston (2); Alexander Baring

Personal details
- Born: 22 May 1800 Philadelphia, Pennsylvania, U.S.
- Died: 6 September 1868 (aged 68)
- Party: Tory
- Other political affiliations: Whig
- Children: Alexander Baring, 4th Baron Ashburton

Francis Baring, 3rd Baron Ashburton (22 May 1800 – 6 September 1868), was an American-born British politician and peer.

== Early life ==
He was born in Philadelphia, United States, the second son of Alexander Baring and Ann Louisa Bingham, the daughter and coheiress of the wealthy William Bingham of Blackpoint, Philadelphia, a U.S. senator. He was the younger brother of Bingham Baring. Francis was educated privately and at Geneva and in 1817 joined Baring Brothers, the family bank. After successfully travelling on business to North America and the West Indies he was made a quarter share partner in the bank in 1823.

However, after unfortunate financial speculations in Mexican land and in the French sugar market, he was demoted to a non-executive director in 1828 and in 1830 was given his brother's Parliamentary seat for Thetford.

== Political career ==
He was elected at the 1830 general election as a Whig MP for the borough of Thetford in Norfolk, and held the seat until the 1831 election, which he did not contest. He was re-elected in 1832 as a Tory, and held the seat as a Conservative until the 1841 general election, which he did not contest.

He was returned again for Thetford at a by-election in August 1848, and held the seat until his resignation through appointment as Steward of the Chiltern Hundreds on 30 November 1857.

Baring succeeded to the barony in 1864 on the death of his brother, Bingham Baring, becoming the 3rd Baron Ashburton.

== Personal life ==
Under the terms of the Slave Compensation Act 1837, Baring received approximately £56,000 in compensation from the British government as he was the mortgagee or assignee on eight different slave plantations in British Guiana.

He married in 1832 Claire Hortense (c. 1812 – 1882), a daughter of Hugues-Bernard Maret, duc de Bassano, and moved to live in Paris. He was the father of Alexander Baring, 4th Baron Ashburton, and Marie Anne Louise Baring (wife of William FitzRoy, 6th Duke of Grafton).

Parliament of the United Kingdom
Preceded by Bingham Baring; Lord Charles FitzRoy	Member of Parliament for Thetford; 1830–1831; With: Lord James FitzRoy	Succeeded by Alexander Baring; Lord James FitzRoy
Preceded by Alexander Baring; Lord James FitzRoy	Member of Parliament for Thetford; 1832–1841; With: Lord James FitzRoy to 1834; Earl of Euston (1) from 1834	Succeeded by Bingham Baring; Earl of Euston (1)
Preceded by Earl of Euston (2); Bingham Baring	Member of Parliament for Thetford; 1848–1857; With: Earl of Euston (2)	Succeeded by Earl of Euston (2); Alexander Baring
Peerage of the United Kingdom
Preceded by Bingham Baring	Baron Ashburton; 2nd creation 1864–1868; Member of the House of Lords (1864–1868)	Succeeded by Alexander Baring
