= Henry FitzRoy, 5th Duke of Grafton =

British peer and politician

His Grace The Duke of Grafton
- Duke of Grafton
- Born: Henry FitzRoy; 10 February 1790; Southill, Bedfordshire, England
- Died: 26 March 1863 (aged 73); Potterspury, Northamptonshire, England
- Spouse: Mary Caroline Berkeley (m. 1812)
- Issue: Lady Mary Phipps; Maria Douglas-Pennant, Baroness Penrhyn; William FitzRoy, 6th Duke of Grafton; Augustus FitzRoy, 7th Duke of Grafton; Lord Frederick FitzRoy
- Parents: George FitzRoy, 4th Duke of Grafton; Lady Charlotte Waldegrave

Henry FitzRoy, 5th Duke of Grafton (10 February 1790 – 26 March 1863), styled Viscount Ipswich until 1811 and Earl of Euston between 1811 and 1844, was a British peer and politician.

== Early life ==
Grafton was the eldest son of eleven children of George FitzRoy, 4th Duke of Grafton and Lady Charlotte Maria Waldegrave. Among his siblings were Lady Mary Anne FitzRoy (who married Sir William Oglander, 6th Baronet), Lady Elizabeth Anne FitzRoy (who married their first cousin John Henry Smyth), Lord Charles FitzRoy (who married Lady Anne Cavendish, a daughter of the 1st Earl of Burlington), and Lady Isabella Frances FitzRoy (who married Henry Joseph St. John).

His paternal grandparents were Augustus FitzRoy, 3rd Duke of Grafton, and Anne Lidell. His maternal grandparents were James Waldegrave, 2nd Earl Waldegrave and Maria Walpole (the illegitimate daughter of Sir Edward Walpole).

== Career ==
He represented Bury St Edmunds as member of parliament as a Whig between 1818 and 1820 and again between 1826 and 1831, and was member for Thetford between 1834 and 1841.

=== Military career ===
As a young man he served as a Lieutenant in the 7th Light Dragoons, but retired on 15 August 1812. On 23 September 1823 he was appointed Colonel of the East Suffolk Militia, but on 24 May 1830 he transferred to the vacant colonelcy of the West Suffolk Militia, which his father and grandfather had previously commanded. The duke resigned in 1845 and was succeeded by his son, William, Earl of Euston, on 24 December, the fourth generation of the family to command the regiment, but Euston was replaced within weeks.

== Personal life ==
On 20 June 1812 in Portugal, Grafton was married to Mary Caroline Berkeley (1795–1873), the daughter of Adm. Hon. Sir George Cranfield Berkeley. Together, they had five children:

- Lady Mary Elizabeth Emily Fitzroy (1817–1887), who married the Rev. Hon. Augustus Phipps, the youngest son of The Earl of Mulgrave.
- Lady Maria Louisa Fitzroy (1818–1912), who married Edward Douglas-Pennant, 1st Baron Penrhyn and had issue.
- William Henry FitzRoy, 6th Duke of Grafton (1819–1882), who married Hon. Marie Anne Louise Baring, the daughter of Francis Baring, 3rd Baron Ashburton and Claire Hortense Maret (a daughter of the former Prime Minister of France, Hugues-Bernard Maret, 1st Duke of Bassano), in 1858.
- Augustus Charles Lennox FitzRoy, 7th Duke of Grafton (1821–1918), who married Anna Balfour, a daughter of James Balfour, MP, in 1847.
- Lord Frederick John FitzRoy (1823–1919), MP for Thetford; he married Catherine Wescomb and had issue.

Grafton died in 1863, aged seventy-three, at Wakefield Lodge, near Potterspury, Northamptonshire.

Parliament of the United Kingdom
Preceded by Lord Charles FitzRoy; Frederick Foster	Member of Parliament for Bury St Edmunds; 1818–1820; With: Arthur Upton	Succeeded by Arthur Upton; Lord John FitzRoy
Preceded by Arthur Upton; Lord John FitzRoy	Member of Parliament for Bury St Edmunds; 1826–1831; With: Earl Jermyn	Succeeded by Earl Jermyn; Charles Augustus FitzRoy
Preceded by Lord James FitzRoy; Francis Baring	Member of Parliament for Thetford; 1834–1841; With: Francis Baring 1834–1841; Hon. Bingham Baring 1841	Succeeded by Hon. Bingham Baring; Sir James Flower
Peerage of England
Preceded by George FitzRoy	Duke of Grafton; 1844–1863	Succeeded by William FitzRoy
