= Augustus FitzRoy, 7th Duke of Grafton =

British Army officer

His Grace The Duke of Grafton KG CB
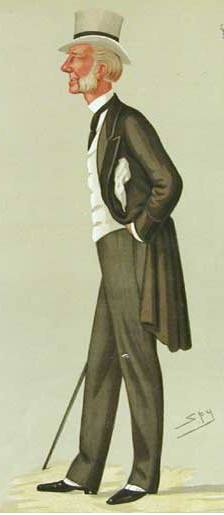
- Born: Augustus Charles Lennox FitzRoy; 21 June 1821; London, England
- Died: 4 December 1918 (aged 97); Potterspury, Northamptonshire, England
- Spouse: Anna Balfour (m. 1847; died 1857)
- Issue Detail: Eleanor Harbord, Baroness Suffield; Henry FitzRoy, Earl of Euston; Alfred FitzRoy, 8th Duke of Grafton; Lord Charles Edward FitzRoy
- Parents: Henry FitzRoy, 5th Duke of Grafton; Mary Caroline Cranfield Berkeley

Augustus Charles Lennox FitzRoy, 7th Duke of Grafton KG CB (22 June 1821 – 4 December 1918), styled Lord Augustus FitzRoy before 1882, was a British Army officer.

== Early life ==
He was the second son of Henry FitzRoy, 5th Duke of Grafton, and his wife Mary Caroline Cranfield Berkeley. Among his siblings were Lady Mary Elizabeth Emily FitzRoy (wife of the Rev. Hon. Augustus Phipps, the youngest son of The Earl of Mulgrave), Lady Maria Louisa FitzRoy (wife of Edward Douglas-Pennant, 1st Baron Penrhyn), William FitzRoy, 6th Duke of Grafton, and Lord Frederick FitzRoy (who married Catherine Sarah Wilhelimna Wescomb, daughter of the Rev. William Wescomb).

His paternal grandparents were George FitzRoy, 4th Duke of Grafton and Lady Charlotte Maria Waldegrave (a daughter of the 2nd Earl Waldegrave and Maria Walpole, herself the illegitimate daughter of Sir Edward Walpole). His maternal grandparents were Adm. Hon. Sir George Cranfield Berkeley and Emilia Charlotte Lennox (a daughter of Lord George Lennox).

== Career and inheritance ==
He joined the army in 1837 and was wounded in the Crimean War.

In 1882 upon the death of his elder brother, William, who died without issue, he succeeded to the dukedom of Grafton (created in September 1675 in the Peerage of England for his direct ancestor, Henry FitzRoy, an illegitimate son of King Charles II of England and his mistress Barbara Villiers), as well as the subsidiary titles, Earl of Euston, Viscount Ipswich and Baron Sudbury. Following his asccession, Augustus leased a large London house overlooking The Mall at No. 17 Carlton House Terrace from 1891 until 1901. From 1902 his London home was No. 6 Chesterfield Gardens, which he continued to occupy whilst in London for the remainder of his life.

== Personal life ==
=== Marriage and children ===
On 9 June 1847, he married Anna Balfour (1825–1857), daughter of James Balfour, MP, and Lady Eleanor Maitland (a daughter of the Tory politician James Maitland, 8th Earl of Lauderdale). Together, they had four children:

- Lady Eleanor FitzRoy (1853–1905), who married Walter Harbord, son of Edward Harbord, 3rd Baron Suffield, and had issue.
- Henry James FitzRoy, Earl of Euston (1848–1912), who married Kate Walsh; no issue.
- Alfred FitzRoy, 8th Duke of Grafton (1850–1930), who married Margaret Rose Smith in 1875. After her death in 1913, he married Lady Borthwick (née Susanna Mary MacTaggart-Stewart), widow of Archibald Borthwick, 20th Lord Borthwick and daughter of Sir Mark McTaggart-Stewart, 1st Baronet, in 1916.
- Lord Charles Edward FitzRoy (1857–1911), who married his distant cousin Hon. Ismay FitzRoy, a daughter of the 3rd Baron Southampton, and had issue (Charles FitzRoy, 10th Duke of Grafton).

=== Death and estate ===
He died in 1918, aged 97, at Wakefield Lodge near Potterspury, Northamptonshire.

In March 1919 probate of the Duke's will was granted to his successor Alfred FitzRoy, 8th Duke of Grafton, Herbert Walter Samuelson, and solicitor Henry Le Fevre Farrer. The Duke's unsettled estate was valued at £475,079 gross, with a net value of £437,063.

In his will, he created a £6,000 trust fund which his widowed daughter-in-law Lady Charles FitzRoy would receive the income from during her lifetime, with a remainder to her children.

The Duke had resettled the family estates in 1902, and in his will he bequeathed £300 outright to each to the Estate trustees. He also made a series of bequests to his servants, including £100 outright and an annuity of £200 to his Steward Alfred Caine, with an annuity of £100 for Alfred's widow provided she did not remarry, an annuity of £50 to his former house steward John Mussell, an annuity of £100 to his Butler Robert Horne, and one year's wages with to all other servants who had been in his employ for fifteen years or longer.

The residue of the Duke's personal estate was bequeathed to the eldest son and successor Alfred FitzRoy, 8th Duke of Grafton.

Peerage of England
Preceded by William FitzRoy	Duke of Grafton; 1882–1918	Succeeded by Alfred FitzRoy
