= George Byron, 9th Baron Byron =

British nobleman, army officer and politician (1855–1917)

Lieutenant The Right Honourable The Lord Byron

Member of the House of Lords Lord Temporal
- In office 27 December 1876 – 30 March 1917; Hereditary peerage
- Preceded by: The 8th Baron Byron
- Succeeded by: The 10th Baron Byron

Personal details
- Born: 27 December 1855
- Died: 30 March 1917 (aged 61)
- Spouse: Fanny Lucy Radmall
- Parent(s): Frederick Byron; Mary Jane Wescomb

Lieutenant George Frederick William Byron, 9th Baron Byron (27 December 1855 – 30 March 1917) was a British nobleman, army officer, peer, politician, and the ninth Baron Byron, as a grandson of Admiral George Anson Byron, 7th Baron Byron, who was the cousin of Romantic poet and writer George Gordon Byron, 6th Baron Byron.

== Life ==
Byron was the son of Frederick Byron and Mary Jane Wescomb. He was educated at Harrow School. He succeeded to the title of 9th Baron Byron in 1870 upon the death of his uncle, Captain George Anson Byron, 8th Baron Byron. He graduated from Christ Church, Oxford, in 1880 with the degree of Bachelor of Arts (BA). In 1899 he was declared bankrupt. He held the rank of Lieutenant in the 4th Battalion, Essex Regiment.

Byron wrote on current affairs for the Times and other publications. However, as he more often wrote under pseudonyms, his true identity was not even revealed to editors, and most of his work is lost.

In 2020 new research revealed Byron's bankruptcy at the hands of a society con-woman. As a result of this he accepted the marriage proposal of Mrs. Lucy Broadhead, a divorcee formerly married to Theodore Francis Brinckman, son of Sir Theodore Brinckman, 2nd Baronet. Mrs. Broadhead agreed to pay off his debts and in return became Lady Byron. After Byron's death, she married Sir Robert Houston, 1st Baronet, and became better known as Lady Houston, England's second richest woman, nationalist, and proprietor of the Saturday Review.

Lord Byron died on 30 March 1917, and was succeeded by his younger brother, the Reverend Frederick Ernest Charles Byron, 10th Baron Byron (born 1861).

== Family ==
Lord Byron married Fanny Lucy Radmall, at that time known as Mrs. Lucy Broadhead, in 1901; they had no children.

== Arms ==
Coat of arms of George Byron, 9th Baron Byron
Coronet A Coronet of a Baron Crest A Mermaid proper Escutcheon Argent three Bendlets enhanced Gules Supporters On either side a Horse of a brown bay colour unguled Or Motto Crede Byron (Trust Byron)

Peerage of England
Preceded by George Anson Byron	Baron Byron; 1870–1917	Succeeded by Frederick Byron
