= Archibald Douglas (British Army officer, born 1707) =

Scottish Army officer and Member of Parliament

Lieutenant-General Archibald Douglas of Kirkton (1707 – 8 November 1778) was a Scottish Army officer and Member of Parliament.

== Early life ==
He was the eldest son of William Douglas of Fingland and Lanarkshire heiress, Elizabeth "Betty" Clerk of Glenboig. His father was a Captain in the Royal Scots and fought in Germany and Spain. A former Jacobite, however, he had been forced to sell the family estate.

== Career ==
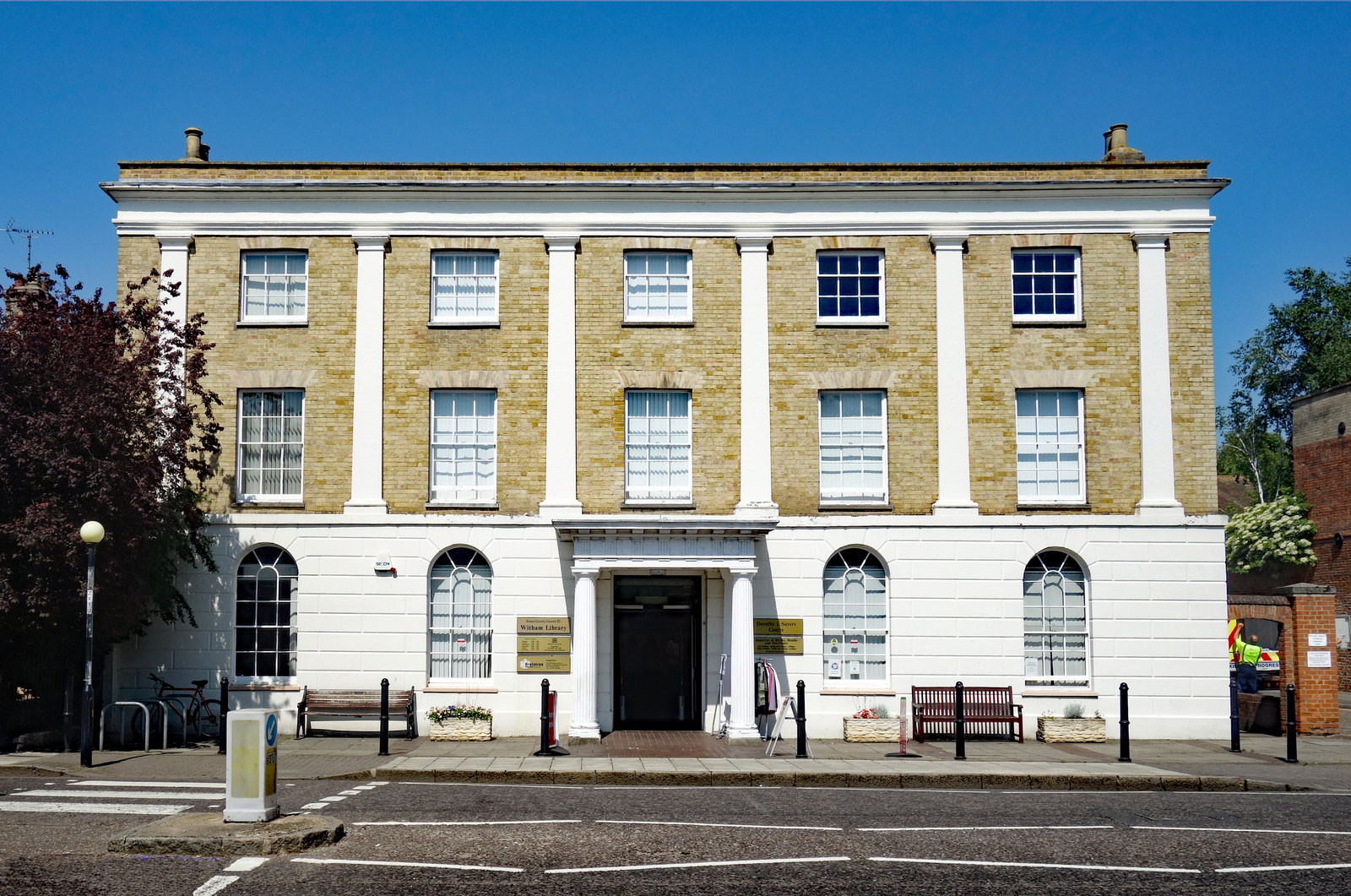
Former White Hall, Witham, now the Witham Public Library.

He joined the army as a Cornet in the 4th Dragoons (then Sir Robert Rich's Dragoons) in 1739, rising to lieutenant in 1742, captain in 1745, major in 1746, lieutenant-colonel in 1746, colonel in 1756, major-general in 1759 and lieutenant-general in 1761. He took part in the Battles of Dettingen (where he had 3 horses shot from under him and an eyebrow shot away) and Minden. In 1756 he was made Aide-de-Camp to King George II. In 1758 he was made Regimental Colonel of the 13th Dragoons, a position he held until his death.

He sat as member for the Dumfries Burghs (Lochmaben, Annan and Sanquhar) from 1754 to 1761, and for Dumfriesshire from 1761 to 1774. In 1763 he purchased a country house in Newland Street, Witham, Essex which was later known as White Hall.

== Personal life ==
In 1746 he married Elizabeth Burchard, a daughter of Edmund Burchard of Witham, Essex, with whom he had six sons and five daughters, including:

- Archibald Martin John Douglas (1747–1787), a Captain of the 13th Dragoons; he married Mary Elizabeth Crosbie.
- William Douglas (1755–1802), a Judge in India; he married Jane Bell in 1785.
- Alexander Douglas (1756–1793), a Captain in the Royal Navy; he married Margaret Maxwell.
- Philip Douglas (1758–1822), the vicar of Gedney from 1796 until his death.
- Jane Douglas (1760–1837), who married William Van Mildert, the Bishop of Durham who was the last to rule the County Palatine of Durham.
- Robert Douglas (1765–1806), who married Frances Vaughan, a daughter of Henry Vaughan Jeffreys of Kirkham Abbey, in 1787.

Douglas died in Dublin in 1778 and was buried at St Nicholas church, Witham, where there is a memorial to him.

=== Descendants ===
Through his son William, he was a grandfather of Philip Henry Douglas (1786–1867), who married Susanna Aplin; Jane Douglas (1789–1868), who married the Rev. William Wescomb of Thrumpton Hall in Nottinghamshire; and Mary Douglas (1794–1884), who married Edward Stanley of Dalegarth and Ponsonby, MP for West Cumberland.

Parliament of Great Britain
Preceded by Sir James Johnstone	Member of Parliament for Dumfries Burghs; 1754–1761	Succeeded by Thomas Miller
Preceded by James Veitch	Member of Parliament for Dumfriesshire; 1761–1774	Succeeded by Sir Robert Laurie
Military offices
Preceded by John Mostyn	Colonel of the 13th Dragoons; 1758–1778	Succeeded by Richard Pierson
