= George Byron, 7th Baron Byron =

Royal Navy Admiral, cousin of the poet Byron (1789–1868)

Admiral The Right Honourable The Lord Byron

Member of the House of Lords Lord Temporal
- In office 19 April 1824 – 1 March 1868; Hereditary peerage
- Preceded by: The 6th Baron Byron
- Succeeded by: The 8th Baron Byron

Personal details
- Born: George Anson Byron; 8 March 1789 Bath, Somerset
- Died: 2 March 1868 (aged 78) Brighton, Sussex
- Spouse: Elizabeth Mary Chandos Pole (m. 1816; died 1868)
- Relations: Lord Byron (cousin)

Military service
- Allegiance: United Kingdom
- Branch/service: Royal Navy
- Years of service: 1800–1862
- Rank: Admiral
- Commands: HMS Blonde
- Battles/wars: Gunboat War: Battle of Alvøen; Napoleonic Wars

Admiral George Anson Byron, 7th Baron Byron (8 March 1789 – 2 March 1868) was a British nobleman, naval officer, peer, politician, and the seventh Baron Byron, in 1824 succeeding his cousin the poet George Gordon Byron, 6th Baron Byron in that peerage. As a career naval officer, he was notable for being his predecessor's opposite in temperament and lifestyle.

== Early life ==
Byron was born on 8 March 1789 at Bath, Somerset. He was the only son of Capt. Hon. George Anson Byron and Charlotte Henrietta Dallas. His sister, Juliana Maria Charlotte Byron, married the Rev. Robert Heath.

His paternal grandfather was the explorer Admiral Hon. John Byron, who circumnavigated the world with George Anson in 1740–44. His maternal grandparents were Robert Dallas and Sarah Elizabeth Cormack.

== Career ==
Byron joined the Royal Navy as a volunteer in December 1800, serving in the Napoleonic Wars, and attaining the rank of captain in 1814. In 1824 Byron was chosen to accompany homewards the bodies of Hawaiian monarchs Liholiho (known as King Kamehameha II) and Queen Kamāmalu, who had died of measles during a state visit to England. He sailed on HMS Blonde in September 1824, accompanied by several naturalists and, amongst his lieutenants, Edward Belcher. He toured the islands and recorded his observations. With the consent of Christian missionaries to the islands, he also removed wooden carvings and other artefacts of the chiefs of ancient Hawaii from the temple ruins of Puʻuhonua O Hōnaunau.

On his return journey in 1825, Lord Byron discovered and charted Malden Island, which he named after his surveying officer; also the island of Mauke which he named "Parry Island" in honour of Sir William Edward Parry, and Starbuck Island. Starbuck was named in honour of Capt. Valentine Starbuck, an American whaler who had sighted the island while carrying the Hawaiian royal couple to England in 1823–1824, but had probably been previously sighted by his cousin and fellow-whaler Capt. Obed Starbuck in 1823. Malden may have been the island sighted by another whaling captain William Clark in 1823, aboard the Winslow. Byron became a rear-admiral in 1849, a vice-admiral in 1857 and retired as admiral in 1862.

== Personal life ==
On 18 March 1816, he married Elizabeth Mary Chandos Pole, the daughter of Sacheverell Pole Esq., of Radbourne Hall. He became of representative of Sir John Chandos, and by sign manual (or deed poll), assumed the additional surname of Chandos. Elizabeth was descended from a well-documented long line of the Pole family, including Cardinal Pole, who at the time of Henry VIII, was the last Catholic Archbishop of Canterbury and the son of the last Yorkist heiress, Margaret, countess of Salisbury. Elizabeth's mother, Mary, was the daughter of the Rev. Henry Ware, D.D., Rector of Balrothey. Together, the couple had seven children:

- The Hon. Mary Anne Byron (c. 1817–1885), who married John Blenkinsopp Coulson of Blenkinsop Castle, in 1834.
- George Anson Byron, 8th Baron Byron (1818–1870), a Captain in the 19th Foot; he married Lucy Elizabeth Jane Wescomb, a daughter of the Rev. William Wescomb and Jane Douglas (a granddaughter of Archibald Douglas, MP), in 1843.
- The Hon. Francis Xavier Byron (b. 1820), who died young.
- The Hon. Frederick Byron (1822–1861), who married Mary Jane Wescomb, also a daughter of the Rev. William Wescomb and Jane Douglas, in 1851.
- The Hon. Georgiana Byron (1824–1893), who married Charles Rowland Palmer-Morewood, son of William Palmer-Morewood and Clara Blois, in 1842.
- The Rev. Hon. Augustus Byron (1828–1907), who married Frederica McMahon, daughter of Lt.-Gen. Sir Thomas McMahon, 2nd Baronet and Emily Anne Westropp, in 1852.
- The Rev. Hon. William Byron (1831–1907), who married Mary Elizabeth Kindersley, daughter of Sir Richard Torin Kindersley, in 1857. After her death in 1877, he married Mary Burnside, daughter of Rev. John Burnside, in 1878.

Lord Byron died on 3 March 1868 at age 78 at Brighton, Sussex and was buried at Kirkby Mallory, Leicestershire. His will was proven on 20 March 1868, at under £30,000.

== Arms ==
Coat of arms of George Byron, 7th Baron Byron
Coronet A Coronet of a Baron Crest A Mermaid proper Escutcheon Argent three Bendlets enhanced Gules Supporters On either side a Horse of a brown bay colour unguled Or Motto Crede Byron (Trust Byron)

== See also ==
- European and American voyages of scientific exploration
- O'Byrne, William Richard (1849). "Byron, George Anson" . A Naval Biographical Dictionary . John Murray – via Wikisource.

== Notes ==
Peerage of England
Preceded by George Gordon Byron	Baron Byron; 1824–1868	Succeeded by George Anson Byron
