= Lord James FitzRoy =

James Henry FitzRoy (1804 – 26 July 1834) was a British politician.

The third son of the Duke of Grafton, FitzRoy joined the British Army, becoming a captain in the 10th Royal Hussars. At the 1831 UK general election, he stood for the Whigs in Thetford, winning a seat. He served until his death, in 1834.
