= Byron (surname) =

Byron is a surname, and may refer to:

- Akilah Byron-Nisbett, politician from Saint Kitts and Nevis
- Alan Byron (1936–1982), Australian rules footballer
- Allegra Byron (1817–1822), illegitimate daughter of Lord Byron and Claire Clairmont
- Amelia Byron, Baroness Conyers, (1754–1784), second wife of John Byron the father of Lord Byron
- Andrew Byron, American politician from Wyoming
- Angela Byron (born 1977/8), Canadian software developer
- Annie Byron Australian film, stage and television actress
- Antoinette Byron (born 1961/2), Australian actress
- April Byron (1947–2019), Australian pop singer and songwriter
- Archie Byron (1928–2005), American sculptor, painter and political activist
- Arthur Byron (1872–1943), American actor
- Arthur Byron (tenor) (1846–1890), English tenor, a concert and opera singer
- Augusta Mary Byron, married name Augusta Leigh (1783–1851), half-sister of Lord Byron
- Avior Byron (born 1973), Israeli singer-songwriter and musicologist
- Beverly Byron (1932–2025), American politician from Maryland, wife of Goodloe Byron
- Bill Byron (1876–1961), Irish rugby union footballer
- Bourmond Byron (1920–2004), Haitian painter
- Bruce Byron (born 1959), English actor
- Carol Byron (born 1937), American former actress, model, and businesswoman
- Catherine Byron (born 1947), Irish poet
- Cheryl Byron (c.1947–2003), Trinidadian visual artist, dancer and singer
- Christopher M. Byron (1944–2017), American financial writer
- Cyril Byron (1920–2015), American baseball player and Tuskegee Airman of World War II
- David Byron (1947–1985), British musician, singer of Uriah Heep
- Delma Byron (1913–2006), American actress
- Dennis Byron (born 1943), Saint Kitts and Nevis judge, son of Vincent F. Byron
- Diarmuid Byron-O'Connor (born 1964), British artist
- Don Byron (born 1958), American jazz composer and musician
- Ed Byron (1905–1964), American radio producer
- Ellen Byron (born 1956), American novelist, screenwriter and producer
- Elsa Spear Byron (1896–1992), American photographer
- Fergal Byron (born 1974), Irish Gaelic football player
- Frances Byron, Baroness Byron (1703–1757), third wife of William Byron, 4th Baron Byron
- Frank Byron, American politician
- Frederick Byron (cricketer) (1822–1861), English barrister and cricketer
- Frederick George Byron (1764–1792), English amateur artist and caricaturist
- Frederick Byron, 10th Baron Byron (1861–1949), Anglican clergyman and British peer
- Gary Byron (born 1970), American politician from Connecticut and radio host
- George Byron, 7th Baron Byron (1789–1868), British naval officer and politician, cousin of poet George Gordon Byron
- George Byron, 8th Baron Byron (1818–1870), British army officer and politician
- George Byron, 9th Baron Byron (1855–1917), British army officer and peer
- Gilbert Byron (1903–1991), American writer
- Goodloe Byron (1929–1978), American politician from Maryland
- Henry James Byron (1835–1884)), British dramatist and theatre manager
- Imogen Byron (born 1996), English actress
- Jean Byron (1925–2006), American actress
- Jean-Michel Byron (born 1957), South African funk and rock vocalist
- Jeffrey Byron (born 1955), American actor and writer
- Jim Byron (nonprofit executive) (born 1993), American nonprofit executive
- Jim Byron (publicist), American publicist
- John Byron (1723–1786), British Royal Navy officer, explorer and colonial administrator
- John Byron (died 1450) (1386–1450), English Member of Parliament
- John Byron (died 1567) (1488–1567), English Member of Parliament
- John Byron (died 1600) (c.1526–1600), English knight and politician
- John Byron (died 1623) (c.1562–1623), English Member of Parliament, father of 1st Baron Byron
- John Byron (British Army officer) (1757–1791), father of poet Lord Byron
- John Byron, 1st Baron Byron (1599–1652), English politician and Royalist army officer
- Joseph Byron (1847– 1923), English photographer
- Judy Byron, American artist
- Kari Byron (born 1974), American television host
- Katharine Byron (1903–1976), American politician from Maryland, wife of William D. Byron
- Kitty Byron (1878– after 1908), British convicted murderer
- Lady Byron (Anne Isabella Milbanke) (1792–1860), English philanthropist, married Lord Byron in 1815, separating from him that year
- Kathy Byron (born 1953), American politician from Virginia
- Kathleen Byron (1921–2009), English actress
- Lord Byron (George Gordon Byron, 6th Baron Byron) (1788–1824), English celebrity poet
- Lord Byron (umpire) (1872–1955), American baseball umpire
- Marion Byron (1911–1985), American silent film actress and comedian
- May Byron (1861–1936), British writer and poet
- Medora Gordon Byron (c.1782–1858), pseudonymous Romantic-era novelist
- Melinda Byron (1936–2018), American film actress
- Michael Byron (footballer) (born 1987), English footballer
- Michael J. Byron (artist) (born 1954), American visual artist
- Michael J. Byron (general) (born 1941), United States Marine Corps general
- Minnie Byron, stage name of Louisa Elizabeth Babb (1861–1901), English singer and actress
- Nicholas Byron (1416–1503), English knight
- Nina Byron (1900–1987), New Zealand–American silent film actress and showgirl
- Norm Byron (1897–1959), Australian rules footballer
- Oliver Doud Byron (1842–1920), American stage actor
- Olwyn Byron, British physicist
- Paul Byron (born 1989), Canadian ice hockey player
- Paul G. Byron (born 1959), American judge from Florida
- Percy Claude Byron (1878–1959), English photographer
- Red Byron (Robert Nold Byron) (1915–1960), American NASCAR driver
- Richard Byron (Royal Navy officer) (1769–1837), British Royal Navy officer in the French Revolutionary and Napoleonic Wars
- Richard Byron, 2nd Baron Byron (1606–1679), English Royalist politician
- Richard Byron, 12th Baron Byron (1899–1989), British army officer and peer
- Robert Byron (cricketer) (1910–1952), South African cricketer
- Robert Byron (Royalist) (1611–1673), Anglo-Irish soldier, Member of the Irish Parliament
- Robert Byron (travel writer) (1905–1941), British travel writer, art critic and historian
- Robert Byron, 13th Baron Byron (born 1950), British barrister and peer
- Ron Byron (1931–2009), Australian rules footballer
- Rupert Byron, 11th Baron Byron (1903–1983), British farmer and grazier in Australia
- Stuart Byron (1941–1991), American film critic and gay rights activist
- Tabitha Byron (born 2010), British actress
- Tanya Byron (born 1967), British psychologist
- Thomas Byron (c. 1610–1644), Royalist officer of the First English Civil War
- Tom Byron (born 1961), American pornographic film actor and director
- Vince Byron (born 1990), Australian BMX rider
- Vincent F. Byron, British colonial governor
- Walter Byron (actor) (1899–1972), English film actor
- Walter Byron (ice hockey) (1894–1971), Icelandic-Canadian ice hockey player
- William Byron (MP) (1749–1776), British politician
- William Byron (racing driver) (born 1997), American race car driver
- William Byron, 3rd Baron Byron (1636–1695), British peer
- William Byron, 4th Baron Byron (1669–1736), British peer
- William Byron, 5th Baron Byron (1722–1798), British peer, politician and duellist
- William D. Byron (1929–1978), American politician from Maryland
- William J. Byron (1927–2024), American Jesuit priest

== See also ==
- Biron (surname)
- Byram (surname)
- Byrom
- Byrum (surname)
