= John Byron (disambiguation) =

John Byron (1723–1786) was a Royal Navy vice-admiral.

John Byron may also refer to:

- Sir John Byron (died 1450) (1386–1450), MP for Lincolnshire and Lancashire
- Sir John Byron (died 1567) (1488–1567), MP for Nottinghamshire
- Sir John Byron (died 1600) (c. 1526–1600), son of the preceding
- Sir John Byron (died 1623) (1562–1623), son of the preceding, great-great-grandfather of the admiral
- John Byron, 1st Baron Byron (1599–1652), English Royalist, son of the preceding
- John Byron (British Army officer) (1756–1791), father of the poet Lord Byron, son of the admiral

== See also ==
- Byron Nelson (John Byron Nelson, 1912–2006), American golfer
- Byron Villarias (John Byron Villarias, born 1988), Filipino basketball player
