= John Hutchinson (Roundhead) =

English politician and army officer

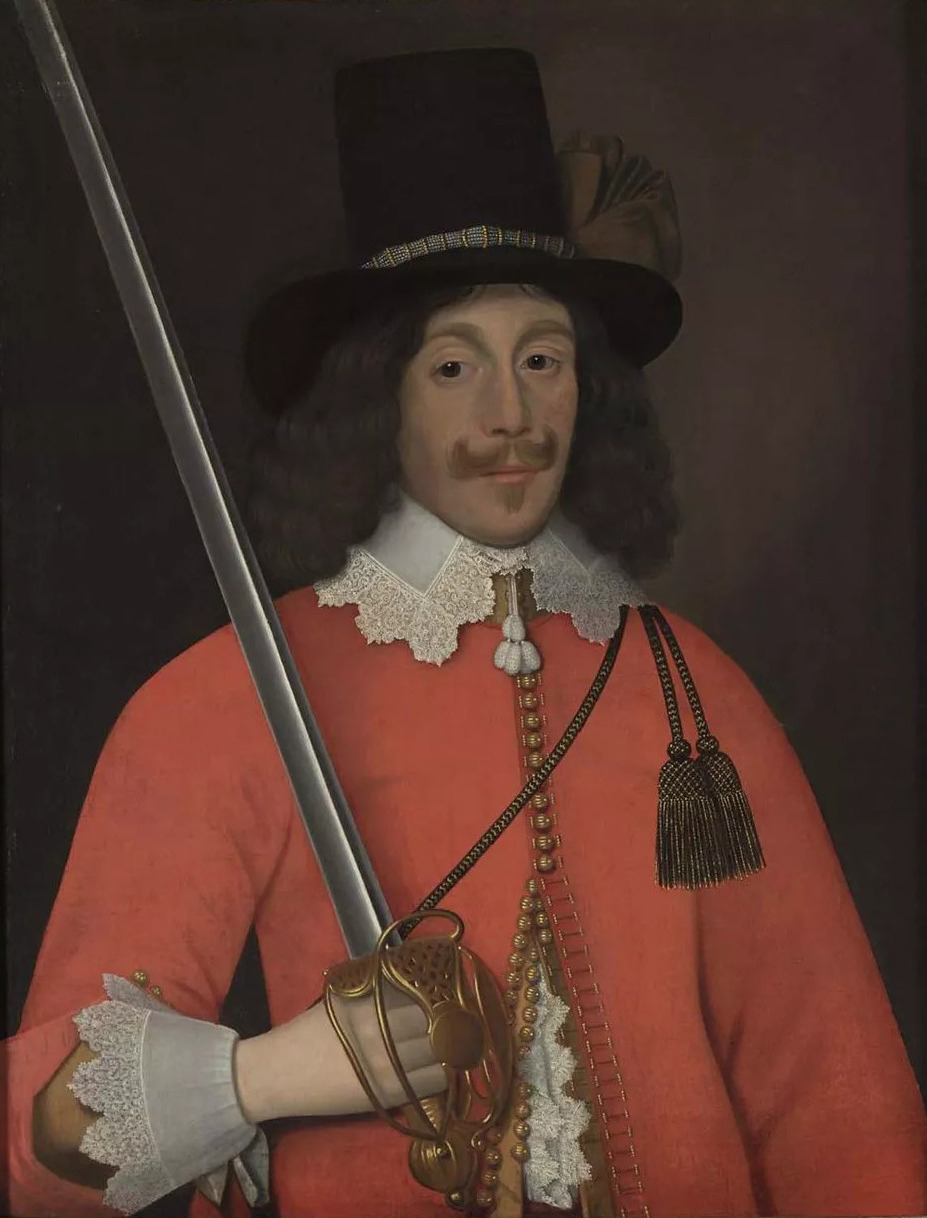
- Portrait by John Souch, c. 1643

Member of the House of Commons of England
- In office 1646 – 1653, briefly in 1660

Governor of Nottingham Castle and Town
- Incumbent
- Assumed office 29 June 1643

Commissioner for Exclusion from Sacrament in 1646 and Commissioner for Scandalous Offences in 1648

Personal details
- Born: 18 September 1615 Owthorpe Hall, Nottinghamshire
- Died: 11 September 1664 (aged 48) Sandown Castle, Kent
- Cause of death: Fever
- Spouse: Lucy Apsley (before 1664)
- Children: 9, including John and Barbara
- Parent(s): Thomas Hutchinson and Margaret Byron
- Relatives: Sir John Byron (Maternal Grandfather)
- Education: Nottingham Grammar School; Lincoln Grammar School; Peterhouse, Cambridge; Lincoln's Inn
- Occupation: Politician; Military Leader

Military service
- Allegiance: Parliamentarians during the English Civil War
- Branch/service: Parliamentary Army
- Years of service: English Civil War Period
- Rank: Colonel
- Battles/wars: English Civil War

Colonel John Hutchinson (18 September 1615 – 11 September 1664) was an English politician and army officer who played a significant role during the English Civil War. He was a Member of the House of Commons of England from 1646 to 1653 and briefly in 1660. Hutchinson was a prominent Puritan leader and served in the parliamentary army. As a member of the high court of justice in 1649, he was the 13th of 59 Commissioners who signed the death warrant of Charles I of England.

After the 1660 Stuart Restoration, he was exempted from the general pardon, barring him from holding public office. Accused of involvement in the Farnley Wood Plot in 1663, he was imprisoned and died in custody. He invested very successfully in buying paintings from the art collection of Charles I after his execution, spending very large amounts relative to his wealth. After a few years, he resold them for substantial profits.

== Life ==
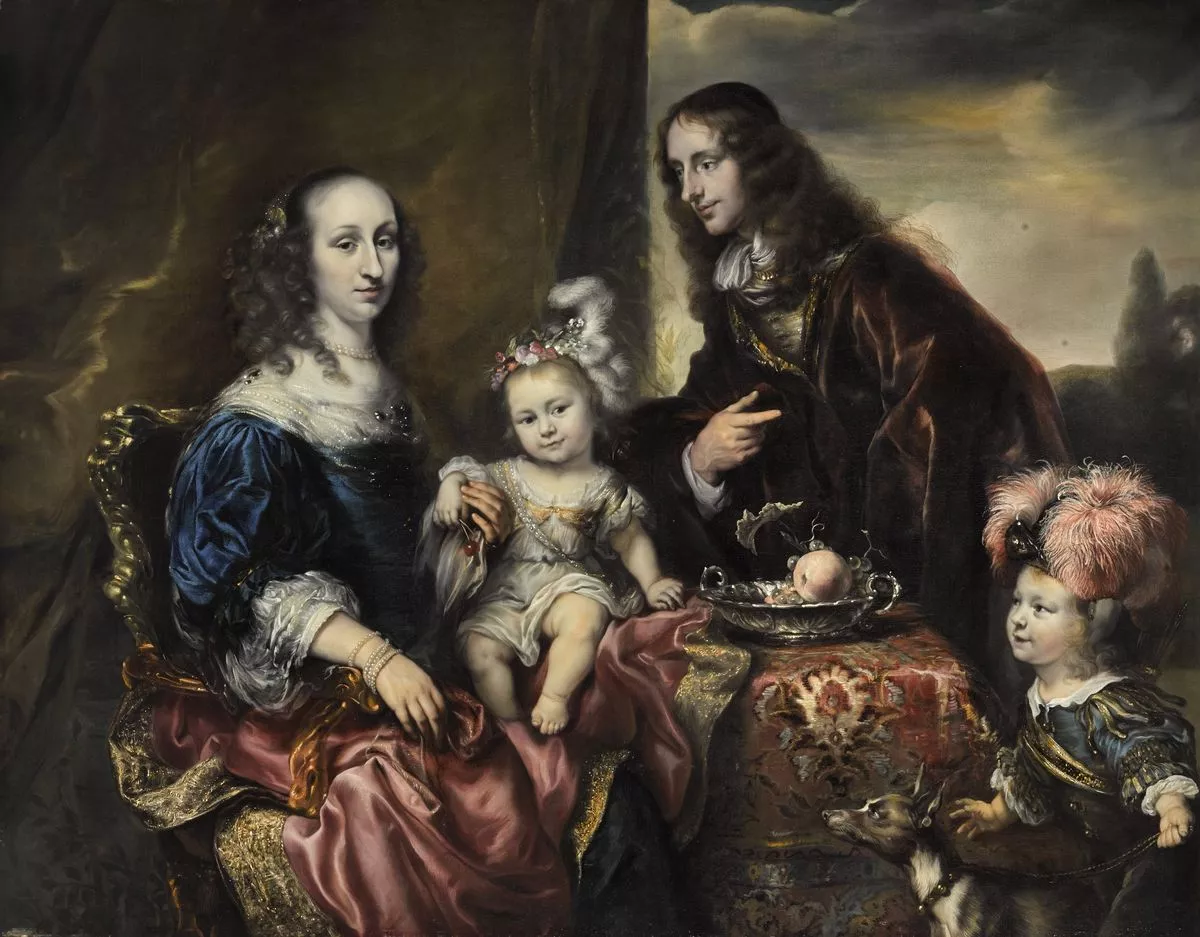
Possible portrait of Hutchinson and his family (Jürgen Ovens, 1659)

Hutchinson was born to Thomas Hutchinson, the owner of Owthorpe Hall, and Margaret Byron. Margaret was the daughter of Sir John Byron of Newstead and Margaret FitzWilliam, who was herself the daughter of Lord Deputy Sir William FitzWilliam and Ann Sidney (daughter of Sir William Sidney).

Hutchinson was baptised on 18 September 1615. He was educated at Nottingham Grammar School, followed by Lincoln Grammar School, where he found the Master, John Clarke, to be 'a supercilious pedant'. He later continued his studies at Peterhouse, Cambridge. In 1636, Hutchinson enrolled in Lincoln's Inn to study law, but soon shifted his focus to music and divinity, sidelining the study of law.

Unlike his Royalist father, Sir Thomas Hutchinson, who represented Nottinghamshire in the Long Parliament, he took the parliamentary side. He first distinguished himself by preventing Viscount Newark, the lord-lieutenant of the county, from seizing the county powder magazine for the king's service. He next accepted a commission as Lieutenant-Colonel in the regiment of Nottinghamshire Trained Bands raised by Colonel Francis Pierrepont, and became one of the parliamentary committee for Nottinghamshire.

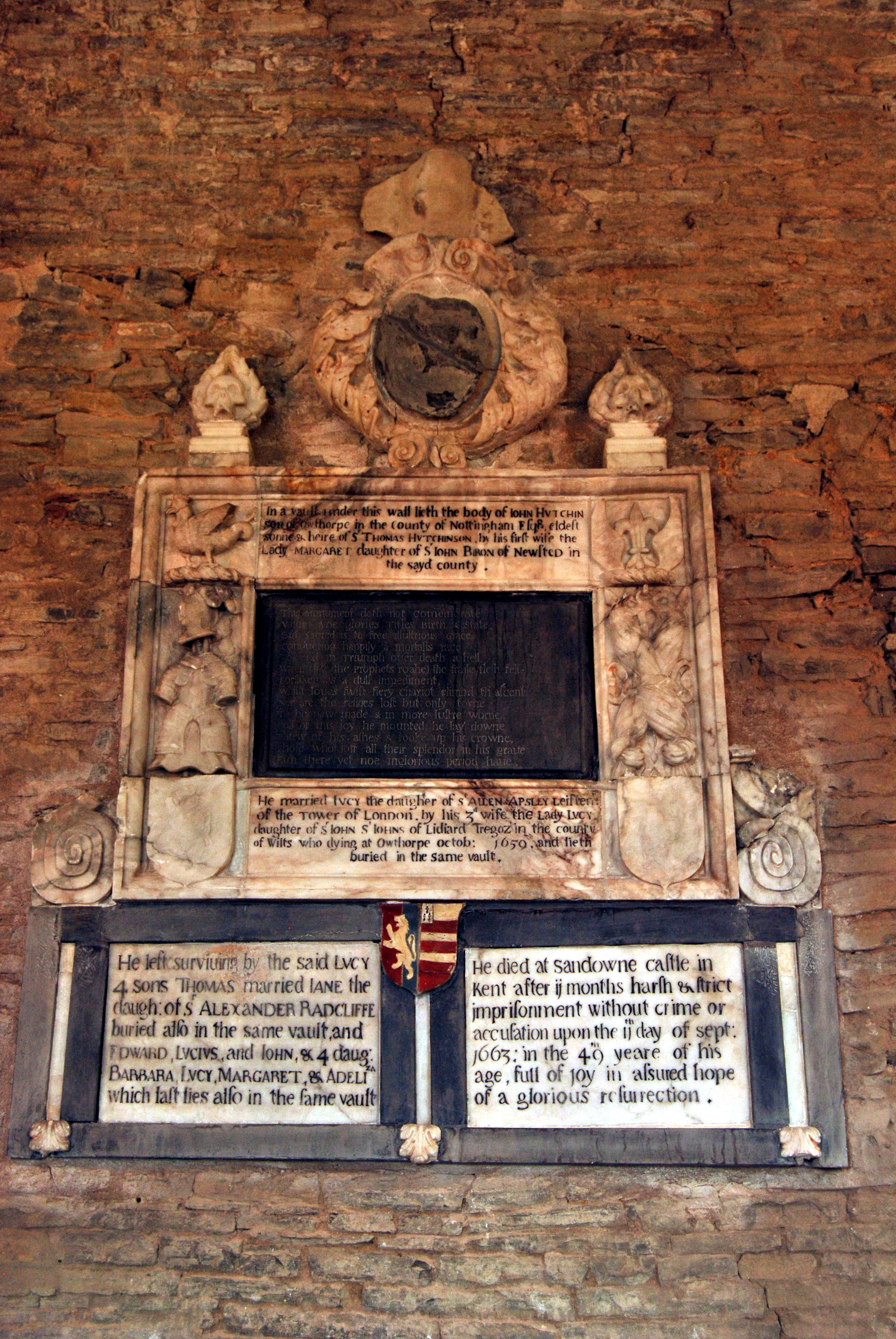
Commemorative plaque to Hutchinson at St Margarets

On 29 June 1643, at the order of the committee and of Sir John Meldrum, Hutchinson undertook the command of Nottingham Castle; he received from Lord Fairfax in the following November a commission to raise a foot regiment, and was finally appointed by Parliament governor of both town and castle. The town was unfortified, the garrison weak and ill-supplied, with the committee torn by political and personal feuds.

The neighbouring royalist commanders, Hutchinson's cousin (Sir Richard Byron), and William, Marquess of Newcastle, attempted to corrupt Hutchinson. Newcastle's agent offered him £10,000, and promised that he should be made "the best lord in Nottinghamshire", but Hutchinson indignantly refused to entertain such proposals.

The town was often attacked. Sir Charles Lucas entered it in January 1644 and endeavoured to set it on fire, and in April 1645 a party from Newark captured the fort at Trent-bridges. Hutchinson succeeded in making good these losses, and answered each new summons to surrender with fresh defiance.

The difficulties were increased by continual disputes between Hutchinson and the committee, which were a natural result, in Nottingham as elsewhere, of the divided authority set up by Parliament. But there is evidence that Hutchinson was irritable, quick-tempered, and deficient in self-control. The Committee of Both Kingdoms endeavoured to end the quarrel by a compromise, which Hutchinson found great difficulty in persuading his opponents to accept.

On 16 March 1646, Hutchinson was returned to Parliament as member for Nottinghamshire, succeeding to the seat held by his father, who had died on 18 August 1643. His religious views led him to attach himself to the Independent rather than the Presbyterian party. As governor, he had protected the separatists to the best of his ability, and now, under his wife's influence, he adopted the main tenet of the Baptists. He was commissioner for exclusion from sacrament in 1646 and commissioner for scandalous offences in 1648.

On 22 December 1648, Hutchinson signed the protest against the votes of the House of Commons accepting the concessions made by the king at the treaty of Newport, and consented to act as one of the judges at the trial of Charles I. According to his wife, he was nominated to the latter post very much against his will; "but, looking upon himself as called hereunto, durst not refuse it, as holding himself obliged by the covenant of God and the public trust of his country reposed in him". After serious consideration and prayer he signed the sentence against the king.

From 13 February 1649 to 1651 Hutchinson was a member of the first two Councils of State of the Commonwealth, but he took no very active part in public affairs, and with the expulsion of the Long Parliament in 1653 moved back to his family seat at Owthorpe near Nottingham and lived in retirement until 1659 when he was made High Sheriff of Nottinghamshire.

His neighbours thought of electing him to the First Protectorate Parliament in 1656, but Major-general Whalley's influence induced them to change their minds. According to his wife Lucy Hutchinson, Cromwell attempted to persuade her husband to accept office, "and, finding him too constant to be wrought upon to serve his tyranny", would have arrested him had not death prevented the fulfilment of his purpose.

The certificate presented in Hutchinson's favour after the Restoration represents him as secretly serving the royalist cause during the Protectorate, but of this, there is no independent evidence of this. The real object of his political action seems to have been the restoration of the Long parliament. He took his seat again in that assembly when the army recalled it to power (May 1659), and when John Lambert expelled it (October 1659) and prepared to restore its authority by arms, he secretly raised men, and concerted with Francis Hacker and others to assist George Monck and Arthur Hesilrige against Lambert and his party, In his place in parliament he opposed the intended oath abjuring the Stuarts, voted for the re-admission of the secluded members, and followed the lead of Monck and Cooper, in the belief that they were in favour of a Commonwealth. He retained sufficient popularity to be returned to the Convention Parliament as one of the members for Nottingham, but was expelled from it on 9 June 1660 as a regicide. On the same day he was made incapable of bearing any office or place of public trust in the kingdom, but it was agreed that he should not be excepted from the Act of Indemnity either for life or estate. In his petitions he confessed himself "involved in so horrid a crime as merits no indulgence", but pleaded his early, real, and constant repentance, arising from "a thorough conviction" of his "former misled judgment and conscience", not from a regard for his own safety. Thanks to this submission, to the influence of his kinsmen, Lord Byron and Sir Allen Apsley, to the fact that he was not considered dangerous, and that he had to a certain extent forwarded the Restoration, Hutchinson escaped the fate of most of the other regicides. Yet, as his wife owns, "he was not very well satisfied in himself for accepting the deliverance. … While he saw others suffer, he suffered with them in his mind, and, had not his wife persuaded him, had offered himself a voluntary sacrifice".

In October 1663 Hutchinson was arrested on suspicion of being concerned in what was known as the Farnley Wood Plot. The evidence against him was far from conclusive, but the government appears to have been eager to seize the opportunity of imprisoning him. Imprisonment restored Hutchinson's peace of mind. He regarded it as freeing him from his former obligations to the government, and refused to purchase his release by fresh engagements. During his confinement in the Tower of London, he was treated with great severity by the governor, Sir John Robinson, and threatened in return to publish an account of his malpractices and extortions. He even succeeded in getting a narrative of his own arrest and usage in the Tower printed, which is stated on the title page to be "written by himself on the 6th of April 1664, having then received intimation that he was to be sent away to another prison, and therefore he thought fit to print this for the satisfying his relations and friends of his innocence".

A warrant for Hutchinson's transportation to the Isle of Man was prepared in April 1664, but he was finally transferred to Sandown Castle in Kent on 3 May 1664. The castle was ruinous and unhealthy, and he died of a fever four months after his removal to it on 11 September 1664. His wife obtained permission to bury his body at St Margaret's Church, Owthorpe.

== Assessment ==
In the opinion of the historian C. H. Firth that Hutchinson's defence of Nottingham was a service of great value to the parliamentary cause, but his subsequent career in Parliament and the Council of State shows no sign of political ability. His fame rests on his wife's (Lucy Hutchinson) detailed biography of his life and commemoration of his character, not on his own achievements.

== Family ==
He was married to Lucy, daughter of Sir Allen Apsley, Lord Lieutenant of the Tower of London. John and Lucy had nine children, including John and Barbara.

His wife was the author of his biography: Memoirs of the life of colonel Hutchinson. Although the book was not published until several years after her death, she had known many of the people in that conflict and was in an ideal position to chronicle the events of the war.
