= Richard Byron =

Richard Byron may refer to:

- Richard Byron, 2nd Baron Byron (1606–1679), English Royalist during the English Civil War
- Richard Byron, 12th Baron Byron (1899–1989), British peer and British Army officer
- Richard Byron (Royal Navy officer) (1769–1837), British naval officer
- Carlotta (performer) (Richard Byron, born 1943), Australia cabaret performer and television celebrity
