= Robert Byron =

Robert Byron may refer to:

- Sir Robert Byron (Royalist) (1611–1673), Anglo-Irish soldier, member of parliament for Ardee in the Irish House of Commons
- Robert Byron (travel writer) (1905–1941), British travel writer, art critic, and historian, best known for his travelogue The Road to Oxiana
- Robert Byron (cricketer) (1910–1952), South African cricketer
- Red Byron (Robert Nold Byron, 1915–1960), NASCAR driver
- Robert Byron, 13th Baron Byron (born 1950), British peer and barrister
