= Lucy Hutchinson =

English translator and poet (1620–1681)

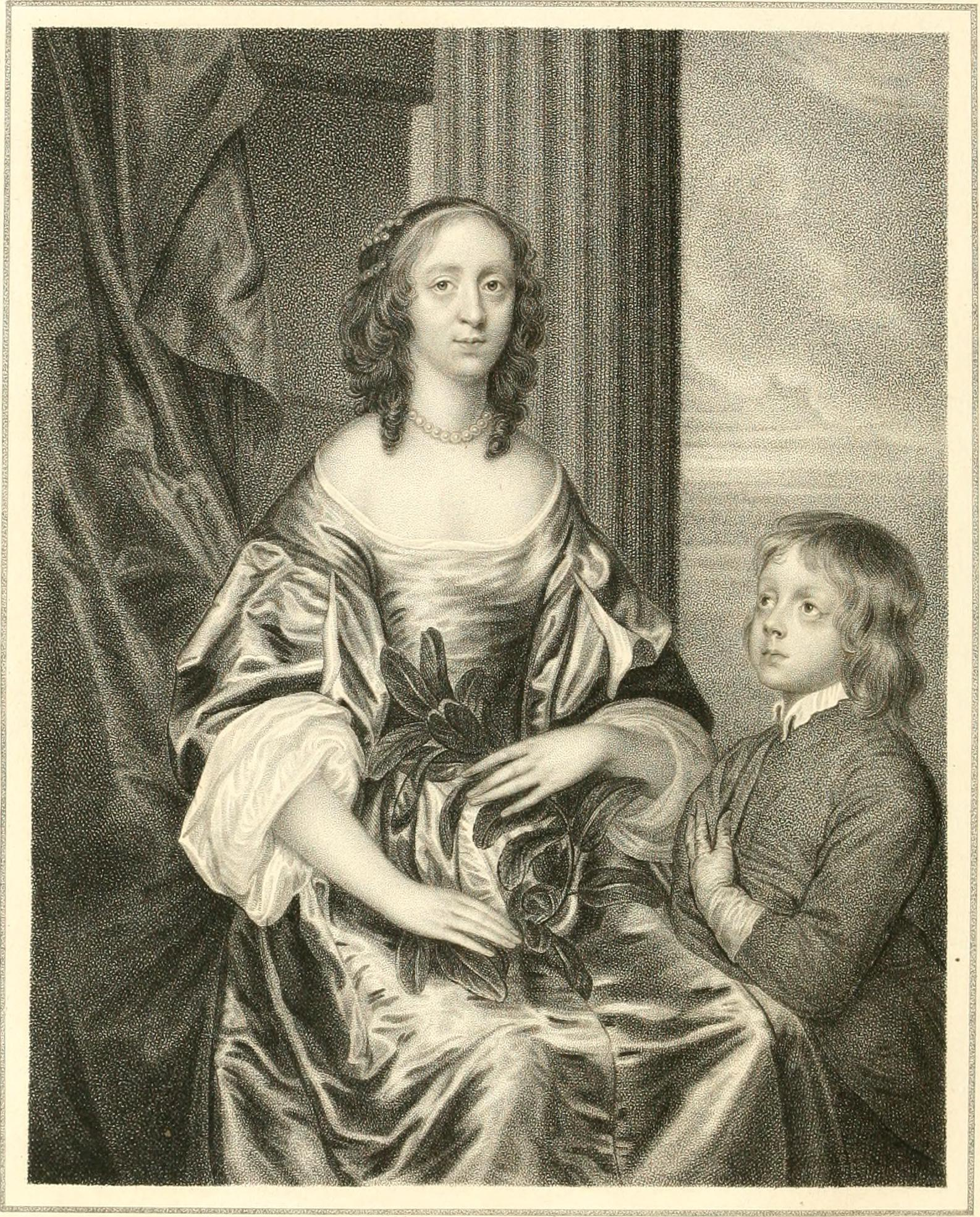
- engraving after portrait by Robert Walker
- Born: 29 January 1620; London
- Died: October 1681
- Occupations: Writer, biographer, medical doctor, poet
- Spouse: John Hutchinson
- Parents: Allen Apsley (father); Lucy St. John (mother)
- Relatives: Allen Apsley

Lucy Hutchinson (née Apsley; 29 January 1620 – October 1681) was an English translator, poet, and biographer, and the first person to translate the complete text of Lucretius's De rerum natura (On the Nature of Things) into English verse, during the years of the Interregnum (1649–1660).

== Biography ==
Lucy Apsley was born on 29 January 1620 in the Tower of London, where her father, Sir Allen Apsley, was Lieutenant. She was named after her mother, Lady Lucy St John, and was the second of ten children.

Lucy was married on 3 July 1638 in St Andrew Holborn to Colonel John Hutchinson (1615–1664). She claimed that he was in part attracted to her intellectual and poetic accomplishments. In 1649, John Hutchinson was one of the signatories of King Charles's death-warrant, but he later protested against the assumption of supreme power by Oliver Cromwell.

After the Restoration of the monarchy in 1660, her husband was arrested for his part in the execution of Charles I and imprisoned in Sandown Castle, Kent. However, he was not tried. Lucy went before the House of Lords to gain his release, but to no avail. In 1664, John Hutchinson died in prison. His death deeply affected her and her writing, as attested by her "Elegies" series of poems.

Lucy was an ardent Puritan, and she held fast to her Calvinist convictions. She died at Owthorpe, Nottinghamshire, in October 1681, and was buried in her husband's vault in St Margaret's Church, Owthorpe.

== Literary works ==
Lucy Hutchinson has a place in literary history for her biography of her husband, Memoirs of the Life of Colonel Hutchinson, in addition to her works in poetry and translation.

=== Biography ===
Memoirs of the Life of Colonel Hutchinson throws light upon the characteristics and conditions of the life of Puritans during the English Civil War. Intended for her family only, it was printed by a descendant in 1806, and became a popular and influential account of that period. In the book, she records that John Hutchinson had many notable victories in the Civil War, including at Shelford Manor on 27 October 1645. In this battle he defeated his kinsman, Colonel Philip Stanhope, the fifth son of the 1st Earl of Chesterfield. Lucy may have even seen the battle, as their estate of Owthorpe was only a few miles away.

=== Translation ===
Lucy Hutchinson is the first named translator of the full text of Lucretius's De rerum natura into English verse. She is likely to have begun her translation during the 1650s. In 1675 she dedicated a manuscript copy of the translation to acquaintance and literary patron Arthur Annesley, earl of Anglesey, repudiating the work and declaring it to be in conflict with her Puritan values. This manuscript was sold to the British Library by his heirs in 1853; however, it did not at first attract much attention. Her title as first English translator of the De rerum natura is challenged by an anonymous manuscript prose translation, likely of the same decade, now preserved at Oxford (Bodleian MS Rawl. D.314). Hutchinson's translation was published for the first time in 1996 under the editorship of Hugh de Quehen. It was republished in a comprehensive edition by Oxford University Press in 2018.

=== Poetry ===
A series of original poems by Hutchinson was re-discovered in a manuscript in the Nottinghamshire Archives (DD/Hu 2) by David Norbrook. This work is likely contemporaneous in composition with the Memoirs. This manuscript, referred to as the "Elegies", contains 23 numbered poems. Throughout her poems, Hutchinson lamented her husband's death, honoured his life, and moved toward an acceptance of his death, while commenting on the English political structure following the Restoration. These poems were unpublished in her lifetime and the manuscript, which is not in her hand, has no dedication.

Hutchinson's other works included Order and Disorder, arguably the first epic poem written by a woman in the English language. The work is a verse paraphrase of the Book of Genesis, offering parallels to John Milton's Paradise Lost. Only five cantos of the work were published during her lifetime, in 1679. In 2001 the critic David Norbrook published the work in full; he considers it to have been written after the translation of De rerum natura and roughly parallel to when Milton is thought to have written Paradise Lost (1660–1664). Hutchinson also wrote On the Principles of the Christian Religion, an articulation of the Puritan beliefs of herself and her husband. It was dedicated to her daughter Barbara and likely intended as a work of religious instruction. The work was posthumously published in 1817.

=== Other works ===
Amongst her other religious writings is a translation of Congregationalist divine John Owen's work Theologoumena Pantodapa.

== Family ==
John and Lucy Hutchinson had nine children.
