= Michael Byron =

Michael Byron may refer to:

- Michael Byron (footballer) (born 1987), English footballer
- Michael J. Byron (artist) (born 1954), visual artist
- Michael J. Byron (general) (born 1941), United States Marine Corps general
