= Charles Hutchinson (Nottingham MP) =

English Member of Parliament, served under King William III

MP for Nottingham
- In office 1690 – 3 November 1695

Personal details
- Born: 15 June 1636 Owthorpe, Nottinghamshire, England
- Died: 3 November 1695 (aged 59)
- Party: Whig
- Spouse: Isabella Boteler
- Children: Julius Hutchinson (b. ca. 1665 – d. 1730); Catherine Hutchinson; Norton Hutchinson; Elizabeth Hutchinson (b. ca. 1668 – d. 10 March 1734)
- Parent(s): Sir Thomas Hutchinson; Lady Catherine Stanhope
- Education: Brasenose, Oxford
- Occupation: Politician
- Known for: Advocacy for the East India trade, religious minorities, and government expenditure
- Committees: Commissioner of Public Accounts (1694–1695)

Charles Hutchinson (15 June 1636 – 3 November 1695) was an English politician and Member of Parliament (MP) for Nottingham from 1690 until his death in 1695. A prominent member of the Whig party, he served under King William III and was known for his roles in financial governance and legislative activism.

== Early life and family background ==
Charles Hutchinson was baptized on 15 June 1636 in Owthorpe, Nottinghamshire. He was the third son of Sir Thomas Hutchinson and his second wife, Lady Catherine Stanhope. Lady Catherine was a daughter of Sir John Stanhope and half-sister to Philip Stanhope, 1st Earl of Chesterfield. The Hutchinson family were a minor but established branch of an ancient Yorkshire lineage that had relocated to Owthorpe, Nottinghamshire, around the turn of the 15th century. Hutchinson received his education at Brasenose College, Oxford in 1653.

== Political career ==
Hutchinson's political career was inaugurated under challenging circumstances during the Exclusion Crisis. He was indicted and fined 200 marks for riotous conduct at the Nottingham mayoral election of 1682. However, he recovered from this setback, being appointed as a Justice of the Peace (j.p.) and a Commissioner for recusancy fines in Nottinghamshire, Derbyshire, and Lincolnshire in March 1688.

During the regime change from James II to William of Orange, Hutchinson adopted a supportive but non-combatant role. He supplied weapons and horses to the forces commanded by the Earl of Devonshire, William Cavendish.

In 1690, he was elected as MP for Nottingham, a position he held until his death on 3 November 1695. During his parliamentary tenure, he was deeply involved in debates over the East India trade, legislation concerning religious minorities, and government expenditure. He was appointed a Commissioner of Public Accounts in 1694, serving until his death in 1695.

== Marriage and family ==
Hutchinson married Isabella Boteler, daughter of Sir Francis Boteler. They had several children, only a few of whom survived to adulthood.

== Offices held ==
- Commissioner for recusancy fines, Notts., Derbys., Lincs. (1688)
- Guardian, Plumptre Hosp. (1693–d.)
- Commissioner of Public Accounts (1694–1695)

== Death and legacy ==
Charles Hutchinson died unexpectedly on 3 November 1695. His contributions to financial governance and legislative activism were noted in his lifetime and documented in subsequent historical accounts.
