= James Byron =

James Byron may refer to:

- James Byron (writer), author of TNT for Two, one half of an Ace double novel
- Jim Byron (publicist), American 1950s and 1960s era publicist
- Jim Byron (nonprofit executive)

== See also ==
- Paul Byron (James Paul Byron, born 1989), Canadian ice hockey player
