= Allen Apsley (Royalist) =

English politician 1616–1683

Sir Allen Apsley
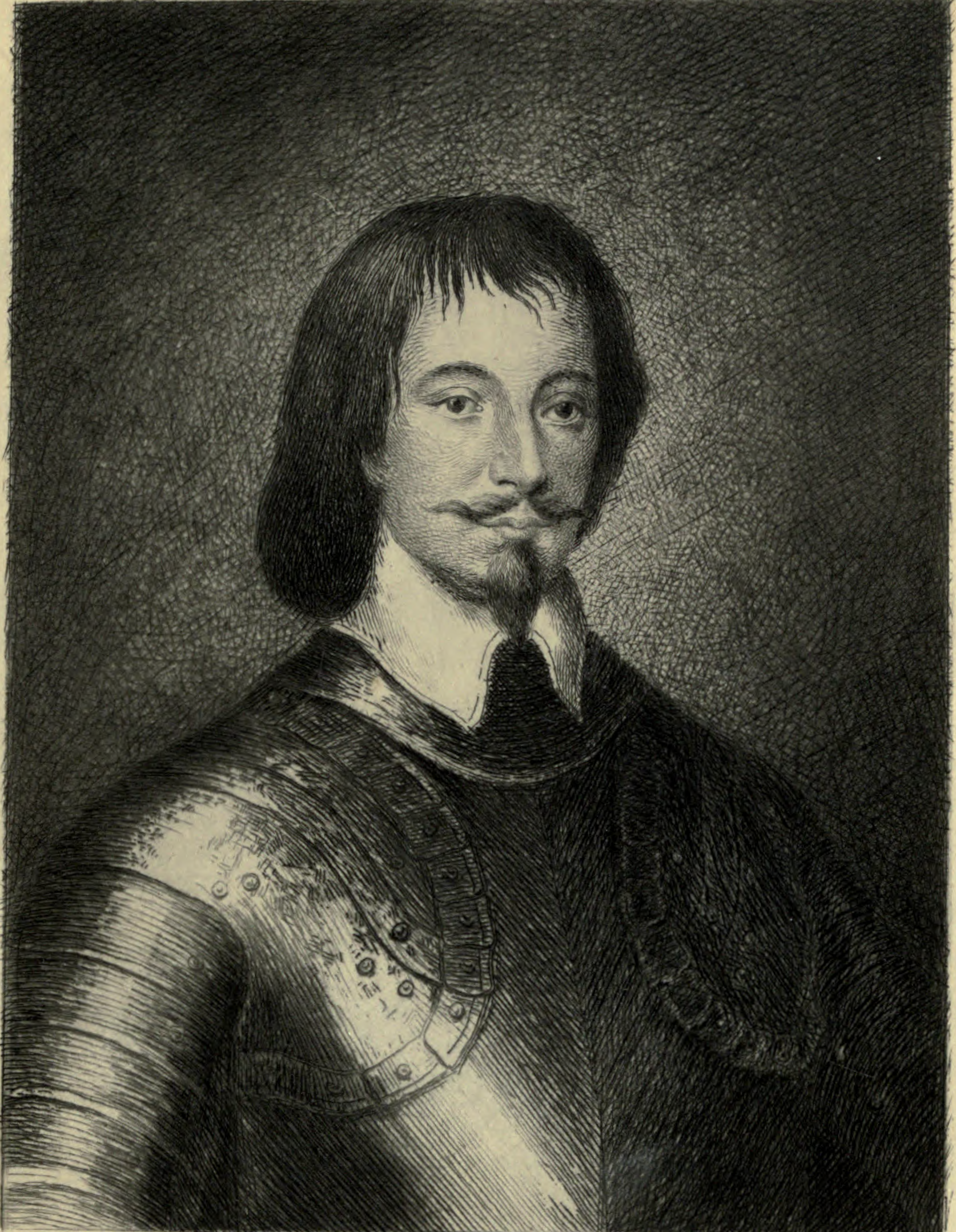

Member of Parliament for Thetford
- In office May 1661 – January 1679

Master of the Hawks
- In office 1660–1675

Royalist Governor of Barnstaple
- In office May 1645 – April 1646

Royalist Lieutenant-Governor of Exeter
- In office December 1642 – April 1645

Personal details
- Born: 28 August 1616 East Smithfield
- Died: 15 October 1683 (aged 67) St James's Square
- Resting place: Westminster Abbey
- Party: Royalist
- Spouse: Frances Petre (1645-his death)
- Children: Frances (1653–1727), Isabella (after 1697), Peter (after 1691)
- Education: Trinity College, Oxford
- Occupation: Soldier and politician

Military service
- Allegiance: England
- Rank: Colonel
- Battles/wars: Wars of the Three Kingdoms; 1643 Siege of Exeter; Langport; Siege of Barnstaple; Second Anglo-Dutch War; Battle of Lowestoft

Sir Allen Apsley (28 August 1616 – 15 October 1683) was an English landowner who was a Royalist soldier and administrator during the Wars of the Three Kingdoms. Following the 1660 Stuart Restoration, he took part in the Second Anglo-Dutch War, and sat as MP for Thetford from 1661 to 1679. One biographer describes him as having an "ability to maintain friendly contact with figures across a wide range of affiliations, which helped to make him a successful political fixer".

Born in London, his family came from West Sussex, an area solidly Parliamentarian at the outbreak of the First English Civil War in August 1642. As a result, Apsley spent most of it in Devon, serving as deputy governor of Exeter from 1643 to 1645, then governor of Barnstaple until the war ended in 1646. This brought him into close contact with senior figures including Queen Henrietta Maria of France, Charles II and Clarendon, connections which became important in later years.

His younger sister Lucy was married to the Parliamentarian John Hutchinson, who used his influence to obtain Apsley favourable terms for regaining his estates. In return, he avoided involvement in Royalist conspiracies during the Protectorate, and after the Restoration in May 1660, Apsley intervened to save Hutchinson from execution as a regicide.

He became treasurer for James, Duke of York, and his political manager in the Commons until losing office in 1679. He died in October 1683 and was buried in Westminster Abbey.

== Personal details ==
Allen Apsley was born 28 August 1616 in East Smithfield, eldest son of Sir Allen Apsley (1567–1630), then Surveyor of Marine Victuals, and his third wife Lucy St John (1600–1659). His mother's family owned lands in Wiltshire and Ireland, and were connected to George Villiers, 1st Duke of Buckingham, the favourite of both James VI and I and his son Charles I.

With Buckingham's help, Apsley's father was appointed Lieutenant of the Tower of London in 1617, but left huge debts when he died in May 1630. This resulted in a series of bitter property disputes, which since Apsley was a Royal ward until 1637, often had to be settled by Charles himself.

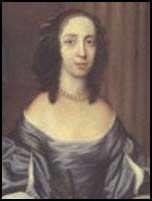
Apsley's Puritan sister Lucy, author of a famous first hand account of the war

Apsley's younger sister Lucy (1620–1681) married John Hutchinson, later a Parliamentarian officer. Her work 'The life of John Hutchinson' remains one of the most important first hand accounts of the First English Civil War. In addition, he had a younger brother James (1622 – after 1665) and sister Barbara (1625–?), who married George Hutchinson (1618–1691). He also had a half brother and sister from his father's previous marriage to Anne Carew, Peter (1603 – after 1663), and Joyce (1605–1663).

In 1645, Apsley married Frances Petre (died 1698), from Bouhay in Devon, and they had three children who survived into adulthood; Frances (1653–1727), Isabella (died after 1697) and Peter (died after 1691).

== Wars of the Three Kingdoms ==
Along with his brother James, Apsley was educated at Merchant Taylors' School and attended the Inner Temple, before graduating from Trinity College, Oxford in 1631. He was present in Nottingham when Charles declared war on Parliament in August 1642, and commanded a troop of horse under Lord Byron at Edgehill in October. Like many families, the Apsleys were divided by the conflict, although the majority were Royalists. These included Sir Peter Apsley, owner of the main family estates in West Sussex, and his brother John, while the St Johns and Carews were among the most prominent Royalists in Wiltshire and Devon respectively. A few supported Parliament, among them two future regicides, John Carew and Allen's brother-in-law John Hutchinson, who was also Lord Byron's nephew.

Apsley's England; key locations

Apsley was made deputy to John Berkeley, appointed Royalist governor of Exeter shortly before it was attacked in December 1642, although the city did not fall until September 1643. Promoted colonel in February 1643, he raised a cavalry regiment which later formed part of the Exeter and Barnstaple garrisons, with his younger brother James as lieutenant colonel. (Note: This unit is often confused with that recruited by John Apsley which occupied Winchester in October 1643 and fought at Cheriton in March 1644. John served with Lord Goring in the first of the Bishops Wars in 1639; in July 1641, he was present at the siege of Gennep in the Dutch Republic. By 1644, "Colonel Apisley's regiment" was listed as part of the third tertia of the Oxford field army.)

His position in Exeter brought Apsley into close contact with Queen Henrietta Maria of France, who spent much of 1644 there, as did the Prince of Wales and Clarendon after January 1645. He was appointed Governor of Barnstaple in April 1645 but the last significant Royalist armies were destroyed at Naseby in June and Langport in July. Accompanied by Clarendon, the Prince of Wales went into exile in March 1646 and on 30 March Barnstaple was besieged by the New Model Army. Sir Thomas Fairfax later recorded "Sir Allen Apsley is willing to surrender the town but his desperate brother (James) swears he will cut him to pieces if he surrenders the castle". Notwithstanding, they capitulated on 13 April, and Apsley went to stay with his sisters and brothers-in-law in Nottingham.

Hutchinson used his influence with the Committee for Compounding with Delinquents to help Apsley regain his estates on extremely favourable terms. In return, he carried messages from the Army to Charles, then being held by the Scots in Newcastle, and was knighted by him in October 1646. After the execution of Charles in January 1649, he avoided involvement in Royalist conspiracies in order not to compromise his brother-in-law, although in 1651 his brother James allegedly tried to assassinate Oliver St John, Commonwealth ambassador to the Dutch Republic. He remained on good terms with Clarendon and Charles II, while his cousin Allen Broderick provided them useful intelligence on political affairs in the late 1650s.

== The Restoration and after ==
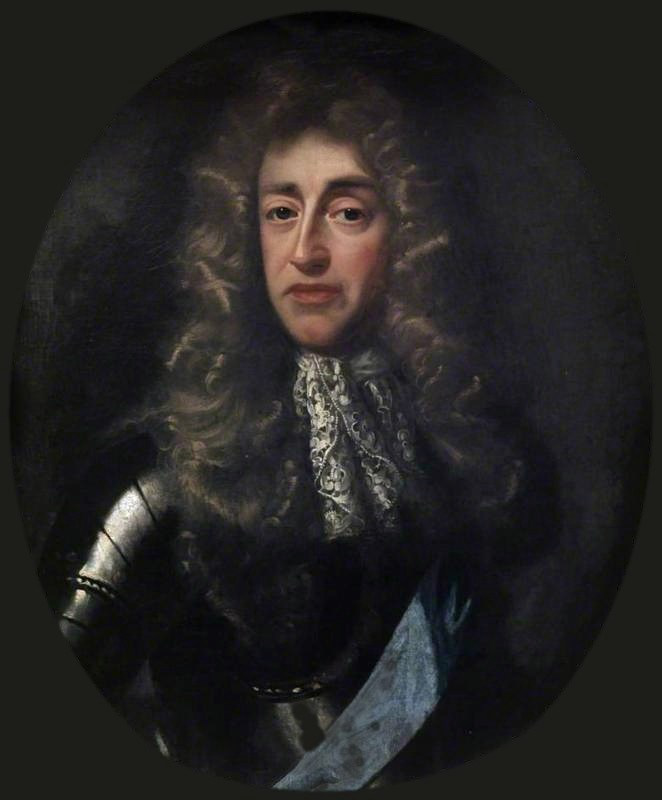
James, Duke of York circa 1665; Apsley was a member of his household and political manager in the Commons

After the May 1660 Stuart Restoration, Apsley benefitted from his relationship with John Berkeley, now head of household for James, Duke of York. He was appointed Master of the Hawks, a position worth over £1,250 a year, Cofferer of the Household to James, and was elected MP for Thetford to the Cavalier Parliament in 1661. James' marriage to Clarendon's daughter Anne Hyde created a political alliance between the two men; Apsley and his cousin Allen acted as their political managers in the Commons, although diarist and naval administrator Samuel Pepys recorded they often arrived drunk.

Another more pressing family issue was the arrest of John Hutchinson and other regicides by the Convention Parliament in May 1660. Apsley's distant relative John Carew was one of those hung, drawn and quartered in October but he helped ensure Hutchinson was released without charge. Given the vengeful nature of Parliament towards the regicides, this was a considerable achievement; his sister Lucy wrote it was his "interest and most fervent endeavours only which turn'd the scales". Hutchinson was re-arrested in 1663 and charged with involvement in a "Papist plot"; since he was well known to be a devout Puritan this was recognised as highly unlikely, but Apsley was unable to have him freed and he died in prison in September 1664.

When the Second Anglo-Dutch War began in 1665, James was appointed commander of the Royal Navy and Apsley accompanied him on board his flagship the "Royal James" at the Battle of Lowestoft. The war ended in 1667 with the humiliating Raid on the Medway and forced a series of cost-saving measures, reducing the income Apsley received from his various positions. In partial compensation, he was appointed secretary to the Royal African Company, established to challenge the Dutch dominance of the slave trade and whose principal shareholders included Charles and James.

He remained a supporter of James throughout the disputes over his conversion to Catholicism but was not re-elected in March 1679, making him the last member of his family to sit in Parliament. The epic poem "Order and Disorder", published anonymously in 1679 during the Exclusion Crisis, was for many years attributed to Apsley but is now considered the work of his sister Lucy. He died at his home in St James's Square on 15 October 1683 and was buried two days later in Westminster Abbey.

== Sources ==
- Allen Apsley. "Will of Sir Allen Apsley, Lieutenant of His Majesty's Tower of London 14 May 1631 PROB 11/159". Our Family History.
- Allen Apsley. "Colonel Allen Apsley's Regiment of Horse". BCW.
- John Apsley. "Colonel John Apsley's Regiment of Horse". BCW.
- Cruickshanks, Eveline (1983). "Apsley, Sir Allen (1616–83), of St. James's Square, Westminster". In Henning, B.D. (ed.). The History of Parliament: the House of Commons 1660–1690. Boydell & Brewer.
- De Beer, E.S (1959). The Diary of John Evelyn; a selection (2006 ed.). Everyman's Library. ISBN 1-85715-291-3.
- Hankey, Julia (1889). History of the Apsley & Bathurst families. EW Savory. OCLC 504774652.
- "Lord Byron's Regiment of Horse". BCW.
- Norbrook, David (2004). "Hutchinson [née Apsley], Lucy". Oxford Dictionary of National Biography (online ed.). Oxford University Press. doi:10.1093/ref:odnb/14285. (Subscription, Wikipedia Library access or UK public library membership required.)
- Pepys, Samuel (22 August 2010). "Thursday 22 August 1667". Pepys Diary.
- Royle, Trevor (2004). Civil War: The Wars of the Three Kingdoms 1638–1660 (2006 ed.). Abacus. ISBN 978-0-349-11564-1.
- Seaward, Paul (2004). "Apsley, Sir Allen". Oxford Dictionary of National Biography (online ed.). Oxford University Press. doi:10.1093/ref:odnb/600. (Subscription, Wikipedia Library access or UK public library membership required.)
- "Sir Allen Apsley". Westminster Abbey.
- Young, Peter (1939). "King Charles I's army of 1643–1645". Journal of the Society for Army Historical Research. 18 (69): 27–37. JSTOR 44219782.

Court offices
New title	Master of the Hawks; 1660–1675	Succeeded by Charles Beauclerk
Parliament of England
Preceded by Sir Philip Wodehouse, Bt. and Robert Paston	Member of Parliament for Thetford; 1661–1679; With: William Gawdy 1661–69, Sir Joseph Williamson from 1669	Succeeded by Sir Joseph Williamson and William Harbord
