= Master of the Hawks =

The office of Master of the Hawks (or Master Falconer) was created on the English Restoration in 1660. During Charles II's reign, the Master's salary was £390 per annum (approximately £42,000 in 2007); in William III's reign, it was increased to £1500 (approximately £161,900 in 2007). The office was abolished on the accession of Anne in 1702 and the master, the Duke of St Albans, was granted a perpetual pension payable to his heirs. The pension was finally commuted in 1891 by the payment of a lump sum of some £18,000.

== Masters of the Hawks ==
- 1660–1675: Sir Allen Apsley
- 1675–1702: Charles Beauclerk (Earl of Burford from 1676 and Duke of St Albans from 1684).

== Deputy Masters of the Hawks ==
- 1675–? Sir Thomas Felton, 4th Baronet and William Chiffinch
