= John Byron (died 1600) =

English nobleman, landowner, politician and knight

Sir John Byron
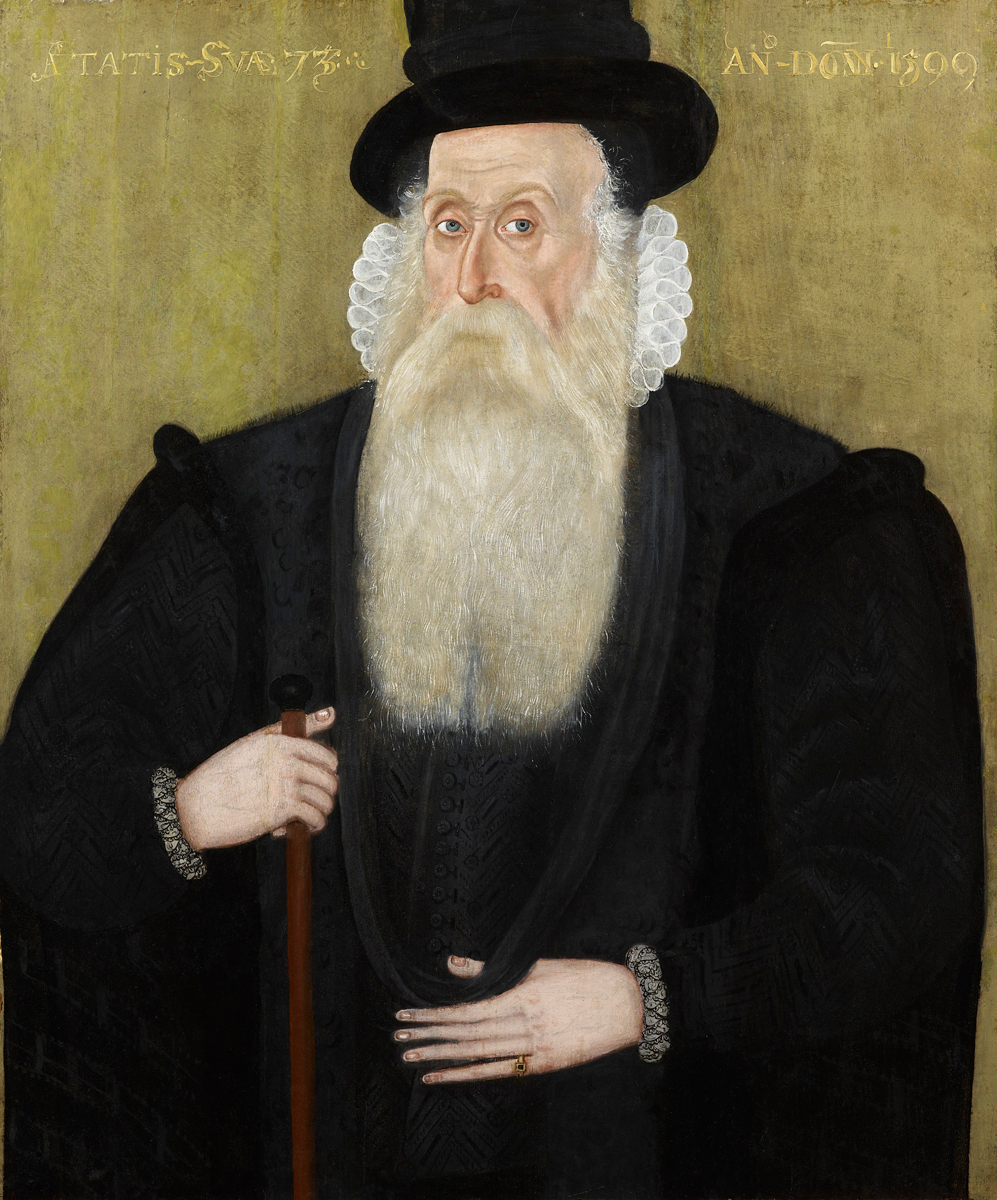
- Sir John Byron in 1599, unknown artist.
- Born: c. 1526; Colwick, Nottinghamshire
- Died: 1600 (aged 74); Colwick, Nottingham
- Noble family: Byron
- Spouse: Alice Strelley
- Issue: John Byron; Anthony Byron; Elizabeth Byron; Isabel Byron; Ann Byron; Mary Byron; Alice Byron; Margaret Byron
- Father: John Byron
- Mother: Elizabeth Costerdine

Sir John Byron (c. 1526 – 1600) was an Elizabethan English nobleman, landowner, politician, and knight. He was also known as Little Sir John with the Great Beard.

== Life and family ==
Byron was the son of John Byron by his second wife, Elizabeth Costerdine and lived at Clayton Hall, Manchester, and later Royton, both then in Lancashire and later still at Newstead Abbey in Nottinghamshire, which he inherited from his father.

He was High Sheriff of Lancashire in 1572 and High Sheriff of Nottinghamshire in 1596. He was knighted by Queen Elizabeth I of England in 1579.

== Marriage and issue ==
Byron married Alice Strelley, a daughter of Sir Nicholas Strelley of Strelley, with whom he had three sons and six daughters. His eldest son was Anthony, who died before him in 1587, and thus he was succeeded by his son Sir John Byron (died 1623). His daughter Elizabeth married John Atherton. His granddaughter Margaret married to Sir Thomas Hutchinson of Owthorpe, Nottinghamshire.
