= Nicholas Byron =

English nobleman (1416–1503)

Sir Nicholas Byron
- Born: 1416; Clayton, Lancashire
- Died: 1503 (aged 87); Colwick, Nottinghamshire
- Noble family: Byron
- Spouse: Joan Bushler
- Issue: John Byron; Elizabeth Byron; Ellen Byron; Jane Byron; Dorothy Byron; Mary Byron
- Father: John Byron
- Mother: Margery Booth

Sir Nicholas Byron (1416–1503) was an English nobleman, politician, and knight.

== Family ==
Byron was the son of John Byron, and his wife, Margery Booth. He was created a Knight of the Bath by Arthur, Prince of Wales on the occasion of Prince Arthur's marriage on 14 November 1501.

== Marriage and issue ==
Sir Nicholas married Joan Bushler, daughter of Sir John Bushler of Haugham, Lincolnshire and Elizabeth Berkeley, with whom he had five daughters and two sons, including John Byron. Joan survived her husband and married Sir Gervase Clifton of Clifton, Nottingham.
