= Thomas Hutchinson (MP) =

English Member of Parliament

Sir Thomas Hutchinson

MP for Nottinghamshire
- In office 1626–1643

High Sheriff of Nottinghamshire
- Incumbent
- Assumed office 1620

Personal details
- Born: 4 September 1589 Owthorpe, Nottinghamshire
- Died: 18 August 1643 London
- Resting place: St Paul's, Covent Garden
- Spouse(s): Lady Margaret Byron; Lady Catherine Stanhope
- Children: John Hutchinson (colonel); George Hutchinson; Charles Hutchinson (M.P.); Stanhope Hutchinson; Isabella Hutchinson
- Parent(s): Thomas Hutchinson of Cropwell Butler; Lady Jane Sacheverell
- Education: University of Cambridge, Pembroke College, Cambridge; Gray's Inn
- Occupation: Politician

Sir Thomas Hutchinson (4 September 1589 – 18 August 1643) was an English politician notable for his service as a Member of Parliament (MP) for Nottinghamshire. He held this position from 1626 until his death in 1643.

== Early life and education ==
Thomas Hutchinson was born on 4 September 1589 in Owthorpe, Nottinghamshire. He was the only son of Thomas Hutchinson of Cropwell, Notts, and Jane, the daughter and heir of Henry Sacheverell of Radcliffe-upon-Soar, Notts. Hutchinson inherited his estate as a minor in 1599, and his early years were marked by a violent altercation with his guardian, Sir German Pole, in February 1613. Pole ambushed Hutchinson and cut off two or three of his fingers, but Hutchinson wrestled with him and bit off part of Pole's nose, which Hutchinson carried off in his pocket. Despite the adversity, he gained substantial respect and glory for his honorable conduct during the incident, according to his daughter-in-law.

Hutchinson was educated at Pembroke College, Cambridge, in 1606, followed by legal studies at Gray's Inn in 1609.

== Career and public service ==
Sir Thomas Hutchinson was knighted at Hitchinbrook in 1617 by King James I and appointed High Sheriff of Nottinghamshire in 1620. He was heavily involved in local governance, holding various commissions ranging from subsidies and sewers to charitable uses and sequestration. He was a Deputy Lieutenant of Nottinghamshire by 1637 and remained active in an array of administrative roles until his death.

His political career took off when he was elected as the Member of Parliament for Nottinghamshire in 1626. Hutchinson's parliamentary involvement was not limited to legislative affairs; he was actively involved in executing important missions for the King. Despite his Puritan leanings, he was a conformist to the Church of England and was not averse to the act of kneeling during communion.

== Personal life ==
Hutchinson married twice: first to Margaret, the daughter of Sir John Byron of Newstead Abbey, Notts, with whom he had three sons, one of whom died young; and secondly to Catherine, the daughter of Sir John Stanhope of Shelford, Notts, with whom he had one son and two daughters.

== Death and legacy ==
He died on 18 August 1643 in London and was buried at St. Paul's, Covent Garden. He was succeeded by his son John, who later gained notoriety as a regicide and also served as a Member of Parliament for Nottinghamshire.
