= Listed buildings in Owthorpe =

Owthorpe is a civil parish in the Rushcliffe district of Nottinghamshire, England. The parish contains eight listed buildings that are recorded in the National Heritage List for England. Of these, one is listed at Grade II*, the middle of the three grades, and the others are at Grade II, the lowest grade. The parish contains the village of Owthorpe and the surrounding countryside, and the listed buildings consist of a church, headstones in the churchyard, three mile markers on the Grantham Canal, a farmhouse and a pair of cottages.

== Key ==
Grade	Criteria
II*	Particularly important buildings of more than special interest
II	Buildings of national importance and special interest

== Buildings ==
Name and location	Photograph	Date	Notes	Grade
St Margaret's Church; 52.89424°N 1.00213°W		1705	The church was largely rebuilt using material from an earlier church on the site. It is in stone with a hipped tile roof, and consists of a rectangular nave and a west tower. The tower contains a west round-arch doorway with imposts and a keystone, above which are two angels holding a shield, and a clock face. Each bell opening has a square head and two round-arched lights containing Y-tracery, over which s a plain parapet between two moulded string courses. There is a similar parapet along the sides of the church, rising at the west end to meet the tower. The windows on the body of the church have pointed arches and contain Y-tracery, and the east window has three lights.	II*
Hall Farmhouse; 52.89422°N 1.00506°W		18th century	The farmhouse is in stone, with a dentilled eaves cornice, and a pantile roof with coped gables and kneelers. There are two storeys and a long range of three bays. The windows are tripartite casements, those in the ground floor with segmental heads.	II
Headstones south of St Margaret's Church; 52.89418°N 1.00218°W		18th century	The group of eleven headstones are mainly in slate, with one in limestone, and they carry various inscriptions and carved designs. The headstones are dated between 1700 and 1830.	II
Headstones west of the tower of St Margaret's Church; 52.89419°N 1.00241°W	—	18th century	The group of 16 headstones are in slate, and they carry various inscriptions and carved designs. The headstones are dated between 1727 and 1810.	II
9 3/4 mile post, Grantham Canal; 52.88942°N 0.98828°W		Late 18th century	The milepost is on the west side of the canal and is in cast iron. It consists of a post with a rounded top and a moulded edge, and in raised letters indicates the distance from the River Trent.	II
10 1/4 mile post, Grantham Canal; 52.88493°N 0.99283°W		Late 18th century	The milepost is on the south side of the canal and is in cast iron. It consists of a post with a rounded top and a moulded edge, and in raised letters indicates the distance from the River Trent.	II
10 3/4 mile post, Grantham Canal; 52.88099°N 1.00141°W		Late 18th century	The milepost is on the southeast side of the canal and is in cast iron. It consists of a post with a rounded top and a moulded edge, and in raised letters indicates the distance from the River Trent.	II
Hall Farm Cottage and adjoining cottage 52.89476°N 1.00499°W	—	Late 18th century	A pair of mirror-image cottages in brick with a hipped pantile roof. There are two storeys with a symmetrical front, and an extension with a porch at the rear. The doorway and the windows, which are tripartite casements, have segmental heads.	II
