= Allen Apsley (administrator) =

English merchant, courtier and landowner (1567–1630)

Sir Allen Apsley
- Born: 1567; London, England
- Died: 24 May 1630 (aged 62–63)
- Spouse: Lucy St John
- Children: Allen Apsley; Lucy Hutchinson
- Parent(s): Sir John Apsley; Elizabeth Shelly

Sir Allen Apsley (1567 – 24 May 1630) was an English merchant, courtier and landowner, lord of the manor of Feltwell, and Naval administrator. He was Surveyor of Marine Victuals of the Royal Navy from 1612 to 1630 and Lieutenant of the Tower of London in 1617.

== Biography ==
Born in London, Apsley was the son of the rich merchant Sir John Apsley in Pulborough, West Sussex, and the City of London, and his wife Elizabeth, daughter of Edward Shelly of Worminghurst, West Sussex.

Sir Allen Apsley was first knighted in Ireland, on 5 June 1605. On 31 January 1612 he was appointed joint Surveyor of Marine Victuals of the Royal Navy (with Sir Marmaduke Darrell) – a post usually held for life. On 3 March 1617 Apsley was appointed Lieutenant of the Tower of London by James I. Apsley's second wife, Anne, daughter of Sir Peter Carew, Knt., was related by marriage to the Villiers family, and Apsley was considered to have won the appointment through the influence of the King's favourite, George Villiers, 1st Duke of Buckingham.

In 1620, he was one of the founders of the New England Company. He died on 24 May 1630.

== Family ==
On 23 October 1615, at the City of London church of St Ann Blackfriars, Apsley married Lucy, a daughter of Sir John St John of Lydiard Tregoze, Wiltshire, and his wife Lucy (daughter of Sir Walter Hungerford (Knight of Farley)); and a sister of Sir John St John, 1st Baronet. They had two children:

- Allen (1616–1683), became a leading Royalist in the Civil War and a courtier of Charles II after the Restoration
- and Lucy (1620–1681), married John Hutchinson an officer in the New Model Army during the Civil War and the Commonwealth. Lucy wrote a biography of her husband's exploits and several other notable works.
