= Molly Byron =

Australian jazz musician

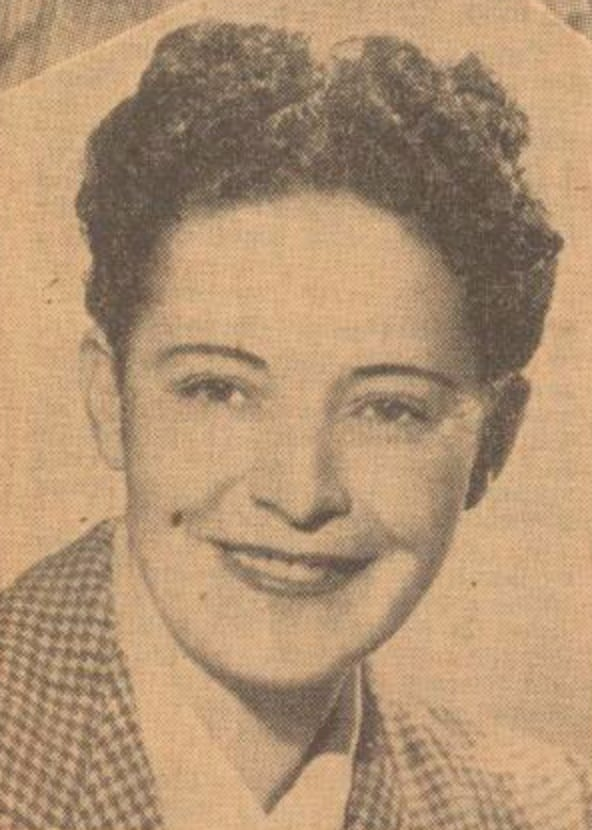
- Molly Byron 1948

Background information
- Also known as: Carolina Carrie, Nina
- Born: Mary Alice Byron; 1911; Fitzroy North, Victoria
- Died: 1975 (aged 63–64) Belgrave, Victoria

Mary Alice "Molly" Byron (sometimes written Mollie Byron) (1911-1975) was an Australian singer, musician, and male impersonator.

== Career ==
Mary Byron was born in Fitzroy North, Victoria in 1911. As a teenager, she began performing at the Tivoli Theatre, Melbourne as a male impersonator under her performer name Molly Byron. Then, at nineteen, she began broadcasting under the name Nina with Al Hammett's ABC Dance Band.

In the 1930s, she toured Australia as Molly Byron. She continued her act as a male impersonator during this time, and performed scat singing and blues.

During World War II, Byron led a 12-man jazz band who performed for American troops stationed around Victoria.

In 1945, Byron was making appearances on ABC Radio programs such as the Victory Show and Happy-Go-Lucky. Later, she led the Nine Off Beats, Australia's first "all-girl jazz band" in 1947. She sang and played bass, drums, and first trumpet. She also performed with a group known as her Slick Chicks. In 1946, Larry Crosby, Bing Crosby's brother, had offered Byron a contract in America, however she had turned it down.

Byron also performed on Melbourne radio station 3DB under the alias Carolina Carrie. Across her career she sang with Jim Davidson’s and Ern Pettifer’s orchestras, and Graeme Bell.

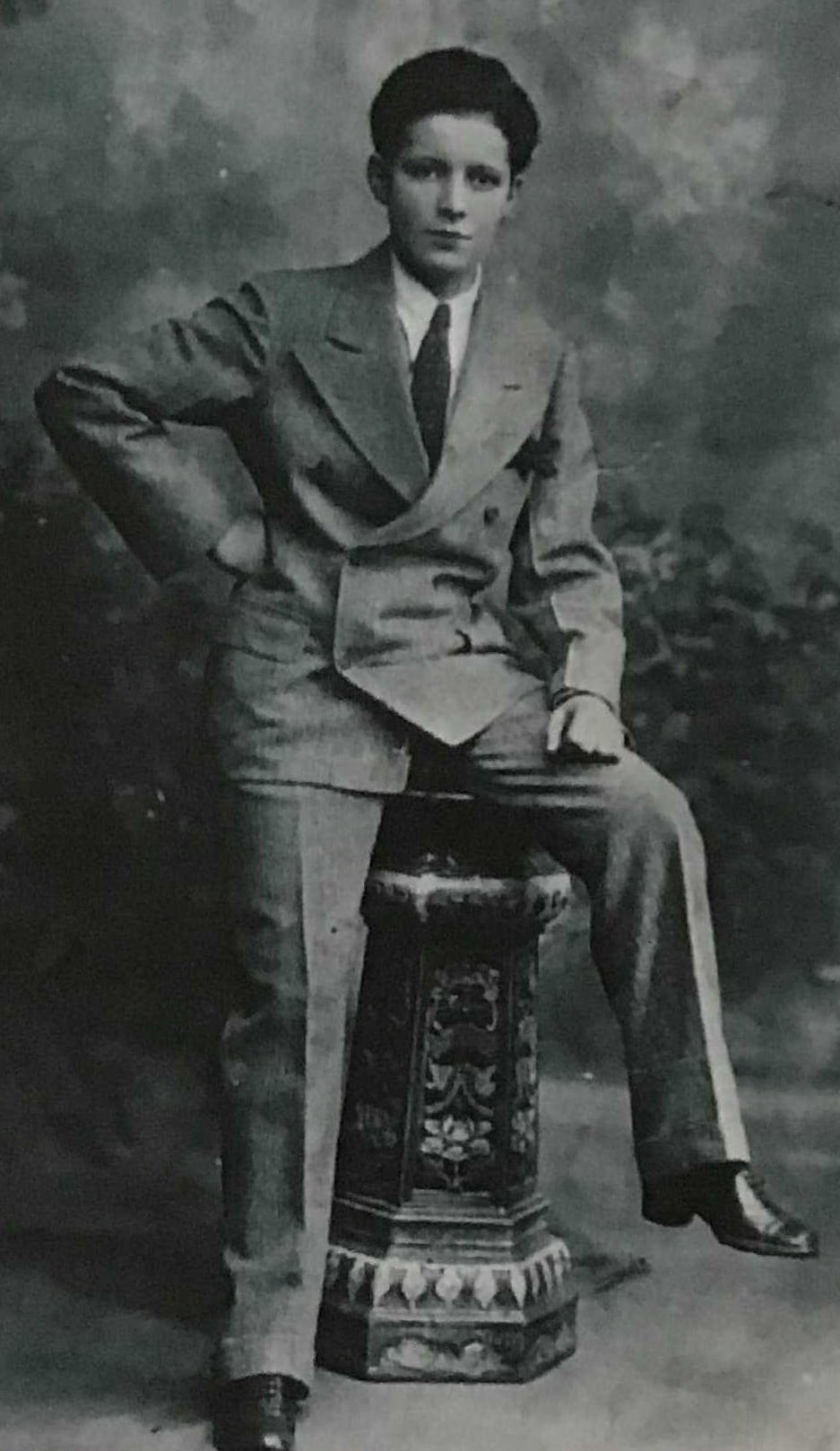
Molly Byron as a male impersonator c1934

Her brother James Norman Byron was an entertainer and composer. He had played for the Fitzroy Football Club and composed their Premiership Song for their win in 1944. Molly Byron and her brother composed the song When they find a Possie for the boys from Aussie to entertain troops during World War II.

Although she was said to have made recordings during World War II, these were taken back to America, and none are known to exist now.

Molly Byron died in 1975 in Belgrave, Victoria.
