= Angela Byron =

Developer of Drupal software

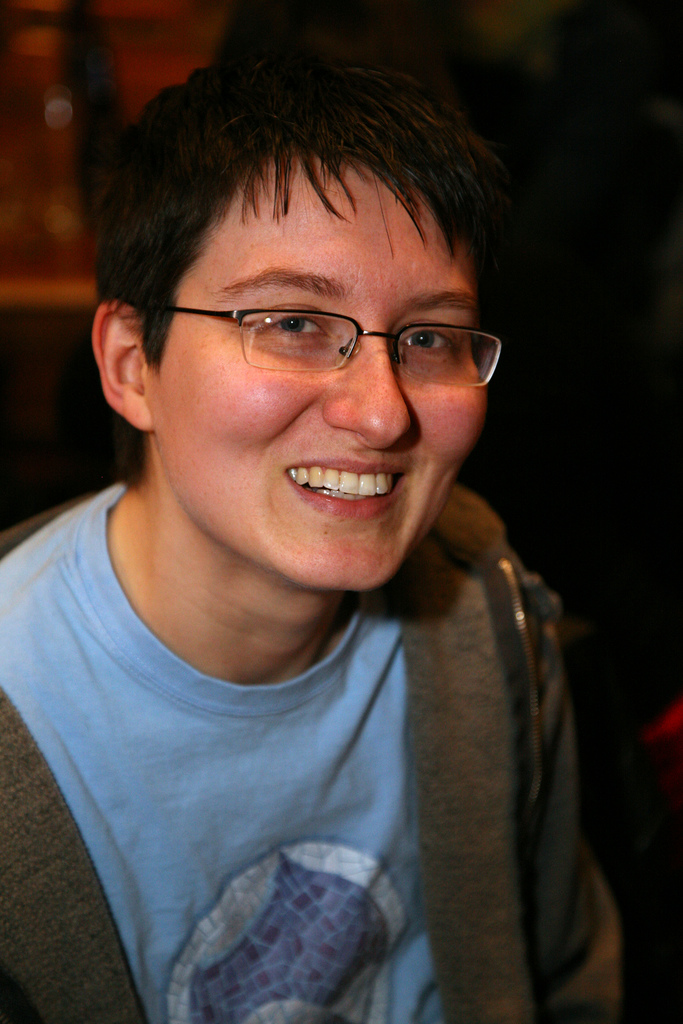
- Born: 1977 or 1978 (age 47–48); Rochester, Minnesota, United States
- Other names: Angie webchick
- Occupations: Co-maintainer of Drupal; Director of Community Development at Acquia
- Known for: Open source movement
- Board member of: Drupal Association
- Angela Byron's voice recorded in 2017
- Website: Webchick.net

Angela Byron (born 1977/8) is a Canadian software developer best known for her work with Drupal, a free and open source content management system and content management framework. She has been named one of the most highly regarded contributors to the open source movement, and has worked to encourage people to become involved with open source, particularly women. She was the first woman to be featured on the cover of Linux Journal, in April 2011.

== Personal life ==
Byron is mostly self-taught. She holds a two-year degree from the Nova Scotia Community College in information technology, concentrating on programming. She lives in British Columbia, Canada with her daughter.

== Career ==
At the advice of a professor, Byron applied to the Google Summer of Code in 2005. She was accepted, and participated by writing a quiz module for Drupal. This sparked her involvement with Drupal, as well as the open source movement as a whole.

In October 2006, Byron began working for Lullabot, a Drupal consulting company. In 2008, Byron was awarded the Google–O'Reilly Open Source Award for Best Contributor for her work on Drupal. She worked full-time for Lullabot until 2011, doing software training and working with system architecture. Part of her work for Lullabot also allowed her to work on Drupal developments and initiatives.

In 2008, she became the co-maintainer of the Drupal core, and she also worked on documentation and outreach. She led the project to create Using Drupal: Choosing and Configuring Modules to Build Dynamic Websites, a how-to book for Drupal users. She is also in charge of Drupal's involvement with the Google Summer of Code, as well as Google Highly Open Participation Contest. In 2011, she left Lullabot to work for Acquia, a software company that also provides products, services, and support for Drupal. She is the Director of Community Development.

== Works ==
- Byron, Angela; Berry, Addison; Robbins, Jeff; Haug, Nathan; Eaton, Jeff; Walker, James (2009). Using Drupal. O'Reilly Media, Inc. ISBN 9780596515805. "0596515804."
