= Frank Byron =

American politician

Member of New Hampshire House of Representatives for Hillsborough 20
- In office 2012–2018
- Succeeded by: Ralph Boehm

Personal details
- Party: Republican

Frank Byron is an American politician. He was a member of the New Hampshire House of Representatives and represented Hillsborough 20th district.

Byron started serving in local government in his hometown of Litchfield in 1996.
