= St Margaret's Church, Owthorpe =

Church in Nottinghamshire, England

St Margaret’s Church, Owthorpe
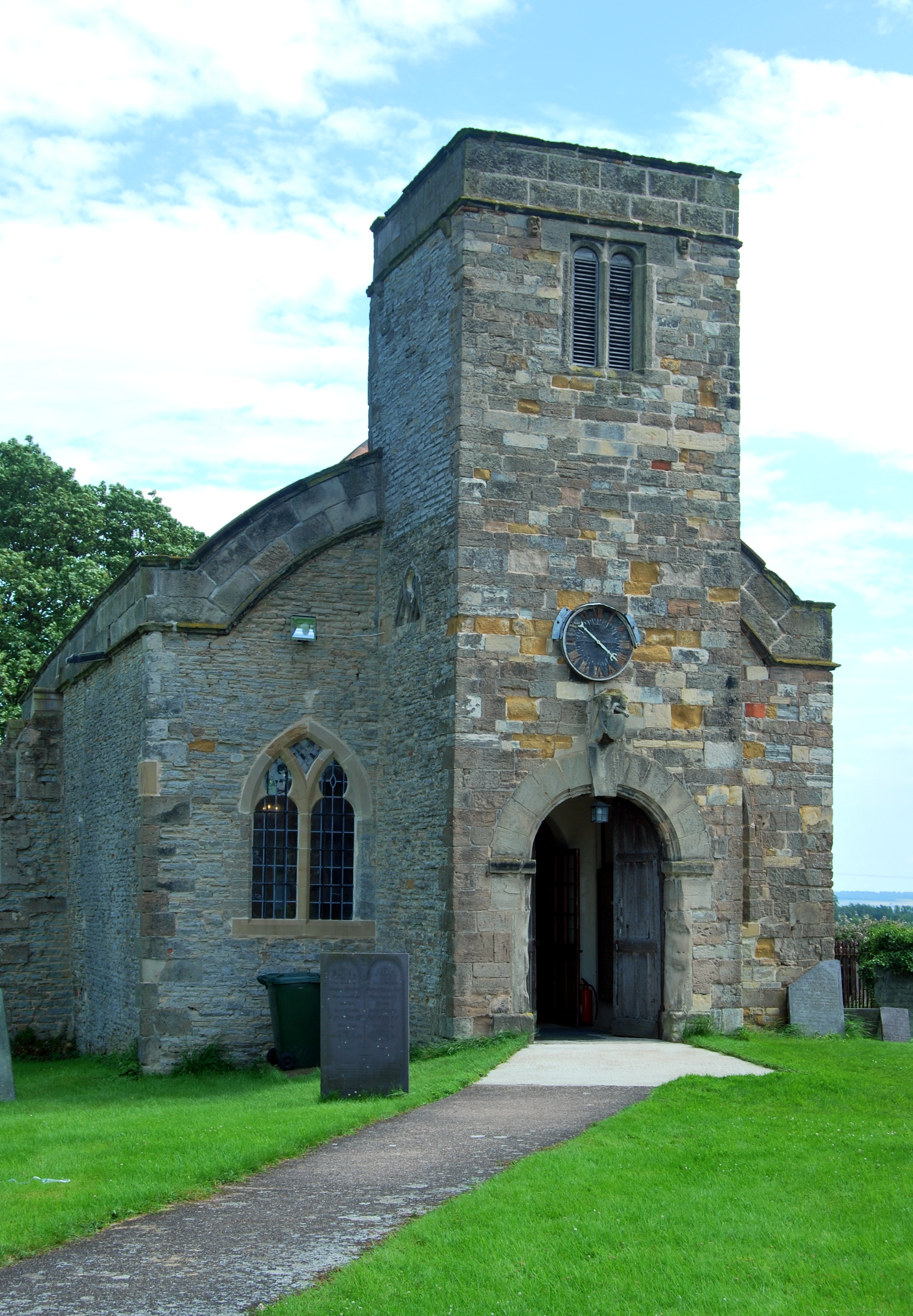
- St Margaret’s Church, Owthorpe
- St Margaret’s Church, Owthorpe
- 52°53′39.25″N 1°00′7.49″W
- OS grid reference: SK 67234 33439
- Location: Owthorpe
- Country: England
- Denomination: Church of England

History
- Dedication: St Margaret of Antioch

Architecture
- Heritage designation: Grade II* listed

Administration
- Province: York
- Diocese: Diocese of Southwell and Nottingham
- Archdeaconry: Archdeaconry of Nottingham
- Deanery: East Bingham
- Parish: Owthorpe

St Margaret's Church, Owthorpe is a Grade II* listed parish church in the Church of England in Owthorpe, Nottinghamshire, England.

Owthorpe has an unusual Grade II* listed Anglican church, dedicated to St Margaret of Antioch, once considered a patron saint of pregnancy. It stands away from the village in farmland, surrounded by a low wall, next to the site where the manor stood. Access is only along a public footpath – a narrow grass track, often muddy in the winter months – and through a timber gate.

Some features of St Margaret's date from the 12th century, although the structure underwent many changes over the centuries. It was rebuilt about 1650. The north wall is a surviving part of the original, larger church. Inside it has an oak-panelled, three-decker pulpit-cum-lectern with a Jacobean canopy, which is still in use.

In 1680 the church installed a clock built by Richard Roe of Epperstone.

The octagonal castellated font is thought to be from the 15th century. A wooden screen dividing the nave from the chancel is said to have come from Owthorpe Hall.

The church was restored in 1888 and again in 1905 by Arthur Brewill and Basil Baily when the plaster ceiling was removed to expose the roof timbers, and the masonry of the windows was restored and the windows reglazed.

== Memorials ==
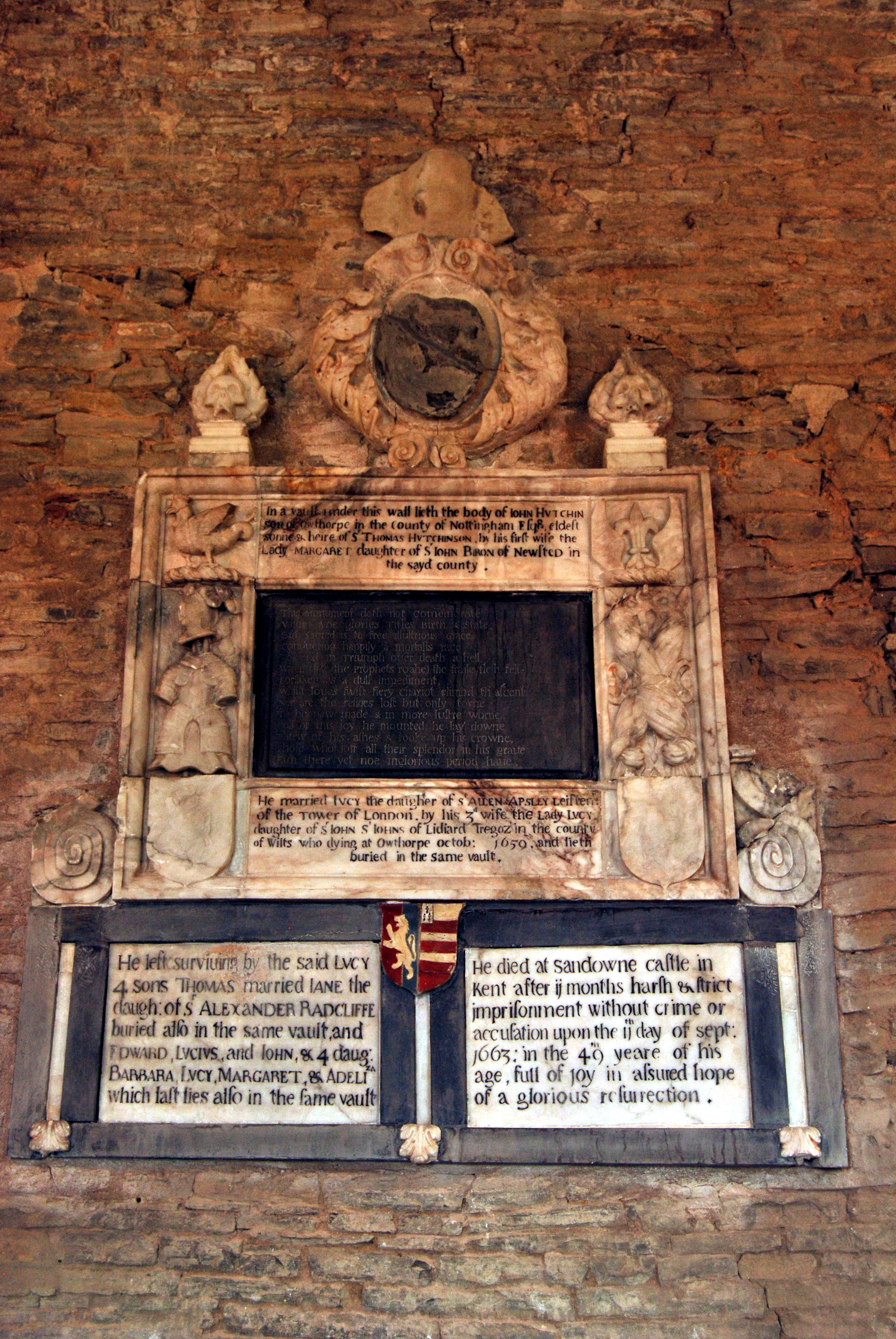
Memorial to John Hutchinson

- Colonel John Hutchinson (d. 11 September 1664)

== See also ==
- Grade II* listed buildings in Nottinghamshire
- Listed buildings in Owthorpe
