= William Byron, 3rd Baron Byron =

English nobleman, peer, politician and poet

William Byron, Lord Byron

Member of the House of Lords Lord Temporal
- In office 4 October 1679 – 13 November 1695; Hereditary peerage
- Preceded by: Richard Byron, 2nd Baron Byron
- Succeeded by: William Byron, 4th Baron Byron

Personal details
- Born: 1636
- Died: 13 November 1695 (aged 59)
- Spouse: Hon. Elizabeth Chaworth
- Children: William Byron, 4th Baron Byron; Hon. William Byron; Hon. Richard Byron; Hon. John Byron; Hon. Ernestus Byron
- Parents: Richard Byron, 2nd Baron Byron (father); Elizabeth Rossell (mother)

William Byron, 3rd Baron Byron (1636 – 13 November 1695) was an English nobleman, peer, politician, and a poet.

== Life ==
Byron was the son of Richard Byron, 2nd Baron Byron and Elizabeth Rossell. He succeeded to the title of 3rd Baron Byron in 1679 upon the death of his father.

Lord Byron died on 13 November 1695, and was succeeded by his fifth (but only surviving) son William Byron, 4th Baron Byron (born 1669/70).

== Family ==
Lord Byron married the Hon. Elizabeth Chaworth, daughter of John Chaworth, 2nd Viscount Chaworth of Armagh and Hon. Elizabeth Noel, in 1660. They had five sons, but the first four died in infancy:

- Hon. William Byron (born before 1670)
- Hon. Richard Byron (born before 1670)
- Hon. John Byron (born before 1670)
- Hon. Ernestus Byron (born before 1670)
- William Byron, 4th Baron Byron (1669/70–1736)

Lord Byron married Elizabeth Stonhouse, daughter of Sir George Stonhouse, 3rd Bt. and Margaret Lovelace, on 25 June 1685.

A daughter (from which of the two marriages is unclear), Hon. Catherine Byron, died in 1746. She married Arthur Cole, 1st Baron Ranelagh; they had no children.

Peerage of England
Preceded by Richard Byron	Baron Byron; 1679–1695	Succeeded by William Byron
