= Bill Byron =

Rugby union player from Northern Ireland

- Full name: William Grant Byron
- Born: 6 March 1876 Derry, Ireland
- Died: 24 December 1961 (aged 85) Belfast, Northern Ireland
- University: University of Edinburgh
- Occupation: Accountant

Rugby union career
- Position: Forward
International career
Years	Team	Apps	(Points)
1896–99	Ireland	11	(0)

William Grant Byron (6 March 1876 — 24 December 1961) was an Irish international rugby union player.

Born in Derry, Byron played varsity rugby during his studies at the University of Edinburgh and was with Belfast club North of Ireland when he gained his first Ireland call up for the 1896 Home Nations, having impressed in provincial matches with Ulster. He gained a total of 11 international caps, finishing his career as a triple crown winner in 1899.

Byron, an accountant, served as an officer in both the Second Boer War and World War I, the latter with the rank of captain. Injured by shellfire in World War I, Byron was left blinded until undergoing a successful procedure by renowned ophthalmic surgeon Richard Cruise in London.

== See also ==
- List of Ireland national rugby union players
