= Rupert Byron, 11th Baron Byron =

British nobleman, peer and politician

The Right Honourable The Lord Byron

Member of the House of Lords Lord Temporal
- In office 6 June 1949 – 1 November 1983; Hereditary peerage
- Preceded by: The 10th Baron Byron
- Succeeded by: The 12th Baron Byron

Personal details
- Born: 13 August 1903
- Died: 1 November 1983 (age 80)
- Spouse: Pauline Augusta Cornwall
- Children: Hon. Isobel Ann Byron
- Parent(s): Col. Wilfrid Byron; Sylvia Mary Moore

Rupert Frederick George Byron, 11th Baron Byron (13 August 1903 – 1 November 1983) was a British nobleman, peer, politician, and the eleventh Baron Byron, as a descendant of a cousin of Romantic poet and writer, George Gordon Byron, 6th Baron Byron.

== Life ==
Byron was the elder son of Col. Wilfrid Byron, of Perth, Western Australia, and of Sylvia Mary Byron née Moore, of Winchester, England, the only daughter of the Reverend C. T. Moore. He was educated at Gresham's School, Holt.

A farmer and grazier in Australia from 1921, he served in the Second World War as a Lieutenant of the RANVR, from 1941 to 1946, and succeeded his first cousin once removed, the Rev. Frederick Ernest Charles Byron, 10th Baron Byron, to the peerage in 1949. He belonged to naval and military clubs in Perth, Western Australia.

Byron died on 1 November 1983 in Mount Claremont, Western Australia, and was succeeded by his fifth cousin, Lt. Col. Richard Geoffrey Gordon Byron, 12th Baron Byron DSO (born 1899).

== Family ==
He married Pauline Augusta Cornwall (d.1993), daughter of T. J. Cornwall of Wagin, Western Australia, in 1931, and they had one daughter, the Hon. Isobel Ann Byron (1932).

== Arms ==
Coat of arms of Rupert Byron, 11th Baron Byron
Coronet A Coronet of a Baron Crest A Mermaid proper Escutcheon Argent three Bendlets enhanced Gules Supporters On either side a Horse of a brown bay colour unguled Or Motto Crede Byron (Trust Byron)

Peerage of England
Preceded by Frederick Byron	Baron Byron; 1949–1983	Succeeded by Richard Byron
