= Norm Byron =

Australian rules footballer

Personal information
- Full name: James Norman Lyons Byron
- Born: 4 November 1897; Carlton, Victoria
- Died: 27 February 1959 (aged 61); Fitzroy North, Victoria
- Height: 175 cm (5 ft 9 in)

Playing career^{1}
Years	Club	Games (Goals)
1918	Fitzroy	2 (1)
- ^{1} Playing statistics correct to the end of 1918.

James Norman Lyons Byron (4 November 1897 – 27 February 1959) was an Australian rules footballer who played with Fitzroy in the Victorian Football League (VFL).

Byron was also an entertainer and composer. He composed the Premiership Song for Fitzroy's 1944 Premiership win. His sister Molly Byron was also an entertainer.
