= Ron Byron =

Australian rules footballer

Personal information
- Full name: Ron Byron
- Born: 9 August 1931
- Died: 26 October 2009 (aged 78)
- Original team: Dandenong
- Height: 184 cm (6 ft 0 in)
- Weight: 82 kg (181 lb)

Playing career^{1}
Years	Club	Games (Goals)
1955	St Kilda	2 (0)
- ^{1} Playing statistics correct to the end of 1955.

Ron Byron (9 August 1931 – 26 October 2009) was an Australian rules footballer who played with St Kilda in the Victorian Football League (VFL).
