= John Byron (died 1567) =

English landowner (1488–1567)

Sir John Byron
- Born: 1488; Clayton, Lancashire
- Died: 1567 (aged 79); Rochdale, Cheshire
- Noble family: Byron
- Spouses: Isabel Lenington, Elizabeth Costerdine
- Issue: John Byron; Isabella Byron
- Father: Nicholas Byron
- Mother: Joan Bushler

Sir John Byron (1488–1567) was an English nobleman, politician, and knight of the Tudor era. He was Member of Parliament for Nottinghamshire in 1529.

== Life and family ==
Byron was the son and heir of Nicholas Byron, who was knighted by Prince Arthur in 1502, and his wife, Joan Bushler.

Sir John lived at Colwick in Nottinghamshire, before being granted Newstead Abbey in the same county by Henry VIII of England on 26 May 1540. He was appointed Lieutenant of Sherwood Forest. He was also Steward of Manchester and Rochdale. He was a trusted adviser to Henry VIII, and was at court most of his life. He started work on Newstead, making it into a home for his family.

He was appointed Sheriff of Nottinghamshire and Derbyshire for 1523–24, 1527–28, 1542–43 and 1551–52. He was Custos Rotulorum of Nottinghamshire by 1562.

== Marriage and issue ==
Byron married twice: firstly Isabel Lenington, by whom he had no issue and secondly Elizabeth Costerdine, the daughter of William Costerdine of Lancashire, and also the widow of George Halgh of Halgh, Lancashire, with whom he had one daughter and three sons, including John Byron, who was knighted by Queen Elizabeth I of England and his great-grandson became the first Baron Byron.

== Sources ==
- "Nottinghamshire History-History of Colwick".
