= Elsa Spear Byron =

American photographer

- Born: 1896; Big Horn, Wyoming
- Died: 1992 (aged 95–96)

Elsa Spear Byron (1896 in Big Horn, Wyoming – 1992) was an American photographer.

As a young child, she learned to help her mother make photographic prints from a plate camera purchased in 1900. Her photographs were sold all over the country and greatly enlarged prints were used by the railroads to advertise train trips to Wyoming. She lived in Sheridan, Wyoming, in the same house for nearly 70 years until her death in 1992.

== Biography ==
Byron was a first-generation Wyomingite, born in 1896, her ancestors all New Englanders and Mayflower descendants. Her mother's parents left Boston in 1849 and headed west to Illinois, Kansas and Nebraska, arriving in Laramie, Wyoming, in 1881. Elsa's maternal grandfather, Rev. George Washington Benton, was the first Protestant minister in northern Wyoming.

Her father, Willis Spear, arrived in Wyoming with his family in 1874 from Connecticut and eventually settled next to Elsa's grandfather. Willis married his neighbor Virginia Bell Benton, and they settled on 260 acres (1 km^{2}) near Sheridan in northern Wyoming. Elsa and her two brothers and sister grew up on a ranch that eventually expanded to include millions of acres of land, most of it leased from the government. When Elsa was two, her father and his family formed the Spear Brothers Cattle Company, which leased over a million acres (4,000 km^{2}) of Crow Indian Reservation land in Montana along with a number of ranches along the Powder River and Clearmont. "They ran 57,000 head of cattle although the company only owned 36,000 head," she said. The rest were leased.

Elsa and her siblings grew up in the saddle. The Spear sisters rode sidesaddle and went along on cattle roundups. When the severe drought of the early 1920s nearly destroyed the northern Wyoming cattle business, her father built a "dude camp", she said. The Spear-O-Wigwam is still operating in the Big Horn National Forest.

The Spear family made regular trips to Washington, D.C. so that Willis Spear could renew his land leases. They would stay in the capitol for six months, where they attended matinees after school and met famous actors, including John Drew and his niece, Mary Bordon. Elsa returned to Washington following her graduation from high school in 1914, where she attended the National School for Domestic Arts and Sciences, accompanied by her mother. There she studied the theory and practice of cooking "and all kinds of fancy work in sewing and millinery." But her main interest was photography.

Two years later she married Harold Edwards of Colorado, an office manager for the Sheridan County Electric Company. They built a house in Sheridan and Elsa took pictures of her children as they were growing up. She had been interested in photography since her mother bought a plate camera in 1900. Elsa remembered helping her mother develop the photographs in wooden frames which were placed in the sun.

The pack trips to her father's Spear-O-Wigwam provided the petite photographer with endless picture taking opportunities. She made sixteen annual pack trips of two weeks' duration while her daughters were growing up, "and that's how I got my pictures from all over the mountains," she said. During one of the pack trips, "some dudes" named one of the Big Horn Mountain lakes for her, which is still recorded on Wyoming maps.

When she returned home, she enlarged her pictures in her kitchen where she had cut a trapdoor in the ceiling to raise the head of the enlarger high enough to make huge prints by projecting them on the floor. Some of her photos include the Cheyenne Indian survivors of the Custer Battlefield, whom she photographed in 1926 on the battle's 50th anniversary. Among the Indians who posed for her at the battle site were Red Cloud, grandson of the famous warrior, and Plenty Coups, a Crow chief. She also photographed many Crow Fairs from 1911 to the 1950s. One of her pictures was enlarged to eight feet in length in Denver and used as background for an Indian camp display in the Cheyenne museum.

Before the advent of color photographs, Byron tinted black and white pictures with oils and sold many of them to a number of outlets, including the Northern Pacific and Burlington Railroads. "My biggest thrill", she said, "was walking up the street in Chicago and seeing four of my big pictures framed in the window of the Northern Pacific office on Jackson Boulevard during the 1930s. "They did a lot of advertising and used a lot of my 20 x 30 inch pictures to try to get the dudes to come out here."

== Recognition ==
The Big Horn Mountains' Lake Elsa got its name from Elsa Spear Byron.
