= Catherine Byron =

Irish poet who often collaborates with visual and sound artists

- Born: 22 August 1947 (age 78); London
- Education: Somerville College, Oxford

Catherine Byron (born 22 August 1947) is an Irish poet who often collaborates with visual and sound artists.

== Biography ==
Catherine Greenfield was born in London to a mother from Galway and was raised in Belfast. She has lived in Oxford, Scotland, Derry and County Donegal. She became Catherine Byron when she married at about twenty and had daughters. Educated in Somerville College, Oxford, Byron studied Classics and wrote poetry for most of her life until she married. She stopped writing then for about ten years. Since resuming poetry Byron has published six collections. As well as writing her own poetry, Byron has studied Seamus Heaney and wrote the work Out of Step: Pursuing Seamus Heaney to Purgatory.

Byron frequently works both with artist and calligrapher Denis Brown, and painter and printmaker Eileen Coxon. She has been artist in residence at the Hayward Gallery and the department of Glass & Ceramics at the University of Sunderland. She has taught writing and Medieval Literature at Nottingham Trent University.

== Bibliography ==
- The Getting of Vellum (Salmon 2001)
- The Fat-Hen Field Hospital (Bristol 1993)
- Settlements and Samhain (Bristol 1993)
- Out of Step: Pursuing Seamus Heaney to Purgatory (prose) (Bristol 1992)
