= Bourmond Byron =

Haitian painter

Bourmond Byron (June 23, 1920 – 2004) was a Haitian painter. Hailing from Jacmel, Byron mainly paints landscapes and scenes from Haitian life.
