= Gilbert Byron =

American poet

Gilbert Valliant Byron (July 12, 1903 – June 25, 1991) was an American writer, best known for his poems, short stories, novels, historical research, magazine and newspaper columns and articles detailing life on the Chesapeake Bay throughout the 20th century.

Byron was born in Chestertown, Maryland on July 12, 1903, the same day as Henry David Thoreau's birthday, leading to him being referred to as "The Chesapeake Thoreau." In 1923, Byron graduated Washington College with a degree in History and Political Science. After graduating, he became a teacher of Lewes High School in Lewes, Delaware, where he managed to rise to the position of principal until he was forced to step down from his position in 1947, when his socialist leanings were discovered by the local school board. After his demotion, Byron moved from Lewes, eventually settled in Saint Michaels, Maryland, where he occupied a log cabin, in which he lived his days in "a solitary but literarily productive existence." Gilbert Byron died shortly before his 88th birthday on June 25, 1991.

During his lifetime, Byron had published 14 books and over 70 short stories, poems, and articles. His books and poems, including The Lord's Oysters, Done Crabbin', and These Chesapeake Men, make up what is likely the largest collection of written works on the Chesapeake Bay area authored by one person. Byron lived on the Eastern Shore of the Bay nearly all of his life, and the log cabin where he resided for 45 years of his life was saved from destruction. The cabin was moved to Pickering Creek Audubon Center in Easton, Maryland in the early 1990s . The Gilbert Bryon Society was founded in 1991 to cultivate an awareness and appreciation of the Chesapeake Bay region's literature in particular, and the environment in general, through the works and legacy of Gilbert Bryon.

Byron's biography, "Gilbert Byron - A Life Worth Examining," was published in 2015 by the Talbot County Free Library, Easton, Maryland.
