= Jim Byron (publicist) =

American publicist

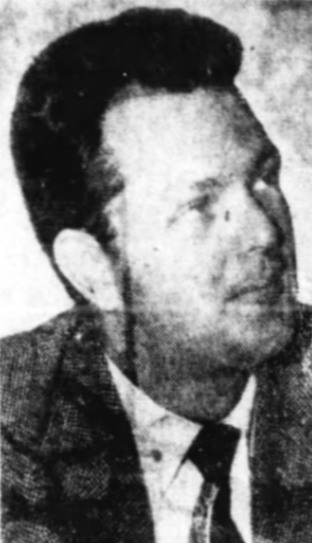
- Byron in 1954
- Born: James Byron
- Occupation: Publicist

Jim Byron was an American publicist known for working with female models and actresses during the 1950s and 1960s, including Jayne Mansfield and Yvette Mimieux. Prior to working with actresses, Jim Byron worked as a promoter for the West Hollywood club Ciro's.

== Work with Jayne Mansfield ==
Byron was hired as Jayne Mansfield's publicist at her request on Christmas Eve 1954. She was an unknown in Hollywood at the time and he considered her a diamond in the rough—one who needed a little polish and promotion in order to become a sensation. To bring the newspapers on her side, he had her visit newspaper offices over Christmas in order to cheer up the writers there who had to work over the holiday period. The plan worked, and images of Mansfield began to appear in print. In response, Byron's contract was extended to five years and planned her big break, which took place at a press event for Jane Russell's 1955 film Underwater!

During the event in Florida at a pool, the press were milling around and Mansfield jumped into the pool as she removed her bikini top. The press took immediate note, and Byron took the credit for the move. Although not her agent, he was responsible for her signing a seven-year deal with Warner Brothers Studios.

== Work with Yvette Mimieux ==
Byron personally discovered Yvette Mimieux when the actress was 16 years old. She was riding a horse down a bridle path in the Hollywood Hills when Byron came across her and gave her his business card and an offer to get her into films. He began to publicize his new client by having her enter local beauty competitions, where she was successful winning several Los Angeles area titles. This generated interest from MGM in 1959, who signed her to a seven-year contract.

== Personal life ==
Byron was not universally liked in Hollywood; Frank Sinatra referred to him as a "fucking parasite", and the pair came to blows in 1954 on the Sunset Strip in West Hollywood. It was as a result of Byron asking Sinatra's guest, Bob Neal, who his date was. Both Sinatra and Byron landed blows before the fight was broken up. Subsequently, Byron declined to press charges.
