= Robert Byron, 13th Baron Byron =

British politician and barrister (born 1950)

The Right Honourable The Lord Byron

Member of the House of Lords Lord Temporal
- In office 15 June 1989 – 11 November 1999; Hereditary peerage
- Preceded by: Richard Byron, 12th Baron Byron

Personal details
- Born: 5 April 1950 (age 76)
- Spouse: Robyn Margaret McLean
- Children: Hon. Caroline Anne Victoria Byron; Hon. Emily Clare Byron; Hon. Sophie Georgina Byron; Hon. Charles Richard Gordon Byron
- Parent(s): Richard Byron, 12th Baron Byron; Dorigen Margaret Esdaile

Robert James Byron, 13th Baron Byron (born 5 April 1950), is a British peer and barrister.

== Early life and education ==
Byron is the son of Lt. Col. Richard Geoffrey Gordon Byron, 12th Baron Byron, and Dorigen Margaret Esdaile. He was educated at Wellington College in Berkshire and studied law at Trinity College, Cambridge.

He married Robyn Margaret McLean in 1979. She became Lady Byron when her husband inherited the barony on 15 June 1989. The couple have four children:

- The Hon. Caroline Anne Victoria Byron (1981)
- The Hon. Emily Clare Byron (1984)
- The Hon. Sophie Georgina Byron (1986)
- The Hon. Charles Richard Gordon Byron (28 July 1990); heir apparent.

He is a collateral descendant of Lord Byron, through a cousin of Byron.

== Professional life ==
Byron was admitted to the Inner Temple and was called to the bar in 1974. He became a partner at Holman, Fenwick & Willan.

== House of Lords ==
Upon inheriting his peerage, Byron became entitled to sit in the House of Lords, where he took the Oath of Allegiance in October 1989. He attended chamber debates infrequently, speaking mostly on bills related to the justice system and shipping law. Along with most hereditary peers, he lost the right to attend when the House of Lords Act 1999 took effect in November 1999.

== Arms ==
Coat of arms of Robert Byron, 13th Baron Byron
Coronet A Coronet of a Baron Crest A Mermaid proper Escutcheon Argent three Bendlets enhanced Gules Supporters On either side a Horse of a brown bay colour unguled Or Motto Crede Byron (Trust Byron)

== Personal life ==
Byron is resident in the New Forest, Hampshire. In 2021 he published a novel, Echoes of a Life.

Peerage of England
Preceded by Richard Byron	Baron Byron; 1989–present	Incumbent
