= Michael Byron (footballer) =

English footballer

Personal information
- Full name: Michael John Byron
- Date of birth: 16 August 1987 (age 39)
- Place of birth: Liverpool, England
- Height: 6 ft 2 in (1.88 m)
- Position: Defender

Team information
- Current team: Atletico Marina

Youth career
- ?–2006: Hull City

Senior career*
Years	Team	Apps	(Gls)
2006–2007	Hull City	0	(0)
2006	→ Hinckley United (loan)	13	(0)
2007	→ Notts County (loan)	3	(0)
2007–2008	Notts County	0	(0)
2007–2008	→ Hinckley United (loan)	5	(0)
2008	Hinckley United		
2008–2011	Droylsden	41	(1)
2011	Northwich Victoria		
2011–	Bala Town	4	(0)
2013–	Droylsden	0	(0)

International career^{‡}
2009	England C	1	(0)
- * Club domestic league appearances and goals as of 07:44, 4 September 2011 (UTC) ‡ National team caps and goals as of 23:23, 26 August 2011 (UTC)

Michael John Byron (born 16 August 1987) is an English footballer who plays as a defender.

== Club career ==
Byron came through the Academy at Hull City and earned himself a one-year contract in 2006. He spent much of that first year on loan to first Conference North Hinckley United and then League Two Notts County. He did not make any senior appearances for Hull, and was released at the end of the season.

He suffered an injury whilst on loan at Notts County, but signed for them once he was fit again in September 2007.

To re-gain his match fitness, he signed a three-month loan deal back at Hinckley United in November 2007. In January 2008 he signed an 18-month contract with Hinckley United after being released by Notts County, but left the club in June 2008.

He then joined Droylsden where he stayed for three years, before a brief period at Northwich Victoria where he made less than twenty starts. This was followed by a move to Welsh club Bala Town in June 2011.

In January 2013 he was released by Bala and promptly snapped back up by Droylsden.

== International career ==
Byron played for England C in a 4–0 victory over the Malta under-21 team in February 2009.
