= Richard Byron, 12th Baron Byron =

British peer, politician and soldier (1899–1989)

Lieutenant Colonel The Right Honourable The Lord Byron DSO

Member of the House of Lords Lord Temporal
- In office 1 November 1983 – 15 June 1989; Hereditary peerage
- Preceded by: The 11th Baron Byron
- Succeeded by: The 13th Baron Byron

Personal details
- Born: 3 November 1899
- Died: 15 June 1989 (aged 89)
- Spouse(s): Margaret Mary Steuart, Dorigen Margaret Esdaile
- Children: Hon. Richard Noel Byron; Robert Byron, 13th Baron Byron
- Parent(s): Col. Richard Byron; Mabel Mackenzie Winter
- Military career
- Allegiance: United Kingdom
- Branch: British Army
- Service years: 1918–1947
- Rank: Lieutenant Colonel
- Service number: 27613
- Units: 4th Royal Irish Dragoon Guards; 4th/7th Royal Dragoon Guards
- Conflicts: First World War; Second World War: Western Front (World War II); Operation Overlord
- Awards: Distinguished Service Order

Lieutenant-Colonel Richard Geoffrey Gordon Byron, 12th Baron Byron DSO (3 November 1899 – 15 June 1989) was a British nobleman, peer, politician, and army officer. He was a descendant of a cousin of Romantic poet and writer, George Gordon Byron, 6th Baron Byron.

== Early life and education ==
Byron was the son of Col. Richard Byron and Mabel Mackenzie Winter. He was educated at Eton College in Eton, UK.

== Professional life ==
After passing out from the Royal Military College, Byron was commissioned into the 4th Royal Irish Dragoon Guards as a second lieutenant on 21 August 1918, barely three months before the end of the First World War. He was promoted to lieutenant on 21 February 1920. Byron was Aide-de-Camp to the Governor of Bombay, Sir George Lloyd, from 1921 to September 1923. On 1 March 1929, Byron was seconded to the Duke of Lancaster's Own Yeomanry, a Territorial Army regiment, as its adjutant with the temporary rank of captain. He was promoted to the substantive rank of captain in the Regular Army on 25 March 1933, and vacated his appointment as adjutant in the yeomanry on 14 November.

Byron served as Military Secretary to the Governor-General of New Zealand, the Viscount Galway, from December 1937 to October 1939. He fought in the Second World War, during which he was Lieutenant-Colonel of the 4th/7th Royal Dragoon Guards in 1941. As a temporary lieutenant-colonel, Byron was awarded the Distinguished Service Order (DSO) in August 1944, for heroism during Operation Overlord. He was promoted to the substantive rank of lieutenant-colonel on 1 August 1945, and retired from active service on 27 August 1947.

== Family life ==
Byron married Margaret Mary Steuart in 1926, but they were divorced in 1946, and later that same year, he married Dorigen Margaret Esdaile, and had two sons by her:

- The Hon. Richard Noel Byron (1948–1985)
- Robert James Byron, 13th Baron Byron (1950)

Byron succeeded to the title of 12th Baron Byron in 1983 upon the death of his fifth cousin Rupert Frederick George Byron, 11th Baron Byron, in Australia. Lord Byron died on 15 June 1989 at age 89, whereupon his surviving son Robert Byron became the 13th Baron.

== Arms ==
Coat of arms of Richard Byron, 12th Baron Byron
Coronet A Coronet of a Baron Crest A Mermaid proper Escutcheon Argent three Bendlets enhanced Gules Supporters On either side a Horse of a brown bay colour unguled Or Motto Crede Byron (Trust Byron)

Peerage of England
Preceded by Rupert Byron	Baron Byron; 1983–1989	Succeeded by Robert Byron
