= Richard Byron, 2nd Baron Byron =

English nobleman, Royalist, politician, peer and knight

Richard Byron, Lord Byron

Member of the House of Lords Lord Temporal
- In office 23 August 1652 – 4 October 1679; Hereditary peerage
- Preceded by: John Byron, 1st Baron Byron
- Succeeded by: William Byron, 3rd Baron Byron

Personal details
- Born: 1606 Newstead, Nottinghamshire
- Died: 4 October 1679 (aged 73) Rochdale, Lancashire
- Spouse(s): Elizabeth Rossell, Elizabeth Booth
- Children: William Byron, 3rd Baron Byron; Catherine Byron

Richard Byron, 2nd Baron Byron (1606 – 4 October 1679) was an English nobleman, Royalist, politician, peer, knight, and supporter of Charles I during the English Civil War.

== Life ==
Byron was the son of John Byron (died 1623) and Anne Molyneux, and grandson of parliamentarian Sir John Byron (died 1600).

He fought in the Battle of Edgehill as a "Valiant Colonel", and was knighted in 1642. He also graduated from Oxford University, in 1642 with a Master of Arts (MA). He held the office of Governor of Newark, Nottinghamshire. He held the office of Governor of Appleby Castle, Westmorland. He succeeded to the title of 2nd Baron Byron in 1652 upon the death of his brother John Byron, 1st Baron Byron.

Lord Byron died in 1679 and was succeeded by his son William Byron, 3rd Baron Byron (born 1636).

== Family ==
Lord Byron married Elizabeth Rossell, daughter of Gervase Rossell and Margaret Whalley. They had six children, including William Byron, 3rd Baron Byron (1636–1695) and Hon. Catherine Byron, who married Sir William Stanhope.

He married Elizabeth Booth, daughter of Sir George Booth, 1st Baronet and Katharine Anderson, after 1651. No children resulted.

One of Lord Byron's younger brothers was the Royalist soldier Sir Robert Byron.

Peerage of England
Preceded by John Byron	Baron Byron; 1652–1679	Succeeded by William Byron
