= Robert Byron (cricketer) =

South African cricketer (1910–1952)

Personal information
- Full name: Charles Robert Hamilton Byron
- Born: 10 April 1910; King William's Town, Cape Colony
- Died: 6 March 1952 (aged 41); King William's Town, Cape Province, South Africa
- Batting: Right-handed

Domestic team information
- Years: Team
- 1928–29 to 1936–37: Border

Career statistics
Competition	First-class
Matches	15
Runs scored	515
Batting average	17.75
100s/50s	1/1
Top score	135
Balls bowled	162
Wickets	0
Bowling average	–
5 wickets in innings	–
10 wickets in match	–
Best bowling	–
Catches/stumpings	5/–
- Source: Cricinfo, 20 December 2018

Charles Robert Hamilton Byron (10 April 1910 – 6 March 1952) was a South African cricketer who played first-class cricket for Border from 1928 to 1937.

An opening batsman, Robert Byron came to prominence when he scored 101 for a South African schoolboys team against the touring MCC team early in 1928. It was one of only three centuries scored against the MCC, compared to the 14 scored by MCC batsmen.

He played his first first-class match for Border later in 1928 and appeared frequently over nine years, but his success in his first-class career was modest except for his only century, 135 against Transvaal at Johannesburg in 1935–36.

Byron lived in King William's Town, where he worked as a bank clerk. He died in hospital in King William's Town in March 1952 aged 41, leaving a widow and two young sons.
