= John Byron (died 1450) =

English politician

Sir John Byron
- Born: 1386; Clayton, Lancashire
- Died: 1450 (aged 64); Clayton, Lancashire
- Spouse: Margery Booth
- Issue: Nicholas Byron; Ralph Byron; Richard Byron; Elizabeth Byron; Margaret Byron; Mary Byron; Jane Byron; Helena Byron; Catherine Byron
- Father: Richard Byron
- Mother: Joan de Colwick

Sir John Byron (1386–1450) was an English nobleman, landowner, politician, and knight. He had estates in Clayton near Manchester and at South Stoke (now Stoke Rochford) in Lincolnshire. He was Member of Parliament for Lancashire in 1421 and 1429, and for Lincolnshire in 1447.

== Family ==
Byron was the son and heir of Richard Byron (1354–1415), the son and heir of James Byron of Clayton (c. 1300–1355) by his wife Elizabeth de Bernake. Sir John's mother was Joan de Colwick, daughter and heiress of William de Colwick of Colwick Hall. He was also an early ancestor of Ada Lovelace.

== Marriage and issue ==
Byron married Margery Booth, daughter of John Booth, with whom he had six daughters and three sons, including Nicholas Byron, who was knighted by Prince Arthur in 1502. Nicholas inherited his father's estates.
