= John Byron (died 1623) =

English knight

Sir John Byron
- Born: c. 1562; Newstead, Nottinghamshire
- Died: 1623 (aged 61); Newstead, Nottinghamshire
- Noble family: Byron
- Spouse: Margaret FitzWilliam
- Issue: 5 sons and 5 daughters
- Father: John Byron
- Mother: Alice Strelley

Sir John Byron (c. 1562–1623) of Colwick and Newstead, Nottinghamshire, and Clayton, Lancashire, was a Member of Parliament for Nottinghamshire in 1597.

Byron was the son of Sir John Byron (died 1600) and his wife Alice Strelley. He married Margaret FitzWilliam, daughter of Sir William FitzWilliam of Gaynes Park. They had 5 sons and 5 daughters. Among his sons was another Sir John Byron, whose own sons, John and Richard became Barons Byron.

He was knighted by King James in April 1603 at Worksop Manor.
