= Owthorpe =

Hamlet and civil parish in Nottinghamshire, England

Coordinates: 52.89388°N 1.00555°W

- Hamlet and civil parish
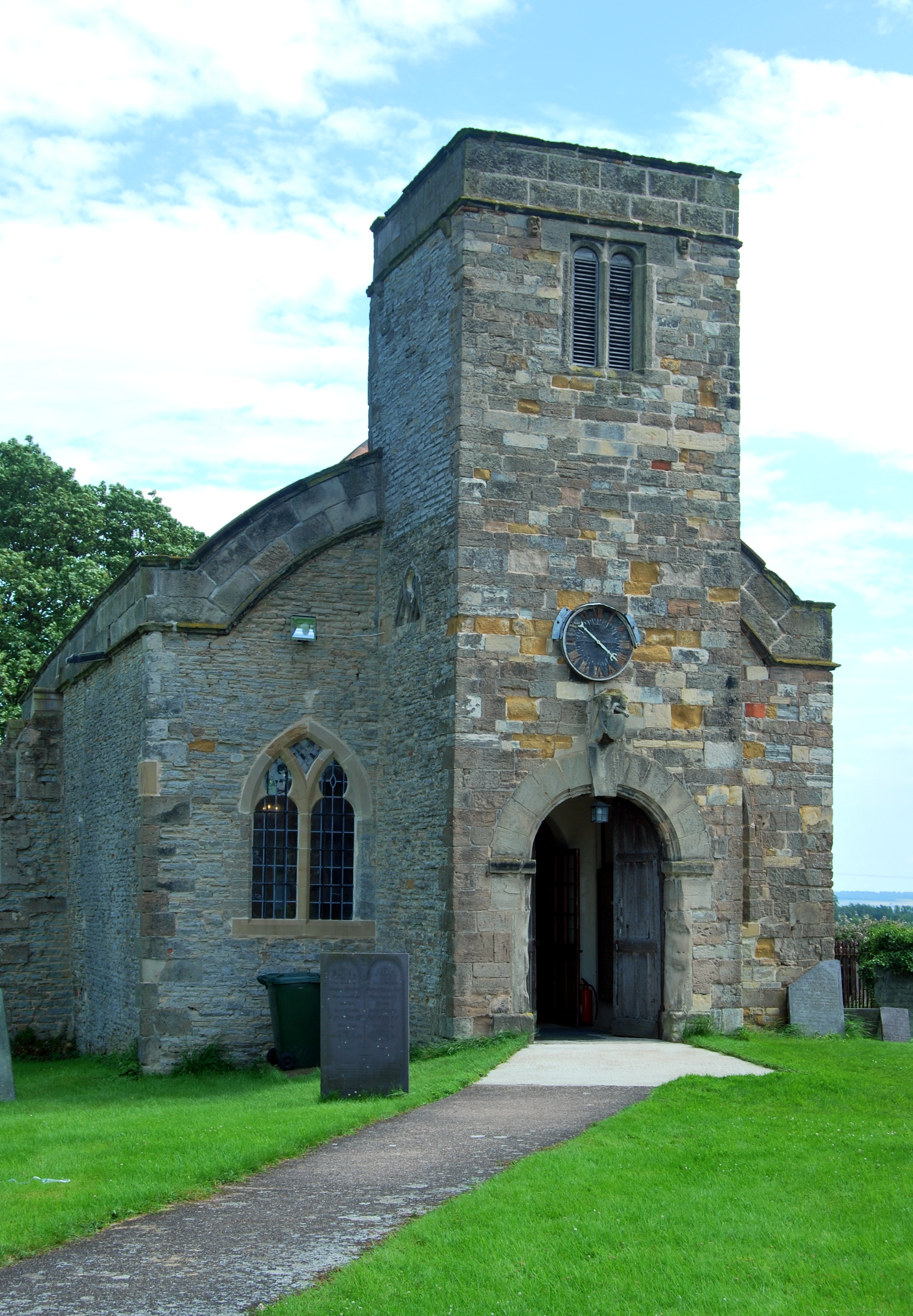
- St Margaret's Church, Owthorpe

- Location within Nottinghamshire
- Interactive map of Owthorpe
- Area: 2.58 sq mi (6.7 km^{2})
- Population: 102 (2021)
  - Density: 40/sq mi (15/km^{2})
- OS grid reference: SK 677330
  - London: 100 mi (160 km) SSE
- District: Rushcliffe
- Shire county: Nottinghamshire
- Region: East Midlands
- Country: England
- Sovereign state: United Kingdom
- Post town: NOTTINGHAM
- Postcode district: NG12
- Dialling code: 0115
- Police: Nottinghamshire
- Fire: Nottinghamshire
- Ambulance: East Midlands
- UK Parliament: Rushcliffe

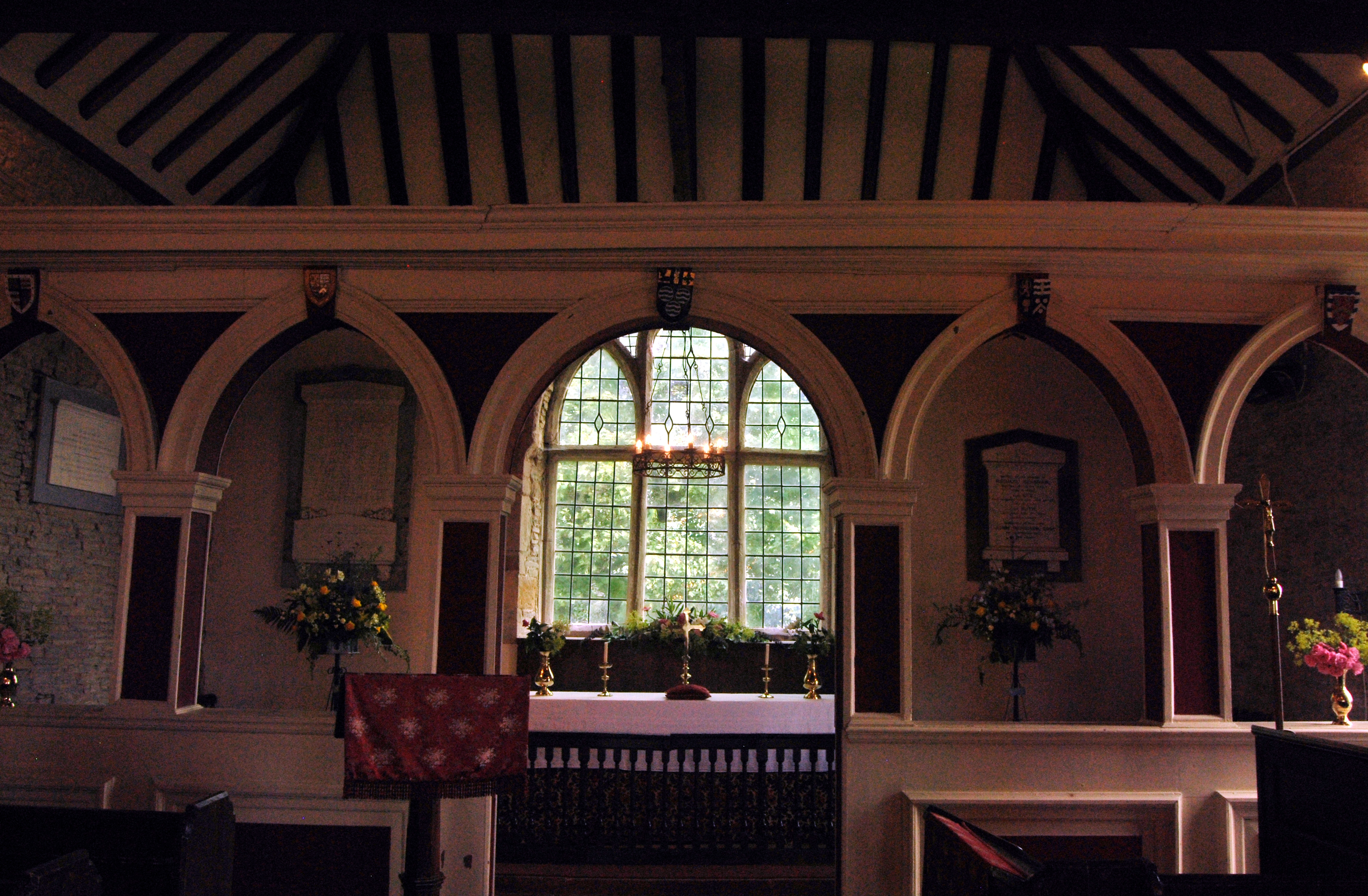
Interior of St Margaret's

Owthorpe is a hamlet and civil parish in the Borough of Rushcliffe in Nottinghamshire, England. The population of the hamlet was about 90 and was included in the civil parish of Cotgrave in the 2011 census, this increased to 102 at the 2021 census.

== Location and governance ==
Owthorpe is adjacent to the parishes of Cropwell Bishop, Stanton on the Wolds, Cotgrave, Kinoulton and Colston Bassett, two miles (3.2 km) south-east of Cotgrave and nine miles (14 km) south-east of Nottingham. It forms part of the borough of Rushcliffe. The Grantham Canal lies to its east, as does the Fosse Way, a Roman road whose line is largely followed by the A46 trunk road between Leicester and Lincoln. In 2006 the borough council recorded a population of 90 for Owthorpe, (and 102 residents in 2021) so that the parish is too small to have a parish council and has a parish meeting instead.

== Amenities ==
There are low-frequency weekday bus services to Cotgrave and Keyworth and term-time school buses to Bingham. The nearest railway station is at Radcliffe on Trent (4 miles (6.4 km). The nearest shops and medical and sports services are in Cotgrave. There is self-catering accommodation at Woodview Cottages, Newfields Farm. The Little Retreat, Colston Bassett Lane, provides spa treatments.

== Heritage ==
Owthorpe appears in the 1086 Domesday Book as Obetorp in the ancient hundred of Bingham. Its origin may be "Outlying farmstead or hamlet of a man called Úfi or Ufa", i. e. an Old Scandinavian or Old English personal name plus the widespread Danelaw element "thorpe" meaning hamlet. Lord and tenant-in-chief was Geoffrey Alselin.

A large manor house, Owthorpe Hall, was located here until it burned to the ground in a fire in the late 1820s. It was the seat of the Hutchinson family, one famous member of which was John Hutchinson, the Parliamentarian army officer and regicide. The family vault under the nave of the church is now sealed off, but when the floor gave way in 1859 it was found to contain 17 coffins.

The wife of John Hutchinson was Lucy Hutchinson, née Apsley (1620–1681), a biographer and poet, and the first person to translate the complete text of Lucretius's De rerum natura (On the Nature of Things) into English. She also wrote the epic poem Order and Disorder, which follows the Book of Genesis. Her biography of her husband was reprinted in 2010.

The lordship, then consisting of 1,300 acres (530 hectares) of enclosed land, was sold in 1773 to Sir George Bromley, Bt. It was occupied in 1797 as a tenant by a Mr Renshaw and described as "a square with handsome, lofty, and convenient apartments." Members of the Renshaw family remained there until 1825. The date of the subsequent fatal fire is uncertain, but the demolition was carried out by Sir Robert Howe Bromley, baronet, son of Sir George. This was recorded in 1832 as having occurred. None of the buildings survive, but there remain a series of fishponds off Swab's Lane, dug by Col. Hutchinson. These are being developed as a wildlife resource.

The population of Owthorpe was 107 in 1801, 138 in 1821, and 144 in 1831. The population was put at 143 in 1853, 131 in 1887 and 110 in 1911.) Historically Owthorpe parish was in the wapentake of Bingham, and from 1894 to 1974 in Bingham Rural District.

== Church ==
Owthorpe has an unusual Grade I listed Anglican church, dedicated to St Margaret of Antioch, once considered a patron saint of pregnancy. It stands away from the village in farmland, surrounded by a low wall, next to the site where the manor stood. Access is only along a public footpath – a narrow grass track, often muddy in the winter months – and through a timber gate. There are several 18th-century slate tombstones in the churchyard, three of which are examples of the "Belvoir angel" design found in many churchyards in the Vale of Belvoir.

The first written mention of a church at Owthorpe dates from 1299. However, some features of St Margaret's date from the 12th century. Thereafter the structure underwent many changes over the centuries. It was rebuilt about 1650, and has recently undergone further repairs. The north wall is a surviving part of the original, larger church. Inside it has an oak-panelled, three-decker pulpit-cum-lectern with a Jacobean canopy, which is still in use. The octagonal castellated font is thought to be from the 15th century. A wooden screen dividing the nave from the chancel is said to have come from Owthorpe Hall.

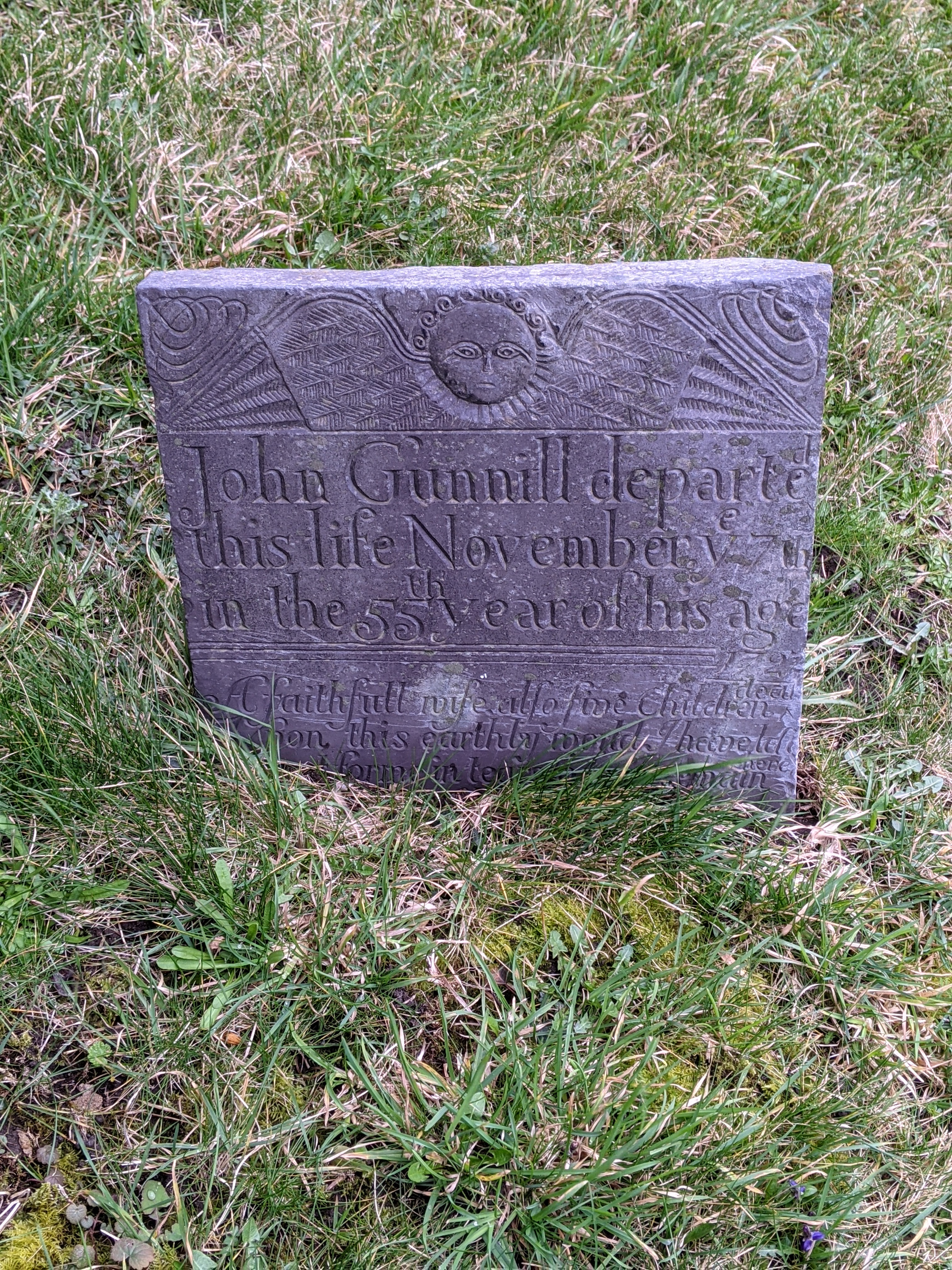
Belvoir angel gravestone in Owthorpe church graveyard – one of three

== Literary link ==
The children's historical novel Uncivil War: Twin Tales of Nottinghamshire by Noel Harrower features Owthorpe and the Hutchinsons.

== See also ==
- Listed buildings in Owthorpe

== External resources ==
- Pictures of the church and churchyard
- Owthorpe countryside photographs
- 19th-century line drawing and Owthorpe Hall description
- Aerial views of the village
- An 18th-century "Belvoir Angel" gravestone in Swithland slate
- An 1896 description
- An 1853 description
- More information and pictures relating to Lucy Hutchinson
- Map sources for Owthorpe
