= Baron Byron =

Barony in the Peerage of England

Barony of Byron
- Argent, three bendlets enhanced gules
- Creation date: 24 October 1643
- Created by: Charles I
- Peerage: Peerage of England
- First holder: Sir John Byron
- Present holder: Robert Byron, 13th Baron Byron
- Heir apparent: Charles Byron
- Remainder to: Heirs male of the first Baron Byron and his brothers, lawfully begotten
- Former seat: Newstead Abbey
- Motto: Crede Byron ("Trust Byron")

Baron Byron, of Rochdale in the County Palatine of Lancaster, is a title in the Peerage of England. It was created in 1643 by letters patent for Sir John Byron, a Cavalier general and former Member of Parliament. The peerage was created with remainder to the heirs male of his body, failing, to his six brothers: Richard, William, Thomas, Robert, Gilbert, and Philip, and the heirs male of their bodies. Lord Byron died childless and was succeeded according to the special remainder by his next eldest brother Richard, the second Baron.

The latter's great-grandson, the fifth Baron, killed his cousin and neighbour William Chaworth in a duel on 26 January 1765. He was brought before his peers in the House of Lords but under the statute of Edward VI he was found guilty only of manslaughter and forced to pay a small fine. Byron henceforth became known as "the Wicked Lord" and "the Devil Byron".

He was succeeded by his great-nephew, George Gordon Byron, the sixth Baron, the famous Romantic poet. He was the son of John "Mad Jack" Byron, son of Vice-Admiral John "Foulweather Jack" Byron, second son of the fourth Baron and the younger brother of the fifth Baron. Lord Byron died without male issue and was succeeded by his first cousin, the seventh Baron, who was an admiral in the Royal Navy.

On the death of his great-grandson, the eleventh Baron (who had succeeded his first cousin once-removed in 1949), this line of the family expired. The late Baron was succeeded by his distant relative (his fifth cousin), the twelfth Baron. He was the great-great-great-grandson of Reverend Richard Byron, third son of the fourth Baron. As of 2009, the title is held by his second son, the thirteenth Baron, who succeeded in 1989.

From the 16th century until 1818, the family residence of the Lords Byron was Newstead Abbey in Nottinghamshire. Most of the Byrons—including the sixth baron's daughter, the famed mathematician Ada Lovelace—are buried in the family vault in the nearby Church of St. Mary Magdalene, Hucknall.

== Barons Byron (1643) ==
- John Byron, 1st Baron Byron (1599–1652)
- Richard Byron, 2nd Baron Byron (1606–1679)
- William Byron, 3rd Baron Byron (1636–1695)
- William Byron, 4th Baron Byron (1669–1736)
- William Byron, 5th Baron Byron (1722–1798)
- George Gordon Byron, 6th Baron Byron (1788–1824), the English Romantic poet
- George Anson Byron, 7th Baron Byron (1789–1868)
- George Anson Byron, 8th Baron Byron (1818–1870)
- George Frederick William Byron, 9th Baron Byron (1855–1917)
- Frederick Ernest Charles Byron, 10th Baron Byron (1861–1949)
- Rupert Frederick George Byron, 11th Baron Byron (1903–1983)
- Richard Geoffrey Gordon Byron, 12th Baron Byron (1899–1989)
- Robert James Byron, 13th Baron Byron (b. 1950)

The heir apparent is the present holder's son, Charles Richard Gordon Byron (b. 1990).

== Family tree ==
Sir John Byron (died 1623)
John Byron, 1st Baron Byron; 1599–1652	Richard Byron, 2nd Baron Byron; 1606–1679
William Byron, 3rd Baron Byron; 1636–1695
William Byron, 4th Baron Byron; 1669–1736
William Byron, 5th Baron Byron; 1722–1798	Vice Admiral; John Byron; 1723–1786	The Reverend; Richard Byron; 1724–1811
John "Mad Jack" Byron; 1756–1791	George Anson Byron; 1758–1793	Rear admiral Richard Byron; 1769–1837
George Gordon Byron, 6th Baron Byron; 1788–1824	Admiral; George Anson Byron, 7th Baron Byron; 1789–1868	The Reverend; John Byron; 1804–1878
George Anson Byron, 8th Baron Byron; 1818–1870	Frederick Byron; 1822–1861	The Reverend; William Byron; 1831–1907	Major-general; John Byron; 1832–1895
George Frederick William Byron, 9th Baron Byron; 1855–1917	The Reverend; Frederick Ernest Charles Byron, 10th Baron Byron; 1861–1949	Wilfrid Byron; 1871–1936	Colonel; Richard Byron; 1870–1939
Rupert Frederick George Byron, 11th Baron Byron; 1903–1983	Lieutenant-Colonel Richard Geoffrey Gordon Byron, 12th Baron Byron; 1899–1989
Robert James Byron, 13th Baron Byron b.1950
Charles Richard Gordon Byron born 1990; Heir Apparent
