= Mary Harcourt, Viscountess Harcourt =

American-English aristocrat and philanthropist

The Right Honourable The Viscountess Harcourt GBE
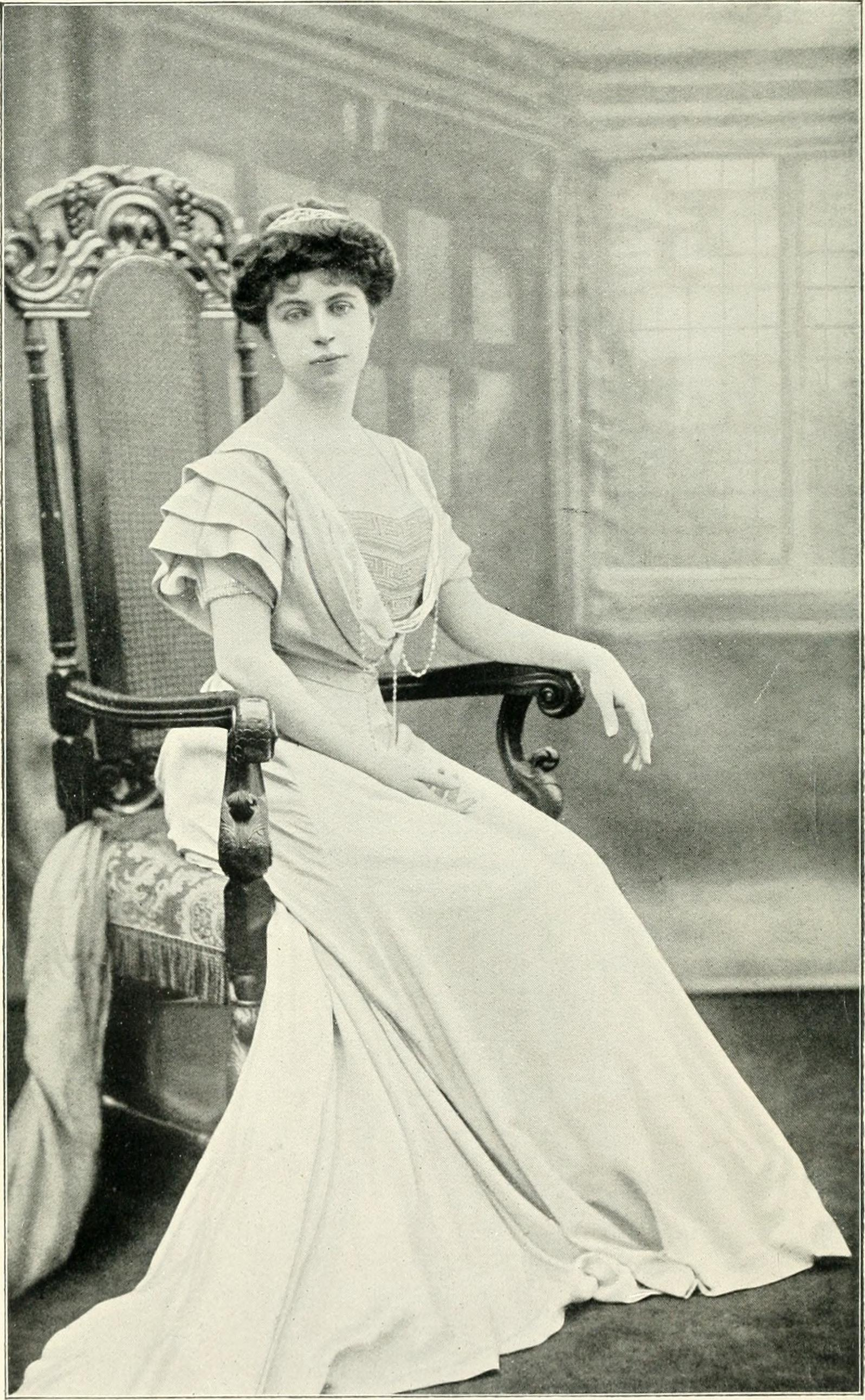
- Harcourt, c. 1911

Personal details
- Born: Mary Ethel Burns; 26 August 1874 Paris, France
- Died: 7 January 1961 (aged 86) Westminster, London
- Spouse: Lewis Harcourt, 1st Viscount Harcourt (m. 1899; died 1922)
- Relations: J.P. Morgan (uncle); J.P. Morgan Jr. (cousin)
- Children: 4, including Doris Harcourt and William Harcourt
- Parent(s): Walter Hayes Burns; Mary Lyman Morgan Burns
- Awards: Médaille de la Reine-Élisabeth

Mary Ethel Harcourt, Viscountess Harcourt GBE (née Burns; 26 August 1874 – 7 January 1961) was an American-born British aristocrat and philanthropist.

== Early life ==
Mary Ethel was born on 26 August 1874 in Paris, France. She was a daughter of American banker Walter Hayes Burns (1838–1897) and his wife, Mary Lyman (née Morgan) Burns (1844–1919), who lived at 69 Brook Street in Grosvenor Square, London and North Mymms Park in the English county of Hertfordshire. She had two older siblings, William Burns, who died young, and American-born British art collector Walter Spencer Morgan Burns (lord of the manor of North Mymms, who in 1907 married Ruth Evelyn Cavendish-Bentinck, a daughter of William and Elizabeth (née Livingston) Cavendish-Bentinck).

A member of the American Morgan family banking dynasty, her mother was a sister of banker J. Pierpont Morgan, both children of Junius Spencer Morgan and Juliet (née Pierpont) Morgan (daughter of poet John Pierpont). Her paternal grandparents were William Burns and Mary (née Leaming) Burns.

== Career ==
Through her, the Harcourt family acquired the famous "Harcourt emeralds". According to her husband's obituary in The New York Times, she was "very popular, and more than doubled her husband's social successes, which were an asset to past Liberal Cabinets."

Mary, Viscountess Harcourt, was appointed a Lady of Grace of the Order of St John and then Dame Grand Cross of the Order of the British Empire (GBE) in 1918, as well as the silver medal of the American Red Cross and the Belgian Médaille de la Reine-Élisabeth After her husband's death in 1922, she became chairman of the council of the Society for the Overseas Settlement of British Women in 1927.

== Personal life ==
Photograph of her husband, the Viscount Harcourt.

On 1 July 1899, she was married to Lewis Vernon Harcourt (1863–1922) at St Margaret's, Westminster. Lewis, whose nickname was "Loulou", was the only surviving son of politician Sir William Vernon Harcourt (former Home Secretary and Chancellor of the Exchequer) and his first wife, Theresa (née Villiers) Lister Harcourt (sister of George Villiers, 4th Earl of Clarendon). From 1910 to 1915, he served as Secretary of State for the Colonies under Prime Minister H. H. Asquith. Together, Lord and Lady Harcourt had four children:

- Hon. Doris Mary Thérèse Harcourt (1900–1981), who married Alexander Baring, 6th Baron Ashburton.
- Hon. Olivia Vernon Harcourt (1902–1984), who served as Woman of the Bedchamber to Queen Elizabeth the Queen Mother, and married the Hon. Godfrey John Mulholland, a younger son of 2nd Baron Dunleath.
- Hon. Barbara Vernon Harcourt (1905–1961), who married Robert Jenkinson in 1927. They divorced she remarried William James Baird in 1937. She died in 1961, by self-inflicted gunshot wound, a few months after her husband's death.
- William Edward Harcourt, 2nd Viscount Harcourt (1908–1979), who succeeded as Viscount Harcourt at age 13.

Lord Harcourt died in his sleep at his London town house at 69, Brook Street (now the Savile Club) in the early hours of 24 February 1922, aged 59. He had taken an overdose of a sleeping draught, and there were rumours of suicide following accusations of sexual impropriety by Edward James, a young Etonian who later became an important collector of surrealist and other contemporary art. James's mother spread the story in society although the accusations remained unknown by the wider public for fifty years.

Lady Harcourt died nearly forty years later on 7 January 1961 in Westminster, London. She was buried at Old All Saints Church, Nuneham Courtenay.

=== Descendants ===
Through her eldest daughter, she was a grandmother of John Baring, who succeeded as 7th Baron Ashburton.
