= Bering (surname) =

Bering is a surname. Notable people with the name surname include:

- Vitus Bering (1681–1741), Danish-born Russian navigator and cartographer, namesake of the Bering Sea and Bering Strait
- Vitus Bering (1617–1675), Danish poet and historian
- Jesse Bering (born 1975), American psychologist and author
- Jonas Bering (born 1975), French musician and songwriter
- Myka Bering, fictional character in the TV series Warehouse 13

== See also ==
- Bering (disambiguation)
- Baring (surname)
- Behring (disambiguation)
