= Torchbearer =

Torchbearer may refer to:

- The Torch Bearer, a 1916 American silent film
- The Torchbearer, a 2005 Czech animated short film
- The Torchbearers, a sculpture at the University of Texas at Austin
- Torchbearer, a tabletop role-playing game created by Luke Crane
- Torchbearers International, a network of Bible schools
- VAW-125, a United States Navy squadron known as the Torch Bearers
- A person who carries the Olympic Torch

== See also ==
- Keeper of the Flame (disambiguation)
- Torch (disambiguation)
- Bearer (disambiguation)
