= Mark Baring, 8th Baron Ashburton =

British businessman and peer (born 1958)

The Right Honourable The Lord Ashburton
- Born: Mark Francis Robert Baring; 7 August 1958 (age 68)
- Predecessor: John Baring
- Spouse: Miranda Caroline Wright (m. 1983)
- Children: Aurea Baring; Frederick Baring; Patrick Baring; Flora Baring
- Parents: John Baring, 7th Baron Ashburton; Susan Mary Renwick

Mark Francis Robert Baring, 8th Baron Ashburton (born 17 August 1958), known as the Honourable Mark Baring from 1991 to 2020, is a British businessman and a member of the Baring family.

== Background and education ==
Baring is the second child, and elder son, of John Baring, 7th Baron Ashburton, and his first wife, Susan Renwick, daughter of Robert Renwick, 1st Baron Renwick. His parents divorced in 1984. He succeeded as Baron Ashburton on his father's death on 6 October 2020.

Lewis Harcourt, 1st Viscount Harcourt, and Mary Ethel Burns, granddaughter of Junius Spencer Morgan and niece of American banking magnate J. P. Morgan, were his great-grandparents through his paternal grandmother, Doris, Baroness Ashburton (née Harcourt).

== Marriage and children ==
Baring married Miranda Caroline Wright (born 1961) on 29 October 1983. They have four children:

- Hon. Aurea Rose Baring (born 1988)
- Hon. Frederick Charles Francis Baring (born 1990, heir apparent)
- Hon. Patrick Robin John Baring (born 1995)
- Hon. Flora Baring (born 1997)

Peerage of the United Kingdom
Preceded by John Baring	Baron Ashburton; 2nd creation 2020–present	Incumbent; Heir apparent: Hon. Frederick Baring
