= John Baring =

John Baring may refer to:

- Johann Baring (1697–1748), later anglicised to John Baring, German-British merchant
- John Baring (1730–1816), MP for Exeter 1776–1802
- John Baring, 2nd Baron Revelstoke (1863–1929), senior partner of Barings Bank
- John Baring, 7th Baron Ashburton (1928–2020), British merchant banker and former chairman of BP

== See also ==
- Baring (disambiguation)
