= Baring =

Baring may refer to one of the following:

== People ==
- Baring (surname)
- Baring family

=== German-British Baring family ===
- Family Name of the Earl of Cromer
- Family Name of the Baron & Earl of Northbrook
- Family Name of the Baron Ashburton
- Family Name of the Baron Howick of Glendale
- Family Name of the Baron Revelstoke

== Places ==
- Baring, Victoria, Australia
- Baring, Saskatchewan, Canada
- Cape Baring, Northwest Territories, Canada
- Baring, Missouri, US
- Baring, Washington, US
- Baring Plantation, Maine, US
- Båring, Denmark

== Banks ==
- Barings LLC, the successor of Barings Bank
- Barings Bank, a bank created in 1762 and closed in 1995
- Baring Private Equity Asia, an Asian private equity firm

== Ships ==
- Baring (1801 Indiaman), a merchant vessel of the East India Company, later a convict transport
- Baring (1809 ship), a merchant vessel

== Other uses ==
- Baring Road

== See also ==
- Sabine Baring-Gould (1834–1924), English antiquarian and writer
- William S. Baring-Gould (1913–1967), Sherlock Holmes scholar
- William Baring du Pré (1875–1946), British Conservative MP
- Bearing (disambiguation)
- Bering (disambiguation)
