= Bering =

Bering may refer to:

- Vitus Bering (1681–1741), Danish-born Russian explorer and navigator
- Maritime features of Alaska/Siberia region:
  - Bering Sea, body of water in the North Pacific Ocean
  - Bering Strait, sea strait between Russia and Alaska
  - Bering Island, off Kamchatka Peninsula in Bering Sea
  - Bering land bridge, Pleistocene-ice-ages route between continents
- Bering (surname)
- Bering (horse), Thoroughbred racer
- Bering, East Sikkim, small village in East Sikkim, India
- Bering Truck, former American truck manufacturer and distributor
- Bering, a raccoon in Brother Bear 2

== See also ==
- Baring (disambiguation)
- Bearing (disambiguation)
- Behring (disambiguation)
