= Doris Harcourt =

The Right Honourable The Lady Ashburton
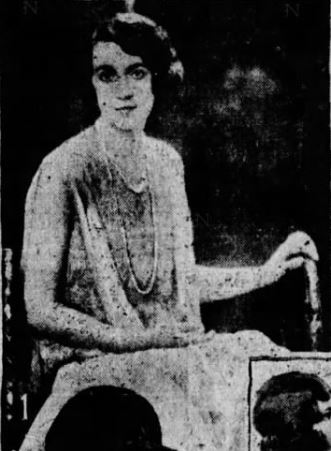
- Born: Doris Mary Thérèse Harcourt; 30 March 1900; St George Hanover Square, London, United Kingdom
- Died: 9 May 1981 (aged 81); Winchester, Hampshire, England
- Spouse: Alexander Baring, 6th Baron Ashburton (m. 1924)
- Issue: John Baring, 7th Baron Ashburton; Alexander Baring
- Parents: Lewis Harcourt, 1st Viscount Harcourt; Mary Ethel Burns

Doris Mary Thérèse Baring, Baroness Ashburton (née Harcourt; 30 March 1900 – 9 May 1981) was an English socialite, part of the "Bright Young Things" of the early 20th century.

== Early life ==
Doris Mary Thérèse Harcourt was born on 30 March 1900, the daughter of Lewis Harcourt, 1st Viscount Harcourt, and Mary Ethel Burns. Her mother was the daughter of Anglo-American banker Walter Hayes Burns and the former Mary Lyman Morgan (sister of J. Pierpont Morgan).

At 18 months, they found that Doris Harcourt had a weak leg and she was subjected to electric shock treatment and steel supports were put in her boots.

== Personal life ==
On 17 November 1924, she married Alexander Baring, the only son of Francis Baring, 5th Baron Ashburton and the former Claire Hortense. After his father died in 1938, he became the 6th Baron Ashburton. Together, they had two sons:

- John Francis Harcourt Baring (1928–2020), who succeeded as 7th Baron Ashburton and married Susan Mary Renwick, a daughter of Robert Renwick, 1st Baron Renwick. They divorced in 1984 and he remarried to Sarah Cornelia Spencer-Churchill, a daughter of John Spencer-Churchill, a grandniece of Prime Minister Winston Churchill.
- Hon. Robin Alexander Baring (b. 1931), who married Anne Caroline Thalia Gage (b. 1931), eldest daughter of the High Sheriff of Shropshire, Maj. Edward F. P. Gage of Chateau de Combecave, in 1960.

Through her marriage, the Baring family acquired the famous Harcourt emeralds.

She died in 1981.
