= Youth group =

Youth group may refer to:

- Youth organization
  - Youth club, a social and activities club for young people
    - Youth ministry, an age-specific type of religious ministry
- Youth Group, an Australian band
- "Youth Group", a song from the EP Preacher's Kid by Semler
