= Francis Baring, 5th Baron Ashburton =

British peer and politician

The Right Honourable The Lord Ashburton DL
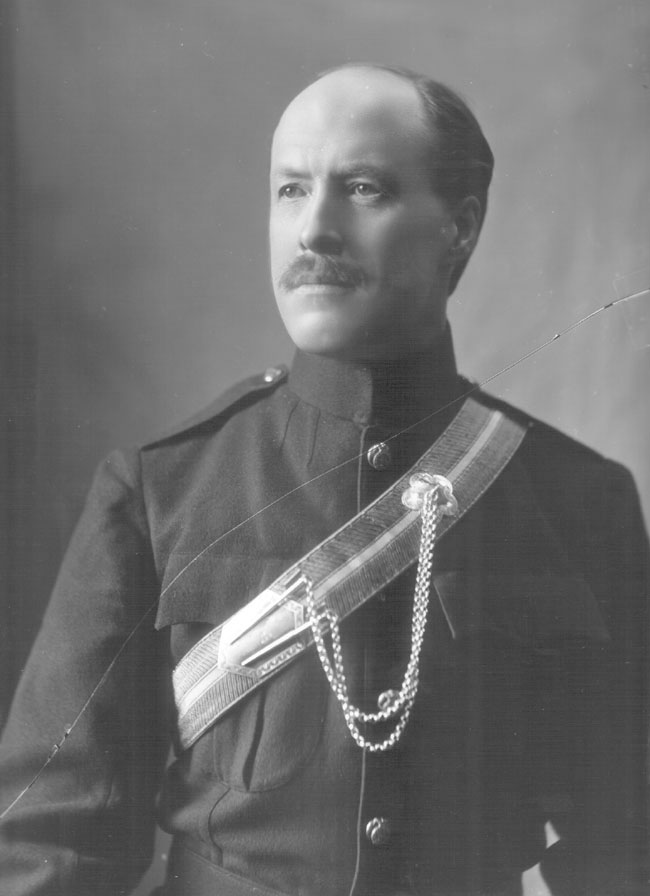
- 17 March 1900 in Service Dress, 2nd Lieutenant, Hampshire (Carabiniers) Yeomanry

Member of the House of Lords
- Lord Temporal
- In office 18 July 1889 – 27 March 1938
- Preceded by: The 4th Baron Ashburton
- Succeeded by: The 6th Baron Ashburton

Personal details
- Born: Francis Denzil Edward Baring; 20 July 1866
- Died: 27 March 1938 (aged 71) at sea, aboard RMS Queen Mary
- Spouses: Mabel Edith Hood (m. 1889; died 1904) Frances Donnelly (m. 1906)
- Children: Alexander Baring, 6th Baron Ashburton
- Parents: Alexander Baring, 4th Baron Ashburton (father); Leonora Caroline Digby (mother)

Francis Denzil Edward Baring, 5th Baron Ashburton, DL (20 July 1866 – 27 March 1938), was a British peer and politician.

== Early life ==
Baring was the son of Alexander Baring, 4th Baron Ashburton, a Member of Parliament for Thetford, and Leonora Caroline Digby. He had four younger brothers: Capt. Frederick Arthur Baring, Alexander Henry Baring, Lt. Col. Guy Baring, MP for Winchester, and Caryl Digby Baring (who married Olive Alethea Smith, daughter of Hugh Colin Smith).

His maternal grandparents were Edward Digby, 9th Baron Digby, and the former Lady Theresa Fox-Strangways (eldest daughter of Henry Fox-Strangways, 3rd Earl of Ilchester). His paternal grandparents were MP Francis Baring, 3rd Baron Ashburton, and Hortense Maret (a daughter of Hugues-Bernard Maret, duc de Bassano, the 12th Prime Minister of France). Through his father's family, he was a member of the German Baring family and a descendant of American statesman William Bingham.

== Career ==
He succeeded to the title of Baron Ashburton, of Ashburton, Devon, on 18 July 1889 and took his seat in the House of Lords. He was an officer in the Hampshire Yeomanry (Carabiniers), where he was appointed a lieutenant on 17 August 1901, promoted to captain on 6 December 1902, and ended as major.

In 1891, Baring was appointed to be a Deputy Lieutenant of the County of Southampton.

== Personal life ==
On 25 July 1889, he was married to Mabel Edith Hood, at St. George's Church, St. George Street, Hanover Square, London, England. She was the eldest daughter of Francis Hood, 4th Viscount Hood, and the former Edith Lydia Drummond Ward. Before her death, they were the parents of four daughters and one son:

- Venetia Marjorie Mabel Baring (1890–1937), a Maid of Honour to Queen Mary.
- Aurea Versa Baring (1891–1975), who married Maj. Charles Balfour, a grandson of Mark McDonnell, 5th Earl of Antrim.
- Angela Mildred Baring (1893–1995), who died unmarried.
- Violet Alma Madeline Baring (1895–1924), who died unmarried.
- Alexander Francis St. Vincent Baring, 6th Baron Ashburton (1898–1991), who married Doris Harcourt, the eldest daughter of Lewis Harcourt, 1st Viscount Harcourt.

After the death of his first wife in 1904, he married the American actress Frances Donnelly, whose stage name was "Frances Belmont", on 19 February 1906. Frances, one of the original "Florodora" sextet of 1901, was a daughter of James Caryll Donnelly of New York.

One of Britain's foremost yachtsmen, he commissioned the luxury steam yacht Venetia in 1893. The ship was sold to Whittaker Wright in 1898 and renamed Sybarite nd to Cornelius Vanderbilt in 1902 who renamed her the North Star. She was requisitioned by the British Navy in WW1 and converted into a hospital ship.

Lord Ashburton died of a heart attack aboard the RMS Queen Mary on 27 March 1938. His widow died on 31 March 1959.

Peerage of the United Kingdom
Preceded by Alexander Baring	Baron Ashburton; 2nd creation 1889–1938; Member of the House of Lords (1889–1938)	Succeeded by Alexander Baring
