= Posture =

Posture or posturing may refer to:

== Medicine ==
- List of human positions
  - Abnormal posturing, in neurotrauma
  - Spinal posture
- Posturography, in neurology

== Other uses ==
- Posture (psychology)
- Political posturing
- "Posture (Interlude)", a song from the EP Preacher's Kid by Semler
