= Bearing =

Bearing(s) may refer to:

- Bearing (angle), a term for direction
- Bearing (mechanical), a component that separates moving parts and takes a load
- Bridge bearing, a component separating a bridge pier and deck
- Bearing BTS Station in Bangkok
- Bearings (album), by Ronnie Montrose in 2000

== See also ==
- Posture (disambiguation)
- Bering (disambiguation)
- Baring (disambiguation)
