= Alexander Baring, 6th Baron Ashburton =

British politician and businessman (1898–1991)

The Right Honourable The Lord Ashburton KG KCVO DL
- Ashburton in 1962, by Walter Bird

Member of the House of Lords
- Lord Temporal
- In office 27 March 1938 – 12 June 1991
- Preceded by: The 5th Baron Ashburton
- Succeeded by: The 7th Baron Ashburton

Lord Lieutenant of Hampshire
- In office 1960–1973
- Preceded by: Gerald Wellesley, 7th Duke of Wellington
- Succeeded by: William Harris, 6th Earl of Malmesbury

Personal details
- Born: Alexander Francis St Vincent Baring; 7 April 1898
- Died: 12 June 1991 (aged 93)
- Spouse: Doris Harcourt (m. 1924)
- Children: John Baring, 7th Baron Ashburton; Robin Alexander Baring
- Parent: Francis Baring, 5th Baron Ashburton (father)
- Education: Eton College
- Alma mater: Royal Military College, Sandhurst

Alexander Francis St Vincent Baring, 6th Baron Ashburton (7 April 1898 – 12 June 1991), was a British businessman and politician.

== Early life ==
Baring was born on 7 April 1898. He was the only son of Francis Baring, 5th Baron Ashburton, and the former Claire Hortense. Through his father, he was a member of the German Baring family and a descendant of American statesman William Bingham. He had four sisters, only one of whom married: Aurea Vera Baring, the wife of Maj. Charles Balfour (a grandson of Mark McDonnell, 5th Earl of Antrim).

His maternal grandfather was French statesman Hugues-Bernard Maret, duc de Bassano, and his paternal grandparents were Alexander Baring, 4th Baron Ashburton, a Member of Parliament for Thetford, and the Hon. Leonora Digby (a daughter of Edward Digby, 9th Baron Digby).

He was educated at Eton and the Royal Military College, Sandhurst.

== Career ==
From 1917 to 1923, during the First World War, he saw active service as a Lieutenant with the Royal Scots Greys. After the war, he served as a Managing Director of the family bank, Baring Brothers, from 1928 to 1962.

In the Second World War, he served in the Auxiliary Air Force as Flight lieutenant in 1939 and as Group captain from 1939 to 1944. After the War, he returned to his career as a bank director in the City of London before serving as chairman from 1962 to 1968. He also served as a director of Alliance Assurance (from 1932 to 1968), a member of the London Committee of the Hong Kong and Shanghai Banking Corporation (from 1935 to 1939), a director of Pressed Steel (from 1944 to 1966).

Ashburton served as Deputy Lieutenant of Hampshire from 1951 to 1973 (where he served as a member of Hampshire County Council) and Vice Lieutenant of Hampshire from 1951 to 1960. From 1960 to 1973, he was Lord Lieutenant and Custos Rotulorum of Hampshire and the Isle of Wight. From 1961 to 1967, he was chairman of the Hampshire Police Authority and High Steward of Winchester in 1967.

He served as treasurer of the King Edward VII Hospital Fund for London from 1955 to 1964 and a trustee of the King George V Jubilee Trust from 1949 to 1968. From 1961 to 1973, he was Receiver-General of the Duchy of Cornwall.

== Personal life ==
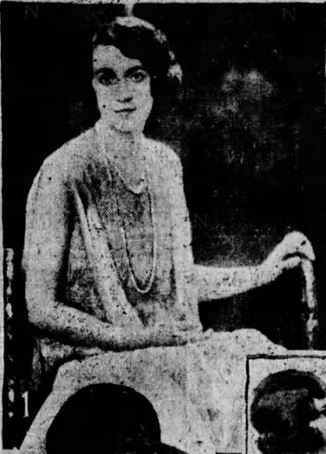
Doris Harcourt

On 17 November 1924, he was married to Doris Mary Thérèse Harcourt (1900–1981), the eldest daughter of Lewis Harcourt, 1st Viscount Harcourt, and the former Mary Ethel Burns (a niece of J. Pierpont Morgan and granddaughter of Junius Spencer Morgan). Through her, the family acquired the famous 'Harcourt emeralds'. Together, they were the parents of two sons:

- John Francis Harcourt Baring, 7th Baron Ashburton (1928–2020), who married Susan Mary Renwick, a daughter of Robert Renwick, 1st Baron Renwick. They divorced in 1984, and he remarried to Sarah Cornelia Spencer-Churchill, a daughter of John Spencer-Churchill and a grandniece of Prime Minister Winston Churchill.
- Robin Alexander Baring (born 1931), who married Anne Caroline Thalia Gage (born 1931), eldest daughter of the High Sheriff of Shropshire, Major Edward F. P. Gage of Chateau de Combecave, in 1960.

Ashburton and his family lived in Hampshire, where he was active in public life and later as Lord Lieutenant of the county.

Ashburton died in 1991, leaving two sons. The barony passed to his elder son, John. Since his death, his Garter banner has been on display at Winchester Cathedral.

== Arms ==
Coat of arms of Alexander Baring, 6th Baron Ashburton, KG, KCVO, KStJ, DL
Coronet A Baron's Coronet Crest Between two wings displayed Argent a mullet Erminois. Escutcheon Azure a fess Or in chief a bear's head couped proper muzzled and ringed Or. Supporters On either side, a bear proper muzzled, collared, chained, and charged on the shoulder with a cross formy fitchy Or. Motto VIRTUS IN ARDUIS (Fortitude under difficulties).

== Awards and decorations ==
- Knight of Justice of the Venerable Order of Saint John (1960)
- Lord Lieutenant of Hampshire (1960 to 1973)
- Knight Commander of the Royal Victorian Order (1961 Birthday Honours)
- Knight Companion of the Order of the Garter (1969)

== Sources ==
Honorary titles
Preceded by The Duke of Wellington	Lord Lieutenant of Hampshire	Succeeded by The Earl of Malmesbury
Peerage of the United Kingdom
Preceded by Francis Baring	Baron Ashburton; 2nd creation 1938–1991; Member of the House of Lords (1938–1991)	Succeeded by John Baring
