= John Dunning, 1st Baron Ashburton =

English lawyer and politician (1731-1783)

The Right Honourable The Lord Ashburton PC
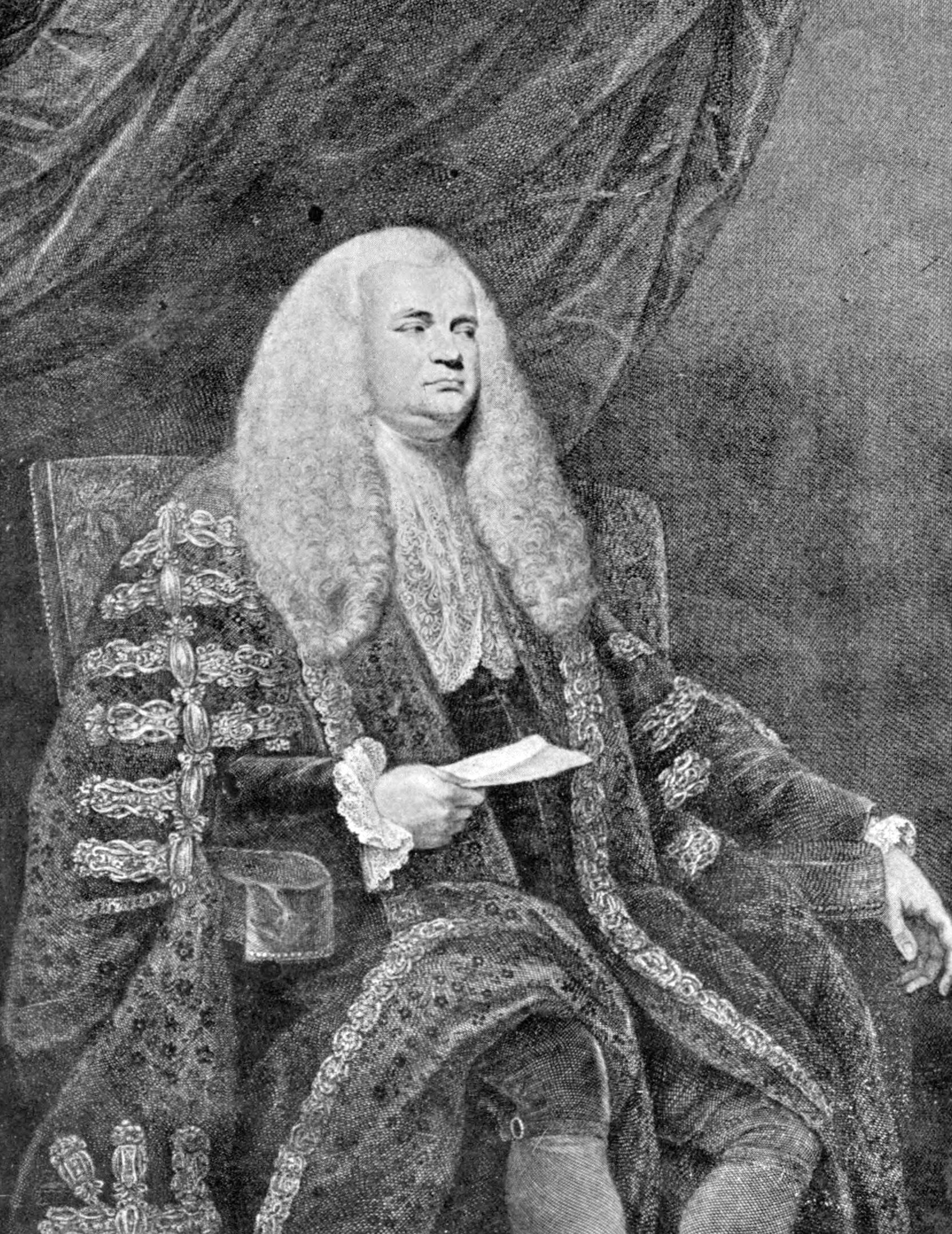
- John Dunning (later 1st Baron Ashburton), detail from an engraving of a 1782 group portrait by Sir Joshua Reynolds

Chancellor of the Duchy of Lancaster
- In office 1782–1783
- Preceded by: The Earl of Clarendon
- Succeeded by: The Earl of Derby

Solicitor General for England and Wales
- In office 1768–1770
- Preceded by: Edward Willes
- Succeeded by: Edward Thurlow

Personal details
- Born: 18 October 1731
- Died: 18 August 1783 (aged 51)

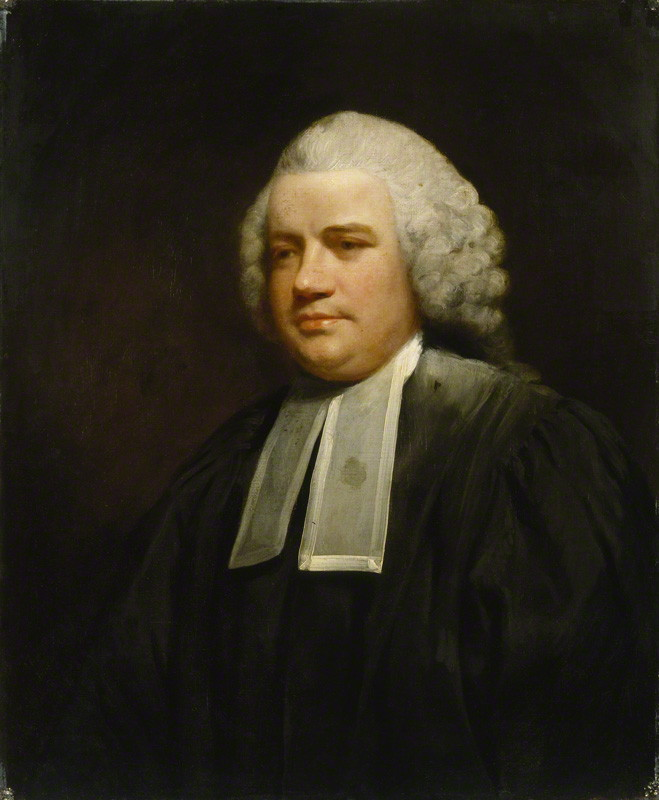
John Dunning, 1774 portrait, studio of Sir Joshua Reynolds, National Portrait Gallery, London

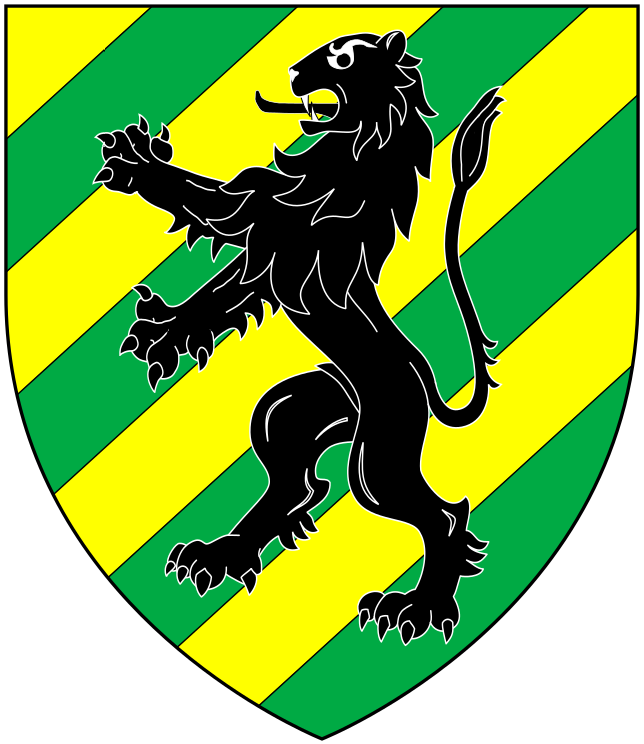
Coat of arms granted to John Dunning, 1st Baron Ashburton: Bendy sinister of eight or and vert, overall a lion rampant sable. Called by Sabine Baring-Gould "certainly a very ugly coat and bad heraldry"

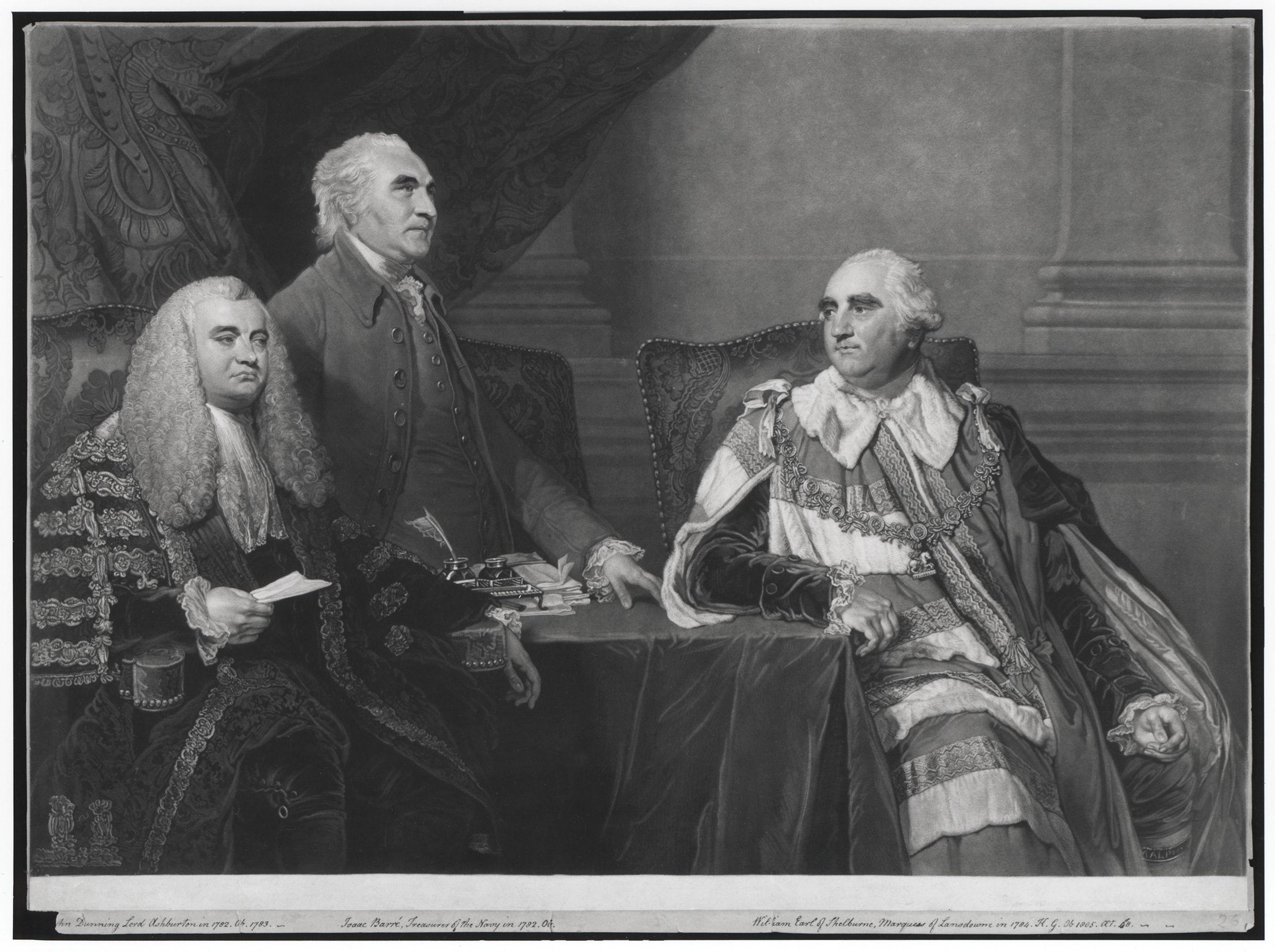
Engraving of a 1782 portrait by Sir Joshua Reynolds of John Dunning (later 1st Baron Ashburton) (left); Isaac Barré, Treasurer of the Navy in 1782 (centre); William Petty, 2nd Earl of Shelburne, Prime Minister 1782-3 (right)

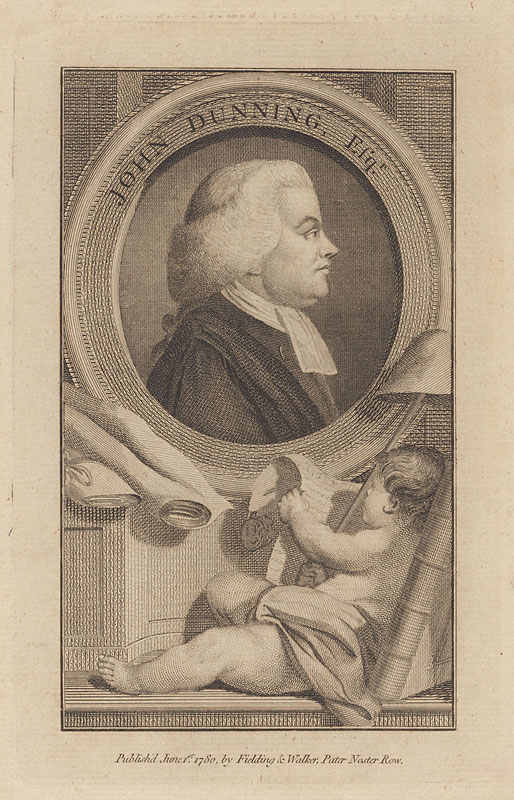
"John Dunning, Esq^{r}.", as a young man

John Dunning, 1st Baron Ashburton (18 October 1731 – 18 August 1783), of Spitchwick the parish of Widecombe-in-the-Moor, Devon, was an English lawyer and politician, born in Ashburton in Devon, who served as Solicitor General from 1768. He was first noticed in English politics when he wrote a notice in 1762 defending the British East India Company merchants against their Dutch rivals. He was a member of parliament from 1768 onward. His career in the House of Commons is best known for his motion in 1780 that "the influence of the crown has increased, is increasing, and ought to be diminished". He was created Baron Ashburton in 1782.

== Early life ==
He was born at Ashburton in Devon on 18 October 1731. He was a younger son of John Dunning of Ashburton, attorney, by his wife Agnes Judsham, daughter of Henry Judsham, attorney, of Old Port in the parish of Modbury, Devon. After receiving education at Ashburton Grammar School, he was articled to his father, who had a legal practice in the town. He went to London to study for the bar, and was admitted a student of the Middle Temple on 8 May 1752.

== Legal career ==
While a student Dunning became close to Lloyd Kenyon and John Horne Tooke. He was called to the bar on 2 July 1756, and joined the western circuit. For several years after his call he had little success. In 1762, however, John Glynn, one of the leading counsel on the circuit, suddenly fell ill, and placed his briefs in Dunning's hands. By 1764 he was making £2,000 a year, helped by his pamphlet, drawn up by Dunning on behalf of the directors of the English East India Company. In 1765 he established his legal reputation by his arguments against the legality of general warrants in the case of Leach v. Money.

In 1766 Dunning was appointed recorder of Bristol, and on 28 January 1768 he became Solicitor General in the Duke of Grafton's administration, in the place of Edward Willes, who was raised to the bench.

== Parliamentarian ==
At the general election in March 1768, Dunning, through the influence of Lord Shelburne, was returned to parliament as one of the members for the borough of Calne. Though solicitor-general, he took no part in the debate on the expulsion of John Wilkes from the house, and was absent from the division. On 9 January 1770 Dunning both spoke in favour of the amendment to the address urging an inquiry into the causes of "the unhappy discontents which at present prevail in every part of his majesty's dominions"; and a few days later tendered his resignation. On 19 March he spoke on the side of the minority in the debate on the remonstrance of the city of London. After some delay Edward Thurlow was appointed solicitor-general on 30 March 1770.

On 12 October 1770 the freedom of the city of London was voted to Dunning. In the debate which took place on 25 March 1771, Dunning made a speech against Welbore Ellis's motion to commit Alderman Richard Oliver to the Tower of London, in which he denied the right of the house to commit in such a case. Dunning opposed the third reading of the bill for regulating the government of Massachusetts Bay on 2 May 1774. At the general election in October 1774 he was re-elected for Calne, and continued to oppose the ministerial policy towards the American colonies. On 6 November 1776 he supported Lord John Cavendish's defeated motion for the "revisal of all acts of parliament by which his majesty's subjects in America think themselves aggrieved". In the next session Dunning, continued to oppose the ministry, and was instrumental in obtaining the insertion of a clause in the bill for the suspension of habeas corpus, which lessened its scope.

On 14 May 1778 Dunning seconded Sir George Savile's motion for leave to bring in a bill for the relief of Roman Catholics; and it was on his amendment that the house unanimously voted that a monument should be erected in Westminster Abbey to the memory of the Earl of Chatham. On 21 February 1780 he supported Savile's motion for an account of crown pensions; and on 6 April moved his famous resolutions that "the influence of the crown has increased, is increasing, and ought to be diminished", and that "it is competent to this house to examine into and correct abuses in the expenditure of the civil list revenues, as well as in every other branch of the public revenue, whenever it shall appear expedient to the wisdom of the house so to do". In the teeth of Lord North's opposition, the first resolution (with a slight addition) was carried by 233 to 215, and the second agreed to without a division. Dunning a few weeks later proposed an address to the king requesting him not to dissolve the parliament; he found himself in a minority of 51.

At the general election in September 1780 Dunning was again returned for Calne, and proposed the re-election of Sir Fletcher Norton as Speaker, but Cornwall, the ministerial candidate, was elected by 203 to 134. In February 1782 he supported Conway's motion against the further prosecution of the American war, and a month later announced that arrangements were being made for the formation of a new ministry. On 27 March 1782 Dunning, with Lord John Cavendish, Charles James Fox, Edmund Burke, and Augustus Keppel, was admitted to the privy council, and on 8 April was created Baron Ashburton of Ashburton in the county of Devon. The king retained Thurlow as Lord Chancellor, and Dunning was sworn in as chancellor of the Duchy of Lancaster on 17 April. He continued in the cabinet after Lord Rockingham's death, and was consulted by Shelburne in legal matters, but took little part in debates in the House of Lords.

== Works ==
Dunning was supposed by some to have been the author of A Letter to the Proprietors of East India Stock on the subject of Lord Clive's Jaghire, occasioned by his Lordship's letter on that subject (London, 1764), and also of an Inquiry into the Doctrines lately promulgated concerning Juries, Libels, &c., upon the principles of the Law and the Constitution. The joint authorship of Junius's Letters has also been attributed to him.

== Marriage and progeny ==
On 31 March 1780, Dunning married Elizabeth Baring (21 July 1744 – 23 February 1809), daughter of the Exeter cloth merchant Johann (John) Baring (1697–1748) of Larkbear House, near Exeter, Devon (born in Bremen, Germany, as Johann Baring and naturalised 1723), by his wife Elizabeth Vowler. Elizabeth was the sister of Sir Francis Baring, 1st Baronet (1740–1810), and John Baring (1730–1816), who in partnership founded the precursor to Barings Bank. In 1805, Elizabeth built to the designs of John Nash a villa rustica country house at Sandridge Park in the parish of Stoke Gabriel. By Elizabeth he had two sons:

- John Dunning (29 October 1781 – April 1783), eldest son, who predeceased his father
- Richard Dunning, 2nd Baron Ashburton (20 September 1782 – 15 February 1823), who on 17 September 1805 married Anne, daughter of William Cunninghame of Lainshaw. He died without issue at Friar's Hall, Roxburghshire, whereupon the title became extinct. The title Baron Ashburton was in 1835 re-created for his first cousin Alexander Baring, the second son of Sir Francis Baring.

== Death and succession ==
On Shelburne's resignation, Dunning had several interviews with the king, who asked his advice on the formation of a new ministry. Before the act for the reform in the civil list expenditure (22 George III, c. 82) was passed, a pension of £4,000 was granted to Dunning. His health, however, had begun to give way, and he died at Exmouth a few months after the death of his eldest child, on 18 August 1783. He was buried in the parish church of Ashburton, where a monument was erected to his memory.

Parliament of Great Britain
Preceded by John Calcraft; Thomas FitzMaurice	Member of Parliament for Calne; 1768–1782; With: Thomas FitzMaurice 1768–1774; Isaac Barré 1774–1782	Succeeded by James Townsend; Isaac Barré
Political offices
Preceded by The Earl of Clarendon	Chancellor of the Duchy of Lancaster; 1782–1783	Succeeded by The Earl of Derby
Preceded by Edward Willes	Solicitor-General; 1768–1770	Succeeded by Edward Thurlow
Peerage of Great Britain
New creation	Baron Ashburton; 1st creation 1782–1783	Succeeded by Richard Dunning
