= Bearer =

Bearer may refer to:

- Beam (structure) or bearer, a structural element
- Bearer (carrier) or porter, a person who carries objects
- Bearer channel, a telecommunications term
- Bearer instrument, a type of document
- Bearer token, a type of security token in OAuth and other frameworks that gives access to its bearer
- Armiger, person entitled to bear arms
- Ownership

== See also ==
- Bear (disambiguation)
- Bearing (disambiguation)
