= Richard Dunning, 2nd Baron Ashburton =

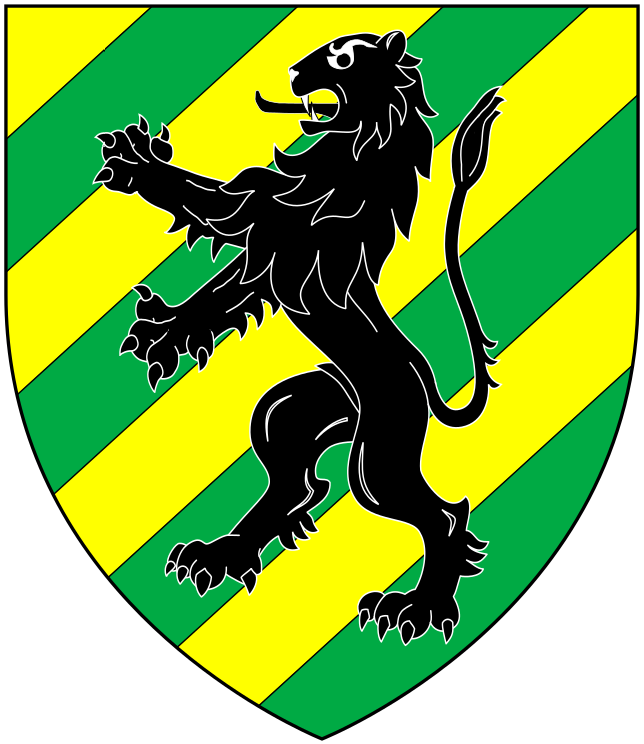
Arms of Dunning, Baron Ashburton: Bendy sinister of eight or and vert, overall a lion rampant sable

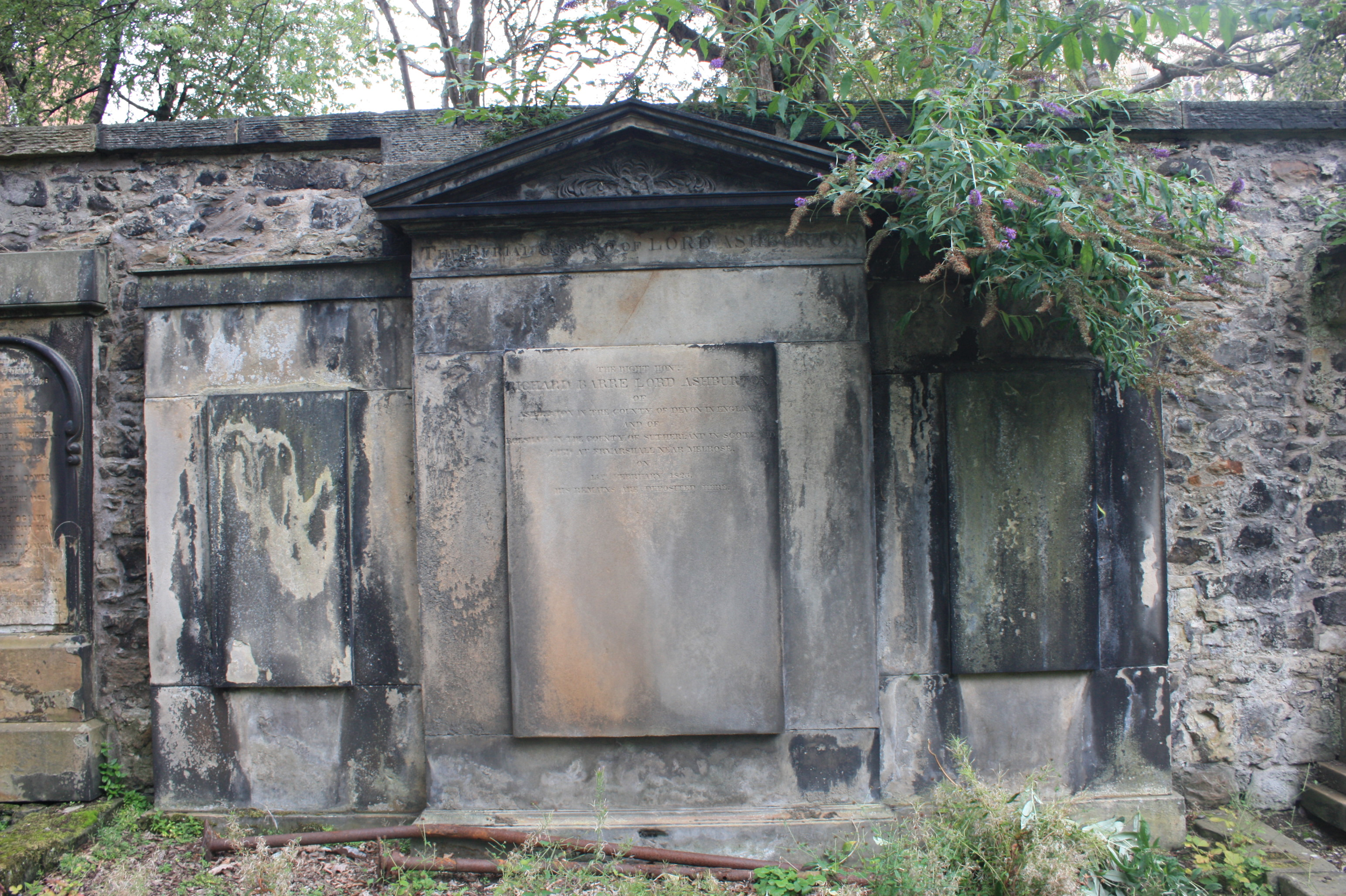
Lord Ashburton's grave, St Cuthberts Churchyard, Edinburgh

The Right Hon. Richard Barré Dunning, 2nd Baron Ashburton (20 September 1782 – 15 February 1823), was a British peer and politician.

== Life ==
Dunning's parents were John Dunning, 1st Baron Ashburton, and Elizabeth Baring.

Dunning succeeded to the title on 18 August 1783 as a one-year-old, he was educated at Edinburgh University, and later took his seat in the House of Lords. The barony became extinct on his death at the age of 40 at Friar's Hall. The book Genealogical Memoirs of the French Royal House was written by him.

He died at Fryars Hall near Melrose on 15 February 1823 and is buried against the north wall of the north churchyard extension in St Cuthberts Churchyard in Edinburgh.

== Family ==
On 17 September 1805, he married Anne Selby Cunninghame at Lainshaw. They had no issue.

== Sources ==
Peerage of Great Britain
Preceded by John Dunning	Baron Ashburton; 1st creation 1783–1823	Extinct
