= Semler (musician) =

American musician and media host

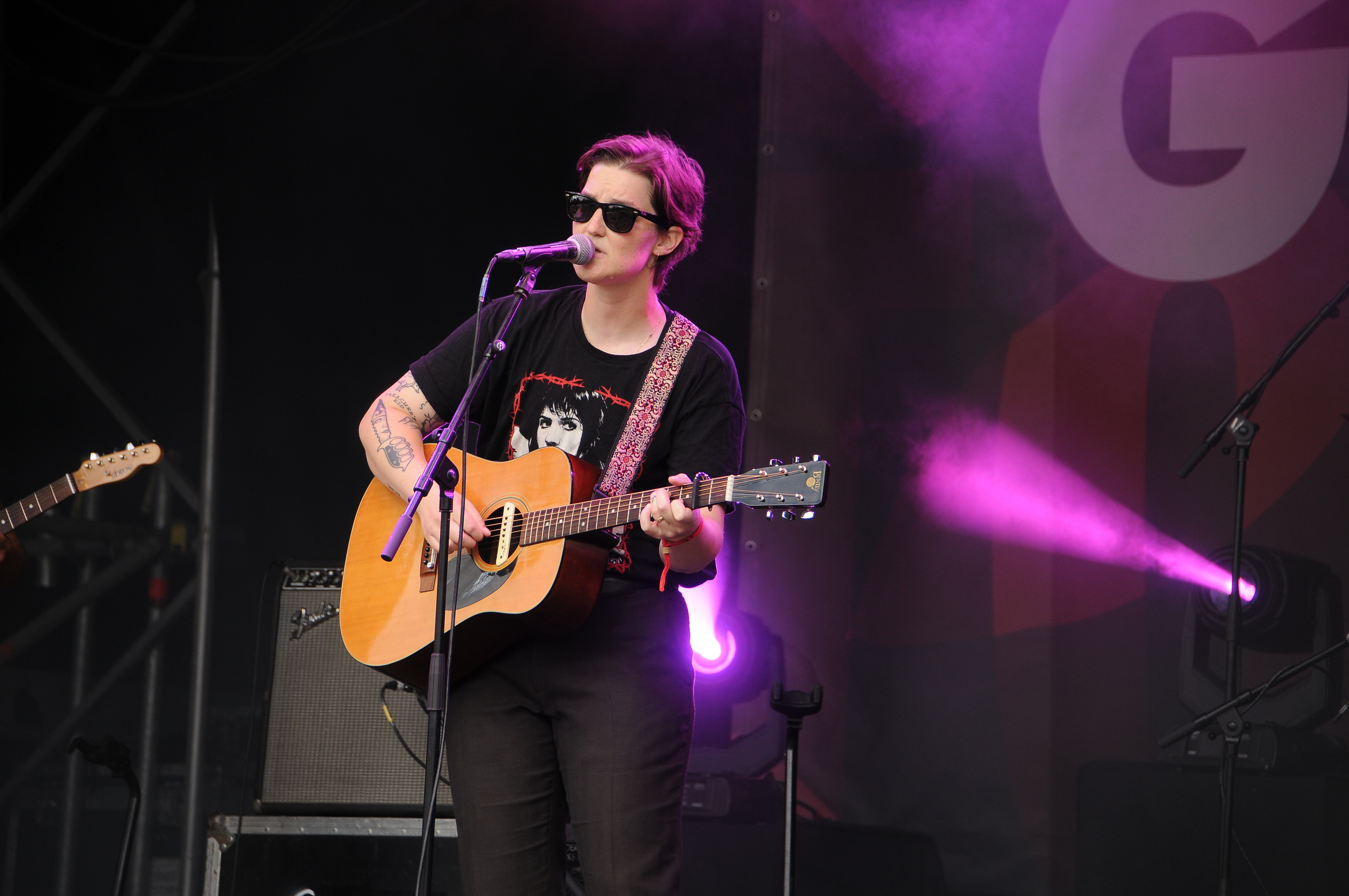
- Semler performing at Greenbelt Festival 2025
- Born: Grace Semler Baldridge; November 12, 1990 (age 35); Hilton Head Island, South Carolina, U.S.
- Education: Elon University
- Occupations: Musician; Media host
- Spouse: Elizabeth Baldridge (m. 2018)
- Musical career
- Instruments: Vocals; guitar
- Website: semlermusic.com

Grace Semler Baldridge (born November 12, 1990), known by the stage name Semler, is an American host and alt-Christian singer-songwriter.

== Work ==
=== Music ===
Baldridge writes and records music as Semler. The name was chosen both because of the name's links to their (Note: Baldridge uses all pronouns. This article uses they/them for consistency.) maternal family history and because they prefer their music to be experienced from a gender-neutral viewpoint.

In February 2021, they released an EP, Preacher's Kid, about being a queer Christian, which they recorded at home and promoted themselves. Shortly after release, it reached the top of the iTunes Christian chart, supplanting Lauren Daigle's Look Up Child. Michel Martin interviewed Baldridge about Preacher's Kid for NPR in March 2021, discussing their faith and music and playing the single "Jesus from Texas". The album earned support from several figures in the Christian music industry, including Kevin Max, Trey Pearson, Derek Webb, and Josh Lovelace.

Their second EP, titled Late Bloomer, was released on October 22, 2021. Like its predecessor, it reached first place on the iTunes Christian charts, once again displacing Lauren Daigle's Look Up Child.

Their third EP, titled Stages of a Breakdown, was released on April 13, 2022.

They toured with Katie Pruitt in 2021, and Relient K in 2022.

Their debut album, titled Revival In My Mind, was released on February 21, 2025.

=== Media Presenting ===
Baldridge was a regular guest host of The Young Turks, and co-hosted the former TYT Network show Pop Trigger. They created and hosted the TYT-associated YouTube series Murder with Friends, which was nominated for Best Non-Fiction Series in the 7th Streamy Awards in 2017.

In 2020, Baldridge hosted a documentary series entitled State of Grace, which covered being LGBTQ and Christian, produced by Refinery29. The first episode, "The Life Threatening Dangers Of Gay Conversion Therapy", was nominated at the 31st GLAAD Media Awards for the Outstanding Digital Journalism – Multimedia award.

== Personal life ==
Baldridge's father is a priest in the Episcopal Church. They spent their early life in Delaware but their family moved to Waterloo, Belgium, when they were in third grade. They returned to the US to attend Elon University.

Baldridge is queer. They met their future wife, Elizabeth Capel, during their time at Elon University. The two married in August 2018 in an Episcopal ceremony, and the couple's wedding was featured in an episode of the Refinery29 series World Wide Wed. Their Twitter post giving coming out advice to themself as a teenager attracted national attention. As of 2021, Baldridge and Capel live in Los Angeles, California.

Baldridge is genderqueer and non-binary, and has stated that "all pronouns are totally fine".

== Discography ==
=== Albums ===
- Six Feet Under All the Same (2018)
- Preacher's Kid (2021)
- Revival In My Mind (2025)
- Live from Los Angeles (2025)
- Mirages (2026)

=== EPs ===
- Of the Things that Matter (2017)
- Late Bloomer (2021)
- Stages of a Breakdown (2022)
- Night Aches (2023)
- Real Estate (2026)
