= Baring (surname) =

Baring is a surname. Notable people with the surname include:

- Baring family, a German-British banking family
- Alexander Baring, 1st Baron Ashburton (1774–1848), British banker
- Alexander Baring, 4th Baron Ashburton (1835–1889), British landowner and politician
- Arnulf Baring (1932–2019), German historian
- Bingham Baring, 2nd Baron Ashburton (1799–1864)
- Charles Baring (1807–1879), Bishop of Durham
- Charles Baring, 2nd Baron Howick of Glendale (born 1937), English horticulturalist
- Edward Baring, 1st Baron Revelstoke (1828–1897), British banker
- Evelyn Baring, 1st Earl of Cromer (1841–1917), British colonial administrator
- Evelyn Baring, 1st Baron Howick of Glendale (1903–1973), Governor of Kenya
- Sir Francis Baring, 1st Baronet (1740–1810), English merchant banker who established merchant house of Barings
- Francis Baring, 1st Baron Northbrook (1796–1866), British Whig politician, First Lord of the Admiralty
- Francis Baring, 6th Baron Northbrook (born 1954), British peer and Conservative politician
- Fred Baring (1890–1961), Australian rules footballer
- Georg Baring (Baron Georg von Baring) (1773–1848), Hanoverian officer in the King's German Legion
- Giles Baring (1910–1986), English cricketer
- Guy Baring (1873–1916), British MP and army officer
- Henry Bingham Baring (1804–1869), British Conservative MP
- John Baring (1730–1816), English merchant, banker and MP
- James Baring, 6th Baron Revelstoke (1938–2012)
- John Baring, 7th Baron Ashburton (1928–2020), British merchant banker and former Chairman of BP
- Mark Baring, 8th Baron Ashburton (born 1958), British businessman
- Maurice Baring (1874–1945), English man of letters
- Norah Baring (1907–1985), British movie actress
- Rowland Baring, 2nd Earl of Cromer (1877–1953), English Lord Chamberlain
- Rowland Baring, 3rd Earl of Cromer (1918–1991), British Ambassador to US and Governor of the Bank of England
- Sarah Baring (1920–2013), English socialite and Bletchley Park linguist
- Thomas Baring (1799–1873), English banker and Conservative MP
- Thomas Charles Baring (1831–1891), British banker and Conservative MP
- Thomas Baring, 1st Earl of Northbrook (1826–1904), British Viceroy of India and politician
- Walter S. Baring Jr. (1911–1975), United States Representative from Nevada
