= John Spencer Churchill (artist) =

English artist (1909–92)

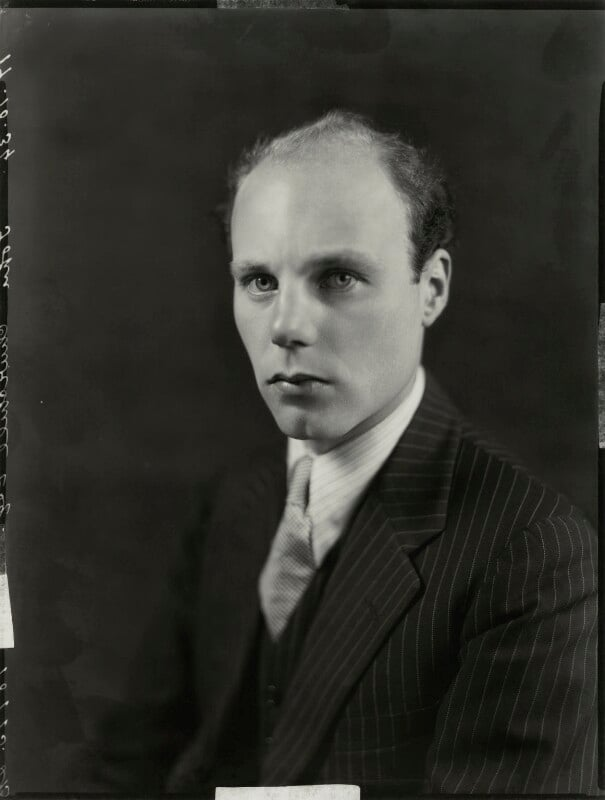
- Spencer Churchill in 1934
- Born: 31 May 1909; London, England
- Died: 23 June 1992 (aged 83); London, England
- Resting place: Bladon, West Oxfordshire
- Education: Harrow School
- Alma mater: Pembroke College, Oxford
- Spouses: Angela Culme Seymour (m. 1934; div. 1938) Mary Cookson (m. 1941; div. 1953) Kathlyn Tandy (m. 1953; died 1957) Lullan Janson Boston (m. 1958; div. 1972)
- Children: 1
- Parent(s): John Spencer-Churchill; Lady Gwendoline Theresa Mary Bertie
- Family: Spencer-Churchill

John George Spencer Churchill (31 May 1909 – 23 June 1992) was an English painter, sculptor, and stockbroker who was the nephew of Sir Winston Churchill.

== Early life ==
Spencer Churchill was the son of John Strange "Jack" Spencer-Churchill (1880–1947) and Lady Gwendoline Theresa Mary Bertie (1885–1941). His sister Clarissa married Anthony Eden in 1952, becoming Lady Eden in 1954 when he was made a Knight of the Garter, wife of the Prime Minister when Winston Churchill retired in 1955, and later the Countess of Avon in 1961 on his elevation to the peerage.

His paternal grandparents were Lord Randolph Churchill, the third son of the 7th Duke of Marlborough, and his wife, Lady Frances Vane, and Lady Randolph Churchill (née Jennie Jerome), an American who was the daughter of Leonard Jerome, one of the richest and most influential men in New York City in the middle to late 19th century, and a frequent business partner of Cornelius Vanderbilt. Through the Jerome family, he was a cousin of Clare Sheridan, the sculptor. Through his uncle Winston, he was a first cousin of Diana Churchill, Randolph Churchill, Sarah Tuchet-Jesson, Lady Audley, Marigold Churchill, and Mary Soames, Baroness Soames.

His maternal grandparents were Montagu Bertie, 7th Earl of Abingdon, and Gwendoline Mary Dormer, the daughter of James Charlemagne Dormer, a British Army officer.

== Career ==
Spencer Churchill was educated at Harrow School and Pembroke College, Oxford. Following his graduation, he worked for the London stock exchange firm of Vickers da Costa, where his father was a partner.

He was taken under the wing of Sir William Nicholson when he toured Italy aged only twenty-three years. Later he met Bernard Meninsky travelling from Munich to Madrid. He was still there in Malaga during the Spanish Civil War sketching for the Illustrated London News.

He painted for Lady Churchill at Chartwell on many projects, doing murals and friezes that exist today.

He served in the Second World War as a Corps Camouflage Officer, and after returning from Dunkirk, told his uncle personally of the need for small boats to assist in rescuing the troops there. After the war ended, he founded the interior-decorating business George Spencer.

In 1961 he published his memoir, Crowded Canvas. The New York Times described the book as telling the first 50 years of his life, and as for the future, it quoted him stating: "The First Duke of Marlborough was 52 when he fought the Battle of Blenheim. My uncle was 64 when he attained his greatest role. I still have time for the uplands of greater achievement"

== Personal life ==
On 13 May 1934, he married Angela Mary Culme-Seymour (1912–2012) in Portofino, Italy. She was the daughter of Major George Culme-Seymour, who was killed during the Second Battle of Ypres in 1915, and Janet Beatrix Orr-Ewing, and the granddaughter of Sir Michael Culme-Seymour, 3rd Baronet. The family lived briefly with the Winston Churchills at Chartwell, before returning to Spain but the marriage did not last long, for Angela formed a relationship with a Frenchman, René Guillet de Chatellus whom she married in 1948. Before their divorce in 1938, they were the parents of:

- Sarah Cornelia Spencer-Churchill (b. 1935), who married James Colin Crewe (1922–2015), the son of Major James Hugh Hamilton Crewe and Lady Annabel Hungerford Crewe-Milnes, on 19 November 1957; they had a son and two daughters. She married, secondly, John Baring, 7th Baron Ashburton, son of Alexander Baring, 6th Baron Ashburton and Hon. Doris Mary Thérèse Harcourt, in 1987.

In 1941, he married Mary Cookson. After that marriage was dissolved in 1953, he married Mrs. Kathlyn Tandy (d. 1957). After his third wife's death in 1957, he married Lullan (née Janson) Boston in 1958. His fourth marriage was dissolved 1972.
