= Keeper of the Flame =

Keeper(s) of the Flame or Flamekeeper(s) may refer to:

== Film and television ==
- Keeper of the Flame (film), a 1942 American film directed by George Cukor
- Keepers of the Flame, a 2005 documentary film produced by Eddie Kamae
- Keepers of the Flame, a 2003 play by Sean O'Brien
- Keepers of the Flame, a 2014 Australian BBQ cooking show hosted by Henry Wagons
- "The Flamekeepers", a 2023 episode of Silo

== Music ==
- Flamekeeper, the backup band for Michael Cleveland

=== Albums ===
- Keeper of the Flame (Golden Earring album) or the title song, 1989
- Keeper of the Flame (The Hiatus album), 2014
- Keeper of the Flame (Richie Cole album) or the title song, 1978
- Keeper of the Flame, by Nina Simone, 1967
- Keeper of the Flame, by Caroline Henderson, 2009
- Keeper of the Flame, by Delbert McClinton, 1979
- Keeper of the Flame, by Luka Bloom, 2000
- Keepers of the Flame, by the Charles Earland Tribute Band, including Eric Alexander, 2002
- Keepers of the Flame, by JGB, 2006
- Keepers of the Flame, by Phoenyx, a band co-founded by Alexander James Adams, 1990

=== Songs ===
- "Keeper of the Flame" (song), by Martin Page, 1995
- "Keeper of the Flame", by A-ha from Analogue, 2005
- "Keeper of the Flame", by Miranda Lambert from The Weight of These Wings, 2016
- "Keepers of the Flame", by Kevin Kern from Imagination's Light, 2005

== Other uses ==
- Keepers of the Flame: Understanding Amnesty International, a 2006 book by Stephen Hopgood
- Keepers of the Flame Fraternity, an organization within the Church Universal and Triumphant
- Flamekeepers, the title for the volunteers of the 2015 European Games

== See also ==
- Strážce plamene (lit. The Flamekeeper), a 2006 album by Petr Hapka and Michal Horáček
