= Baring, Saskatchewan =

Community in Saskatchewan, Canada

Coordinates: 50°15′04″N 103°03′40″W

Location of Baring in Saskatchewan

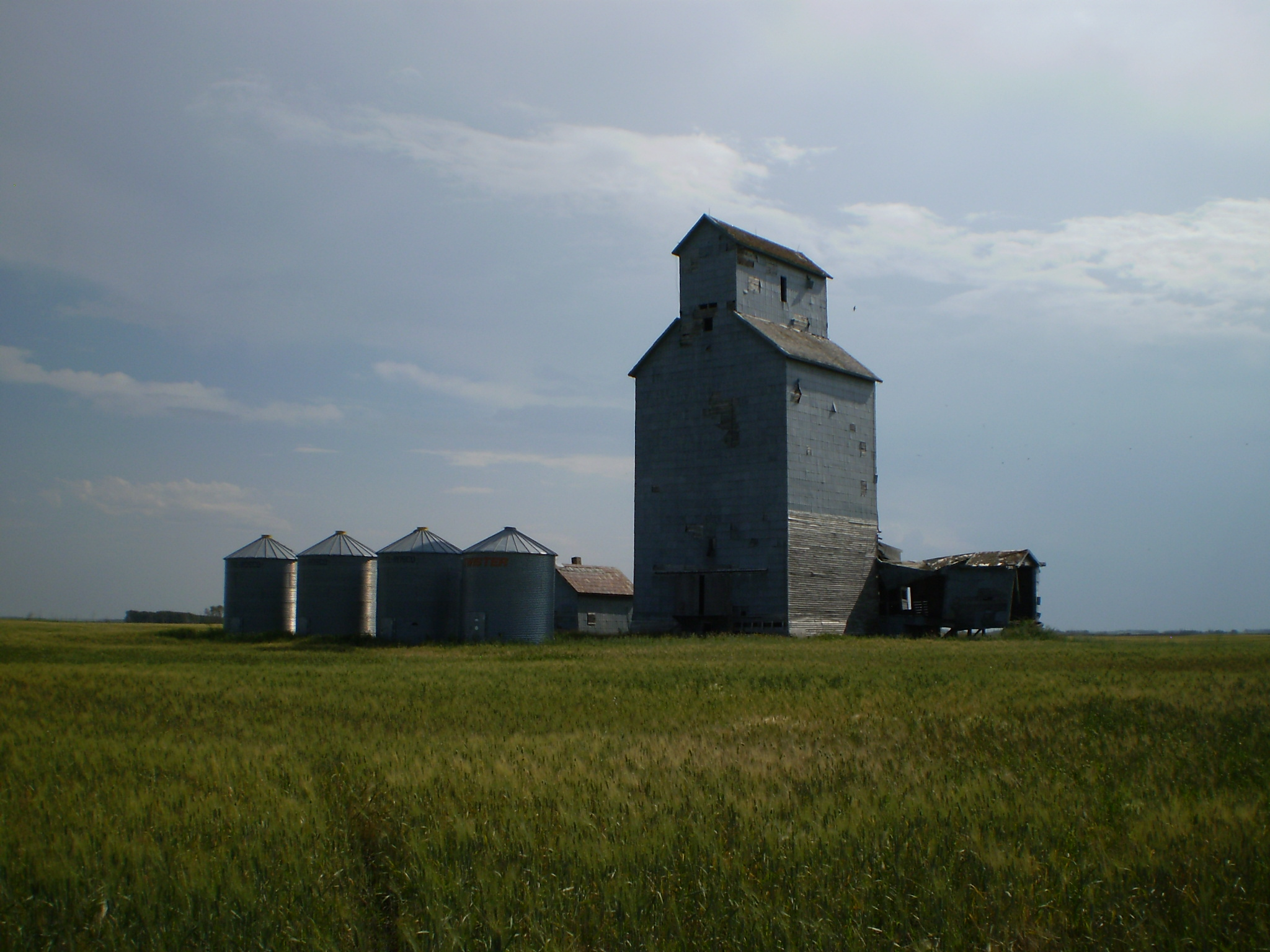
Baring Elevator August 2010

Baring is an unincorporated community in Saskatchewan. It is south-east of Grenfell, just off Highway 47.

== See also ==
- List of communities in Saskatchewan
