= Lewis Harcourt, 1st Viscount Harcourt =

British politician (1863–1922)

The Right Honourable The Viscount Harcourt PC
- Lewis Harcourt MP

First Commissioner of Works
- In office 10 December 1905 – 3 November 1910
- Monarchs: Edward VII; George V
- Prime Minister: Sir Henry Campbell-Bannerman; H. H. Asquith
- Preceded by: The Lord Windsor
- Succeeded by: The Earl Beauchamp
- In office 25 May 1915 – 10 December 1916
- Monarch: George V
- Prime Minister: H. H. Asquith
- Preceded by: The Lord Emmott
- Succeeded by: Sir Alfred Mond, Bt

Secretary of State for the Colonies
- In office 3 November 1910 – 25 May 1915
- Monarch: George V
- Prime Minister: H. H. Asquith
- Preceded by: The Earl of Crewe
- Succeeded by: Bonar Law

Personal details
- Born: 31 January 1863 Nuneham Courtenay, Oxfordshire
- Died: 24 February 1922 (aged 59) Brook Street, London
- Party: Liberal
- Spouse: Mary Ethel Burns (m. 1899)
- Children: 4, including Doris Harcourt and William Harcourt

Lewis Vernon Harcourt, 1st Viscount Harcourt PC (born Reginald Vernon Harcourt; 31 January 1863 – 24 February 1922), was a British Liberal Party politician who held the Cabinet post of Secretary of State for the Colonies from 1910 to 1915. Harcourt's nickname was "Loulou".

== Early life and education ==
Harcourt was born at Nuneham Courtenay, Oxfordshire, the only surviving son of politician Sir William Vernon Harcourt and his first wife, Maria Theresa Lister. He was originally christened with the name Reginald, in honour of his father's university friend Reginald Cholmondeley, but when George Cornewall Lewis died just over two months after, he was rechristened with the name Lewis. He was educated at Eton. He studied Doctor of Civil Law at University of Oxford.

He inherited the lordships of the manors of Stanton Harcourt, Nuneham Courtenay, North Hinksey, Cogges, Northmoor and Shifford in Oxfordshire.

== Political career ==
Harcourt was private secretary to his father, Sir William, as Home Secretary from 1880 to 1885; and again when he was Chancellor of the Exchequer in 1886, and 1892–95. He was Liberal Member of Parliament for Rossendale, Lancashire, from 1904 to 1916 and served as First Commissioner of Works in Sir Henry Campbell-Bannerman's 1905 ministry (appointed to Cabinet in 1907) and to H. H. Asquith's Cabinet between 1908 and 1910 and again between 1915 and 1916. In this role he authorised the placement in Kensington Gardens of the Peter Pan statue, sculpted by George Frampton, erected on 1 May 1912, and the plans for the rebuilding of Piccadilly Circus in 1915 (eventually executed in 1923).

Between 1910 and 1915, he was Secretary of State for the Colonies under Asquith. In 1911 his home in Berkeley Square had windows smashed by suffragettes, including Ada Wright who were imprisoned for two weeks. Harcourt was raised to the peerage as Viscount Harcourt, of Stanton Harcourt in the County of Oxford, in 1917.

During the debate over Chancellor David Lloyd George's proposed "People's Budget" Harcourt was amongst its foremost critics, with Malcolm Thomson, Lloyd George's official biographer, writing that he was "the most inveterate in obstructing his proposals, while posing all the time as an ardent Radical".

During his time in politics, Harcourt supported numerous progressive measures such as those related to land reform, social security and minimum wage provisions.

== Public appointments and other interests ==
Harcourt acted as a Trustee of the British Museum, Wallace Collection, the London Museum, and the National Portrait Gallery, which has a portrait of him.

Harcourt was interested in natural history and sought to protect birds, fish and other creatures from extinction. He received an Honorary DCL from Oxford University and was also an honorary fellow of the Royal Institute of British Architects.

== Port Harcourt ==
Port Harcourt, capital of Rivers State in southern Nigeria, is named after him. When the port was established in 1912, there was much controversy about the name it should receive. In August 1913, the Governor-General of Nigeria, Sir Frederick Lugard wrote to Harcourt, then Secretary of State for the Colonies, that "in the absence of any convenient local name, I would respectfully ask your permission to call this Port Harcourt". The Secretary of State replied, "It gives me pleasure to accede to your suggestion that my name should be associated with the new Port".

== Queen Victoria ==
Harcourt's diaries contain a report that one of Queen Victoria's chaplains, Revd Norman Macleod, made a deathbed confession repenting of his action in presiding over Queen Victoria's marriage to her servant, John Brown.

== Marriage and children ==
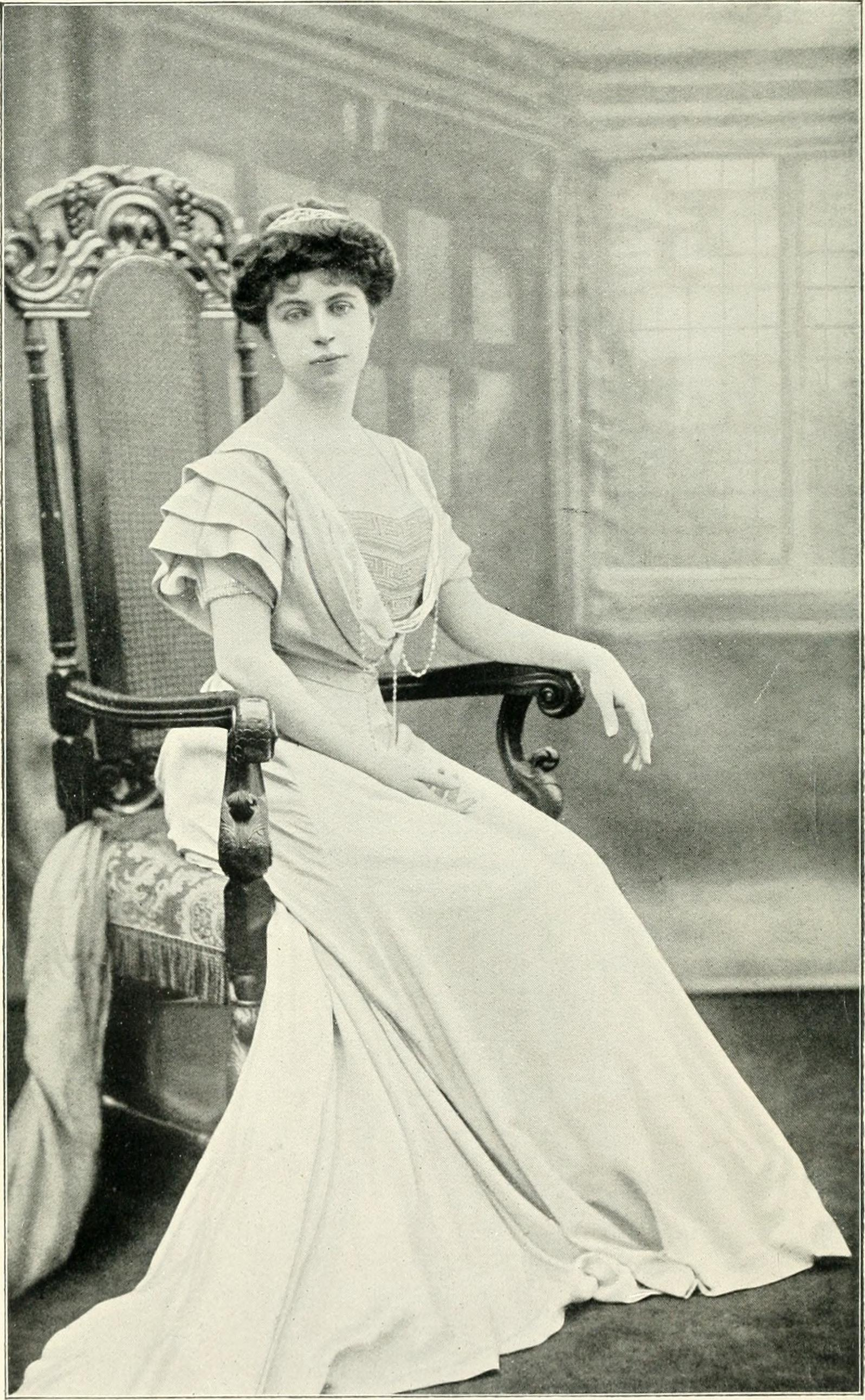
Mary Ethel Harcourt, circa 1911

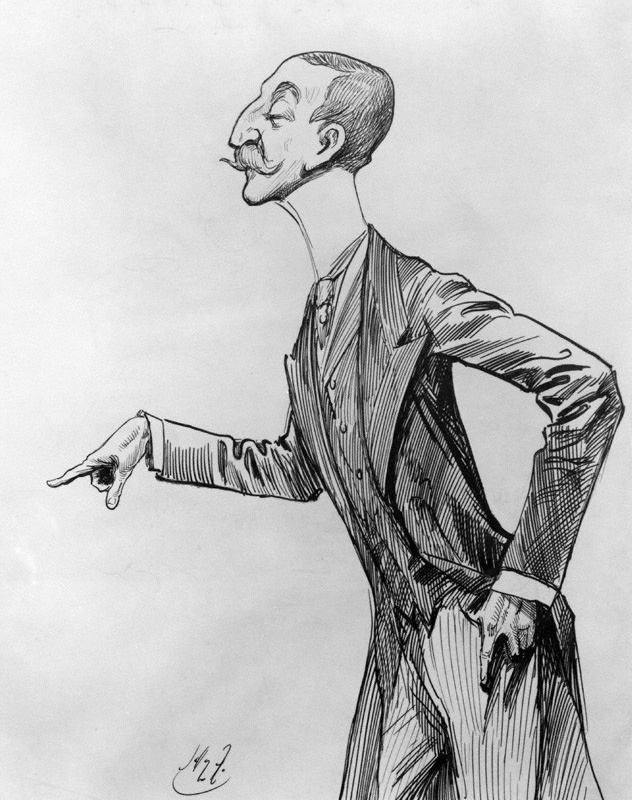
Lord Harcourt by Harry Furniss

Harcourt coat of arms: Gules, two Fesses Or

On 1 July 1899, Harcourt married Mary Ethel Burns, daughter of American banker Walter Hayes Burns and his wife, Mary Lyman (née Morgan), a sister of J. P. Morgan. Through her, the family acquired the famous "Harcourt emeralds".

Mary, Viscountess Harcourt, was appointed a Lady of Grace of the Order of St John and then Dame Grand Cross of the Order of the British Empire (GBE) in 1918; she died 7 January 1961.

Lord and Lady Harcourt had four children:

- Hon. Doris Mary Thérèse Harcourt (30 March 1900 – 9 May 1981); married Alexander Baring, 6th Baron Ashburton: their elder son John succeeded as 7th Baron Ashburton.
- Hon. Olivia Vernon Harcourt DCVO (5 April 1902 – 2 August 1984); married The Hon. (Godfrey) John Mulholland, younger son of 2nd Baron Dunleath (died 1948); with 1 son and 2 daughters. She served as Woman of the Bedchamber to HM Queen Elizabeth the Queen Mother 1951–1961.
- Hon. Barbara Vernon Harcourt OBE (28 April 1905 – 19 May 1961); married Robert Jenkinson (1900–1970), a great-great grandson of Col. John Jenkinson, brother of the 1st Earl of Liverpool, in 1927 (later divorced); with 1 son and 2 daughters. She remarried, in 1937, William James Baird (9 November 1893 – 2 February 1961). She died by a self-inflicted gunshot wound a few months after her husband's death.
- William Edward Harcourt, 2nd Viscount Harcourt KCMG OBE (5 October 1908 – 3 January 1979), succeeded as Viscount Harcourt at age 13.

== Sexual misconduct ==
Harcourt was known in London society as a sexual predator of the young of both genders. He attempted to sexually assault Dorothy Brett, the daughter of Viscount Esher (allegedly a fellow paedophile), when she was about 15. Brett wrote of him that "It is so tiresome that Loulou is such an old roué. He is as bad with boys as with girls... he is simply a sex maniac. It isn't that he is in love. It is just ungovernable sex desire for both sexes".

== Death ==
Harcourt died in his sleep at his London townhouse at 69 Brook Street (now the Savile Club) in the early hours of 24 February 1922, aged 59. He had taken an overdose of a sleeping draught, and there were rumours of suicide following accusations of sexual impropriety by Edward James, a young Etonian who later became an important collector of surrealist and other contemporary art. James's mother spread the story in society, although the accusations remained unknown by the wider public for fifty years. An inquest was held as to the cause of death, which returned a verdict of death by misadventure; the underlying cause being given as heart failure and sudden oedema of the lungs brought on by a dose of Bromidia, which he had been prescribed as a sleep aid. According to the coroner, who found extensive heart disease, the amount of Bromidia he had taken would not have caused death in a healthy person. According to his valet, there was only a very small amount of Bromidia left in the bottle the prior evening, which Harcourt did not take regularly.

His physician, Dr Lindsay Scott, had last seen him on 30 January and testified that Harcourt was not in very good health, being weak and with an irregular heartbeat. He said that he did not expect him to die suddenly, but admitted, "I did not think he would live many years." The coroner dismissed the notion of suicide as "grotesque" given the evidence. Patrick Jackson, Harcourt's biographer in the Oxford Dictionary of National Biography, also noted that suicide seemed unlikely given that Harcourt was in the midst of finishing a biography on his father, Sir William, which he had commissioned from Alfred George Gardiner. Harcourt had spent the evening prior to his death editing a recent draft and had an appointment with Gardiner the following day to discuss the project. Jackson writes, "It seems hard to believe that Harcourt would not have wished to see through to completion an enterprise over which he had exercised tight control, and which recalled for him the glorious days of political partnership with his father."

A memorial service for Lord Harcourt was held on 1 March at St Margaret's, Westminster, with Prebendary of Westminster William Carnegie officiating with the Very Rev. Albert Baillie, Dean of Windsor. Lord Harcourt was buried after a large, well-attended funeral service the same day at the parish church at Nuneham Courtney, conducted by Bishop of Oxford Hubert Burge, Bishop of Birmingham Henry Wakefield, and the rector Rev. Hildebrand Thomas Giles Alington. He was buried in the family vault in the churchyard.

== See also ==
- House of Harcourt

== Sources ==
- Blake, Robert; Nicholls, Christine Stephanie (1986). The Dictionary of National Biography (Ninth Supplement), 1971–1980. Oxford University Press. ISBN 9780198652083.
- Viscount Lewis Harcourt (2006). Loulou: selected extracts from the journals of Lewis Harcourt (1880–1895). Fairleigh Dickinson University Press. ISBN 9780838641033.
- Bloch, Michael. Closet Queens: Some 20th Century British Politicians (Little, Brown, 2015) ISBN 1408704129 Chapter 1: Archie, Regie, Loulou and Bill

Parliament of the United Kingdom
| Preceded by Sir William Mather | Member of Parliament for Rossendale; 1904 – 1917 | Succeeded by Sir John Henry Maden |
Political offices
| Preceded by The Lord Windsor | First Commissioner of Works; 1905–1910 | Succeeded by The Earl Beauchamp |
| Preceded by The Earl of Crewe | Secretary of State for the Colonies; 1910–1915 | Succeeded by Bonar Law |
| Preceded by The Lord Emmott | First Commissioner of Works; 1915–1916 | Succeeded by Sir Alfred Mond, Bt |
Peerage of the United Kingdom
| New creation | Viscount Harcourt; 1917–1922 | Succeeded by William Harcourt |
