= John Baring, 7th Baron Ashburton =

British merchant banker (1928–2020)

The Right Honourable The Lord Ashburton KG KCVO DL
- Born: 2 November 1928
- Died: 6 October 2020 (aged 91)
- Education: Eton College; Trinity College, Oxford
- Spouses: Susan Mary Renwick (m. 1955; div. 1984) Sarah Cornelia Spencer-Churchill (m. 1987)

Member of the House of Lords
- Lord Temporal
- In office 12 June 1991 – 11 November 1999 as a hereditary peer
- Preceded by: The 6th Baron Ashburton
- Succeeded by: Seat abolished (Note: Pursuant to the House of Lords Act 1999.)

9th Chairman of British Petroleum
- In office 1992–1995
- Preceded by: Sir Robert Horton
- Succeeded by: David Simon

John Francis Harcourt Baring, 7th Baron Ashburton (2 November 1928 – 6 October 2020), was a British merchant banker who served as chairman of British Petroleum from 1992 to 1995. Lord Ashburton also sat on the boards of Jaguar Cars, Dunlop Rubber, and Royal Insurance.

== Family ==
He was the oldest son of Alexander Baring, 6th Baron Ashburton, and Doris Harcourt.

His maternal grandparents were Lewis Harcourt, 1st Viscount Harcourt, and Mary Ethel Burns, daughter of Walter Hayes Burns of New York City, granddaughter of Junius Spencer Morgan and niece of American banking magnate J. P. Morgan.

== Marriages and children ==
=== First marriage ===
On 25 November 1955, Baring married Susan Mary Renwick (born 1930). She was a daughter of Robert Renwick, 1st Baron Renwick, and his first wife Dorothy Mary Parkes. They had four children:

- Lucinda Mary Louise "Lucy" Baring (born 20 October 1956). Married Michael John Wilmot Malet Vaughan, second son of John David Malet Vaughan, 8th Earl of Lisburne. They have three children: Emma, Sophie and Edward.
- Mark Francis Robert Baring, 8th Baron Ashburton (born 17 August 1958). Married Miranda Caroline Wright. They have four children: Aurea, Frederick, Patrick and Flora.
- Rose Theresa Baring (born 7 December 1961). Married Barnaby Rogerson. They have two daughters: Molly and Hannah.
- Alexander Nicholas John "Zam" Baring (born 15 February 1964). Married Lucy Caroline Fraser, daughter of General David Fraser and Julia Frances Oldridge de la Hey. They have four children: Olive, William, Anna and Alfred.

Lord Ashburton and his first wife received a divorce in 1984.

=== Second marriage ===
Following his divorce, Lord Ashburton remained single for three years. In 1987, he married Sarah Cornelia Spencer-Churchill (born 1935), a daughter of John George Spencer-Churchill and Angela Mary Culme-Seymour. Her paternal grandparents were John Strange "Jack" Spencer-Churchill and Lady Gwendoline Theresa Mary Bertie. Jack Spencer-Churchill was a son of Lord Randolph Churchill and his wife Jennie Jerome, and a brother of Winston Churchill, Prime Minister of the United Kingdom. The second Lady Ashburton is a director of Borderline, a privately owned textile company.

Lord Ashburton had no children from his second marriage.

== Career ==
Lord Ashburton received his education at Eton College and Trinity College, Oxford.

He served in the board of directors of several companies. The following list may not be complete:

- He was a director of Trafford Park Estates from 1964 to 1977.
- He was a director of Royal Insurance from 1964 to 1982.
- He was a director of Pye Holdings from 1967 to 1979.
- He was chairman of the board of the Barings Bank from 1974 to 1989. The bank had been founded by his ancestor Francis Baring in 1762.
- He was invited several times to the annual meeting of the Bilderberg Group.
- He was a director of Dunlop Holdings from 1981 to 1984.
- He was a director of BP from 1982 to 1992.
- He was a director of the Bank of England from 1983 to 1991.
- He was a director of the Barings public limited company from 1985 to 1989.
- He was chairman of the board of BP from 1992 to 1995.

== Death ==
Lord Ashburton died at his home on 6 October 2020, aged 91. He was succeeded in the barony by his son Mark.

== Honours and arms ==
John Baring was appointed a Commander of the Royal Victorian Order (CVO) in the 1980 Birthday Honours, knighted as Knight Bachelor in the 1983 New Year Honours and promoted to Knight Commander of the Royal Victorian Order (KCVO) in the 1990 New Year Honours. He succeeded to the Ashburton barony on 12 June 1991, and became a Knight Companion of the Garter in 1994 – one of the rare cases where both father and son were appointed to this order.

=== Arms ===
Coat of arms of John Baring, 7th Baron Ashburton
Notes Baron since 1991 Coronet A coronet of a Baron Crest A five rays star Erminois between two wings Argent. Torse Mantling Or and Azure. Escutcheon Azure a fess Or charged with a cross patée fitché in chief a head of bear proper and muzzled and gorged Or. Supporters On either side a bear proper muzzled gorged Or, a chain affixed thereto passing between the forelegs and reflexed over the back also Or, the bear charged on the shoulder with a cross patée fitchée also Or. Motto VIRTUS IN ARDUIS; Latin: Fortitude under difficulties Orders The Order of the Garter circlet. Banner The banner of the Baron Ashburton's arms used as Knight Companion of the Garter depicted at St George's Chapel.

== Notes ==
Court offices
Preceded by Nicholas Henderson	Lord Warden of the Stannaries; 1990–1994	Succeeded by The Earl Peel
Peerage of the United Kingdom
Preceded by Alexander Baring	Baron Ashburton; 2nd creation 1991–2020; Member of the House of Lords (1991–1999)	Succeeded by Mark Baring
