= Behring =

Behring may refer to:

== People ==
- Alex Behring, Brazilian businessman
- B. D. Behring (1946–2025), Indian politician
- Ehler Behring (1865–1918), German rear admiral
- Emil von Behring (1854–1917), German physiologist, Nobel Prize recipient
- John Behring, American cinematographer, television director and producer
- Ken Behring, American real-estate developer, owner of the Seattle Seahawks football team, and philanthropist
- Vitus Bering, Danish-born Russian explorer
- Anders Behring Breivik, Norwegian terrorist

== Locations ==
- Bering Strait, sometimes spelled "Behring"
- Behring Sea, archaic spelling of Bering Sea

== Other ==
- 65685 Behring, a main-belt asteroid
- CSL Behring, American plasma protein biotherapeutics company
- Dade Behring, an American company which manufactured testing machinery and supplies for the medical diagnostics industry
