= Junius Spencer Morgan =

American banker and financier (1813–1890)

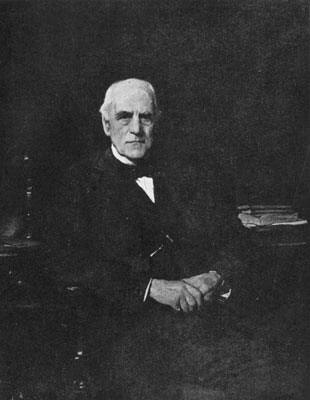
- Born: April 14, 1813; Holyoke, Massachusetts, U.S.
- Died: April 8, 1890 (aged 76); Monte Carlo, Monaco
- Resting place: Cedar Hill Cemetery, Hartford, Connecticut
- Occupations: Financier, banker
- Known for: founding J.S. Morgan & Co. (i.e. predecessor firm of J.P. Morgan & Co. and Morgan Grenfell)
- Spouse: Juliet Pierpont (m. 1836; died 1884)
- Children: John Pierpont; Sarah Spencer; Mary Lyman; Junius Spencer Jr. Juliet Pierpont
- Parent: Joseph Morgan
- Relatives: Morgan family

Junius Spencer Morgan I (April 14, 1813 – April 8, 1890) was an American banker and financier, as well as the father of J. P. Morgan and patriarch to the Morgan banking house.

In 1864, he established J. S. Morgan & Co. in London as the successor to George Peabody & Co., of which he was junior partner. With his son's aid, Morgan grew his banking house into a trans-Atlantic financial empire that included firms in London, New York City, Philadelphia, and Paris. By the time of his death in 1890, the Morgan banks were dominant forces in government and railroad finance, and his was the pre-eminent American banking house.

== Early life ==
Morgan was born on April 14, 1813, in Holyoke, Massachusetts to Joseph Morgan Jr. and Sarah "Sally" Spencer Morgan.

At the age of 13, he was enrolled at the American Literary, Scientific, and Military Academy (now Norwich University) in Middletown, Connecticut near the home of his mother's parents. After a year, he transferred to a private academy in East Windsor, Connecticut and spent summers working on his father's farm or assisting at his father's business office in Hartford.

As was typical for aspiring businessmen of the time, Junius did not enroll in college, but was apprenticed to Alfred Welles, a Boston merchant banker, in 1829. He remained as a clerk for five years, gaining exposure to the banking industry, as well as a number of mercantile trades in Boston and New York.

=== Family ===
The Morgan name is traced to Carmarthen, Wales, with his earliest known ancestor being Hyfaidd ap Bleddri, third son of Bledri ap Cydifor of Wales. Miles Morgan, ancestor to the Morgan family in America, emigrated from Bristol, England to Boston in 1636.

Junius's father Joseph was a farmer in West Springfield, Massachusetts. He entered business in Connecticut, operating a tavern, coffee house, and stagecoach line, and was a founding partner in the Aetna Fire Insurance Company in 1819. He made a fortune with Aetna in 1835, when Aetna covered Wall Street firms destroyed in the Great Fire of New York. Joseph personally bought the stakes of Aetna investors who hesitated to pay on the policies. These prompt payments to the banks destroyed in the fire established Aetna's reputation on Wall Street and allowed the firm to triple its premiums in later years.

== Early career ==
In April 1829, Alfred Welles offered Morgan a partnership in his firm; he accepted against his father's wishes. Within a year, the business struggled sufficiently that Joseph Morgan had to bail his son out and dissolve the partnership.

Soon thereafter, Morgan's father secured him a new partnership at Morris Ketchum's private bank on Wall Street, renamed Morgan Ketchum & Co. The firm did a general banking and brokerage business and had a few foreign clients.

=== Howe Mather & Co. ===
In January 1836, Morgan's father bought him a partnership in the Hartford wholesale dry goods house of Howe Mather & Co., the largest in Hartford. He remained at the firm until his father's death in 1847.

During the Panic of 1837, Morgan traveled the South in an effort to collect the firm's debts, in specie if possible but often in payments of cotton. He continued traveling to collect debts and purchase cotton through the ongoing depression into the 1840s, continuing to grow his reputation as a businessman in Hartford. In 1845, his father invested an additional $25,000 in the firm on Junius's behalf.

Soon after inheriting a fortune from his father's estate in 1847, Morgan was named senior partner at the rechristened Mather Morgan & Co. In 1850, he took a trip to London to meet with some of that city's leading merchant bankers, in hopes that he might expand his own firm into foreign trade and banking.

=== J. M. Beebe, Morgan & Co. ===
In fall 1850, Morgan arranged to go into business with James M. Beebe of Boston, a young merchant with a growing import business. One of the firm's two junior partners was future Governor of New York and U.S. Vice President Levi P. Morton.

By February 1851, Morgan sold his stake in Howe & Mather for $600,000 and moved to Boston's Pemberton Square. He was soon among the nation's financial elite. The firm gave Morgan access to global markets, exporting and financing cotton and other goods shipped from Boston harbor.

=== Peabody & Co. ===
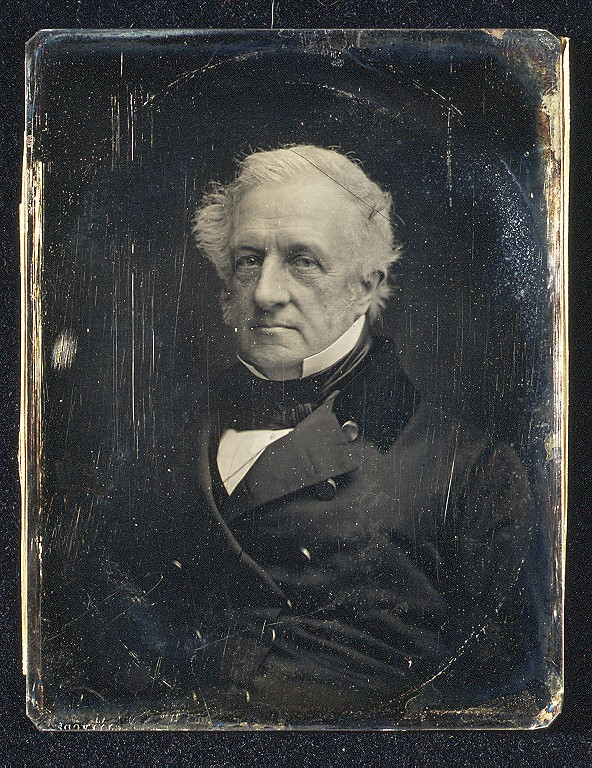
George Peabody, Morgan's senior partner and the founder of the firm that would become J. S. Morgan & Co.

On May 15, 1853, at the recommendation of James Beebe, Morgan visited the American banker George Peabody in London. Peabody, who was in poor health, offered Morgan to join his banking house as a junior partner, to be made the senior partner upon Peabody's retirement in ten years. Peabody pledged the bank could continue to use his name and if necessary, some capital. Morgan demurred but eventually accepted, joining the firm as junior partner in October 1854.

Morgan's initial task was to strengthen and develop the firm's principal American accounts, using his first-hand knowledge of and connections to American business which Peabody, who had moved to London in 1836, lacked. Morgan spent his first few months working for Peabody in the United States, establishing contacts with American clients like Duncan, Sherman & Company, reaching out to new potential clients, and gathering information. During this period, Morgan first met Francis M. Drexel, founder of Drexel & Company, one of Philadelphia's leading banks. Drexel allied his bank with Peabody's through Morgan, forming one of the most powerful and important banking alliances in American history.

Upon Morgan's arrival in London in 1854, Peabody & Co. was immediately in a position of strength as a leading dealer in American securities in the city; American grain, cotton, and railroad values soared during and after the Crimean War. Morgan was placed in charge of much of the firm's iron portfolio, which included the marketing of railroad bonds in both New York and London. The iron business had drawn the firm into greater involvement in financing American railway construction, including as the initial offeror of bonds for the Ohio and Mississippi Rail Road Company in 1853. Built around a core of booming American railway securities, the firm established itself in several other markets, including the New York money market and government finance.

By 1856, Peabody was confident enough in Morgan to leave him in sole care of the business while Peabody took an extended tour of the United States.

==== Panic of 1857 ====
The railway boom ended in 1857 and prices collapsed, leading to rumors in London that Peabody & Co. was on the verge of failure. Some of Peabody's largest clients suspended business or failed entirely, and Duncan Sherman was unable to pay its remittances without assistance. Some of Peabody's own creditors, including rival Barings Bank, demanded immediate payment on their debts.

Peabody declined a conditional bailout from the major London houses which would have closed the firm, instead receiving an emergency line of credit of £800,000 from the Bank of England. After the panic and near collapse of Peabody & Co., Morgan became a more cautious investor, demanding statements from all correspondent banks, even at the risk of offending them and even from well-respected former colleagues.

Despite their own financial difficulties in this period, Peabody and Morgan were chief backers of Cyrus West Field's bedeviled transatlantic cable project throughout. Morgan personally lobbied Washington on Field's behalf in 1856 and Peabody & Co. subscribed to £10,000 of Field's original capital stock of £350,000 and later advanced Field funds to complete the project when he struggled to find American investors. In October 1858, Field's cable broke, delaying the project's completion another eight years until 1866. Throughout, Morgan and Peabody maintained their confidence in Field's project. The firm turned an eventual profit on the venture, but its major purpose was to establish Morgan as a primary backer in the growing communications industry.

==== American Civil War ====
Morgan became the active head of the firm in February 1859, with Peabody remaining the nominal senior partner. He took on a prominent role in London society, hosting many social gatherings at his homes on Hyde Park and at Roehampton.

Though Peabody & Co. made a significant investment in the Transatlantic cotton trade, its principal business was still with correspondent banks in the Eastern United States and with railroad companies. It was therefore not as directly reliant on American slavery as its peer banks in London, and took advantage during the American Civil War by aligning with the Union.

After the Civil War broke out, Morgan traded Union war bonds at a tremendous profit. Working with his son John Pierpont in New York, Morgan was able to receive news of the fall of Vicksburg via telegraph before it became general knowledge in London, buying up Union bonds before their prices rose. Even so, the bank's position in London may have prevented further profits; buying Union war bonds risked alienating the English textile industry, which was closely aligned with Confederate cotton plantations. While Philadelphia banker Jay Cooke and those Wall Street banks with German ties made a bonanza during the war, Peabody & Co. had modest profits by comparison.

== J. S. Morgan & Co. ==
In 1864, Morgan's ten-year agreement with Peabody expired. Though Peabody retired as promised, he denied Morgan the use of his name and capital. Morgan's grandson later recalled this as "at that time, the bitterest disappointment of his life". Peabody also forced unfavorable terms on Morgan's lease of the bank's 22 Old Broad Street offices. Morgan succeeded Peabody as head of the firm and reluctantly changed its name to J. S. Morgan & Co. Despite his disappointment, J. S. Morgan was the largest American bank in London and had earned £444,000 in the prior ten years, leaving Morgan a powerful platform for future investments.

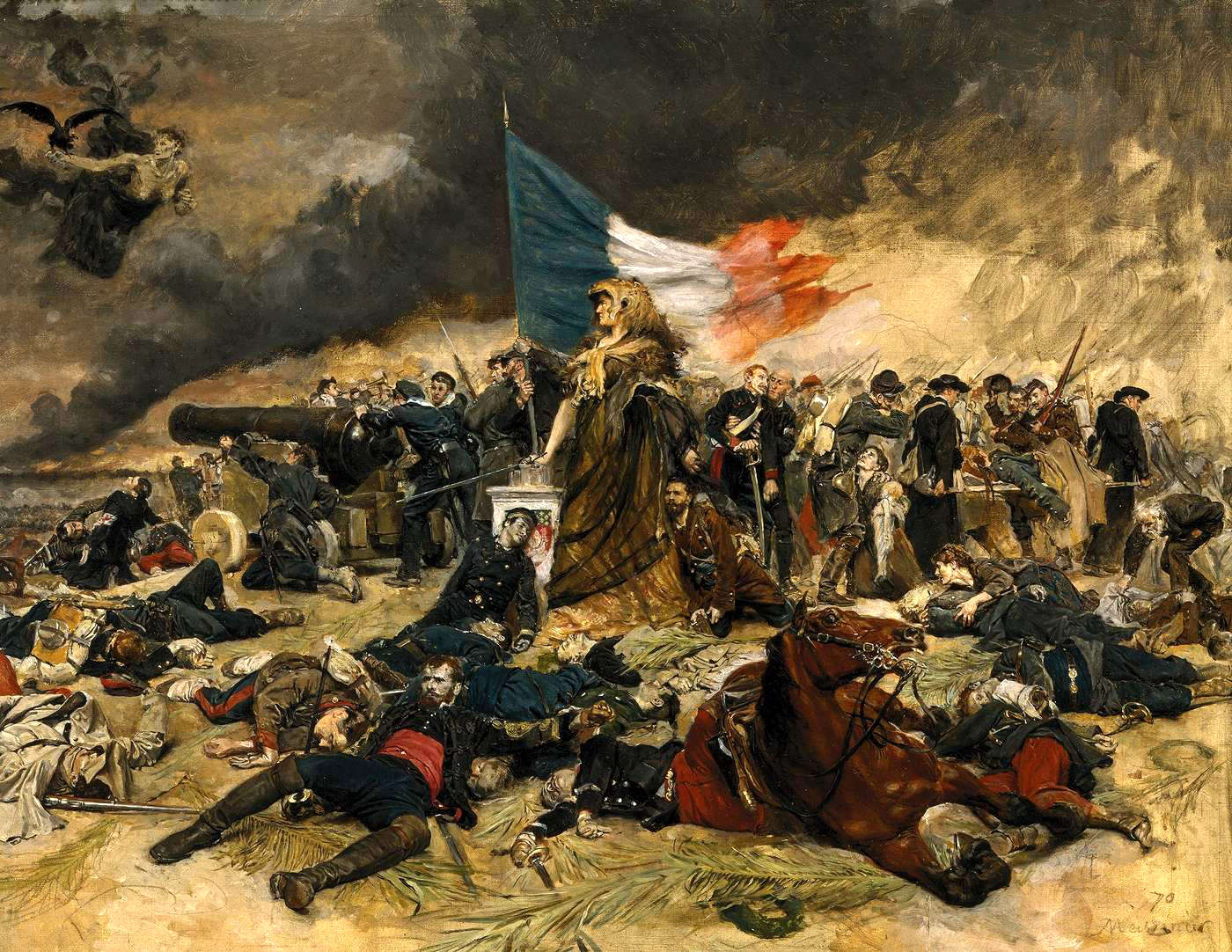
Morgan's decision to finance the French during the losing days of the Franco-Prussian War netted him a profit of £1.5 million.

Still, Morgan was ambitious to place his bank on par with the Rothschilds and Barings Bank. In 1870, after the Battle of Sedan and the establishment of a provisional French Third Republic in Tours, Barings and Rothschilds were unwilling to establish a line of credit for the new government. Morgan led a syndicated bond issue of £10,000,000, which the syndicate sold at 15 points below par. After the fall of Paris in January and the establishment of the Paris Commune, the bonds dropped from 80 points to 55, nearly bankrupting J.S. Morgan & Co. Morgan sought to prop up the price by purchasing as many bonds as he could. The French prepaid the bonds in 1873, following the war, which brought their value up to par and netted Morgan £1,500,000 profit, which propelled J.S. Morgan & Co. into the upper ranks of international finance.

Another windfall arrived at Morgan's doorstep that same year when Philadelphia's Anthony Drexel proposed an affiliation with J. S. Morgan & Co. Drexel was then Philadelphia's second power in government finance after Jay Cooke. This proposal was accepted and Drexel, Morgan, & Co. became the new New York affiliate of the London bank, with Pierpont as Drexel's junior partner. Pierpont also joined Drexel's Philadelphia firm and his Paris firm, giving the Morgans footholds in four cities.

Morgan was now the wealthiest American banker in London and moved into a Knightsbridge mansion facing the south side of Hyde Park. He also purchased Dover House in Roehampton.

In 1873, Morgan's American presence dramatically increased after the failure of Jay Cooke's banking empire. When American grain (and consequently rail) prices fell dramatically after the resolution of the Franco-Prussian War, Cooke's heavy investment in the Northern Pacific Railway was no longer sufficient to meet liabilities. Railroad securities were further weakened by the Credit Mobilier scandal. Cooke's firm collapsed on September 18, triggering a wave of bank failures as part of the Panic of 1873. Despite the conditions, Pierpont turned the firm a profit of over $1,000,000, leaving Drexel Morgan at the apex of American government finance.

=== Reduced role ===
In 1877, Morgan began a semiretirement, cutting back on his schedule and ceding greater authority to his son. On November 8, a dinner was hosted in his honor at Delmonico's, with Samuel Tilden, John Jacob Astor, and Theodore Roosevelt Sr. among the guests. At the dinner, Morgan stated:

...never do anything to cause evil to be spoken of the American name.

As Junius took a less active role and Pierpont continued to accrue massive profits, the balance of power within the Morgan empire shifted from London to New York City. By the 1880s, Junius's health began to fade, and he stepped back from day-to-day business. After the death of his wife Juliet in 1884, he withdrew further from business. He spent winters at the Villa Henriette in Monte Carlo.

== Personal life ==
=== Appearance and demeanor ===
Morgan was "tall with sloping shoulders" and a thickening midriff, a wide face, light blue eyes, a prominent nose, and a firm mouth.

Morgan was, like his son, intensely private. He had a "dry wit and genial manner and employed iron discipline." He was generally emotionless, and his friend George Smalley praised his "grave, strong beauty" and his "eyes full of light" but a face that ended in an "immovable jaw."

=== Family ===
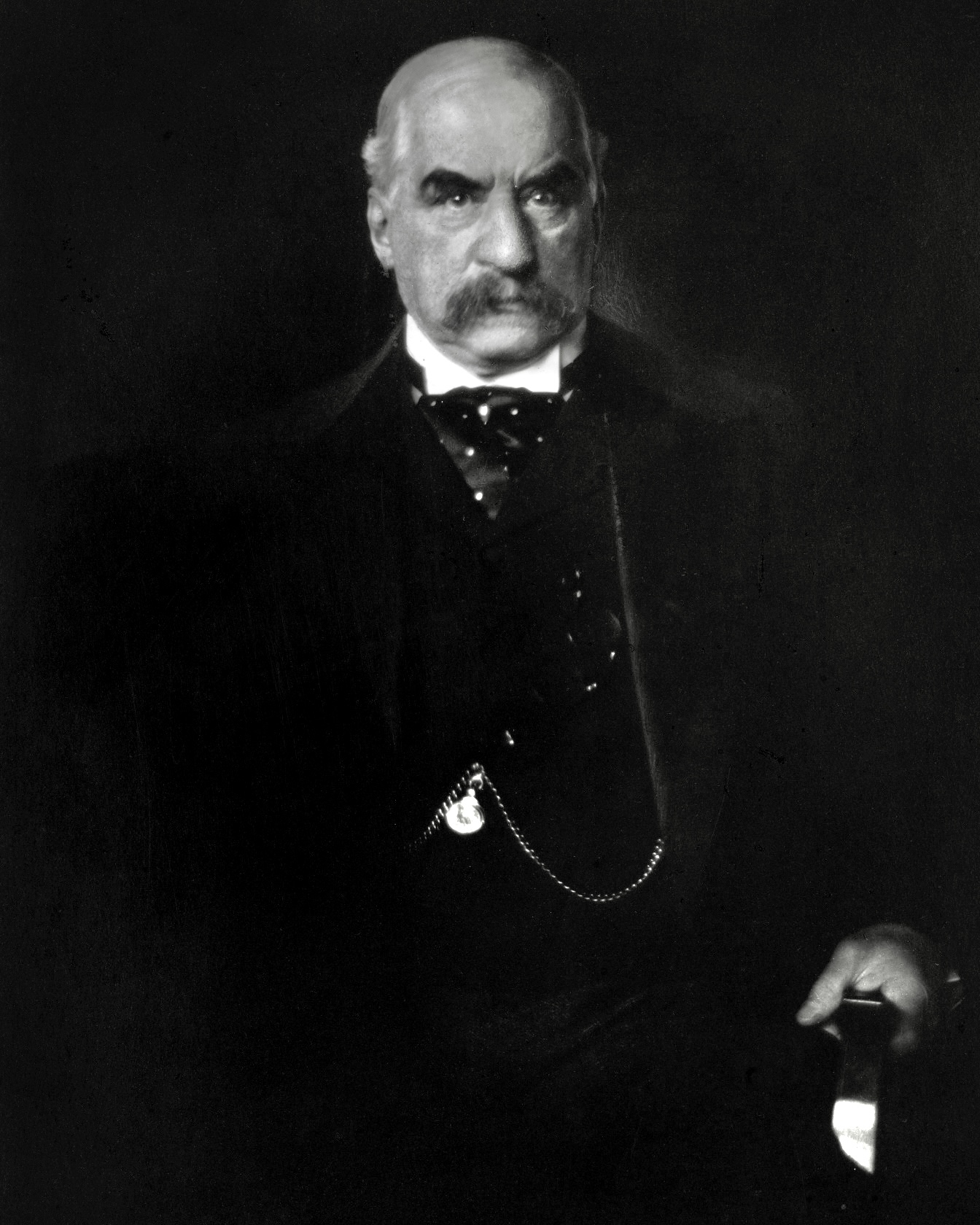
Morgan's eldest son, J. P. Morgan, photographed by Steichen in 1903

In 1836, Morgan married Juliet Pierpont (1816–1884), daughter of John Pierpont (1785–1866), a poet, lawyer, merchant, and Unitarian minister. Together, they had:

- John Pierpont Morgan (1837–1913), who married Amelia Sturges (1835–1862), and later, Frances Louise Tracy (1842–1924)
- Sarah Spencer Morgan (1839–1896), who married George Hale Morgan (1840–1911)
- Mary Lyman Morgan (1844–1919), who married Walter Hayes Burns (1838–1897). Their daughter, Mary Ethel Burns (d. 1961) married Lewis Harcourt, 1st Viscount Harcourt (1863–1922) in 1899.
- Junius Spencer Morgan Jr (1846–1850), who died young
- Juliet Pierpont Morgan (1847–1923), who was the mother of John Junius Morgan (d. 1952).

Morgan poured tremendous effort into his son and heir J. Pierpont. After Junius's move to London, Pierpont was his father's primary source of intelligence on American conditions. Their relationship, though separated by an ocean and wildly divergent personalities, was close. Each fall, Junius made an annual trip to the United States for three months, and Pierpont traveled to London each spring. They maintained a twice-weekly correspondence for thirty-one years, which Pierpont burned in 1911.

His sister, Lucy Morgan (d. 1890) was married to Major James Goodwin, one of the founders, and a president for many years, of the Connecticut Mutual Life Insurance Company. Lucy was the mother of James J. Goodwin and the Rev. Francis Goodwin, chairman of the Hartford Parks Commission.

He was not related to Edwin D. Morgan, a prominent Hartford and New York banker and merchant of the same era who became Governor of New York.

He contributed money to the Hartford Free Library, his church and to Trinity College, Hartford.

=== Politics ===
Like his father, Morgan was a strong supporter of the Whig Party. Morgan was a close friend of the Whig politician and diplomat Abbott Lawrence.

In February 1842, his father-in-law John Pierpont was suggested as a leading candidate for the Liberty Party nomination for Governor of Massachusetts. Morgan urged Pierpont to withdraw his name from consideration, and he did.

=== Religion ===
Though married in his father-in-law's Unitarian church, Morgan attended his own father's Episcopal church in Hartford.

== Death and burial ==
On April 3, 1890, Morgan took an afternoon carriage ride through Monte Carlo. When his horses bolted at an oncoming train, Morgan stood to see if his driver could steady the horses. The carriage hit a pile of stone and Morgan was thrown against the wall. He suffered a broken wrist and concussion and was unconscious for five days until his death on April 8, 1890.

At his funeral, the pallbearers were Roland Mather, Levi P. Morton, Anthony Joseph Drexel, Chauncey M. Depew, Cornelius Vanderbilt II, J. C. Rogers, J. Kearney Warren, and Edward John Phelps. He was interred at the family lot in Cedar Hill Cemetery in Hartford. At the Connecticut State Capitol, flags were flown at half-mast in mourning.

At his death, he left a fortune of $12,400,000 (equivalent to $440,000,000 today).

== In popular culture ==
- A portrayal of Morgan is featured in the History Channel's 2012 miniseries docudrama The Men Who Built America.

== See also ==
- Morgan family
- J.S. Morgan & Co.
