= Preacher's Kid (EP) =

EP by Semler
- Genre: Christian

Preacher's Kid is a 2021 extended play released by Semler that focuses on being a queer Christian. In February 2021, it was the top Christian album on the iTunes charts.

== Background ==
Before they recorded Preacher's Kid, Semler made a documentary about the Christian music industry. In an interview with a recording executive, they asked about including queer Christian artists, but they were told that the subject doesn't come up. In an interview with Michel Martin of NPR, they said that they chose to categorize the album as a Christian album because "I have a lived Christian experience. My faith is deeply important to me. And there's a pluralism of beliefs within Christianity, within that umbrella. And we know that to be true. But yet, within the genre of music, of Christian music, it's just so homogenous."

Semler recorded the album using their laptop and a USB microphone.

== Track listing ==
All tracks are written by Grace Semler Baldridge.

No.	Title	Length
1.	"Bethlehem"	4:07
2.	"Jesus from Texas"	3:18
3.	"Queer Content for your Consideration from Ariane"	0:10
4.	"Chicken"	3:20
5.	"Youth Group"	2:23
6.	"Posture (Interlude)"	0:54
7.	"A Good Man"	4:26
8.	"A Promised Land (Outro)"	1:17
Total length:		19:58
