= Baron Ashburton =

Barony in the Peerage of Great Britain

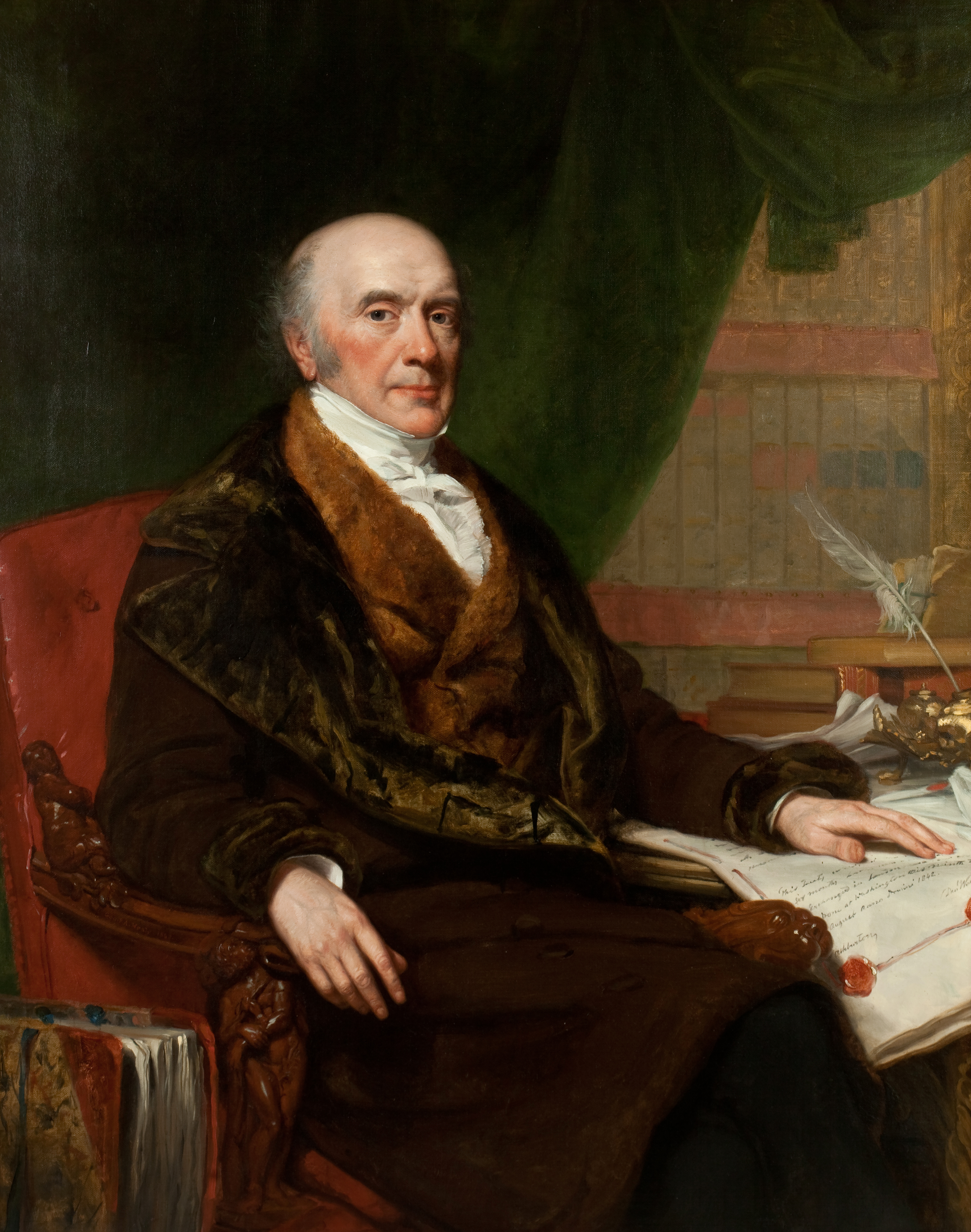
Alexander Baring, 1st Baron Ashburton

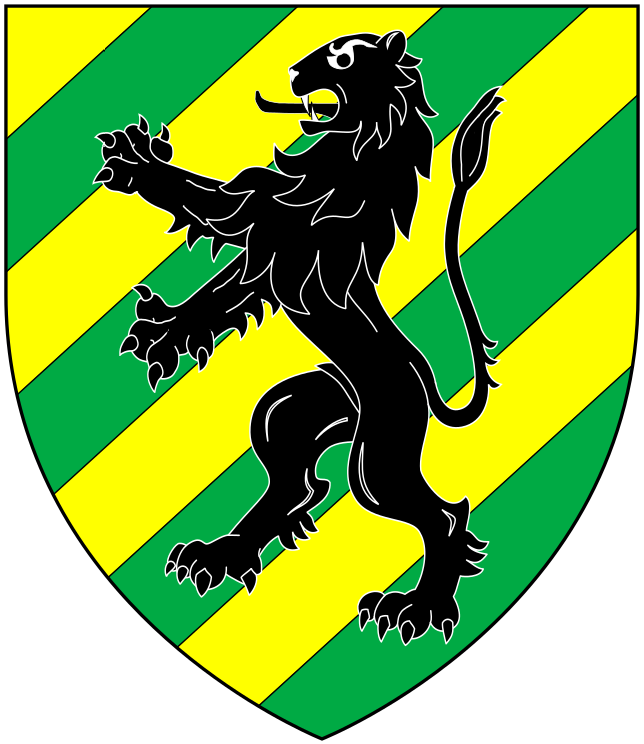
Arms of Dunning, Baron Ashburton: Bendy sinister of eight or and vert, overall a lion rampant sable.

Baron Ashburton, of Ashburton in the County of Devon, is a title that has been created twice, once in the Peerage of Great Britain and once in the Peerage of the United Kingdom. Since 1835, the title has been held by members of the Baring family.

== History ==
The first creation came in the Peerage of Great Britain 1782 in favour of the barrister and Whig politician Sir John Dunning. This creation became extinct in 1823 on the death of his son Richard, the second Baron.

The title was revived in the Peerage of the United Kingdom in 1835 for the financier and Tory politician Alexander Baring. He was the first cousin of the last holder of the 1782 creation. A member of the distinguished Baring family, Lord Ashburton was the second son of Sir Francis Baring, 1st Baronet, the uncle of Francis Baring, 1st Baron Northbrook, Evelyn Baring, 1st Earl of Cromer, and Edward Baring, 1st Baron Revelstoke, and the great-uncle of Thomas Baring, 1st Earl of Northbrook, and Evelyn Baring, 1st Baron Howick of Glendale.

Lord Ashburton was succeeded by his eldest son, the second Baron. He held office in the second Tory administration of Sir Robert Peel. His younger brother, the third Baron, represented Thetford in the House of Commons. The town of Ashburton, New Zealand, is named after him. He was succeeded by his eldest son, the fourth Baron, who also sat as Member of Parliament for Thetford. His son, Francis Baring, succeeded as the fifth Baron in 1889. The fifth Baron was married twice; his second wife, Frances Donnelley, having been one of Broadway's celebrated Florodora sextet in New York. His only son, Alexander Baring, the sixth Baron, was a member of the Hampshire County Council and Lord Lieutenant of Hampshire.

As of 2020, the title is held by the latter's grandson, the eighth Baron. His father, the seventh Baron, was a prominent businessman. As a descendant of Sir Francis Baring, 1st Baronet, the eighth Baron is also in remainder to that title, which is now held by his kinsman, the Lord Northbrook.

Both the 6th and the 7th Barons were appointed Knights of the Garter.

The Hon. Guy Baring, younger son of the fourth Baron, was a soldier and Conservative politician. His son Giles Baring was a successful cricketer.

The family seat is The Grange, near Northington, Hampshire.

== Barons Ashburton, first creation (1782) ==
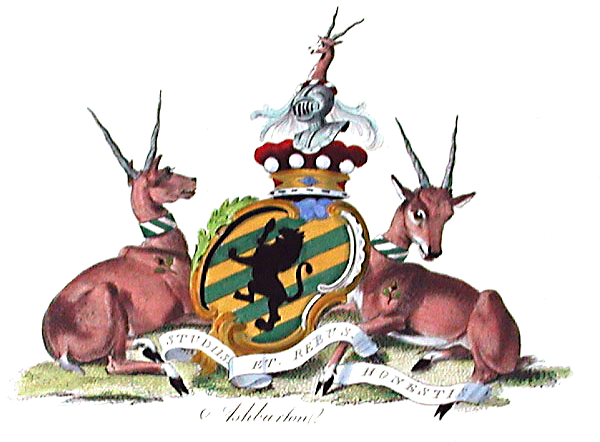
Heraldic achievement of Dunning, Barons Ashburton: Bendy sinister of eight or and vert, overall a lion rampant sable.

- John Dunning, 1st Baron Ashburton (1731–1783)
  - Hon. John Dunning (1781–1783)
- Richard Barré Dunning, 2nd Baron Ashburton (1782–1823)

=== Coat of arms ===
- Arms: Bendy sinister of eight or and vert, overall a lion rampant sable.
- Crest: On a wreath, an antelope's head couped proper, attired, or.
- Supporters: Two antelopes proper, attired, hoofed, and charged on the breast with an acorn slipped proper, and gorged with collars, bendy of eight, or and vert.
- Motto: Studiis et rebus honestis ("for studies and other honest pursuits")

== Barons Ashburton, second creation (1835) ==
Heraldic achievement of Baring, as borne by John Baring, 7th Baron Ashburton (second creation), as a Knight of the Garter: Azure, on a fess or a cross pattée fitchée of the first in chief a bear's head couped proper muzzled and gorged of the second. The Baring arms otherwise have no charge on the fess.

- Alexander Baring, 1st Baron Ashburton (1774–1848)
- (William) Bingham Baring, 2nd Baron Ashburton (1799–1864)
- Francis Baring, 3rd Baron Ashburton (1800–1868)
- Alexander Hugh Baring, 4th Baron Ashburton (1835–1889)
- Francis Denzil Edward Baring, 5th Baron Ashburton (1866–1938)
- Alexander Francis St Vincent Baring, 6th Baron Ashburton (1898–1991)
- John Francis Harcourt Baring, 7th Baron Ashburton (1928–2020)
- Mark Francis Robert Baring, 8th Baron Ashburton (b. 1958)

The heir apparent is the present holder's son, the Hon. Frederick Charles Francis Baring (born 1990).

=== Coat of arms ===
- Arms: Azure, on a fess or a cross pattée fitchée of the first in chief a bear's head couped proper muzzled and gorged of the second.
- Crest: A five rays star Erminois between two wings Argent.
- Supporters: On either side a bear proper muzzled gorged Or, a chain affixed thereto passing between the forelegs and reflexed over the back also Or, the bear charged on the shoulder with a cross patée fitchée also Or.
- Motto: Virtus in arduis ("fortitude under difficulties")

== Title succession chart ==
Title succession chart, Barons Ashburton (both creations).

Johann (John) Baring; 1697–1748
Baring baronetcy (1793, GB)	Baron Ashburton (first creation, 1782)
Sir Francis Baring; 1st Baronet; 1740–1810	John Dunning; 1st Baron Ashburton; 1731–1783	Elizabeth Dunning; Baroness Ashburton (née Baring); 1744–1809
Baron Ashburton (second creation, 1835)
Sir Thomas Baring; 2nd Baronet; 1772–1848	Alexander Baring; 1st Baron Ashburton; 1774–1848	Hon. John Dunning; 1781–1783	Richard Dunning; 2nd Baron Ashburton; 1782–1823
For descendants, see Baron Northbrook.	Barony extinct
Bingham Baring; 2nd Baron Ashburton; 1799–1864	Francis Baring; 3rd Baron Ashburton; 1800–1868
Alexander Baring; 1828–1830	Alexander Baring; 4th Baron Ashburton; 1835–1889
Francis Baring; 5th Baron Ashburton; 1866–1938
Alexander Baring; 6th Baron Ashburton; 1898–1991
John Baring; 7th Baron Ashburton; 1928–2020
Mark Baring; 8th Baron Ashburton born 1958
Hon. Frederick Baring born 1990

Wider family tree

Baring family tree

Johann (John) Baring (1697–1748)
John Baring (1730–1816)	Sir Francis Baring, 1st Baronet (1740–1810)	Charles Baring (1742–1829)
Sir Thomas Baring, 2nd Baronet (1772–1848)	Alexander Baring, 1st Baron Ashburton (1774–1848)	Henry Baring (1777–1848)	William Baring (1779–1820)	William Baring-Gould (1770–1846)
Francis Baring, 1st Baron Northbrook (1796–1866)	Thomas Baring (1799–1873)	Charles Baring (1807–1879)	Bingham Baring, 2nd Baron Ashburton (1799–1864)	Francis Baring, 3rd Baron Ashburton (1800–1868)	Henry Bingham Baring (1804–1869)	Edward Baring, 1st Baron Revelstoke (1828–1897)	Tom Baring (1839–1923)	Evelyn Baring, 1st Earl of Cromer (1841–1917)	William Baring (1819–1906)	Edward Baring-Gould (1804–1872)
Thomas Baring, 1st Earl of Northbrook (1826–1904)	Francis Baring (1850–1915)	T. C. Baring (1831–1891)	Alexander Baring, 4th Baron Ashburton (1835–1889)	Charles Baring (1829–1890)	John Baring, 2nd Baron Revelstoke (1863–1929)	Cecil Baring, 3rd Baron Revelstoke (1864–1934)	Everard Baring (1865–1932)	Maurice Baring (1874–1945)	Rowland Baring, 2nd Earl of Cromer (1877–1953)	Evelyn Baring, 1st Baron Howick of Glendale (1903–1973)	Rosa Baring (1854–1927)	Sabine Baring-Gould (1834–1924)
Francis Baring, 2nd Earl of Northbrook (1850–1929)	Francis Baring, 4th Baron Northbrook (1882–1947)	Francis Baring, 5th Baron Ashburton (1866–1938)	Guy Baring (1873–1916)	Sir Godfrey Baring, 1st Baronet (1871–1957)	Rupert Baring, 4th Baron Revelstoke (1911–1994)	Rowland Baring, 3rd Earl of Cromer (1918–1991)	Charles Baring, 2nd Baron Howick of Glendale (born 1937)	William Baring-Gould (1878–1921)
Earldom extinct
Francis Baring, 5th Baron Northbrook (1915–1990)	Alexander Baring, 6th Baron Ashburton (1898–1991)	Giles Baring (1910–1986)	Sir Charles Baring, 2nd Baronet (1898–1990)	Helen Azalea Baring (1901–1980)	Raymond Baring (1912–1967)	John Baring, 5th Baron Revelstoke (1934–2003)	James Baring, 6th Baron Revelstoke (1938–2012)	Evelyn Baring, 4th Earl of Cromer (born 1946)	William S. Baring-Gould (1913–1967)
Francis Baring, 6th Baron Northbrook (born 1954)	John Baring, 7th Baron Ashburton (1928–2020)	Sir John Baring, 3rd Baronet (born 1947)	Alexander Baring, 7th Baron Revelstoke (born 1970)
Mark Baring, 8th Baron Ashburton (born 1958)

== Line of succession ==
Line of succession (second creation)
- Alexander Baring, 1st Baron Ashburton (1774–1848)
  - (William) Bingham Baring, 2nd Baron Ashburton (1799–1864)
  - Francis Baring, 3rd Baron Ashburton (1800–1868)
    - Alexander Hugh Baring, 4th Baron Ashburton (1835–1889)
      - Francis Denzil Edward Baring, 5th Baron Ashburton (1866–1938)
        - Alexander Francis St. Vincent Baring, 6th Baron Ashburton (1898–1991)
          - John Francis Harcourt Baring, 7th Baron Ashburton (1928–2020)
            - Mark Francis Robert Baring, 8th Baron Ashburton (born 1958)
              - (1) Hon. Frederick Charles Francis Baring (born 1990)
              - (2) Hon. Patrick Robin John Baring (born 1995)
            - (3) Hon. Alexander Nicholas John Baring (born 1964)
              - (4) William Baring
              - (5) Alfred Baring
          - (6) Hon. Robin Alexander Baring (born 1931)
      - Lt Col. Hon. Guy Victor Baring (1873–1916)
        - Simon Alexander Vivian Baring (1905–1962)
          - Julian Guy Alexander Baring (1935–2000)
            - (7) Justin Frank Alexander Baring (born 1971)
              - (8) Julian Angus Alexander Baring (born 2004)
          - (9) Francis Esmond Baring (born 1948)
            - (10) Simon Esmond Charles Baring (born 1983)
        - S/Ldr. Aubrey George Adeane Baring (1912–1987)
          - Alexander Esmond Baring (1953–2004)
            - (11) Adam Alexander Aubrey Baring (born 1988)
        - Lt Col. Esmond Charles Baring (1914–1963)
          - (12) Oliver Alexander Guy Baring (born 1944)
            - (13) Rupert Esmond Ian Baring (born 1968)
              - (14) Sam Baring (born 2005)
            - (15) Esmond Oliver Mark Baring (born 1978)
            - (16) Thomas Edward Joseph Baring (born 1979)
          - (17) Guy Esmond Baring (born 1945)
            - (18) Ben Baring (born 1970)
            - (19) Ned Baring (born 1975)

== See also ==
- Baron Northbrook
- Baron Revelstoke
- Earl of Cromer
- Baron Howick of Glendale
