= Baylham =

Village in Suffolk, England

Coordinates: 52.128233°N 1.081917°E

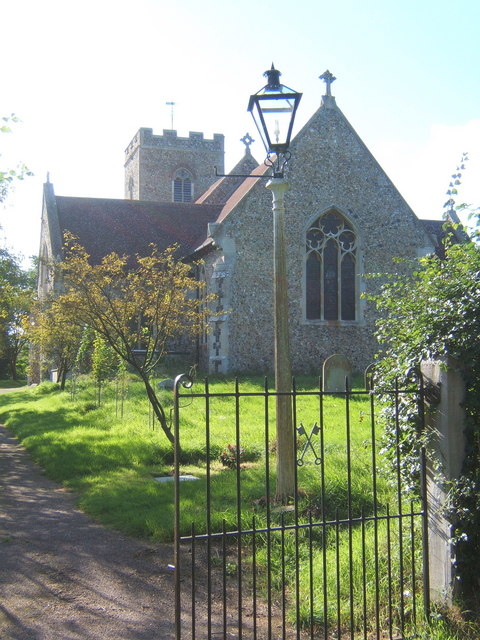
- Baylham Church

- Location within Suffolk
- Interactive map of Baylham
- Population: 300 (2021 census)
- OS grid reference: TM106515
- District: Mid Suffolk
- Shire county: Suffolk
- Region: East
- Country: England
- Sovereign state: United Kingdom
- Post town: Ipswich
- Postcode district: IP6
- Dialling code: 01473

Baylham (/ˈbeɪləm/) is a village and civil parish, 1,349 acres size, in the Mid Suffolk district of Suffolk, England, about 7 miles (11 km) northwest of Ipswich and 6 miles (9.7 km) southeast of Stowmarket.

The buildings making up the village begin either side of the B1113 road, with the majority following Upper Street and northwards along Church Lane, close to the church, to Glebe Close. It is bordered by the parishes of Barking and Darmsden to its West and North, Nettlestead in the South-West, Coddenham to the East and Great Blakenham to the South.

== History ==
=== Prehistory ===
The earliest evidence of habitation in and around Baylham dates back to the Neolithic Age, with a 2007-8 excavation in the parish finding a prehistoric pit from between 9,000 and 4,000BC featuring flint fragments and ditches, suggesting the presence of a barrow cemetery and possible field system.

==== Combretovium ====
The remains of two separate Roman fortifications and a possible small settlement, thought to have existed from the late Iron Age and Claudian eras to the mid 4th century, have been discovered at the end of Mill Lane, east of the Gipping river crossing. Known collectively as Combretovium, the earlier, smaller fort, which covered 5.3 acres, lies within a larger military installation covering 14.5 acres, with other finds occurring across a wider 148-acre area.

While no visible foundations remain, there have been numerous finds throughout the area including a deliberately broken statuette of Nero and a saddle-cloth weight, indicating a sizeable military presence. Combretovium's role as a crossing point at the River Gipping along the Pye Road from London to Caistor St Edmund made it a useful military staging ground, particularly during the Roman defeat of the Iceni. Hut circles, rubbish pits and ditches, along with pottery, kilns and an enclosure dith were found in the south-western quadrant, and 1st century hut circles sealed by 2nd-3rd century debris suggest a settled presence.

=== Middle Ages ===
While records of the post-Roman period are scarce, it's thought incoming Anglo-Saxons settled along the length of the Gipping in the wake of the Roman withdrawal from England, with evidence of cemeteries being found near Coddenham and Hadleigh in the Gipping valley spanning the 5th-8th centuries. In Baylham itself, Anglo-Saxon jewellery dating to the 7th or 8th centuries has been discovered. The river was also certainly navigable and in use as of 800AD, when the Danes traversed it to establish Ratles-Dane, sailing up from the Orwell. The region would have been incorporated into the system of hundreds at this time (initially Bosmere, later Bosmere and Claydon).

The earliest recorded settlement in the post-Roman era has existed at Baylham since at least 1085 and it is listed in the Domesday Book as Beleham (meaning "Fair/Gentle Enclosure" in Old English), in the Hundred of Bosmere, formerly under the control of three overlords prior to the 1066 Norman Conquest. These comprised Thegn Ælfric of Blakenham on behalf of Queen Eadgyth, representatives of the Abbey of Ely, and Brun the Reeve. The book records the village as consisting of 37 households and a half (shared) church, placing it in the largest 20% of settlements at the time, and 20 of these original households consisted of freemen, hosting a mixed pasturage of 130 sheep, 40 pigs and 13 cattle.

Its primary recorded holder following the Conquest was Roger Bigot, a knight loyal to William The Conqueror who was given control of hundreds of locations across Suffolk and Norfolk after the war., as tenant-in-chief over three lords including William de Bourneville, whose holdings were primarily in the hundreds of Bosmere and Cosford, Wulfmer who had held land in Bosmere pre-Conquest, and Warengar of Hedingham who held land throughout the Bosmere hundred.

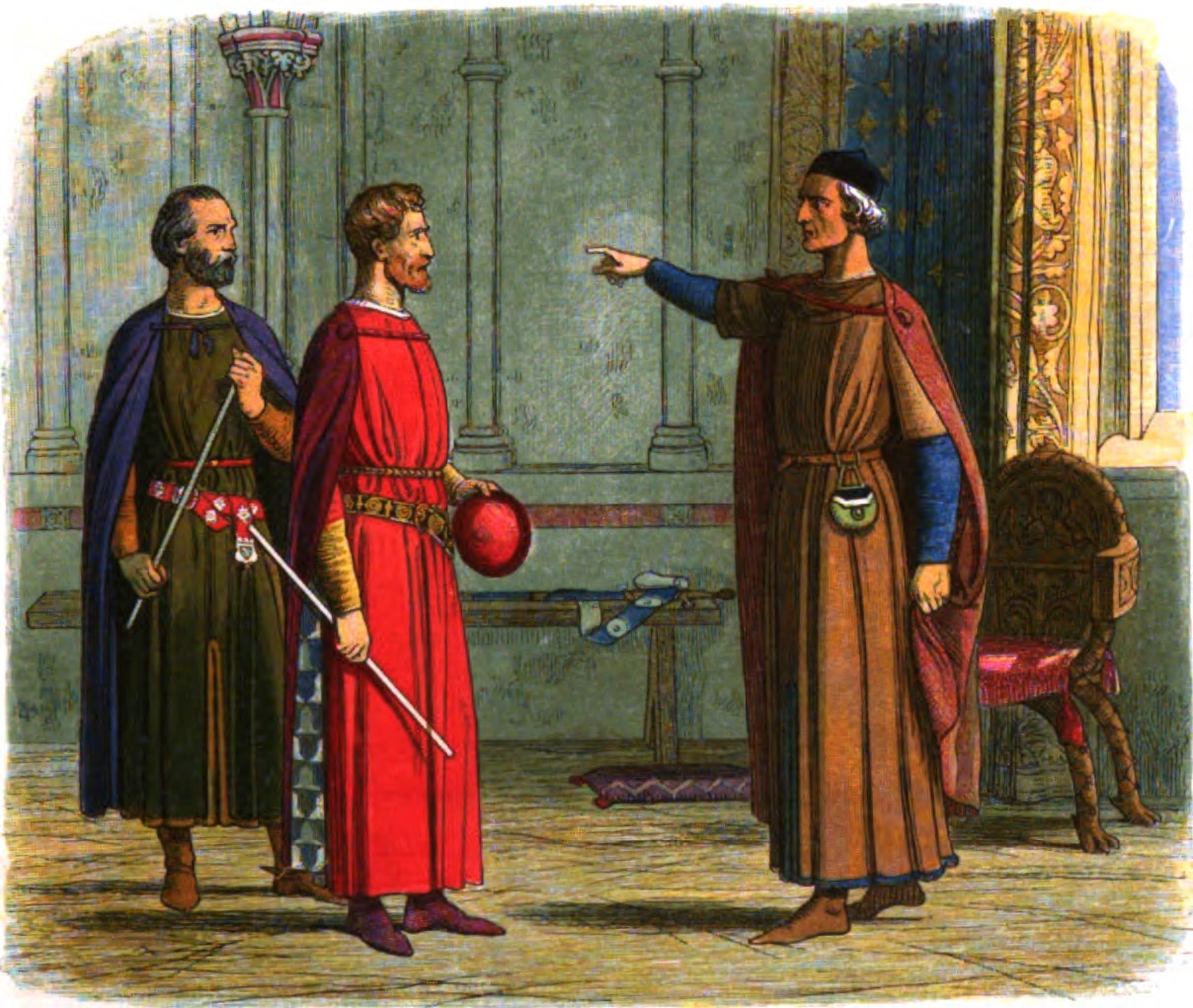
Roger Bigod, 5th Earl of Norfolk famously confronted King Edward over an order to serve against the King of France and was told "By God, Earl, you shall go or you shall hang."

Control of the parish was passed down through the Earldom of Norfolk until Roger Bigod, 5th Earl of Norfolk died childless and his lands were escheated to the crown in 1306, eventually passing to King Edward I's fifth son Thomas. Prominent families from this period include the de Weylands, who were recorded as being "of Baylham" as early as 1200, and the de Bournevilles, with a William de Burnaville holding the manor in the 13th century. A little later the de Cleydons became influential, with John de Cleydon (d. 1333) holding rents in the area.

During the black death Baylham is thought to have fared poorly and, despite being part of a broadly prosperous and growing region following the Conquest, just 20 taxpayers were registered in the 1327, a number that would hold steady until the late 16th century. Also during the 14th-15th centuries, the main body of the church was expanded and established.

Towards the end of the 14th century, Alice Weyland met James Andrew and they married in 1399. The Andrew family, primarily of burgess stock, went on to establish themselves as lower gentry with interests especially in Ipswich, Bramford and Sproughton, with James becoming well known as an executor and trustee, eventually working directly for the Earl of Suffolk in the 1400s and in Henry V's first Parliament in 1413. In 1434 however a dispute over land in Baylham led to James' undoing. He had since 1414 been in a dispute with Richard Sterysacre, a favourite of the Duke of Norfolk, and after being threatened had taken the decision to seek security of the peace (a public oath backed by monetary sum) from Sterysacre and his supporters. The day before the court case was due to begin however he was attacked and killed, forcing his wife and child to seek protection directly from Earl Suffolk. The killing and its aftermath saw intense tensions arise between the Earl and the Duke of Norfolk, with the threat of large-scale violence being so concerning that the King's Council was forced to directly intervene.

James' son, John (d. 1473), also became a firm supporter of the Earl and would sit for Ipswich in Parliament in 1442 and 1449, as well as Bletchingley in 1449. John's own daughter, Elizabeth, would go on to marry first Robert Litton, and then Thomas Windsor.

=== Early Modern ===
Many of Baylham's existing listed buildings first went up through the 15th and 16th centuries, including its Millhouse, Baylham House Farm and White Wheat Farm (see below). The manorial holding was assigned to Thomas Windsor as of 1479 and upon his death in 1485, would have passed to his eldest son Andrew Windsor, 1st Baron Windsor, who died in 1543.

The Windsors would continue to hold the manor until the 17th century, (by which time the village's name had evolved and appears in John Speed's 1610 map as Baleham) when John Acton (d.1661) bought the manor holding from them. Though Acton built Baylham Hall, the village suffered a great deal in the aftermath of the English Civil War, as Acton was thought to have been a royalist sympathiser despite Suffolk broadly being a puritan stronghold and pro-Parliamentary county at the time. Several families in the village were deeply impoverished by fines, and the long-term damage this did was noted as late as 1924 by visitors from the Suffolk Institute. Acton's son (also John, d.1664), married the daughter of a disbarred royalist MP, John Buxton of Norfolk and the Actons would remain influential in the area from the 17th-19th centuries, with their principal seat being at Bramford Hall – noted for having 22 hearths in its 1674 heyday.

Not all of Baylham, however, was implicated during the war. Baylham House Farm (see below) hosted a significant figure in Suffolk's broader puritan fervour in the form of "Smasher" William Dowsing, who was resident in the building throughout the war from at least 1642 to 1661 – though the religious enforcer had closer ties with nearby Coddenham, possibly due to his dislike of then-minister John Bird. Bird was in charge of Baylham Church from 1625-1645 before being ejected for having a second holding in Bedfordshire.

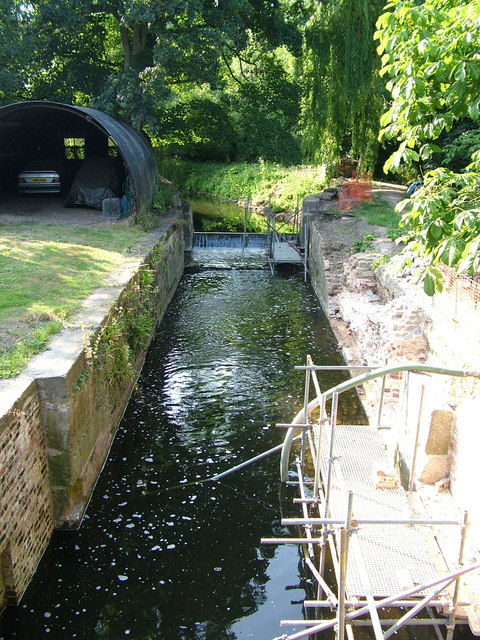
Baylham Lock

Baylham saw something of a boon for its agricultural industry in the late 18th century when the canalisation of the Gipping from Stowmarket to Ipswich, led by famed engineer John Rennie, took place in the 1790s, allowing for easier transport to and from its millhouse, as well as the later construction of a water mill. Remaining elements of these works are among the oldest examples of Rennie's designs.

=== Modern ===
Baylham remained a strongly agriculture-centred village into the 20th century, with the principal holding from 1891-1912 belonging to James Saumarez, a wealthy lord with lands throughout Suffolk. In the 1831 census 55 residents were listed as working the land, with six in retail and one blacksmith, overseen by six farmers out of a population of 238. This number fluctuated only a little through the 19th and 20th centuries, reaching a zenith of 310 inhabitants in 1851. before declining again to 215 in 1981.

In 2002 Baylham Mill briefly became famous as the home and place of discovery of a lost artwork by Nicolas Poussin, The Destruction And Sack Of The Temple Of Jerusalem. Ernest Onians, a pigswill salesman who had lived at the mill for many years and was an avid art collector, had acquired the piece while visiting house sales in the 1940s and '50s. Unaware of its provenance, he kept it at the mill along with around 1,000 other works, and never had it appraised. When he died in 1995 the painting was included in a general sale of goods by auction house Sotheby's, and mistakenly sold at a guide price of £15,000 under the name of Poussain's pupil, Pietro Testa. Bidding soared to £155,000 and it was eventually acquired by London gallery Hazlitt, Gooden and Fox – which went on to resell the piece for £4.5 million to the Rothschild foundation. The Destruction And Sack Of The Temple Of Jerusalem was later donated to the Israel Museum in Jerusalem. Sotheby's was sued by Mr Onians' family and eventually paid out a six figure sum over the error.

Baylham's position on the Gipping saw it included in a number of works in the 2010s aimed at re-opening the canalised river to walking and navigation, organised through the River Gipping Trust. Restoration of Baylham's sluice gates and lock took place in 2013 and 2016.

A considerable expansion of the number of properties took place after the turn of the millennium, which had increased population density by around 16% as of the 2021 census.

== Economy ==
Fertile mixed farmlands have underpinned a mixed agricultural economy throughout Baylham's recorded history, with sheep farming in the 11th century and widely varied croplands from the 16th century onwards, the main cash crop being barley. As of the 20th century, wheat, barley and peas were mainstay crops, while in the 21st century some land was given over to horse pasture.

Beyond Baylham Rare Breeds Farm, agricultural enterprises in the area today include White Wheat Farm to the north, Yew Tree and Hill Farm to the south and Moat Farm on its eastern edge.

Modern day businesses include a garage sited next to the B113 and Baylham Care Centre – an over-65s nursing home supporting up to 55 people. The latter made headlines in 2014 for its innovative approach to dementia care, which included building a replica village for residents. Baylham Business Centre, off the B113, is home to Eastern Region Training, a learning facility for health and safety in the construction trade.

Many of the village's other former economic staples, including the quarry, a blacksmith and shoemaker in the 19th century, along with its post office and local shop, have been closed and/or converted to residential use. As of 2008, the Mid Suffolk Core Strategy defined Baylham as a Countryside Village, noting its lack of local services and high prevalence (66%) of oil-fired central heating.

== Governance and services ==
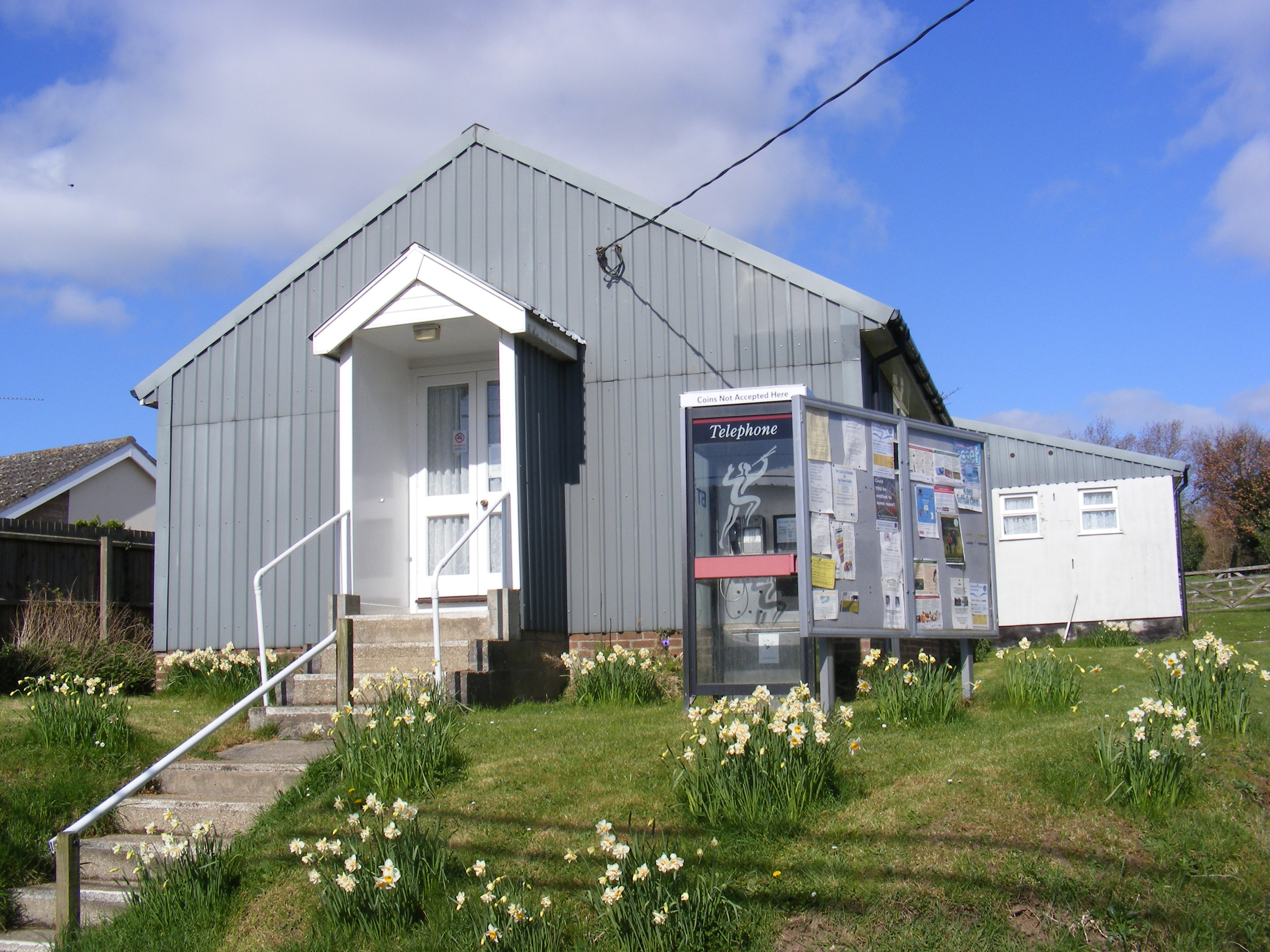
Baylham Village Hall. Restored in 1997, the hall is on Upper Street and hosts regular events

Following the Roman withdrawal the region in which Baylham sits was governed through the hundreds system, specifically Bosmere (named after a lake a mile south-east of Needham Market). In the early Anglo-Saxon period it was within the southern division of the Kingdom of East Anglia, then fell under the Danelaw from 855-954, when it was incorporated into the kingdom of Edward the Elder. Following the Norman Conquest it was merged with the Claydon hundred in 1086 to form Bosmere and Claydon.

The hundreds system made way for the system of parliamentary constituencies and district-level services in the 19th century, with Baylham now falling within the district council ward of Needham Market, Mid Suffolk.

The village is represented in Parliament by the MP for Central Suffolk and North Ipswich.

At a local level the village has an active parish council

=== Transport ===
The Ipswich to Stowmarket 88 bus route stops at the bottom of the hill, and passes through Needham Market, where the closest railway station can be found.

It is possible to walk the length of the River Gipping through Claydon to Bramford and Ipswich.

== Demography ==
The current population of Baylham is 300.

Prior to the modern census system demographic records were relatively inconsistent, with records switching between headcounts, taxpayers and households. From 1801 the census counted inhabitants.

=== Pre to early-modern ===
| Year | 1086 | 1327 | 1524 | 1603 | 1674 |
| Population | 38 | 20 | 20 | 80 | 35 |

=== Modern ===
| Year | 1801 | 1831 | 1851 | 1871 | 1901 | 1931 | 1951 | 1971 | 1981 | 2001 | 2011 | 2021 |
| Population | 232 | 238 | 310 | 275 | 255 | 249 | 218 | 239 | 215 | 251 | 266 | 300 |

All numbers retrieved from Heritage Suffolk and ONS census data.

=== Health, ethnicity and religion ===
As of the 2021 census, Baylham's population has tended to be older, in better health and with a higher rate of home ownership than the national average. The population is relatively homogenous with 99.3% of people identifying as ethnically white and only 2.3% feeling their national identity was "non-UK" or "both UK and non-UK". The village is around the national average in its overall level of religious belief, with 30% of respondents stating they were of no religion.

== Landmarks ==
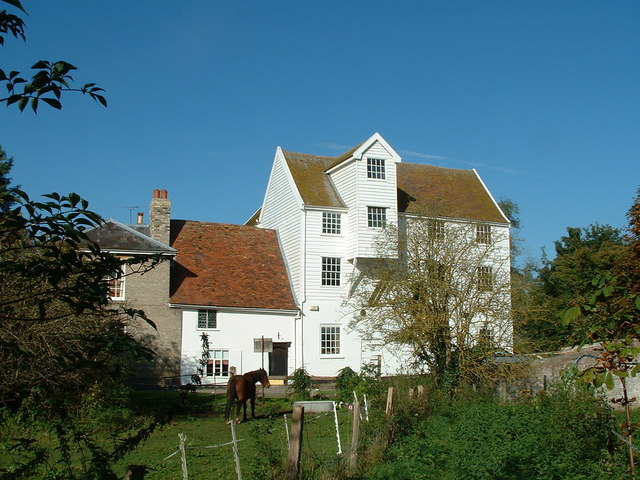
Baylham Mill

Baylham is situated within a Special Landscape Area and is most famous for its old millhouse, built in the early 16th century with a pre-Reformation core, which has been represented in pictures by Graham Bell and David Gentleman and is now a private abode. The associated bridge and watermill are newer constructions, built in the early or mid 18th and 19th centuries respectively.

Nearby is Baylham House Farm, Mill Lane, also known as Baylham Rare Breeds Centre (0.5 miles (0.80 km) northeast from the village) on the other side of the B1113. While it technically sits within the historic boundaries of Coddenham parish, construction of the Great Eastern Main Line and A14 to its east and north has effectively made it part of Baylham. The 50-acre farm is built on the former Roman settlement site, and while no ruins remain, artifacts are on display in the farm shop. Parts of the farmhouse itself date back to the 16th century, and it was once home to Dowsing.

Baylham Hall, an early 17th century manor house sited west of the main village, is Grade II* listed. Baylham Common is 100 metres west of the church on the other side of the road.

Column Field Quarry, also known as Masons Quarry, sits astride the Baylham/Great Blakenham border to the south. Formerly mined by the Masons Cement Works, it closed in 1999. The chalk pit is currently partially unused, or being used for landfill, and has been subject to several controversial development applications including for winter sports facility SnOasis, which fell afoul of a protection order related to great crested newts in the 2000s, and its successor project Valley Ridge

On the edge of the parish boundary, to the west of Ditch Wood in the neighbouring parish of Barking, is Tarston Hall, a Grade II listed building featuring a medieval double moat. Tarston is thought to have been constructed in the 16th century with later additions.

=== The Church of St Peter ===
The church is sited at the west end of the village, on a hill just off Church Lane. It was initially constructed in late Romanesque style in the 12th century and had Gothic style windows inserted in the 14th and 15th centuries. Its fittings from this era partially survived both the English Reformation and the later inspection of Dowsing, albeit with damage to animal figures and a symbol of the trilogy. An alabaster of the crucifixion, hidden from the inspection, lay unnoticed in the roofspace of a former clergyman's house opposite the church until its rediscovery and reinstallation in 1774.

The church was restored in the 1870s by Revd W E Downes, who commissioned architect Frederick Barnes to carry out the work. Barnes was also responsible for the construction of Needham Market and Stowmarket railway stations. Downes, who acted as rector for 40 years, died in 1899 and was memorialised with a plaque.

Several burial slabs in the church reference the Acton family. Most notable is the monument to William Acton (c. 1684–1744), who was Tory MP for Orford in 1722–27 and 1729–34, as well as High Sheriff of Suffolk in 1739-40.

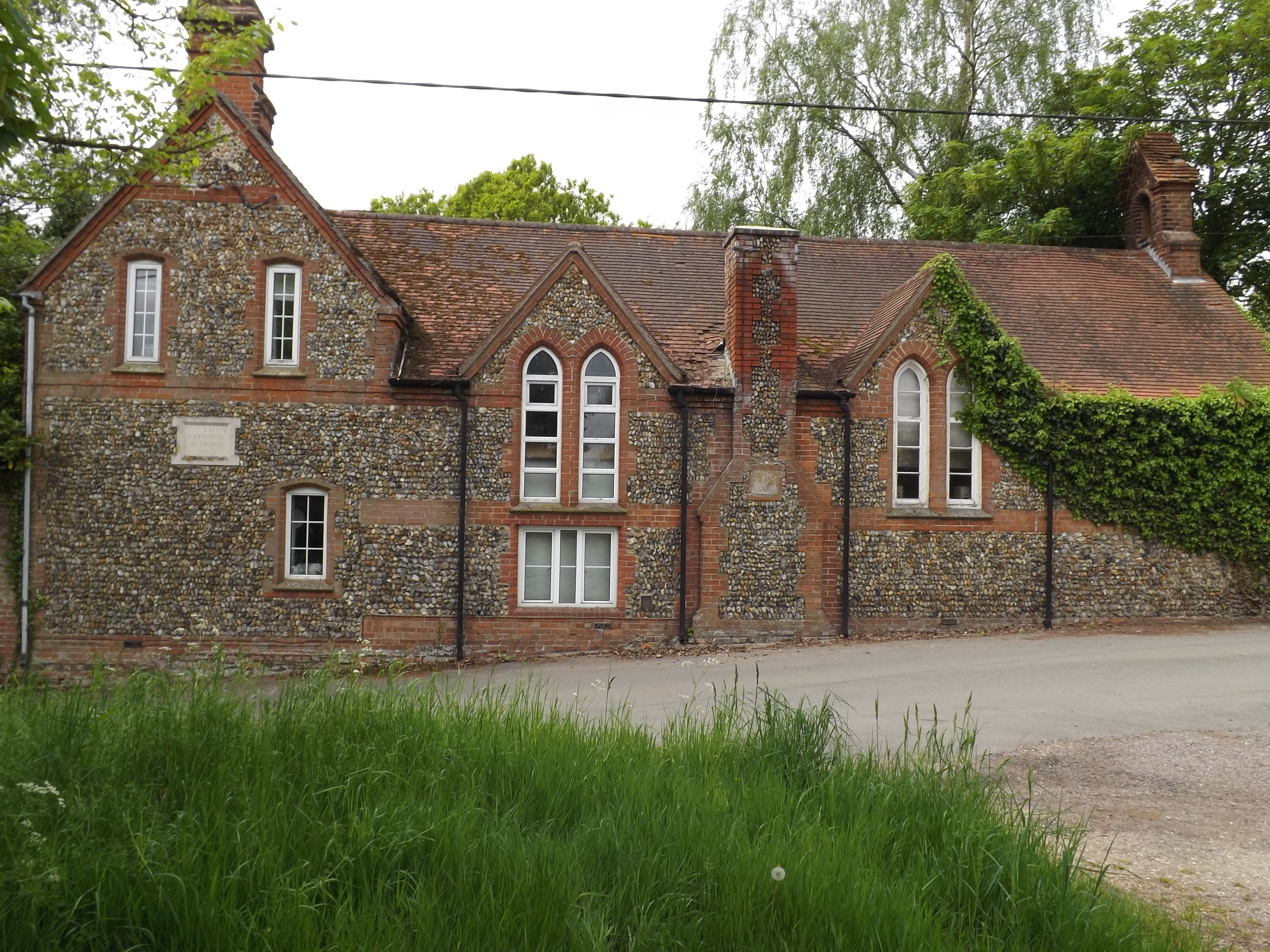
The School House, Baylham

Two buildings which were originally part of the church estate are the old vicarage to the north of the church and a village school to its south, which taught around 70 pupils from the surrounding villages of Nettestead, Darmsden, Great Blakenham and Lower Baylham. Founded in 1860, Baylham School closed in the late 1960s, and both buildings have since become private residences.

== Notable people ==
- William Acton (c. 1684–1744), Member of Parliament for Orford.
- James Andrew (d. 1434), Member of Parliament for Ipswich
- John Andrew (1421-1473), Member of Parliament for Ipswich and Bletchingley
- William Dowsing (c. 1596–1668), influential puritan and iconoclast
- Katherine Rednall (b. 1996), youngest-ever World Indoor Bowls Champion

== Geography ==
=== Climate ===
According to the Köppen classification the British Isles experience a maritime climate characterised by relatively cool summers and mild winters. East Anglia is slightly warmer and sunnier in the summer and colder and frostier in the winter than elsewhere in Britain, with low rainfall.

The nearest weather station to Baylham is at Wattisham Airfield, 4.4 miles (7 km) to the west. Its readings show temperatures typically varying from 1 °C to 22 °C, only infrequently reaching below −3 °C or above 27 °C.

Climate data for Wattisham Airfield
| Month | Jan | Feb | Mar | Apr | May | Jun | Jul | Aug | Sep | Oct | Nov | Dec | Year |
|---|---|---|---|---|---|---|---|---|---|---|---|---|---|
| Mean daily maximum °C (°F) | 6 (43) | 7 (45) | 9 (48) | 12 (54) | 16 (61) | 18 (64) | 21 (70) | 21 (70) | 18 (64) | 14 (57) | 10 (50) | 7 (45) | 13 (56) |
| Daily mean °C (°F) | 4 (39) | 4 (39) | 6 (43) | 8 (46) | 12 (54) | 14 (57) | 17 (63) | 17 (63) | 14 (57) | 11 (52) | 7 (45) | 5 (41) | 10 (50) |
| Mean daily minimum °C (°F) | 2 (36) | 1 (34) | 3 (37) | 4 (39) | 7 (45) | 10 (50) | 12 (54) | 12 (54) | 10 (50) | 8 (46) | 4 (39) | 2 (36) | 6 (43) |
| Average precipitation mm (inches) | 39.7 (1.56) | 31.2 (1.23) | 30.2 (1.19) | 29.4 (1.16) | 37.1 (1.46) | 42.9 (1.69) | 37.1 (1.46) | 38.1 (1.50) | 39.5 (1.56) | 49.7 (1.96) | 45.8 (1.80) | 43.7 (1.72) | 464.4 (18.29) |
Source: Met Office

=== Geology and topography ===
While much of Suffolk is low-lying, founded on Pleistocene sand and clays toward the coast, Mid-Suffolk and the west of the county is on Cretaceous chalk rising to 136 meters to the south-west of Bury St Edmunds.

Baylham lies within a band of Upper Cretaceous chalk that runs the length of the Gipping Valley, rising from 10m above sea level at the banks of the river to 73m at the site of Baylham Hall.

Sands and gravels of uncertain origin are common on the valley floor and river terrace deposits have been mapped, while a mix of loam, sandy soil and clay soils overlay chalk rock on the hill. Red rock and glacial deposits have been found via the chalk pits and bore holes dug in neighbouring Great Blakenham, but the primary unit, known as the Blakenham Chalk Member, is widely developed and largely flintless.

=== Wildlife ===
Beyond the presence of great crested newts, Grey Wagtails are known to breed in old river structures along the Gipping, including at Baylham Lock. Mistle Thrush and the Greater white-fronted goose have been spotted in recent years.
