= Charles le Grosse =

English politician

Sir Charles Le Grosse (c.1596 – 1650) of Crostwight Hall near North Walsham in Norfolk, England, was a politician who sat in the House of Commons at various times between 1628 and 1653.

== Origins ==
Le Grosse was the son of Sir Thomas Le Grosse / Le Gros (died 1613) of Crostwight and of Sloley, both in Norfolk, by his wife Elizabeth Cornwallis, a daughter of Sir Charles Cornwallis, of Brome, Suffolk, MP. The Le Grosse family probably descended from William Gross of Norfolk, a land-holder mentioned in the Domesday Book of 1086. The chest tomb of Oliver le Gros (died 1435) survives in St Bartholomew's Church, Sloley, displaying the arms of Le Gross: Quarterly argent and azure, on a bend sable three martlets or, which also survives on the "Crostwight Flagon", a silver wine flagon made in 1585 by Peterson of Norwich, presented to Crostwight Church probably by Thomas Le Gross, now in Norwich Castle Museum.

== Career ==
He was knighted on 6 December 1616 and served as Sheriff of Norfolk for 1626–27. In 1628 he was elected as a Member of Parliament for Orford in Suffolk, and sat until 1629 when King Charles I decided to rule without parliament for eleven years. In April 1640, Le Grosse was re-elected MP for Orford in the Short Parliament and was re-elected MP for Orford for the Long Parliament in November 1640, retaining his seat until 1653. In 1637, together with Dr. Thomas Lushington, he was instrumental in persuading the physician and philosopher Thomas Browne, to re-locate to Norwich. In 1658 Browne dedicated his Hydriotaphia, Urn Burial to Thomas Le Grosse, his eldest son. Le Grosse died before 31 May 1660.

== Marriage and issue ==
He married Muriel Knyvet, a daughter of Sir Thomas Knyvet (died 1605) by his wife Elizabeth, and by the marriage settlement he acquired a moiety of the manor of Eccles, which allowed him to hold courts there. By his wife he had two sons and six daughters, including:

- Thomas Le Grosse, eldest son and heir.

== Poem by Ralph Knevet ==
The poet Ralph Knevet dedicated the following poem to him:

The King of Pyrrhus shewd the Muses nine
And Phoebus portraited by sculpture fine:
But thou faire Knight-hoods fairer ornament
Conspicuously dost to our eyes present
Phoebus, the Muses nine, the Graces three,
Mercurie, and Mars, yea more Gods then bee
In Homers Iliads; or at least much greater:
For thy mind's a Pantheon, or a Theater,
Wherein all vertues, and all graces stand,
In decent order link'd, with hand in hand.
The[e] 'mongst the chiefest of the Arts few friends
I list: and so adore thy noble ends,
That if my Quill to vertue can life give,
Thy honourd fame shall Nestors age outlive.

Parliament of England
Preceded by Sir Robert Hitcham; Charles Croft	Member of Parliament for Orford; 1628–1629; With: Sir Lionel Tollemache, 2nd Baronet	Parliament suspended until 1640
Vacant Parliament suspended since 1629	Member of Parliament for Orford; 1640–1653; With: Sir Edward Duke, 1st Baronet 1640; Sir William Playters, 2nd Baronet 1640–1648	Not represented in Barebones Parliament
