= Edward Duke =

Edward Duke may refer to:

- Sir Edward Duke, 1st Baronet (c. 1604–1671), English politician
- Edward Duke (antiquary) (1779–1852), English antiquary
- Sir Edward Duke, 3rd Baronet (c. 1694–1732), MP for Orford
