= Thomas Spicer =

Thomas Spicer may refer to:

- Thomas Spicer (Arundel MP), in 1406 MP for Arundel (UK Parliament constituency)
- Thomas Spicer (Orford MP) (died 1559 or later), English MP for Orford
- Thomas le Spicer, MP for Bristol (UK Parliament constituency)
- Tommy Spicer (footballer), English footballer
