= Dudley North (politician, born 1684) =

British landowner and Tory politician (1684-1730)

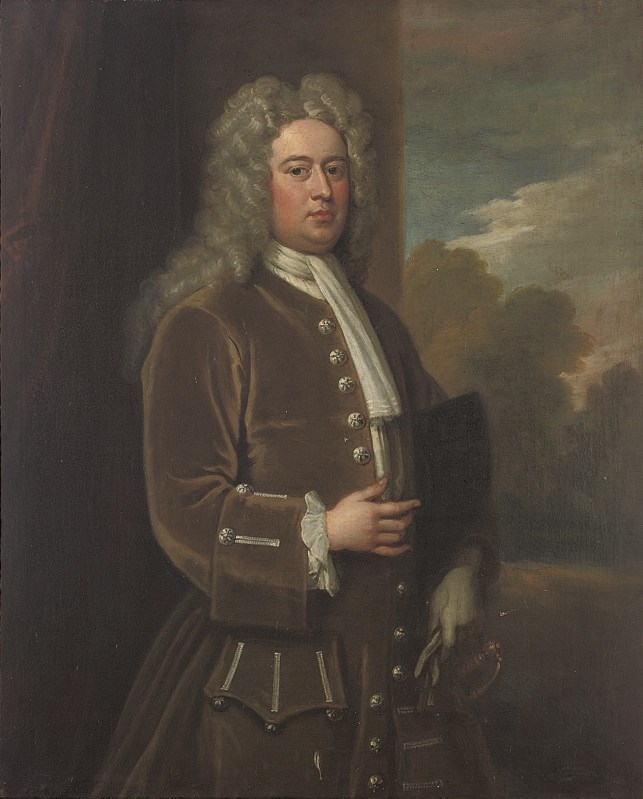
Dudley North of Glemham

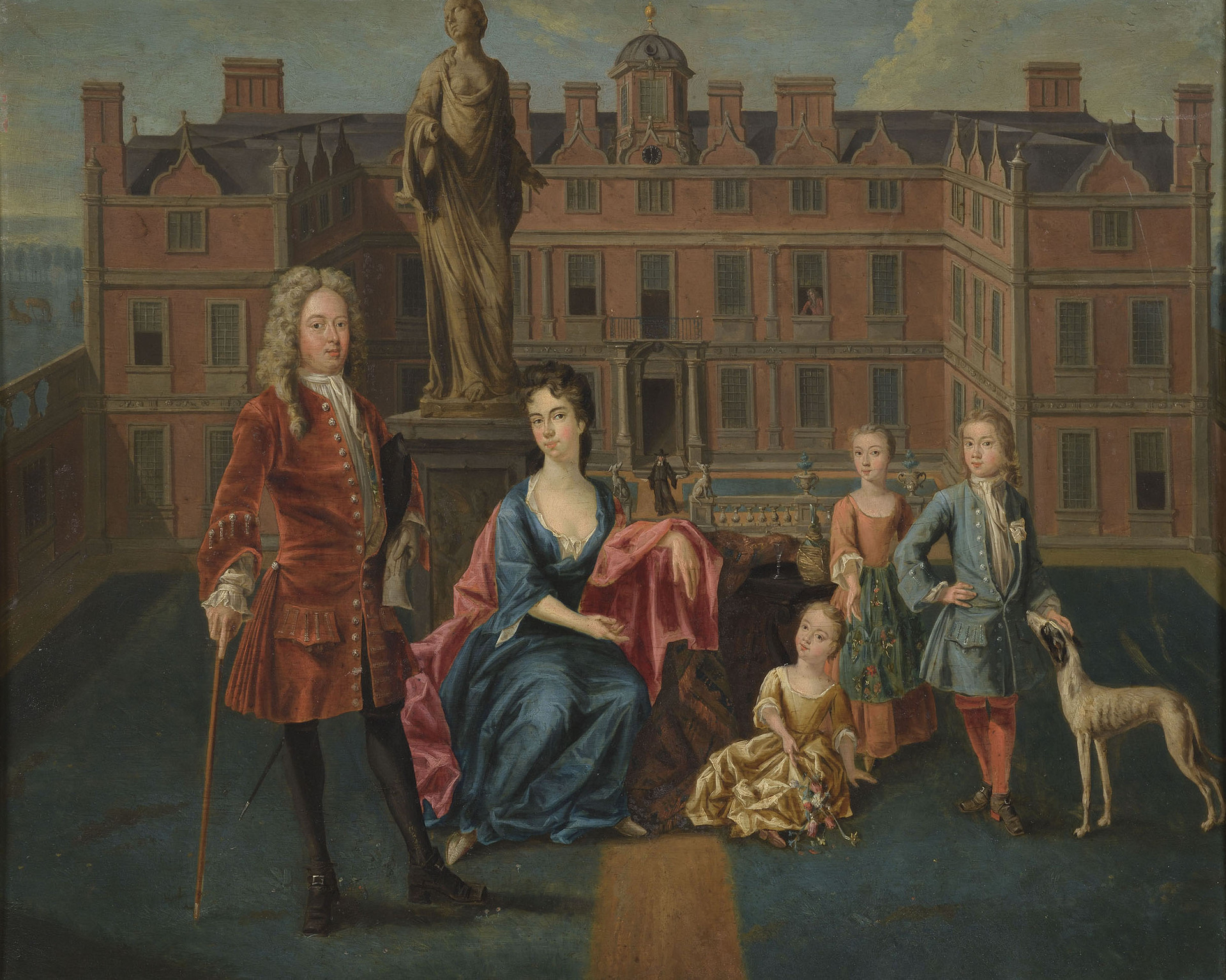
Glemham Hall, family seat of the Norths

Dudley North (23 August 1684 – 1730) of Glemham Hall, Little Glemham, Suffolk was a British landowner and Tory politician who sat in the House of Commons from 1710 to 1730. He was a cousin of Lord North, the British prime minister who later lost the American War of Independence.

== Biography ==
North was the eldest and only surviving son of Sir Dudley North of Camden Place, Maiden Lane, London and his wife Anne Cann, daughter of Sir Robert Cann, 1st Baronet of Compton Greenfield, Gloucestershire. His aunt was Countess Elizabeth North of Oxnead Hall.

A member of the House of North, he was a grandson of Anne Montagu of Boughton House of the House of Montagu, and Baron Dudley North of Kirtling Tower. His father was well known as a merchant, economist, and Tory politician and had purchased the Glemham estate shortly before his death in 1691.

North was educated privately at Kensington, with ‘Mr Agier’; and was admitted at St. John’s College, Cambridge on 12 May 1701. Some time before 1708, he married, with £20,000, Katherine Yale (died 1715), daughter of Elihu Yale of Plas Grono, near Wrexham. Yale gave his name to Yale University. Her sister married Lord James Cavendish.

North stood for Parliament at Thetford at the 1708 British general election with Sir Thomas Hanmer, 4th Baronet to whom he was related, but was unsuccessful. He became a common councilman for Dunwich in 1710. At the 1710 British general election, he was returned unopposed as Tory Member of Parliament.

He was classified as one of the ‘worthy patriots’ who brought to light the mismanagements of the previous ministry. In March 1711 he was appointed to a drafting committee for a private bill on Great Yarmouth harbour, and was also chosen to draft a bill to curb wool smuggling. He became an alderman of Dunwich in 1712 and was bailiff for the year 1713 to 1714. He was returned for Thetford again at the 1713 British general election again with Hanmer’s support.

North was returned for Thetford again in 1715 and from then on voted consistently against the Government. At the 1722 British general election, he transferred to Orford and was returned on the Price Devereux interest He was elected for Orford again in 1727. He died on 4 February 1730.

== Family ==
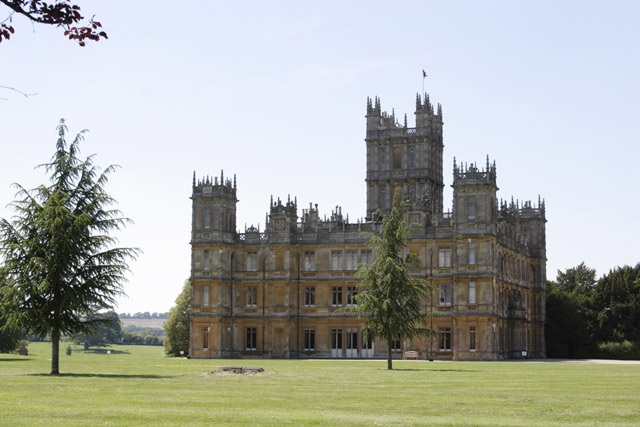
Highclere Castle, seat of the Herbert family, estate used in Downton Abbey

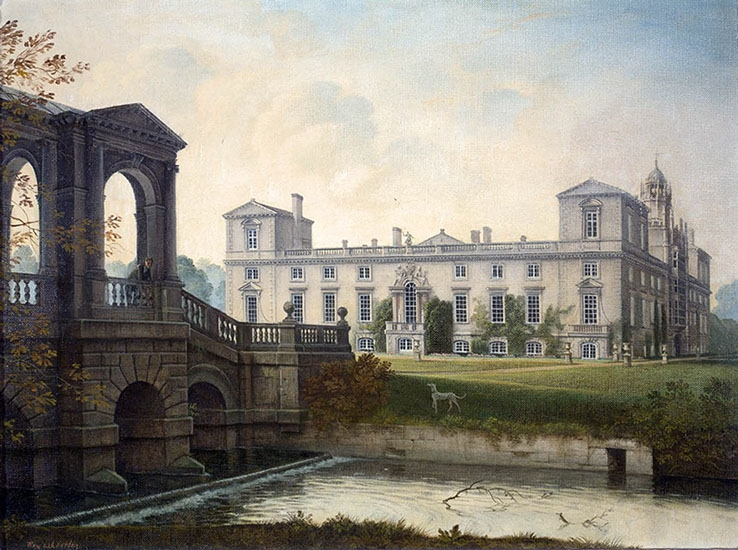
Wilton House, seat of the Herbert family, estate used in Bridgerton

Lord North, the Prime Minister of Great Britain who led the American War of Independence, was his first cousin, being descended from his uncle, Lord Chancellor Francis North, 1st Baron Guilford, of Wroxton Abbey.

His other uncle was Roger North, Solicitor General of the Duke of York, and Attorney General of Queen Mary of Modena of the House of Este, and his cousin was Lt. Gen. William North, 6th Baron North, who served under Prince John Churchill, 1st Duke of Marlborough of Blenheim Palace.

=== Children ===
Dudley North had two sons, and three daughters of whom one son and one daughter predeceased him. His daughter Mary became the mother of Dudley Long North, coheir of his estate. His daughter Anne North Yale married Nicholas Herbert, son of Thomas Herbert, 8th Earl of Pembroke of Wilton House and Margaret Sawyer of Highclere Castle.

It was her father, Sir Robert Sawyer who built and owned Highclere Castle. At his death, the castle and estates went to Thomas and Margaret, until her death. It then passed to Nicholas's brother, Robert Sawyer Herbert (died 1769).

One of Dudley's son, William Dudley North Yale, also married into the Herbert family, this time to Lady Barbara Herbert, daughter of Thomas Herbert, 8th Earl of Pembroke and his second wife, Barbara Herbert, Countess of Pembroke. The children were raised at Highclere Castle by Reverend Isaac Milles.

The North/Yale children were cousins of Francis North, 1st Earl of Guilford, and his son Lord North.

Parliament of Great Britain
Preceded by Robert Baylis; Thomas de Grey	Member of Parliament for Thetford; 1710–1722; With: Sir Thomas Hanmer 1710; Sir Edmund Bacon 1710-1713; Sir William Barker 1713-1715; John Ward 1715-1722	Succeeded by Sir Edmund Bacon; Robert Jacomb
Preceded by Clement Corrance; Sir Edward Duke	Member of Parliament for Orford; 1722–1730; With: William Acton 1722-1727; Hon. Price Devereux 1727-1729; William Acton 1729-1730	Succeeded by Robert Kemp; William Acton
