= Duke baronets =

Extinct baronetcy in the Baronetage of the United Kingdom

There have been two Duke Baronetcies; both are now extinct. The first was created on 16 July 1661 for Edward Duke in the Baronetage of England, and the second was created on 5 December 1848 for James Duke in the Baronetage of the United Kingdom.

== Duke of Benhall, Suffolk (1661) ==
- Sir Edward Duke, 1st Baronet (c. 1604–1670). He was one of two MPs for Orford during the Short Parliament in 1640.
- Sir John Duke, 2nd Baronet (3 January 1632 – 24 July 1705). Sir John was also MP for Orford, serving 1679–1685, 1689–1690 and 1697–1698.
- Sir Edward Duke, 3rd Baronet (c. 1694 – 25 August 1732). Sir Edward, like his predecessors in the title, served as MP for Orford (1721–1722).

Extinct on his death

== Duke of London (1849) ==
- Sir James Duke, 1st Baronet (31 January 1792 – 28 May 1873). Sir James was MP for Boston (1837–1849) and the City of London (1849–1865).
- Sir James Duke, 2nd Baronet (25 January 1865 – 3 July 1935).

Extinct on his death
