= Robert Jacomb =

British financier and politician (1680–1732)

Robert Jacomb (6 December 1680 – 1732) of Feltwell, Norfolk, and Whitehall, London, was a British financier and politician who sat in the House of Commons from 1722 to 1732.

Jacomb was the third son of William Jacomb of St. Mary Aldermary, London, and his wife Mary Blayney, daughter of Robert Blayney of London. He was educated at Eton College from 1692 to 1695. He married Francis Eyre who died in 1716 and then, as his second wife, Lucy Pemberton. At some time he purchased Dunton's Manor at Feltwell, Norfolk from the Fleetwood family.

Jacomb was a clerk to Thomas Gibson. Later, he became a partner in the firm of Gibson, Jacob & Jacomb who were scriveners and bankers. From 1716 to 1720 he was Inspector General of Accounts of the Outports. Gibson recommended him to Sir Robert Walpole for his expertise in funds and government accounts and. Walpole began to rely on him. When Walpole returned to the pay office in 1720, he appointed Jacomb as deputy paymaster general. Jacomb handled Walpole's private and official investments during the South Sea Bubble crisis. He conceived the 'ingraftment scheme', under which the Bank of England and the East India Company would take on some of the inflated capital of the South Sea Company. This scheme was adopted by Walpole and passed into law, but was never implemented.

Jacomb was returned unopposed as Member of Parliament for Thetford through Walpole's influence at the 1722 general election. He often sat on the committees appointed to prepare the finance bills each session. He was returned unopposed again as MP for Thetford at the 1727 general election.

Jacomb died on 14 December 1732. He had a son by each of his wives.

Parliament of Great Britain
Preceded by John Ward; Dudley North	Member of Parliament for Thetford; 1722–1732; With: Sir Edmund Bacon	Succeeded by Sir Edmund Bacon; Charles FitzRoy-Scudamore
