= POTY =

POTY or Poty may refer to:

== Acronyms ==
- Person of the Year
- Player of the year award

== People ==
- Poty Lazzarotto (1924–1998), Brazilian artist
- Édouard Poty, Belgian sports shooter, see Shooting at the 1908 Summer Olympics – Men's 300 metre free rifle, team
- Paul Poty (1889–1962), French naturalist
- Richard Poty (c. 16th century), English MP
