= Benhall Street =

Hamlet in Suffolk, England

Coordinates: 52.199°N 1.452°E

- Location within Suffolk
- OS grid reference: TM359612
- Civil parish: Benhall
- District: East Suffolk
- Shire county: Suffolk
- Region: East
- Country: England
- Sovereign state: United Kingdom
- Police: Suffolk
- Fire: Suffolk
- Ambulance: East of England
- UK Parliament: Suffolk Coastal

Benhall Street is a hamlet in Suffolk, England, in Benhall civil parish. It lies close to the River Alde, about 1.5 miles (2.4 km) west of the main settlement in the parish, Benhall Green; and about 2 miles (3.2 km) south-west of the town of Saxmundham.
