= Sandell =

Sandell as a surname can refer to:

- Andy Sandell (born 1983), British football player
- Annemari Sandell-Hyvärinen (born 1977), Finnish long-distance runner
- Åsa Sandell (born 1967), Swedish journalist and professional boxer
- Ellen Sandell (born 1984), Australian environmentalist
- Håkan Sandell (born 1962), Swedish poet
- Joakim Sandell (born 1975), Swedish politician
- Leonard Sandell, English MP
- Lina Sandell (1832–1903), Swedish hymn writer
- Nils-Åke Sandell (1927–1992), Swedish football player and manager
- Patrik Sandell (born 1982), Swedish rally driver and 2006 junior world champion
- Robert J. Sandell, World War II fighter ace; see List of Flying Tigers pilots
- Sami Sandell (born 1987), Finnish ice hockey player
- Tate Sandell (born 2003), American football player
- Thomas Sandell, Swedish investment banker and billionaire
- William Sandell, Academy Award nominated art director

== See also ==
- Sandels (disambiguation)
- The Sandals, a 1960s surf rock band also known as the Sandells
- Sandel (disambiguation)
