= Sir Edmund Bacon, 5th Baronet =

British Whig politician

Sir Edmund Bacon, 5th Baronet (7 August 1693 – 4 October 1738), of Gillingham, Norfolk, was a British Whig politician who sat in the House of Commons from 1722 to 1738.

== Early life ==
Bacon was the eldest son of Sir Edmund Bacon, 4th Baronet of Mildenhall, and his first wife Philippa Bacon, daughter of Sir Edmund Bacon, 4th Baronet of Redgrave. He attended school in Beccles and Bishop Stortford and was admitted at Caius College, Cambridge in 1710. He was admitted at Middle Temple in 1714 and from 1716 to 1720 he was a fellow at Cambridge. In 1721, he succeeded his father to the baronetcy. He married Susan Rebow, daughter of Sir Isaac Rebow, of Colchester, on 7 November 1724, at the Chapel Royal in St James's Palace.

== Career ==
At the 1722 British general election, Bacon was returned unopposed as Member of Parliament (MP) for Thetford. He made his first recorded speech on 12 November 1724, when he seconded the Address. He spoke for the Government on the army on 23 November 1724 and 25 January 1727, and on a vote of credit on 12 April 1727. At the 1727 British general election he was returned again for Thetford and continued making contributions. He spoke on the Address on 21 January 1729 and on 13 January 1730, on the army on 29 January 1730 and on Dunkirk on 12 February 1730. He was commended for his wise speech when the salt duty was taken off' in 1730. He spoke on the Hessians on 3 February 1731 and on foreign affairs on 23 February. 1731. He was seen as an attached servant to Sir Robert Walpole and was duly rewarded. He held a grant of some lighthouses worth £500 a year for a term of years, and in 1733 was shown to have a grant of crown lands at Chatham while his brother held a post in the customs. Bacon was returned unopposed again at the 1734 British general election, In 1737, he spoke against Sir John Barnard's scheme for converting the national debt.

== Death and legacy ==
Bacon died at Bath, Somerset on 4 October 1738, and was buried at Gillingham, Norfolk, two weeks later. He and his wife had a daughter and two sons, and his only surviving son, Edmund, succeeded to the baronetcy.

Parliament of Great Britain
Preceded by John Ward; Dudley North	Member of Parliament for Thetford; 1722 – 1738; With: Robert Jacomb 1722–1733; Charles FitzRoy-Scudamore 1733–1738	Succeeded by Lord Augustus Fitzroy; Charles FitzRoy-Scudamore
Baronetage of England
Preceded by Edmund Bacon	Baronet (of Mildenhall); 1721 – 1738	Succeeded by Edmund Bacon
