= Alan Brodrick =

Alan Brodrick may refer to:

- Alan Brodrick, 1st Viscount Midleton (c. 1656–1728), Irish lawyer and politician
- Alan Brodrick, 2nd Viscount Midleton (1702–1747), British peer and cricket patron
- Alan Brodrick, 12th Viscount Midleton (born 1949)

== See also ==
- Sir Allen Brodrick (1623–1680), English politician
