= John Harman =

John Harman may refer to:

== Politicians ==
- John Harman (Australian politician) (1932–1998), Speaker of the Legislative Assembly of Western Australia
- John Harman (British politician) (born 1950), UK Labour Party politician
- John Harman (MP) for Orford and Bletchingley

== Others ==
- John Harman, birth name of John Vesey, later Bishop Vesey.
- John Harman (admiral) (died 1673), English naval officer
- John B. Harman (1907–1994), British physician
- John Harman (British Army soldier) (1914–1944), Victoria Cross recipient
- John A. Harman (1824–1874), Confederate States Army officer
