= John Valentine =

John Valentine may refer to:

- John Valentine (composer) (1730–1791), English composer, father of composer Ann Valentine
- John Valentine (cricketer) (born 1954), Canadian cricketer
- John Valentine (baseball) (1855–1903), American baseball player and umpire
- John J. Valentine, Sr. (1840–1901), president of Wells Fargo
- John L. Valentine (born 1949), Utah State Senator
- John Valentine, character from Twilight Zone: The Movie
- John Valentine (MP), 16th-century member of Parliament for Orford

Johnny Valentine may refer to:

- Johnny Valentine (1928–2001), American professional wrestler
- Johnny Valentine (footballer), played for Rangers F.C. in the 1957 Scottish League Cup Final
- Johnny Valentine (singer), a pseudonym of American singer-songwriter Terry Fell
- Johnny Valentine, the penname of American writer Sasha Alyson

== See also ==
- John Valentin (born 1967), American baseball player
