= Sandel =

Sandel may refer to:

- Sandel (novel), a 1968 novel by Angus John Mackintosh Stewart
- Aïn Sandel, a town in Algeria
- Mount Sandel (disambiguation)

== People ==
- Ari Sandel (born 1974), American director and co-writer of 2005 Oscar-winning comedy short "West Bank Story"
- Cora Sandel (1880–1974), Norwegian writer who lived most of her life in France and Sweden
- Jean Mary Sandel (1916–1974), New Zealand surgeon
- Jerry Sandel (1942–2024), American politician
- Józef Sandel (1894–1962), Polish art critic
- Maria Sandel (1870–1927), Swedish textile worker, writer, feminist, and social critic
- Michael Sandel (born 1953), American political philosopher
- Sue Sandel, or Sue Pritzker (1932–1982), American socialite, activist, and philanthropist
- Warren Sandel (1921–1993), American baseball player

== See also ==
- Sandal (disambiguation)
- Sandell, a surname
- Sandels (disambiguation)
