= Sir Edmund Bacon, 4th Baronet, of Mildenhall =

English politician

Sir Edmund Bacon, 4th Baronet (6 April 1672 – 10 July 1721) was an English politician.

He was the oldest son of Sir Henry Bacon, 3rd Baronet and his wife Sarah Castleton, daughter of Sir John Castleton, 2nd Baronet. In 1686, he succeeded his father as baronet. He studied at St John's College, Cambridge. Between 1700 and 1708, Bacon represented Orford and sat as Member of Parliament (MP) in both the Parliaments of England and Great Britain.

On 25 December 1688, he married Philippa Bacon, daughter of his cousin Sir Edmund Bacon, 4th Baronet, of Redgrave at Redgrave, Suffolk. Philippa died in 1710 and Bacon married again Mary Castell, daughter of John Castell at Raveningham on 16 April 1713. He had five sons and two daughters by his first wife and two sons and two daughters by his second wife. A week after his death, Bacon was buried at Gillingham, Norfolk. He was succeeded in the baronetcy successively by his three sons Edmund, Henry and Richard.

Parliament of England
Preceded by Charles Hedges; Sir Thomas Felton	Member of Parliament for Orford; 1700 – 1707; With: William Johnson 1700–1701; Sir Edward Turnor 1701–1707	Succeeded by Parliament of Great Britain
Parliament of Great Britain
Preceded by Parliament of England	Member of Parliament for Orford; 1707 – 1708; With: Sir Edward Turnor	Succeeded by Clement Corrance; Sir Edward Turnor
Baronetage of England
Preceded by Henry Bacon	Baronet (of Mildenhall); 1686–1721	Succeeded by Edmund Bacon
