= Sandels =

Sandels may refer to:

- Sandels (beer), a Finnish beer brand
- Sandels (noble family), a Swedish noble family
- Hilda Sandels (1830–1921), Swedish opera singer
- Johan August Sandels (1764–1831), Swedish nobleman

== See also ==
- Sandel (disambiguation)
- Sandell, a surname
