= Richard Hunt (MP) =

Richard Hunt (1462/63-aft.1529), of Orford, Suffolk, was an English Member of Parliament (MP).

He was a Member of the Parliament of England for Orford in 1529.
