= Richard Wingfield (MP for Orford) =

16th-century English politician

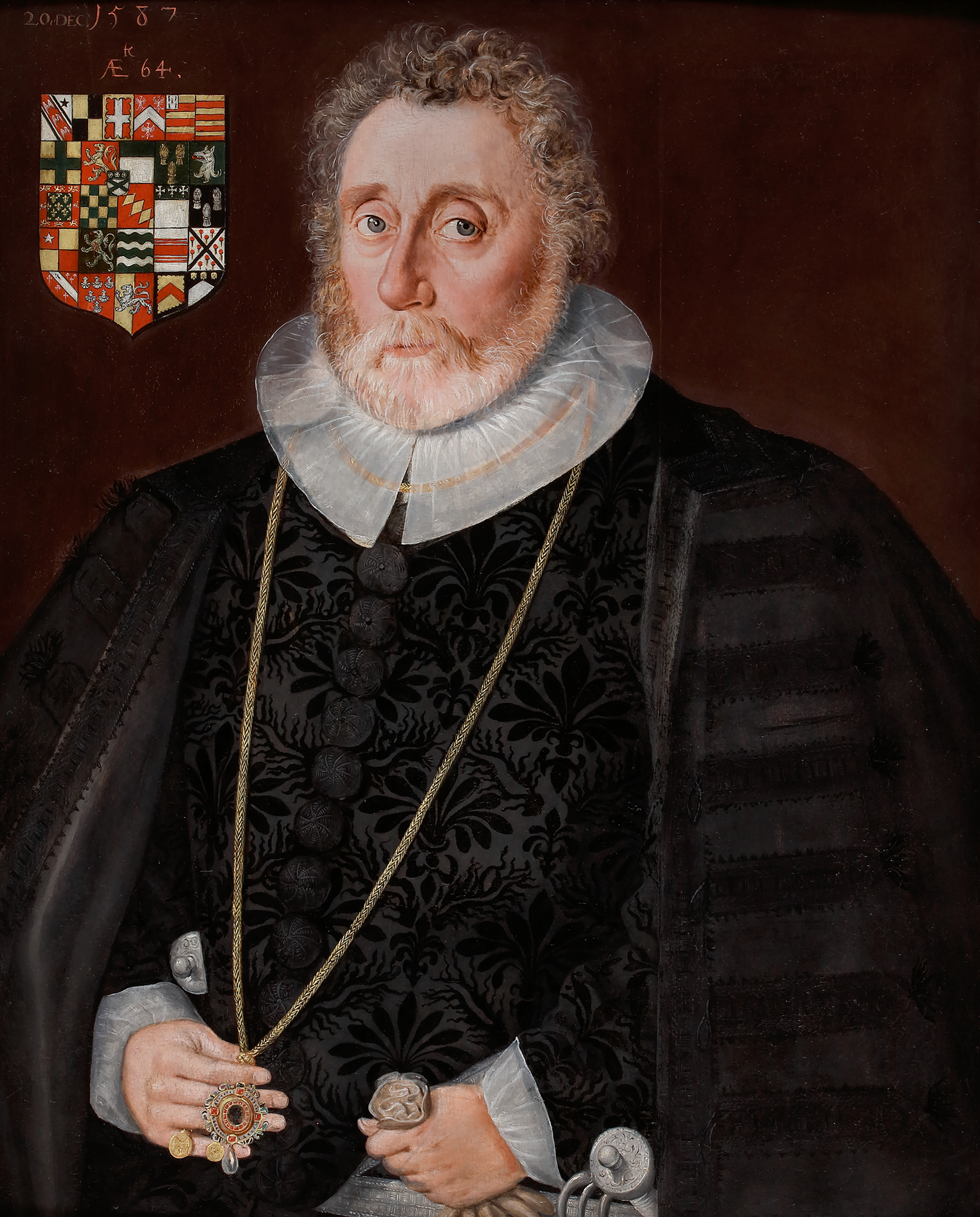

Member of the English Parliament for Orford
- In office 1559

Richard Wingfield (died c. 1591), of Wantisden and Crowfield, Suffolk, was an English politician.

He was a member (MP) of the parliament of England for Orford in 1559. He may also have held this seat in 1586 and 1589. He had lands in Derbyshire, Herefordshire, Staffordshire, Warwickshire and Worcestershire.
