= Benhall =

Civil parish in Suffolk, England

Coordinates: 52.204°N 1.470°E

- Benhall village sign

- Location within Suffolk
- Area: 8.71 km^{2} (3.36 sq mi)
- Population: 569 (2021)
  - Density: 65/km^{2} (170/sq mi)
- OS grid reference: TM3762
- District: East Suffolk
- Shire county: Suffolk
- Region: East
- Country: England
- Sovereign state: United Kingdom
- Post town: Saxmundham
- Postcode district: IP17
- Police: Suffolk
- Fire: Suffolk
- Ambulance: East of England
- UK Parliament: Suffolk Coastal
- Website: Parish Council

Benhall is a civil parish in the East Suffolk district of Suffolk, England. Lying to the south of Saxmundham, its population at the 2021 census was 569. The main settlement is Benhall Green, while the hamlet of Benhall Street lies towards the west of the parish.

== History ==
The manor of Benhall was granted in 1086 to Robert de Malet, and has since had a long and complicated history, having been owned by many of the most powerful people of their time, including the De La Poles, the Howards and King Henry VIII.

=== Benhall Lodge ===
The great house of the area is Benhall Lodge. A manor house had existed on the Benhall estate since at least 1225, when it was fortified by Ralph de Sunderland. Long known as Benhall Lodge, the house has been rebuilt by various Lords of the Manor: including in 1638 by Sir Edward Duke, Bt., in 1790 by William Beaumaris Rush, and in 1810 by Edward Hollond. The mansion house suffered serious fires in 1885 and in 1967, and was restored and slightly remodelled after each. The walled kitchen garden of the country house is now a separate business concern, but the house itself and the surrounding gardens and parkland remain private residential property.

== Governance ==
For the first tier of local government, the adjacent parishes of Benhall and Sternfield elect members of Benhall & Sternfield Parish Council. Most local government functions are carried out by East Suffolk Council and Suffolk County Council. For Westminster elections, the parish is within the Suffolk Coastal constituency.

== Amenities ==
Benhall & Sternfield CofE Primary School has a central position in the village. An ex-servicemen's club provides a social hub.

The Church of England parish church, St Mary's, is in an isolated position on the other side of the A12 from the village. In random flint with stone dressings, the building is largely from the 15th century, and was designated as Grade II* listed for its interior features. Today, the church is part of the Alde River Benefice, a group of seven churches in eight neighbouring villages.

== Notable residents ==
- Edward Glemham, privateer
- Sir Edward Duke, 1st Baronet
- Sir John Duke, 2nd Baronet
- Hyde Parker, admiral
- William Christian Sellé, musician
- Guy Rolfe, actor
