= Edward Glemham =

English voyager and privateer (died in or after 1594)

Edward Glemham Esq.
- Died: c. 1594
- Piratical career
- Type: Privateer
- Allegiance: England
- Years active: c. 1590s
- Rank: Sea captain
- Base of operations: Atlantic; Mediterranean
- Commands: Edward and Constance

Captain Edward Glemham (died in or before 1594) of Benhall, Suffolk, was an English sea voyager and privateer. In his ship, Edward and Constance, he destroyed two Spanish vessels, repulsed four galleys, and captured a rich Venetian merchant ship in his first voyage of 1590. He made a second voyage shortly after the first. His adventures are described in two black letter pamphlets (1591 and 1594; reprinted, 1820 and 1866).

== First voyage ==
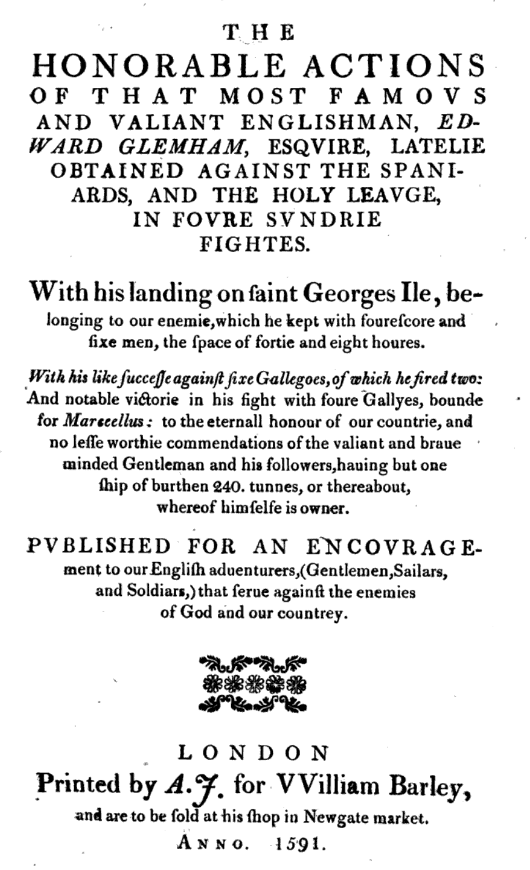
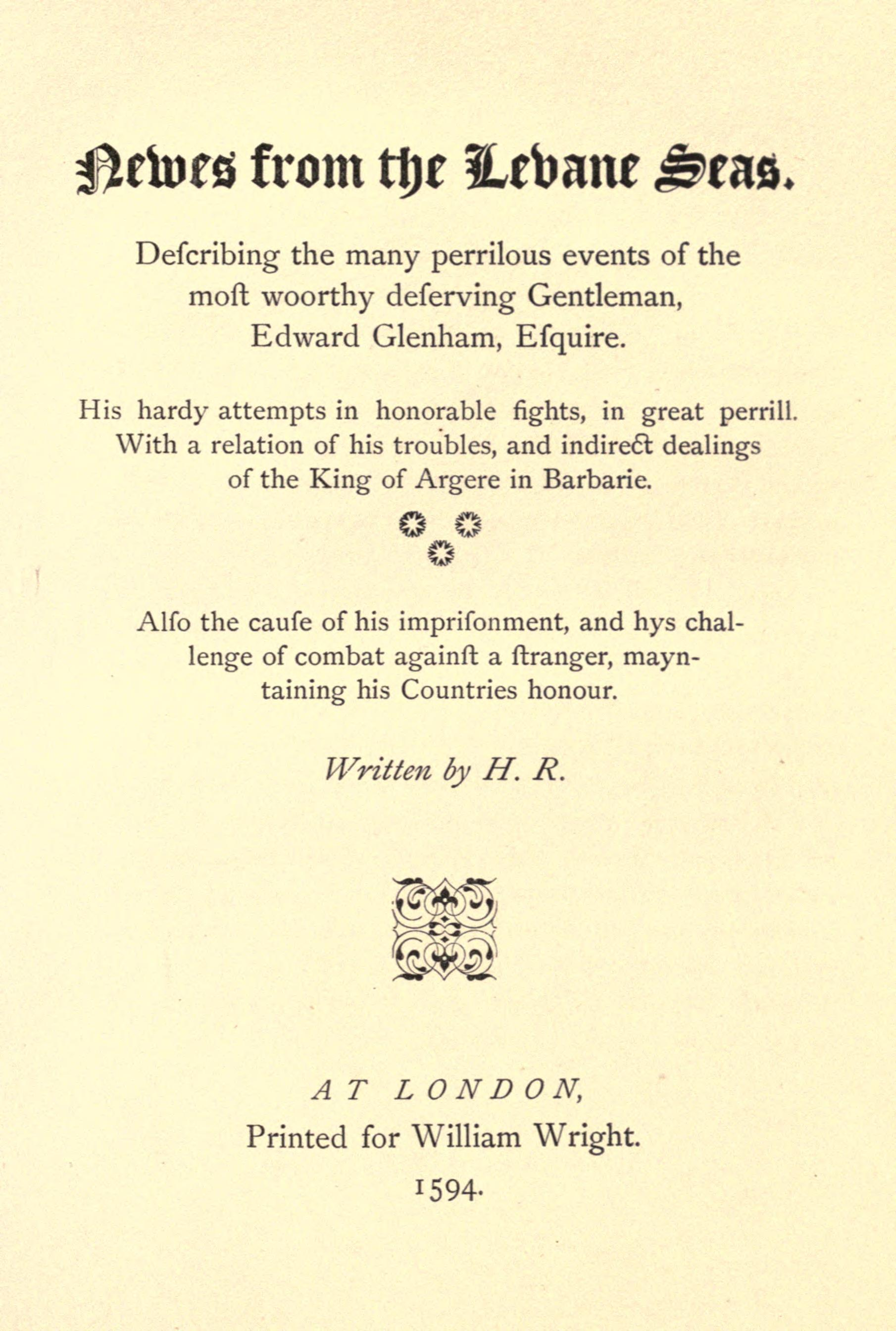
Title pages of the pamphlets describing Glemham's voyages

Edward Glemham, Esquire, of Benhall in Suffolk, in 1590 fitted out, as owner and sole adventurer, the ship Edward and Constance, of 240 tons, in which he sailed from Gravesend in August. He proceeded in the first instance to the Azores, where he landed on St. George's Island with a party of eighty-six men; but finding himself unable to hold the island, as he appears to have intended, he concluded a truce with the governor, and withdrew. He then met with six Spanish ships, two of which he succeeded in destroying; afterwards he had a fierce engagement with four galleys bound for Marseilles, which he beat off; and having refitted at Algiers, entered the Mediterranean, where he captured a large vessel laden with sugar and other valuable merchandise, which was afterwards claimed as Venetian property. The case, as tried in the admiralty court, seemed doubtful, and the judgment was that Glemham was to have the goods 'on a bond in double of their value, to pay their just value within two months after proof has been made, or for so much as is proved to belong to Venetians or others not subjects of the King of Spain'.

An account of the early part of the voyage was published anonymously in 1591 (small 4to, 8 leaves, black letter; reprinted 1820, 8vo), under the title of The Honorable Actions of that most famous and valiant Englishman, Edward Glemham, esquire, latelie obtained against the Spaniards and the Holy League in foure sundrie fightes. Some commendatory verses at the end of the narration express a wish that he may safely return, 'freighted with gold and pearl of India'—a wish which seems to have been fulfilled only in respect of the safety.

== Second voyage ==
A second voyage, undertaken very shortly after the first, was described by the same writer in a small pamphlet published in 1594 (small 4to, 24 pages, black letter; reprinted 1866 in Collier's Illustrations of Old English Literature, Vol. 1), under the title of Newes from the Levane Seas. Describing the many perilous events of the most woorthy deserving Gentleman Edward Glenham, Esquire.

== Legacy ==
Glemham's ventures seem to have been unfortunate, judging from the fact that, starting with good property, 'feasting his friends and relieving the poor plentifully', and having a wife 'sole heir of a right worshipful knight, famous in his life and of great possessions', he sold Benhall away from the family to Edward Duke, who died in 1598. In the Newes from the Levane Seas, the name is frequently spelt Glenham, but this appears to be wrong, as the family was called after Glemham in Suffolk, their ancient seat.

== Sources ==
- Collins, Arthur (1768). The Peerage of England. 4th ed. Vol. 6. London: Printed for H. Woodfall, et al. p. 427.
- Green, Mary Anne Everett, ed. (1867). Calendar of State Papers, Domestic Series, of the Reign of Elizabeth, 1591–1594. London: Longmans, Green, Reader, and Dyer. p. 221.
- Page, Augustine (1844). A Supplement to the Suffolk Traveller. Ipswich: Joshua Page; London: J. B. Nichols and Son. p. 169.
- Raiswell, Richard (2004). "Glemham, Edward (d. in or after 1594), privateer". Oxford Dictionary of National Biography (online ed.). Oxford University Press. doi:10.1093/ref:odnb/10812. (Subscription, Wikipedia Library access or UK public library membership required.)

Attribution:

- This article incorporates text from a publication now in the public domain: Laughton, John Knox (1890). "Glemham, Edward". In Stephen, Leslie (ed.). Dictionary of National Biography. Vol. 21. London: Smith, Elder & Co. pp. 425–426.
