= William Playters =

English politician

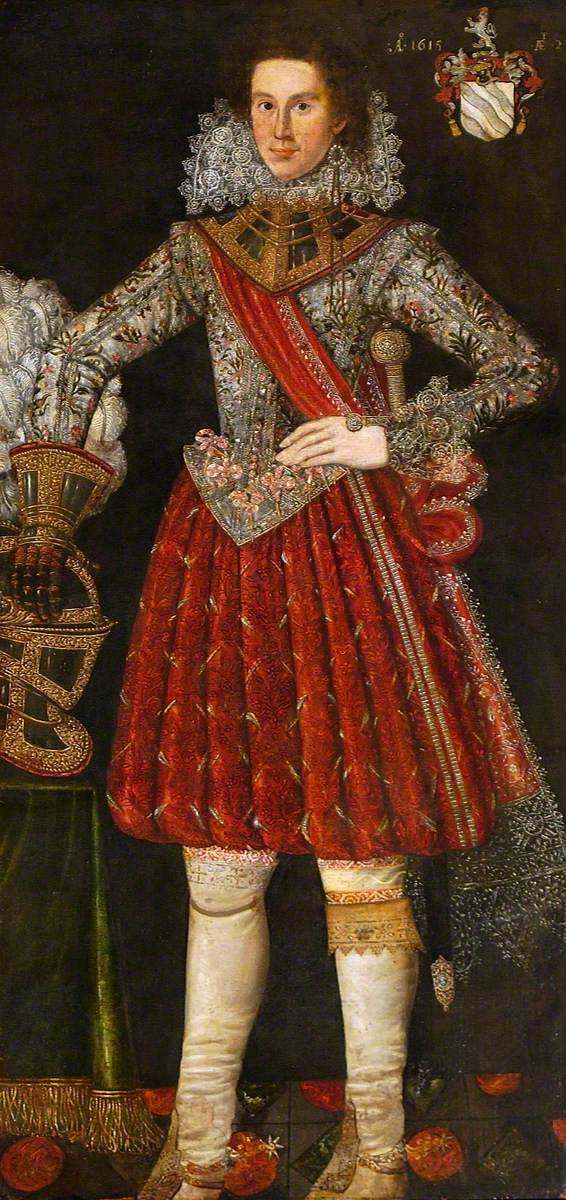
Portrait of Sir William Playters (1590–1668)

Sir William Playters, 2nd Baronet (1590 – 1668) was an English politician who sat in the House of Commons from 1640 to 1648.

Playters was the son of Sir Thomas Playters, 1st Baronet of Sotterley and his wife Anne Swan, daughter of Sir William Swan. He was knighted at Wanstead on 12 September 1623. He inherited the baronetcy on the death of his father in 1638.

In November 1640, Playters was elected Member of Parliament for Orford in the Long Parliament. He was Deputy Lieutenant and Vice-Admiral of Suffolk between 1640 and 1649. He was also a colonel of a regiment until relieved of his posts by parliament.

Playters died at the age of 78 and was commemorated on a monument on the tomb of his wife at Dickleburgh, Norfolk.

Playters married Frances Le Grys, daughter of Christopher Le Grys of Billingford, Norfolk. He had one son, Thomas, who died in 1651. He was succeeded by Sir Lionel Playters.

Parliament of England
Preceded by Sir Charles Legross; Edward Duke	Member of Parliament for Orford; 1640–1648; With: Sir Charles Legross	Succeeded by Not represented in Rump Parliament
Baronetage of England
Preceded by Thomas Playters	Baronet (of Sotterley); 1638–1668	Succeeded by Lyonel Playters
