= Erasmus Paston =

Erasmus Paston (by 1508–40), was an English Member of Parliament (MP).

He was a Member of the Parliament of England for Orford in 1529.

Erasmus married Mary Wyndham of Feldbrigg prior to 1528, whose father was Thomas Wyndham. Among other royal predecessors, her family was a direct descendant of Edward I of England, John of England, Louis VI of France, Henry II of England, Robert II of France, and William the Conqueror.
