= Sir John Duke, 2nd Baronet =

English politician

Sir John Duke, 2nd Baronet (3 January 1632 - July 1705 ) was an English politician who sat in the House of Commons variously between 1679 and 1698.

Duke was the son of Sir Edward Duke, 1st Baronet of Benhall, Suffolk and his wife Ellenor Panton, daughter of John Panton of Westminster and of Brunslip, Denbighshire. His father had been MP for Orford. He was educated at Emmanuel College, Cambridge, and travelled abroad in 1657. He was commissioner for assessment for Suffolk from 1661 to 1680 and became a Deputy Lieutenant and J.P. for Suffolk in 1671. He succeeded to the baronetcy on the death of his father in 1673. He was commissioner for recusants in 1675 and mayor of Orford from 1677 to 1678.

In February 1679, Duke was elected Member of Parliament for Orford. He held the seat until 1685. From 1679 to 1680 he was commissioner for assessment for Orford. In 1685 he was removed from the Suffolk bench and decided not to stand for parliament again. In 1688 from June to October he was an alderman of Dunwich and from 1689 to 1690 was commissioner for assessment for Suffolk and Orford. He also became J.P. again in 1689. He was re-elected MP for Orford in 1689 and held the seat until 1690. He was re-elected MP for Orford in 1697 and held the seat until 1698.

Duke died in 1705 aged 73 and was buried at Benhall on 24 July.

Duke married Elizabeth Duke, daughter of Edward Duke MD FRCP. His son Edward succeeded to the baronetcy and was also MP for Orford.

Baronetage of England
Preceded by Edward Duke	Baronet (of Benhall); 1670–1705	Succeeded by Edward Duke
