= William Acton (MP for Orford) =

English Tory politician

William Acton (c. 1684–1744), of Bramford Hall, Suffolk, was an English Tory politician who sat in the House of Commons between 1722 and 1734.

Acton was born at Bramford, Suffolk, the second son of John Acton of Bramford Hall and either his first wife Isabel Buxton, daughter of J. Buxton, or his second wife Elizabeth Lamb, daughter of J. Lamb. He was admitted at Clare College, Cambridge on 30 January 1701. In 1704, he succeeded his elder brother John to the family estate.

Acton was returned as Tory Member of Parliament for Orford at the 1722 British general election. He voted consistently against the Government. He did not stand at the 1727 British general election but was returned unopposed for Orford at a by-election on 31 January 1729. He did not stand at the 1734 British general election. He was High Sheriff of Suffolk for the year 1739 to 1740.

Acton died without heirs on 23 January 1744 and was buried in St Peters church, Baylham, Suffolk. He left £100 towards building the chapel of Clare College. Bramford Hall, which was built by John Acton in the late 17th century, had 15 to 19 hearths in 1674. The park was over half a mile across in 1783 when Nathanial Acton was the owner. Most of the house was demolished early in 1956.

Parliament of Great Britain
Preceded by Sir Edward Duke; Dudley North	Member of Parliament for Orford; 1722 – 1727; With: Dudley North	Succeeded by Dudley North; Price Devereux
Preceded by Price Devereux; Dudley North	Member of Parliament for Orford; 1729 – 1734; With: Dudley North to 1730; Sir Robert Kemp from 1730	Succeeded by Richard Powys; Lewis Barlow
