= George Jerningham (died 1559) =

George Jerningham (1515–1559), of Somerleyton, Suffolk, was an English Member of Parliament (MP).

He was a Member of the Parliament of England for Orford in October 1553 and Dunwich in April 1554.
