= Ralph Knevet =

English clergyman and poet

Ralph Knevet (1600–1671) was an English clergyman and poet.

Knevet was a member of the Knevet family of Norfolk. He was admitted at Peterhouse, Cambridge, on 13 September 1617, aged 16, and was awarded LLB in 1624. He joined the family of Sir William Paston, probably as a chaplain or tutor.

Knevet was an avowed disciple of George Herbert, and has been described as a "learned and spasmodically talented poet". He wrote the play Rhodon and Iris dedicated to Nicholas Bacon and presented it at the Florist's Feast in Norwich on 3 May 1631. In 1633 he authored the MS. Supplement of the Faery Queene in Three Books. In 1637 he composed Funeral Elegies to Lady Paston and in 1638 travelled with the Paston family to Rome. His Gallery to the Temple was composed in the 1640s. Among his shorter works was a poem dedicated to Sir Charles le Gross, who married Muriel Knyvet, daughter of Sir Thomas Knyvet.

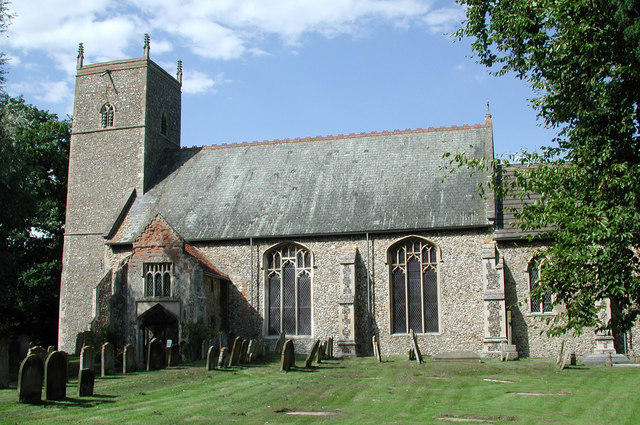
St Margaret church, Lyng

Knevet took Holy Orders and became Rector of Lyng, Norfolk in 1652 and remained there for the rest of his life. He died in 1671 aged 71 and was buried in the chancel of Lyng church.

== Works ==
- A discourse of militarie discipline, 1628.
- Rhodon and Isis: a pastorall, 1631.
- Funerall elegies; consecrated to the memory of the Lady K. Paston, 1637.
- A gallery to the temple: lyrical poems upon sacred occasions (Pisa: Libreria Goliardica Editrice, 1954)
- The shorter poems of Ralph Knevet: a critical edition (edited by Amy M. Charles, 1966)
- A supplement of the Faery Queene; Ralph Knevet (edited by Christopher Burlinson and Andrew Zurcher, 2021)
