= Walter Devereux (died 1683) =

English politician

Walter Devereux (c. 1621 – December 1683) was an English politician who sat in the House of Commons from 1660 to 1679.

Devereux was the son of Walter Devereux, 5th Viscount Hereford and his second wife Elizabeth Knightley, the daughter of Thomas Knightley of Burgh Hall, Staffordshire. He married Anne, the daughter of William Forthe of Butley Priory, near Orford, Suffolk, at which the couple subsequently lived.

He was commissioner for sewers for Norfolk and Suffolk in 1658 and 1659 and became a freeman of Orford in 1660.

In 1660, Devereux was elected member of parliament for Orford in the Convention Parliament. He became a justice of the peace for Suffolk in July 1660. He was re-elected MP for Orford in 1661 for the Cavalier Parliament and sat until 1679. He was relatively inactive during his time in parliament.

After his wife died in 1668 he went to live with Thomas Glemham. He died at Little Glemham in December 1683. Butley was inherited by his eldest daughter, his only son having died before him.
