= Price Devereux, 10th Viscount Hereford =

British Tory politician

Price Devereux, 10th Viscount Hereford (9 June 1694 – 29 July 1748) was a British Tory politician who sat in the House of Commons from 1719 to 1740 when he succeeded to a peerage as Viscount Hereford.

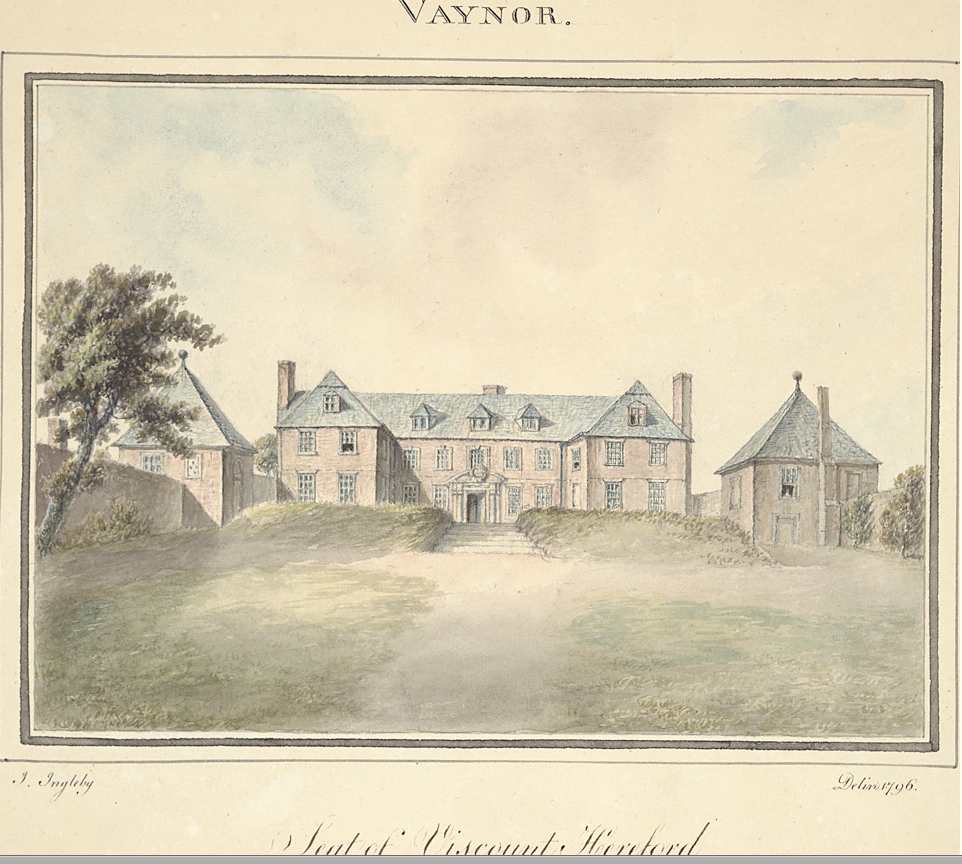
Vaynor Park, Montgomeryshire, 1796

Devereux was the son of Price Devereux, 9th Viscount Hereford and his wife Mary Sandys, daughter of Samuel Sandys of Ombersley Court, Worcestershire. He entered Balliol College, Oxford in 1711.

In 1719 Devereux was High Sheriff of Brecknockshire, having inherited the estate of the Morgans of Pencoyd near Hay-on-Wye. The same year he was returned unopposed at a by-election as Member of Parliament for Montgomeryshire. He was returned again for Montgomeryshire at the general elections of 1722 and 1727. In 1727 he was also returned as MP for Orford but preferred to represent Montgomeryshire where he was returned again at the 1734 general election.

In 1740 he surrendered his seat when, on the death of his father, he succeeded to the peerage as Viscount Hereford, premier viscount of England, inheriting Vaynor Park in Montgomery. He married as his first wife the daughter and heiress of Leicester Martin and as his second wife (1740) a daughter of William Price of Rhiwlas, Merioneth.

On Devereux' death on 29 July 1748, the title passed to Edward Devereux, a distant cousin in Nantcribba, Montgomeryshire and the estate at Vaynor Park was sold.

Parliament of the United Kingdom
Preceded by Edward Vaughan	Member of Parliament for Montgomeryshire; 1719–1740	Succeeded by Robert Williams
Preceded by Dudley North; William Acton	Member of Parliament for Orford; 1727–1729; With: Dudley North	Succeeded by Dudley North; William Acton
Peerage of England
Preceded by Price Devereux	Viscount Hereford; 1740–1748	Succeeded by Edward Devereux
Baronetage of England
Preceded by Price Devereux	Baronet (of Castle Bromwich); 1740–1748	Succeeded by Edward Devereux
