= Francis Sone =

English politician

Francis Sone or Soone (by 1523–1561), of Wantisden, Suffolk, was an English Member of Parliament (MP).

He was a Member of the Parliament of England for Orford in 1545, 1558 and 1559.
