= Benhall Green =

Village in Suffolk, England

Coordinates: 52.199°N 1.486°E

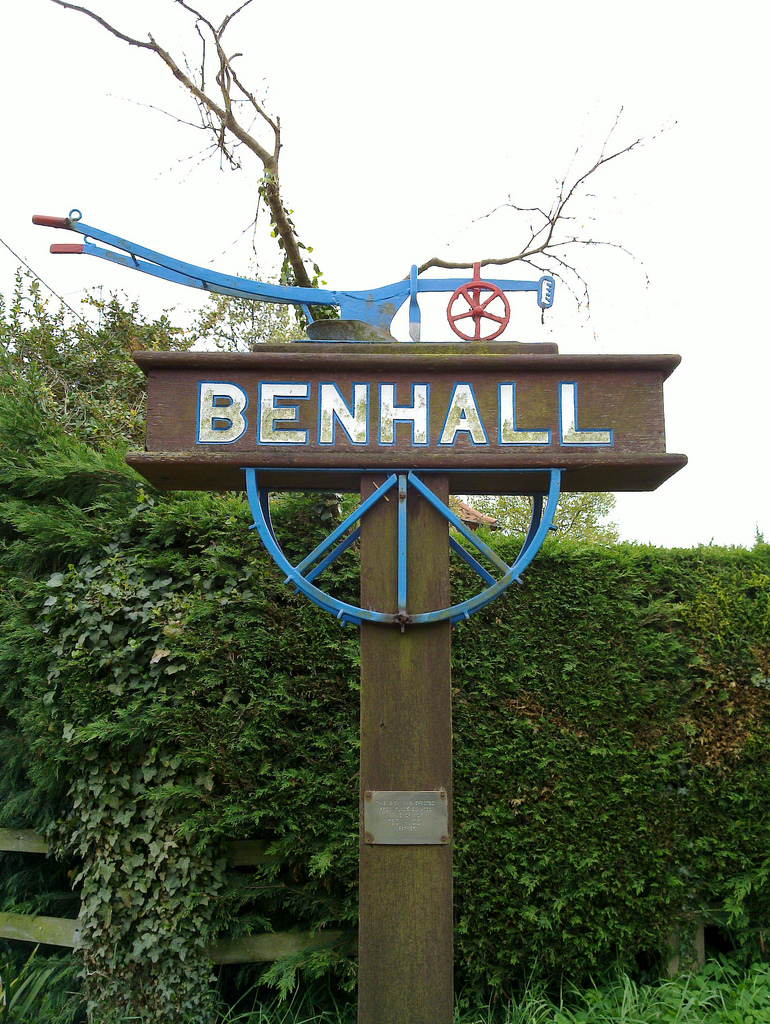
- Sign on the village green

- Location within Suffolk
- Population: 569 (2021)
- OS grid reference: TM383613
- District: East Suffolk
- Shire county: Suffolk
- Region: East
- Country: England
- Sovereign state: United Kingdom
- Post town: Saxmundham
- Postcode district: IP17
- Dialling code: 01728
- Police: Suffolk
- Fire: Suffolk
- Ambulance: East of England
- UK Parliament: Suffolk Coastal

Benhall Green is a village in Suffolk, England, about 1 mile (1.6 km) south of the town of Saxmundham. The village is the main settlement of Benhall parish, which had a population of 569 at the 2021 census.

The main road south from Saxmundham skirted the village to the west and became the A12 trunk road. The Saxmundham bypass, built in the 1980s, now carries the trunk road a little further from the village.

On the south-east edge of the village, a lane crosses the small River Fromus at a ford, then immediately enters Sternfield village. For the first tier of local government, Benhall and Sternfield parishes elect members of Benhall & Sternfield Parish Council. Most local government functions are carried out by East Suffolk Council and Suffolk County Council. For Westminster elections, the parish is within the Suffolk Coastal constituency.

Benhall & Sternfield CofE Primary School has a central position in the village. An ex-servicemen's club provides a social hub.

The Church of England parish church, St Mary's, is in an isolated position on the other side of the A12 from the village. In random flint with stone dressings, the building is largely from the 15th century, and was designated as Grade II* listed for its interior features. Today, the church is part of the Alde River Benefice, a group of seven churches in eight neighbouring villages.

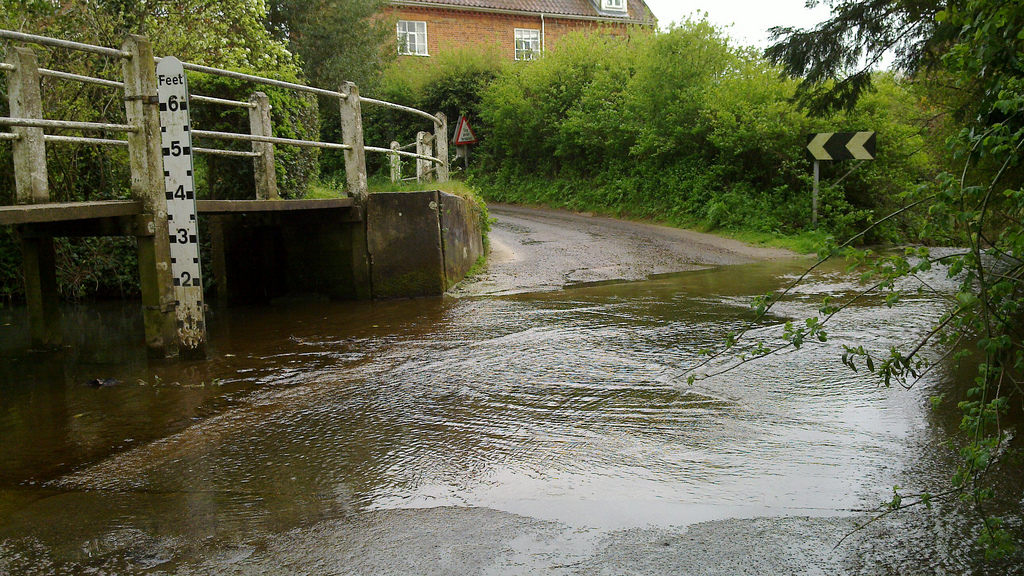
The ford over the River Fromus, south-east of Benhall Green
