= John Cook (fl. 1542) =

John Cook (fl. 1542), was an English Member of Parliament (MP).

He was a Member of the Parliament of England for Orford in 1542.
