= Playters baronets =

Extinct baronetcy in the Baronetage of England

The Playters Baronetcy, of Sotterley in the County of Suffolk, was a title in the Baronetage of England. It was created on 13 August 1623 for Thomas Playters and was one of the last baronetcies created by King James I. The second Baronet was Vice-Admiral of Suffolk between 1640 and 1649. The fifth Baronet served as High Sheriff of Suffolk in 1728. The title became extinct on the death of the eighth Baronet in 1832.

The family seat was Sotterley Hall until its sale in 1744. at which point an estate was purchased at Yelverton in Norfolk.

== Playters baronets, of Sotterley (1623) ==
Escutcheon of the Playters baronets of Sotterley

- Sir Thomas Playters, 1st Baronet (died 1638)
- Sir William Playters, 2nd Baronet (1590–1668)
- Sir Lyonel Playters, 3rd Baronet (1605–1679)
- Sir John Playters, 4th Baronet (1636–1721)
- Sir John Playters, 5th Baronet (1680–1768)
- Sir John Playters, 6th Baronet (1742–1791)
- Sir Charles Playters, 7th Baronet (died 1806)
- Sir William John Playters, 8th Baronet (died 1832)
