= Sir Edward Duke, 3rd Baronet =

British politician

Sir Edward Duke, 3rd Baronet (c. 1694–1732), of Benhall, Suffolk, was a British politician who sat in the House of Commons from 1721 to 1722

Duke was the only son of Sir John Duke, 2nd Baronet MP and his wife Elizabeth Duke, daughter of Edward Duke, MD. His father died in 1705 and he succeeded to Benhall and the baronetcy. He married Mary Rudge, daughter of Thomas Rudge of Staffordshire on 1 December 1715.

Duke was elected as Tory Member of Parliament for Orford at a contested by-election on 29 December 1721 and sat for the last months of the Parliament. He did not stand at the 1722 general election.

Duke died on 25 August 1732. He had a son and daughter who did not survive and the baronetcy became extinct on his death.

Parliament of Great Britain
| Preceded by Sir Edward Turnor; Clement Corrance | Member of Parliament for Orford; 1721–1722; With: Clement Corrance | Succeeded by Dudley North; William Acton |
Baronetage of England
| Preceded by John Duke | Baronet (of Benhall); 1705-1732 | Extinct |
