= George Heneage (16th century MP) =

George Heneage (by 1522–95), of Hainton, Lincolnshire, was an English Member of Parliament (MP).

He was a Member of the Parliament of England for Orford in 1547 and for Great Grimsby in October 1553.
