= Leonard Sandell =

Leonard Sandell (by 1533–1570), of Hatfield Peverel, Essex, was an English Member of Parliament (MP).

He was a Member of the Parliament of England for Orford in November 1554.
