= Mount Sandel =

Mount Sandel may refer to:

- Mount Sandel Fort, a fort in Coleraine, County Londonderry, Northern Ireland
- Mount Sandel Mesolithic site, excavated mesolithic huts in Coleraine, County Londonderry, Northern Ireland
- Mount Sandel, County Londonderry, a townland in County Londonderry, Northern Ireland
