= John Valentine (MP) =

John Valentine (by 1502-58/59), of Ipswich, Suffolk, was an English Member of Parliament (MP).

He was a Member of the Parliament of England for Orford in 1523.
