= John Andrew (Ipswich MP) =

John Andrew was an MP for Ipswich (1442, 1449) and Bletchingley (Nov 1449).

== Biography ==
The son of James Andrew (MP), an influential lawyer strongly connected to the Earl of Suffolk, John's early life was upturned by an incident in 1434 in which a land dispute between his father and Richard Sterysacre, a retainer of the Duke of Norfolk turned violent. James Andrew was killed, forcing his mother Alice to seek the direct protection of Earl Suffolk. With the Earl on one side and Duke on the other, the confrontation threatened to spill over into large scale violence and forced the King's Council to intervene directly in 1435. Both parties were made to agree that they would not interfere in a formal inquiry, which ended with a series of royal pardons.

John himself followed in his father's footsteps and became a Lincoln's Inn lawyer, later sitting in Parliament for Ipswich and, later, the pocket borough of Bletchingley.

During this period, in the reign of Henry VI, a Commons seat was usually acquired by agreement between the local gentry, with the consent or active intervention of the local lord, while pocket borough seats were controlled directly by the landholder, making it effectively an appointed position.
