= Thomas Spicer (16th century MP) =

Thomas Spicer (1502/3-59 or later), of Orford, Suffolk, was an English Member of Parliament (MP).

He was a Member of the Parliament of England for Orford in 1555.
