= Allen Brodrick =

English politician

Sir Allen Brodrick (28 July 1623 – 25 November 1680) was an English politician who sat in the House of Commons between 1660 and 1679.

Brodrick was the son of Thomas Brodrick, of Wandsworth, then in Surrey. He matriculated at Magdalen Hall, Oxford on 29 November 1639, aged 16 and was called to the bar at Gray's Inn in 1648.

In 1660, Brodrick was elected Member of Parliament for Orford in the Convention Parliament. for his services to the Restoration of the Monarchy he was knighted on 1 August 1660 and made Surveyor General of Ireland from 1660 to 1667. He became an M.P. for Dungarvan (Ireland) in 1661. Also in 1661 he was elected MP for Callington and for Orford in the Cavalier Parliament and chose to sit for Orford which he represented until 1679. He was created M.A.at Oxford on 9 September 1661.

Brodrick died unmarried at Wandsworth in 1680 at the age of 57.
