= John Harman (MP) =

John Harman (by 1509-58 or later), of Rendlesham, Suffolk, was an English Member of Parliament (MP).

He was a Member of the Parliament of England for Orford in 1536, 1539, 1545, 1547 and November 1554 and for Bletchingley in April 1554.
