= Richard Poty =

Richard Poty (by 1517-1545/1546), of Orford and Woodbridge, Suffolk, was an English Member of Parliament (MP).

He was a Member of the Parliament of England for Orford in 1536, 1539 and 1542.
