= Orford (constituency) =

UK Parliamentary constituency, 1801–1832

- Former borough constituency for the House of Commons

1529–1832
- Seats: Two
- Replaced by: East Suffolk

Orford was a constituency of the House of Commons. Consisting of the town of Orford in Suffolk, it elected two Members of Parliament (MP) by the block vote version of the first past the post system of election until it was disenfranchised in 1832.

== History ==
Orford was first represented in the Parliament of England in 1298, but did not regularly send members until 1529. The right of election was vested in the Mayor, eight portmen, twelve "capital burgesses" and the freemen of the borough. In the early days of its representation, Orford had been a prosperous port and its freemen were numerous, but by the 18th century the number of freemen was deliberately kept low to facilitate controlling the elections, and the town had become a pocket borough where most of the qualified voters consisted of the owner's family and retainers.

At one time Orford was owned by Viscount Hereford, but after his death in 1748 it was bought by the government, and by 1760, Orford was perhaps the most secure of all the "Treasury boroughs" – in other words boroughs where the influence of the Crown was so strong that the government could be sure of securing the election of whichever candidates they chose. As such, it was studied in detail by the historian Lewis Namier in his book Structure and Politics.

To secure government control, the treasury started packing the corporation with outsiders: Namier quotes a letter from John Roberts (who was managing the borough for the government) to Prime Minister Newcastle, urging an immediate decision on who should be nominated to a vacancy as capital burgess because otherwise "we shall be reduced to the necessity of chusing a townsman, the number of which it would be better not to encrease". Maintaining government control of the borough also involved considerable expenditure – £200 a year for rent of houses, and a further £100 for other expenses such as repairs and taxes, all met out of the secret service fund.

However, much of Viscount Hereford's estate had been bought by the Earl of Hertford, and he together with his brother Henry Seymour Conway, an influential minister, put pressure on successive Prime Ministers for the control of the borough to be given to him. Eventually in 1766, with the formation of Chatham's ministry, this pressure bore fruit, and Orford was transferred to the Earl of Hertford as partial compensation for his having been supplanted as Lord-Lieutenant of Ireland. From this point it remained under the control of Hertford and his heirs until it lost its representation 66 years later, and all its MPs were either members of the Seymour-Conway family or their friends.

By the time of the Great Reform Act in 1832, the population of the borough was only 1,302, in 246 houses, with about 22 men entitled to vote, and this was too small to justify its existence being retained.

== Members of Parliament ==
=== MPs 1529–1660 ===
Parliament	First member	Second member
1510–1515	No names known	
1523	John Valentine	?
1529	Erasmus Paston	Richard Hunt
1536	?Richard Poty	?John Harman
1539	?Richard Poty	?John Harman
1542	John Cook	?Richard Poty
1545	John Harman	Francis Sone
1547	George Heneage	John Harman
1553 (Mar)	William Honing	Henry Cornwallis
1553 (Oct)	George Jerningham	Thomas Harvey
1554 (Apr)	?	
1554 (Nov)	John Harman	Leonard Sandell
1555	Thomas Seckford	Thomas Spicer
1558	Francis Sone	Thomas Seckford
1558–9	Richard Wingfield	Francis Sone
1562–3	Lawrence Meres	William Yaxley
1571 (Mar)	Anthony Wingfield	Anthony Rush
1572	Anthony Wingfield	Anthony Rush
1584 (Nov)	Henry Wingfield	John Cutting
1586 (Oct)	Richard Wingfield	William Downing
1588 (Oct)	Richard Wingfield	George Chittinge
1593	Edward Grimston	John North
1597 (Sep)	Thomas Rivett	William Forthe
1601 (Oct)	Sir John Townshend	Sir Richard Knightley
1604	Michael Stanhope	William Cornwallis
1614	William Cornwallis	Sir Francis Baildon
1621–1622	Sir Lionel Tollemache	Sir Roger Townshend
1624	Sir Robert Hitcham	William Glover
1625	Sir Robert Hitcham	Sir William Whitepole
1626	Sir Robert Hitcham	Charles Croft
1628	Sir Charles Legross	Sir Lionel Tollemache
1629–1640	No Parliaments summoned	
1640 Apr	Sir Charles le Grosse	Sir Edward Duke
1640 Nov	Sir William Playters, 2nd Baronet	Sir Charles Legross
1645	Sir William Playters, 2nd Baronet	Sir Charles Legross
1648–1659	Not represented in Rump, Barebones and First and Second Protectorate Parliaments	
1659	Thomas Edger	Jeremy Copping

=== MPs 1660–1832 ===
Year	First member	First party	Second member	Second party
1660	Walter Devereux		Sir Allen Brodrick	
1661	Walter Devereux		Sir Allen Brodrick	
Feb. 1679	Lord Huntingtower		Sir John Duke	
Sept. 1679	Henry Parker		Sir John Duke	
1681	Thomas Glemham		Sir John Duke	
1685	Thomas Glemham		Lord Huntingtower	
1689	Thomas Glemham		Sir John Duke	
1690	Thomas Glemham		Sir Thomas Felton	
1695	Sir Adam Felton		Sir Thomas Felton	
1697	Sir John Duke		Sir Thomas Felton	
1698	Sir Charles Hedges		Sir Thomas Felton	
1700	Sir Edmund Bacon		William Johnson	
1701	Sir Edmund Bacon		Sir Edward Turnor	
1708	Clement Corrance		Sir Edward Turnor	
1709	Clement Corrance		William Thompson	
1710	Clement Corrance		Sir Edward Turnor	
1721	Clement Corrance		Sir Edward Duke	Tory
1722	Dudley North	Tory	William Acton	Tory
1727	Dudley North	Tory	Hon. Price Devereux	Tory
1729	Dudley North	Tory	William Acton	Tory
1730	Robert Kemp	Tory	William Acton	Tory
1734	Richard Powys		Lewis Barlow	
1738	Richard Powys		John Cope	
1741	Viscount Glenorchy		Henry Bilson-Legge	
1746	Hon. John Bateman		Henry Bilson-Legge	
1747	Hon. John Waldegrave		Henry Bilson-Legge	
1754	John Offley	Whig	Henry Bilson-Legge	
1759	John Offley	Whig	Hon. Charles FitzRoy	Whig
1761	John Offley	Whig	Thomas Worsley	Whig
1768	Viscount Beauchamp		Edward Colman	
1771	Viscount Beauchamp		Hon. Robert Seymour-Conway	
1784	Viscount Beauchamp		Hon. George Seymour-Conway	
1790	Viscount Beauchamp		Hon. William Seymour	
1794	Lord Robert Seymour	Tory	Hon. William Seymour	
1796	Lord Robert Seymour	Tory	Viscount Castlereagh	Tory
1797	Lord Robert Seymour	Tory	Earl of Yarmouth	Tory
1802	Lord Robert Seymour	Tory	James Trail	Tory
1806	Lord Robert Seymour	Tory	Lord Henry Moore	Tory
1807	William Sloane	Tory	Lord Henry Moore	Tory
1812	Charles Arbuthnot	Tory	Edmund Alexander Macnaghten	Tory
1818	John Douglas	Tory	Edmund Alexander Macnaghten	Tory
March 1820	John Douglas	Tory	Horace Seymour	Tory
May 1820	John Douglas	Tory	Edmund Alexander Macnaghten	Tory
1821	The Marquess of Londonderry	Tory	Edmund Alexander Macnaghten	Tory
1822	Charles Ross	Tory	Edmund Alexander Macnaghten	Tory
June 1826	Sir Henry Cooke	Tory	Horace Seymour	Tory
December 1826	Sir Henry Cooke	Tory	Quintin Dick	Tory
1830	Sir Henry Cooke	Tory	Spencer Kilderbee	Tory
1832		Constituency abolished		
