= Sternfield =

Village in Suffolk, England

Coordinates: 52.201°N 1.497°E

- St Mary Magdalene church

- Location within Suffolk
- Population: 132 (2011)
- Shire county: Suffolk
- Region: East
- Country: England
- Sovereign state: United Kingdom
- Post town: SAXMUNDHAM
- Postcode district: IP17

Sternfield is a village in Suffolk, England. It is located 1 mile (2 km) south of Saxmundham, its post town. The village is very small and irregularly built, and is wholly agricultural.

The village contains a church dedicated to Mary Magdalene. It is Grade II* listed for its surviving medieval work, notably the south porch and tower.

During the 1960s and 1970s Lt. Col. Sir Eric and Lady Penn lived at Sternfield House, a large house next to the church with extensive gardens and as Sir Eric was the comptroller of the Lord Chamberlain's Office and a trusted presence in Buckingham Palace, senior members of the royal family came and stayed at Sternfield House on a number of occasions. Princess Margaret came most often, but the Queen also came at least once and attended St Mary Magdalene's, as did the Queen Mother.

Another notable property is Sternfield Hall, with its classic Georgian soft red brick facade and late 16th-century wing which is probably the site of a medieval manor house where on 27 April 1385, a licence to crenellate at Sternefeld (Sternfield) was granted to Sir Michael de la Pole by Richard II in year eight of his reign.
