= Sir Edward Duke, 1st Baronet =

English politician

Sir Edward Duke, 1st Baronet (c. 1604 – 1671) was an English politician who sat in the House of Commons of England in 1640.

Duke was the son of Ambrose Duke of Benhall and his wife Elizabeth Calthrop, daughter of Bartholemew Calthrop of Suffolk. His father died in 1610 and he inherited the estates of Benhall, Suffolk. He was High Sheriff of Suffolk in 1638 when he also built a new mansion at Benhall.

In April 1640, Duke was elected Member of Parliament for Orford. He was knighted and made a commissioner of array. In 1661, Duke was created a baronet of Benhall and Brampton, Cambridgeshire by King Charles II of England.

Duke married Ellenor Panton, daughter of John Panton of Westminster and of Brunslip, Denbighshire, and had 29 children by her. His son John succeeded to the baronetcy and was also MP for Orford. His daughter Elizabeth married Nathaniel Bacon and as he had forbidden the match, she was cut off without a penny. However, both Thomas Bacon, Nathaniel's wealthy merchant father, and Elizabeth's brother John made ample provision for the young couple.

Parliament of England
Vacant Parliament suspended since 1629	Member of Parliament for Orford; 1640; With: Sir Charles Legross	Succeeded by Sir William Playters Bt; Sir Charles Legross
Baronetage of England
New creation	Baronet (of Benhall); 1661–1670	Succeeded by John Duke
