= John Ward (1670–1749) =

English politician (1670–1749)

John Ward (13 June 1670 – 17 March 1749) was an English Tory politician and lawyer. He sat as MP for Newton from 7 December 1703 till 1715 and Thetford from 1715 till 1722.

He was the first son of Philip Ward (died 1687) and Penelope, daughter of Charles Edmunds. He was educated at Christ Church, Oxford in 1684. He was educated at Gray's Inn in 1689 and called to the bar in 1693. He entered the Inner Temple in 1698 and sat as a bencher in 1711. He married Thomazia, the daughter of Thomas Terrick and had 1 son who predeceased him and three daughters.
